= Gray (surname) =

Gray is a surname of English and Scottish origins. In most Scottish instances, the name "Gray" is from the Germanic Scots language, and is cognate with Old English, "græg", meaning "grey", probably as a hair colour.

== A ==
- Aaron Gray, basketball player for the Detroit Pistons
- Adam Gray, American politician
- Adeline Gray (parachutist) (1915/16–1975), American parachutist
- Adrian Gray, English darts player
- Adrienne Gray, American make-up artist and political commentator
- Ahuvah Gray
- Alan Gray (1855–1935), British organist and composer
- Alasdair Gray (1934–2019), Scottish writer and artist
- Alexander Gray (disambiguation), multiple people
- Alfred Gray (disambiguation), multiple people
- Alice Gray, American entomologist
- Allan Gray (disambiguation), multiple people
- Andre Gray, English professional footballer
- Andrew Gray (disambiguation), multiple people
- Andy Gray (disambiguation), multiple people
- Archibald Gray (dermatologist) (1880–1967), British physician
- Archibald Gray (minister) (before 1770–1831), Canadian Presbyterian minister
- Archie Gray (1877–1943), Scottish footballer
- Asa Gray (1810–1888), American botanist
- Avis Gray (born 1954), Canadian politician

== B ==
- Barry Gray (1908–1984), British musician and composer
- Barry Gray (radio personality) (1916–1996), American radio personality
- Benjamin Kirkman Gray (1862–1907), English economist and author
- Bernard Gray (Sunday Pictorial journalist) (died 1942), British Second World War journalist
- Bryson Gray (born 1991), American rapper

== C ==
- Carl Raymond Gray, American railroad president
- Carolyn Gray, Canadian playwright
- Catriona Gray, Filipino-Australian model
- CJ Gray (born 2007), American professional baseball player
- Cecil Gray (disambiguation), multiple people
- Cedric Gray (born 2002), American football player
- Chad Gray, HELLYEAH and former Mudvayne vocalist
- Charles Gray (disambiguation), multiple people
- Charles McNeill Gray, American politician
- Charlotte Gray (disambiguation), multiple people
- Chelsea Gray (born 1992), American basketbal player
- Cheryl A. Gray Evans, Louisiana politician
- Chris Gray (disambiguation), multiple people
- Christian Gray (American football) (born 2005), American football player
- Christopher Gray (architectural historian) (1950–2017), American journalist and architectural historian
- Christopher Gray (organist), British organist
- Clifton Daggett Gray, American Baptist, President of Bates College
- Coleen Gray (1922–2015), American actress
- Conan Gray (1998), American musician, songwriter and internet personality

== D ==
- Dana Sue Gray, American serial killer
- Dan Gray (disambiguation), multiple people
- Dave Gray, major league pitcher
- David Gray (disambiguation), multiple people
- Dean Gray, pseudonym
- Dennis Gray (born 1935), English mountain climber
- Derwin Gray (offensive lineman) (born 1995), American football player
- Devin Gray (basketball) (1972–2013), American basketball player
- Dick Gray (1931–2013), Irish-American baseball player
- Dobie Gray, American musician
- Dolores Gray, American musical theatre actress
- Dorian Gray (actress) (1928–2011), Italian actress
- Dougie Gray (1905–1972), Scottish footballer
- Dulcie Gray, British actress
- Dunc Gray, Australian cyclist

== E ==
- Eddie Gray (disambiguation), multiple people
- Edmund Gray, American politician
- Edmund Dwyer-Gray, Irish-Australian politician
- Edward Leslie Gray, Canadian politician and member of the Legislative Assembly of Alberta
- Edward Whitaker Gray, English physician & botanist
- Effie Gray, wife of John Ruskin and John Everett Millais
- Eileen Gray, Irish furniture designer and architect
- Elisha Gray, American electrical engineer
- Elizabeth Gray (disambiguation), multiple people
- Elspet Gray (1929–2013), Scottish actress
- Eric Gray (disambiguation), multiple people
- Erin Gray, American actress
- Ernest Gray (1856–1932), British politician
- Ernest Gray (New Zealand politician) (1833–1895), New Zealand politician
- Ernest Alfonso Gray (1878–?), American politician and lawyer from Virginia
- Eva Gray (actress)
- Eva Gray (cricketer)
- Evan Gray, New Zealand cricketer

== F ==
- Farrah Gray, American businessman, investor, author, columnist, and motivational speaker
- Frank Gray, Scottish football manager and former player
- Frank Gray (politician)
- Frank Gray (researcher)
- Fred Gray (disambiguation), multiple people

== G ==
- Gabriel "Sylar" Gray, character on the television show Heroes
- Gary Gray (disambiguation), multiple people
- F. Gary Gray, American film director
- Gary LeRoi Gray, American actor
- Geoffrey Gray (born 1997), American-Israeli professional basketball player in the Israeli Basketball Premier League
- George Gray (disambiguation), multiple people
- Gilda Gray, Polish-American dancer and actress
- Glen Gray, American jazz saxophonist and leader of the Casa Loma Orchestra
- Gregory Gray, British singer and songwriter
- Gustave Le Gray, French painter, draughtsman, sculptor, print-maker, and photographer

== H ==
- Hamish Gray, Baron Gray of Contin (1927–2006), Scottish politician
- Hanna Holborn Gray (born 1930), American historian
- Harold Gray (1894–1968), American cartoonist
- Harold St George Gray, British archeologist
- Harry Gray (business executive) (1919–2009), American business executive
- Harry B. Gray (born 1935), American chemist
- Hawthorne C. Gray (1889–1927), American balloonist
- Henry Gray (disambiguation), multiple people
- Herb Gray (1931–2014), Canadian politician
- Herb Gray (Canadian football) (1934–2011), American-born Canadian football player
- Herbert Branston Gray (1851–1929), English clergyman and schoolmaster
- Horace Gray (1828–1902), American jurist

== I ==
- Iain Gray, Scottish politician
- Isaac P. Gray, American politician

== J ==
- James Gray (disambiguation), multiple people
- Jamie Gray (disambiguation), multiple people
  - Jamie Gray, a British murderer
  - Jamie Gray Hyder, American actress and model
  - Jamie Lynn Gray (born 1984), American Olympic sport shooter
- Jane Lewers Gray (1796–1871), Northern Ireland-born American poet and hymnwriter
- Jason Gray (musician) (born 1972), American contemporary Christian singer-songwriter
- Jason Gray (poet), American poet
- Jason Gray-Stanford, Canadian actor
- Jean Gray (physician) (born 1942), English-Canadian physician and professor of pharmacology
- Jeffrey Alan Gray, British psychologist
- Jerry Gray, American football player
- Jerry Gray (arranger), (1915–1976), arranger, composer, and conductor
- Jesse Gray (1923–1988), New York civil right leader and politician
- Jim Gray (sportscaster), American sportscaster
- Jim Gray (UDA member), leader of the Ulster Defence Association in Northern Ireland
- John Gray (disambiguation), multiple people
- Johnny Gray, American 800 m runner
- Jon Gray (born 1991), American baseball player
- Jordan Gray, English comedian and singer
- Joseph Gray (disambiguation), multiple people
- Joseph Anthony Gray, US Congressman from Pennsylvania
- Joseph M. M. Gray, Chancellor of American University from 1933 until 1941
- Josh Gray (disambiguation), multiple people
- Joshua Gray (born 2000), American football player
- Josiah Gray (born 1997), American baseball player
- J. T. Gray (born 1996), American football player
- Julian Gray, English footballer
- Julie E. Gray, British plant molecular biologist

== K ==
- Karla M. Gray, American judge
- Kate Gray, American freestyle skier
- Katherine Gray, Canadian artist
- Kelly Gray (soccer), American soccer player
- Kelly Gray (musician), American producer and guitarist
- Kevin Gray (disambiguation), multiple people

== L ==
- Larry Gray, jazz musician
- Lawrence Gray, American actor
- Lee Gray, American DJ
- Les Gray, English singer
- Linda Gray, American actress
- Linda Esther Gray (born 1948), Scottish opera singer
- Lord Gray, title in the Peerage of Scotland
- Loren Gray (born 2002), American singer and social media personality
- Lorna Gray (1917–2017), American actress
- Louis Harold Gray, British physicist
- Lyons Gray, American politician

== M ==
- Mackenzie Gray (born 1957), Canadian actor
- Macy Gray (born 1967), American R&B, soul and neo-soul singer, songwriter, record producer and actress
- Marion Cameron Gray (1902–1979), Scottish mathematician
- Marlin Gray, American murderer
- Martin Gray (disambiguation), multiple people
- Mary Tenney Gray (1833–1904), American writer, clubwoman, philanthropist, suffragette
- Matt Gray (1936–2016), Scottish footballer (Third Lanark, Manchester City)
- Mel Gray (disambiguation), multiple people
- Michael Gray (DJ), British DJ and house music producer
- Michael Gray (footballer), English football full-back
- Michael John Gray (born c. 1976), member of the Arkansas House of Representatives
- Mike Gray (1935–2013), American writer, screenwriter, cinematographer, film producer and director
- Morris Gray, Canadian politician

== N ==
- Nan Grey, American actress
- Naomi Gray, American, first female Vice President of Planned Parenthood
- Neely Gray, American businessman and territorial legislator
- Neil Gray, Scottish National Party politician
- Nigel Gray, English record producer
- Noah Gray (born 1999), American football player
- Noel Desmond Gray (1920–1999), Australian businessman

== O ==
- Owen Gray (1939–2025), Jamaican musician

== P ==
- Pat Gray, American radio personality
- Patrick Gray, 4th Lord Gray, (died 1584) Scottish nobleman
- Patrick Gray, 6th Lord Gray, (died 1612) Scottish nobleman, grandson of the above
- L. Patrick Gray, acting director of the FBI from 1972 to 1973
- Paul Gray (disambiguation), multiple people
- Percy Gray, American artist
- Peter Gray (disambiguation), multiple people
- Pete Gray (1915–2002), one-armed Major League baseball player
- Pete Gray (activist) (1980–2011), Australian environmental and anti-war activist
- Peyton Gray (born 1995), American baseball player

== Q ==
- Quinn Gray, American football quarterback

== R ==
- Raphael Gray (born 1981), British computer hacker
- Reshanda Gray (born 1993), American basketball player
- Richard Gray (disambiguation), multiple people
- Ricky Gray (1977–2017), American murderer
- Robbie Gray (born 1988), Australian Rules Football player
- Robert Gray (disambiguation), multiple people
- Robin Gray (disambiguation), multiple people
- Rocky Gray (born 1974), American musician and songwriter
- Roger Gray (1881–1959), American character actor
- Roger Gray (1921–1996), professor and expert on agricultural futures markets
- Ron Gray (disambiguation), multiple people
- Ross F. Gray (1920–1945), American soldier, Medal of Honor awardee

== S ==
- Sally Gray, English actress
- Samuel Gray (Australian politician), Australian politician
- Samuel Frederick Gray (1766–1828), British Botanist (IPNI = Gray)
- Selina Gray (1823–1907), enslaved woman who rescued historical heirlooms
- Shelley Shepard Gray, American novelist
- Simon Gray, English playwright
- Sonny Gray (born 1989), American baseball player
- Spalding Gray, American actor, screenwriter and playwright
- Stephen Gray (scientist) (1666–1736), English astronomer and scientist
- Stephen Gray (writer) (1941–2020), South African author
- Steven Gray (footballer) (born 1981), Irish defender for Derry City F.C.
- Stuart Gray (basketball) (born 1963), American basketball player
- Sylvia Gray (1909–1991), English businessperson

== T ==
- T. M. Gray, American horror novelist and illustrator
- Tamyra Gray, American actress and singer
- Thomas Gray, British poet and scholar
- Thomas Gray (VC), British soldier
- Thomas Cecil Gray, British anaesthetist
- Thomas Lomar Gray, British engineer
- Thomas R. Gray, American attorney, diplomat, and author
- Tom Gray, bluegrass musician
- Tony Gray (disambiguation), multiple people
- Trinity Gray (born 1978), American middle-distance runner
- Tristan Gray, American baseball player

== V ==
- Veleka Gray, American actress
- Vincent Gray (American football), American football player
- Vincent C. Gray, American politician
- Vincent R. Gray, New Zealand chemist
- Virgil Gray (born 1984), American football player
- Vivean Gray (1924–2016), British actress based in Australia

== W ==
- Walter de Gray, English prelate and politician
- Walter de Gray Birch, English historian
- Wardell Gray, American jazz bebop saxophonist
- Wayne D. Gray, cognitive science professor
- Wells Gray (1876–1944), Canadian politician, creator of Wells Gray Provincial Park
- William Gray (disambiguation), multiple people
- Willoughby Gray, English actor
- Woodville Gray, Scottish footballer of the 1880s
- Wyndol Gray, (1922–1994), American basketball player

== Z ==
- Zane Gray (later Grey, 1872–1939), American western novelist

== Fictional characters ==
- Alina Gray, in the game Magia Record
- Arthur Gray, in the 1923 novel Scarlet Sails and 1961 film
- Dorian Gray, in Oscar Wilde's The Picture of Dorian Gray
- Mark Gray, in A Nightmare on Elm Street
- Polly Gray, in Peaky Blinders
- Tina Gray (A Nightmare on Elm Street)
- Valerie Gray, in TV series Danny Phantom
- Violet Gray, character from the Peanuts comic strip

== See also ==
- Grey (surname)

== Footnotes ==
- Hanks, Patrick; Hodges, Flavia; Mills, A. D.; Room, Adrian (2002). The Oxford Names Companion. Oxford: the University Press; p. 260
