= Kevin Gray =

Kevin Gray may refer to:

- Kevin Gray (actor) (1958–2013), American actor
- Kevin Gray (footballer) (born 1972), English footballer
- Kevin Gray (engineer), mastering engineer
- Kevin Gray (visual artist) (born 1982), German visual artist
- Kevin Gray (legal scholar), British legal scholar
- Kevin Francis Gray (born 1972), Irish artist
- Kevin Alexander Gray (1957–2023), American political activist and author
