= Flamm =

Flamm is a surname. Notable persons with that name include:

- Albert Flamm (1823–1906), German landscape painter
- Ludwig Flamm (1885-1964), Austrian physicist
- Fanchette Flamm, Austrian table tennis player
- Donald Jason Flamm (1899–1998), American radio pioneer
