= Alan Gray (disambiguation) =

Alan Gray (1855-1935) was a British organist and composer.

Alan Gray may also refer to:

- Alan Gray (footballer) (born 1974), English footballer
- Alan Gray (politician), member of the Missouri House of Representatives

== See also ==
- Alan Gray Martin (1930–2022), Liberal party member of the Canadian House of Commons
- Allan Gray (disambiguation), other people named Allan Gray
- Alan Grey, New Zealand rower
