= Jason Gray =

Jason Gray may refer to:

- Jason Gray (musician) (born 1972), American contemporary Christian singer-songwriter
- Jason Gray (poet), American poet
- Jason Gray, cast member on the American sketch comedy television show Studio C
- Jason Gray (government official), acting administrator of the United States Agency for International Development

== See also ==
- Jason Gray-Stanford (born 1970), Canadian film, television actor and voice actor
