= Edward Gray =

Edward or Eddie Gray may refer to:

- Eddie Gray (Australian footballer) (1915–2009), Australian rules footballer for Collingwood
- Eddie Gray (footballer, born 1934), Scottish former professional footballer
- Eddie Gray (footballer, born 1948), former Leeds United and Scotland international footballer, former manager
- Eddie Gray (musician) (1948–2026), American guitarist, member of Tommy James and the Shondells
- Eddie Gray (racing driver) (1920–1969), race car driver
- 'Monsewer' Eddie Gray (1898–1969), British music hall entertainer
- Ed Gray (born 1975), basketball player
- Ed Gray (Canadian football) (1934–1976), Canadian football player
- Ted Gray (1924–2011), baseball player
- Edward Gray (tennis), American tennis player
- Edward Leslie Gray (1895–1992), politician and member of the Legislative Assembly of Alberta from Alberta, Canada
- Edward W. Gray (1870–1942), United States Representative from New Jersey
- Edward Whitaker Gray (1748–1806), English botanist and secretary to the Royal Society
- Edward George Gray (1924–1999), British anatomist and neuroscientist

== See also ==
- Edmund Grey (disambiguation)
- Edward Grey (disambiguation)
- Gray (surname)
