= Elizabeth Grey =

Elizabeth Gray or Grey may refer to:

== People ==
- Elizabeth Gray (Irish artist) (1837–1903), Irish artist
- Elizabeth Gray (British artist) (1928–2022), British artist
- Elizabeth Gray (broadcaster) (c. 1937–2023), Canadian radio broadcaster
- Elizabeth Gray (fossil collector) (1831–1924), Scottish malacologist
- Elizabeth Grey, 6th Baroness Lisle (c. 1482–c. 1525), English noble woman who flourished during the reigns of Henry VII and VIII
- Elizabeth Grey, Countess of Kildare (c. 1497 – after 1548), English noblewoman, and the second wife of Irish peer Gerald FitzGerald, 9th Earl of Kildare
- Elizabeth Grey, 5th Baroness Lisle (1505–1519), Tudor noblewoman jilted for Mary Tudor
- Elizabeth Grey, Countess of Kent (1582–1651), née Elizabeth Talbot, daughter of the Earl of Shrewsbury
- Elizabeth Caroline Gray (1810–1887), Scottish historian
- Elizabeth Caroline Grey (1798–1869), English author
- Elizabeth Gray Vining (1902–1999), born Elizabeth Gray, librarian
- Elizabeth Woodville (c. 1437–1492), married name Elizabeth Grey, her second husband was Edward IV of England
- Eliza Grey (1822–1898), wife of the prime minister of New Zealand

== Fictional entities ==
- Elizabeth "Polly" Grey, a fictional character in the TV series Peaky Blinders

== See also ==
- Betsy Gray (died 1798), Ulster-Scots Presbyterian peasant girl who took part of the 1798 Rebellion of the United Irishmen
- Betty Gray (1920–2018), Welsh table tennis player
