= James P. Gray =

James P. Gray may refer to:

- Jim Gray (jurist) (James Polin Gray), American jurist, writer and Libertarian Party candidate
- Jim Gray (American politician) (James P. Gray II), mayor of Lexington, Kentucky
- James P. Gray (New Hampshire politician), member of the New Hampshire Senate, and previously of the New Hampshire House of Representatives

== See also ==
- James Gray (disambiguation)
