= Jamie Gray =

Jamie Gray may refer to:

- Jamie Gray (footballer) (born 1998), Irish footballer, currently playing for Stevenage
- Jamie Gray (murderer), a British murderer
- Jamie Gray Hyder (born 1985), American actress and model
- Jamie Lynn Gray (born 1984), American Olympic sport shooter

== See also ==
- James Gray (disambiguation)
