= Charles Grey =

Charles Grey may refer to:

== People ==
- Charles Grey, 7th Earl of Kent (1540s–1623), Lord Lieutenant of Bedfordshire
- Charles Grey, 1st Earl Grey (1729–1807), British Army general
- Charles Grey, 2nd Earl Grey (1764–1845), British prime minister, after whom Earl Grey tea is named
- Sir Charles Edward Grey (1785–1865), British member of parliament (MP) for Tynemouth and North Shields, then governor of Barbados, 1841–1846
- Charles Grey (British Army officer) (1804–1870), British Army general, member of parliament for Wycombe, and private secretary to Prince Albert and Queen Victoria
- Charles Grey (mayor) (1859–1925), New Zealand businessman and mayor of Auckland City
- C. G. Grey (Charles Grey Grey, 1875–1953), English aviation writer
- Charles Grey, 5th Earl Grey (1879–1963), English nobleman
- Charles Gossage Grey (1894–1987), American World War I flying ace
- Charles Grey (Labour politician) (1903–1984), British member of parliament for Durham, 1945–1970
- Edwin Charles Tubb (1919–2010), British writer who used Charles Grey as a pseudonym

== Television characters ==
- Charles Grey (The Unit), fictional character in United States television series The Unit
- Colonel White, a character in the TV series Captain Scarlet whose "real" name is Charles Grey

== See also ==
- Charles Gray (disambiguation)
