= Edward Grey =

Edward Grey may refer to:

- Edward Grey, 1st Viscount Grey of Fallodon (1862–1933), British Liberal Foreign Secretary in First World War
- Edward Grey, 1st Viscount Lisle (died 1492), English nobleman who was created Viscount Lisle in 1483
- Eddie Grey (1918–2004), Sri Lankan sportsman and police officer
- Edward Grey (bishop) (1782–1837), Anglican clergyman
- Edward Grey (died 1676) (1611–1676), English politician
- Sir Edward Grey, a fictional character in the Hellboy universe
- Ned Grey (1896–1974), hurler

== See also ==
- Edward Gray (disambiguation)
- Ted Grey, writer
- Edmund Grey (disambiguation)
