= HMS Urge =

British submarine

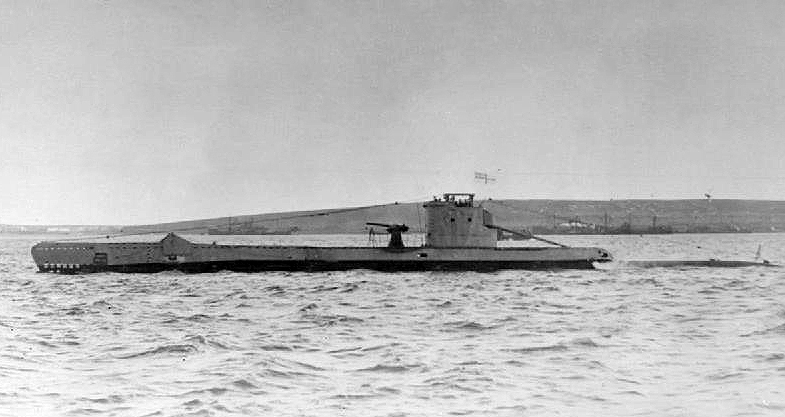
- HMS Urge

History

United Kingdom
- Name: Urge
- Builder: Vickers Armstrong, Barrow-in-Furness
- Laid down: 30 October 1939
- Launched: 19 August 1940
- Commissioned: 12 December 1940
- Fate: Sunk by German mine off Malta, 27 April 1942
- Badge

General characteristics
- Class & type: U-class submarine
- Displacement: Surfaced – 540 tons standard, 630 tons full load; Submerged – 730 tons
- Length: 58.22 m (191 ft)
- Beam: 4.90 m (16 ft 1 in)
- Draught: 4.62 m (15 ft 2 in)
- Propulsion: 2 shaft diesel-electric; 2 Paxman Ricardo diesel generators + electric motors; 615 / 825 hp
- Speed: 11.25 knots (20.8 km/h) max surfaced; 10 knots (19 km/h) max submerged
- Complement: 32
- Armament: 4 bow internal 21-inch (533 mm) torpedo tubes, 10 torpedoes; 1 – QF 12-pdr (3 in (76 mm) gun

HMS Urge was a British U-class submarine, of the second group of that class, built by Vickers Armstrong, Barrow-in-Furness. She was laid down on 30 October 1939, and was commissioned on 12 December 1940. From 1941 to 1942 she formed part of the 10th Submarine Flotilla based in Malta and spent most of her career operating in the Mediterranean, where she damaged and sank enemy warships and merchant vessels and undertook both SBS and SIS special operations. She was commanded by Lieutenant-Commander Edward Philip Tomkinson, DSO, RN. She was lost with all hands and a number of naval passengers (and one war correspondent) on 27 April 1942 after striking a German mine off Malta.

Urge had an intensive 20-patrol career lasting a little over a year before her loss. In December 1941, Lieutenant-Commander Tomkinson received the DSO and bar, was mentioned in dispatches, and at his request, received two years' seniority in lieu of a second bar to the DSO; in 1942, further awards to Tomkinson were pending for the torpedoing of the Italian battleship Vittorio Veneto on 14 December 1941 and the sinking of the Italian cruiser Giovanni delle Bande Nere on 1 April 1942, but he was lost before these awards could be made.

Vice Admiral Sir Arthur Hezlet stated in his history of British Submarines in WWII that had Tomkinson survived he would “almost certainly” have received a third bar to the DSO. Vice-Admiral Sir Ian McGeogh, a postwar Flag Officer Submarines who served briefly on Urge in 1941, wrote that Tomkinson "should in my view have been awarded the Victoria Cross – preferably before he was lost." HMS Urge's crew were awarded a number of Distinguished Service Crosses and Distinguished Service Medals. The first lieutenant was Lieutenant JMS Poole, DSC and Bar, RN. The chief petty officer, CJJ Jackman, was awarded the DSM and Bar and mentioned in despatches three times. At the time of her loss, the commander-in-chief Mediterranean reported to the Admiralty that the "loss of this outstanding submarine and commanding officer is much to be regretted."

Urge was adopted and partially funded by the people of the Welsh town Bridgend, as a result of the national "warship week" in 1941.

In 1948 a building at the shore establishment HMS Dolphin in Gosport was named after HMS Urge (along with other famous WWII submarines). In 1975, another building at HMS Dolphin was named after Lieutenant-Commander Tomkinson, alongside others named after other leading Royal Navy World War II submarine captains.

In late October 2019, it was announced that a maritime archeology project (Project Spur) had discovered the wreck of the submarine off the coast of Malta. The project was led by Timmy Gambin of the Archeology and Classics Department of the University of Malta, Francis Dickinson, a grandson of Lieutenant-Commander Tomkinson, and Platon Alexiades, a naval researcher from Canada. The search was conducted by a team led by Professor Gambin.

In 2022 a memorial to those who lost their lives while serving in HMS Urge was unveiled at Fort St Elmo in Malta by the President of Malta and the British High Commissioner to Malta. The unveiling formed part of a number of events to commemorate those lost, which included a wreath laying at sea and was attended by HMS Urge families and friends and the Royal Navy Submarine Service.

== Career ==
Prior to deployment to the Mediterranean, Urge sank the 10,750 ton Italian tanker Franco Martelli in April 1941, whilst in the Bay of Biscay, on passage from the UK to Gibraltar. Urge also torpedoed and damaged the Italian merchant ship Aquitania which barely made it back to port with decks awash. Urge also torpedoed the Italian merchant ship Marigola which had already been grounded after being torpedoed by aircraft on 24 September 1941. Then on 14 December, Urge torpedoed and damaged the Italian battleship Vittorio Veneto during operations around the First Battle of Sirte. In the same attack, the Italian battleship Littorio narrowly avoided being hit by Urge's torpedoes through taking evasive action. One of the crew on Urge at that time was Lieutenant Godfrey Place, who would later become famous as one of the leaders of the Operation Source attack on the German battleship Tirpitz. On 1 April 1942, Urge torpedoed and sank the Italian cruiser Giovanni delle Bande Nere. The attack was made by Lieutenant-Commander Tomkinson at a range of 5,000 yards and the impact of two torpedo hits caused the Italian warship to break in two and sink rapidly.

Urge was one of the first British submarines to land commandos by canoe (or folding kayak), and a number of successful commando raids were launched from her (including by Lieutenant Wilson and Corporal Hughes in summer 1941, when they were early members of the Special Boat Section). These raids targeted enemy infrastructure such as railways and pioneered techniques used in later Special Boat Service work. However, special operations were hazardous, and in October 1941, a member of Urge's crew (Sub Lt Brian Lloyd) was lost to enemy fire when attempting to rescue an Allied agent from shore. Urge's torpedoes were sighted and avoided, suffered gyro failures, or otherwise failed to hit the target (or failed to detonate) on a number of occasions including attacks on the Italian merchant vessel Capo Orso, the Italian tankers Superga and Pozarica, the German merchant ship Ingo, the Italian cruiser Bolzano, and the Italian troop transport Victoria.

In Spring 1942 Urge was closing on an unidentified armed merchant cruiser south of the Strait of Messina, when explosives recently laid by her SBS commandos detonated and destroyed a train. This alerted the merchant ship to Urge's presence, forcing Lt Cdr Tomkinson to attack at long distance. At that range the torpedoes missed so the submarine subsequently closed the range before attacking and damaging the merchant ship with gunfire on the surface, but broke off the attack due to accurate return fire. A number of other possible successes remain unclear.

In October 1941, a technical failure in at least one torpedo which Urge fired at a U-boat caused the weapon to miss the enemy and then circle explode dangerously near Urge herself. This had happened earlier in the same patrol frustrating another attack by Urge on a merchant ship. The defects in the weapons provided to Urge also affected other Royal Navy submarine attacks at the time and urgent action was taken by the RN to address these faults in the weaponry provided to the submarine.

As the Siege of Malta intensified, bombing of the base of the 10th Submarine Flotilla caused the difficult decision to withdraw it from Malta to set up a new base of operations at Alexandria in Egypt. On 27 April 1942, Urge set sail for Alexandria, with 32 crew, 11 naval passengers and a war correspondent. She failed to arrive at Alexandria on 6 May 1942, and was reported overdue on that day. Until the discovery of her wreck in 2019, her final fate was not completely certain. She had struck a mine, while she was still on the surface, soon after exiting the Grand Harbour. The explosion was violent and the bow of the submarine became detached (possibly after impact on the sea bed) as the submarine sank suddenly, with no survivors. Among those lost, and on board unofficially, was war correspondent, Bernard Gray.

== Discovery of wreck ==
Official sources including the Flotilla Captain GWG Simpson’s report on HMS Urge's loss had long attributed her sinking to a mine outside Malta. By the end of April 1942 enemy air raids had destroyed several British submarines in their Malta base and the Royal Navy’s local minesweeping capability. Submarine operations had therefore become temporarily unviable, partly due to direct bombing and partly due to the enemy minefields around Malta, which if not swept, were extremely hazardous to submarines whenever they entered or left Malta. The dangers of the enemy minefields were made clear a few days after Urge's disappearance, in early May 1942, when another RN submarine HMS Olympus struck a mine when leaving Malta and sank with heavy loss of life. This reinforced the view that Urge had been lost to a minefield, especially as neither German nor Italian forces made any claim to have destroyed a British submarine at this time.

Post-war this view continued to prevail, although without physical evidence verification of an enemy mine as the cause of loss was not possible. In the 1970s some consideration was given to whether an enemy destroyer possibly caused the loss, before this idea was discounted. On 16 April 2015 Belgian diver Jean-Pierre Misson claimed to have found the wreck of Urge based on sonar recordings taken off the coast of Libya, at Marsa el Hilal. The site was not dived, and the sonar images were ambiguous. No physical evidence was obtained. It is possible that if they identified a wreck (which remains in doubt) it could be that of German submarine U-205 which foundered at Ras Hilal, while being towed by the corvette Gloxinia after capture on 17 February 1943. On 26 February 1943 the U-205 wreck was visited by British divers led by Cdr. Bartlett. In 2003, a hydrographic survey of Ras Hilal located only one wreck, that of U-205, in almost the exact position reported in 1943 documents. No other wrecks were located there, and a number of other key data points also rendered the Ras Hilal theory doubtful. The U.K. Ministry of Defence (MOD) did not endorse the Ras Hilal claim.

On 30 October 2019 it was announced that the wreck of Urge had been found in 130 m (430 ft) of water two miles (three point two kilometres) off the coast of Malta. The search project was conducted by a team from the University of Malta, in an area that had been heavily mined during the war. The wreck has heavy damage including to the bow which is consistent with striking a mine. The rest of the wreck is said to be in "fantastic condition." The wreck had been discovered a few months earlier, but no announcement was made until the MOD had had an opportunity to consider the available evidence and to confirm the view that the remains were indeed those of the missing Urge.

The MOD initially confirmed the view of the Project Spur team that the wreck was that of Urge, using the first images and examining the wreck features in the context of contemporaneous documents and records. Although the identification was almost complete, final certainty then came in May 2021 when a specialist team of deep divers from the University of Malta and Heritage Malta dived the wreck and verified Urge's name in letters on the conning tower, among other features (this work had been delayed by the COVID pandemic). The dives enabled the MOD definitively to confirm the identification of the wreck as that of Urge. The wreck site is the officially recognised war grave of the 44 people lost aboard the submarine on 27 April 1942.

The May 2021 dive teams were led by Professor Timmy Gambin of the University of Malta. Working with Francis Dickinson and Platon Alexiades, Timmy Gambin had led the search team which discovered Urge's wreck in 2019. A number of years earlier, Timmy Gambin had previously discovered the wreck of HMS Olympus, which had been lost on the same German minefield. This was part of his work to map the underwater history of Malta. In the 2021 dives, the capital letters 'URGE' were seen intact on the port side of the conning tower by the dive teams.

On 27 April 2022, the 80th anniversary of HMS Urge's loss, the President of Malta His Excellency Dr. George Vella and the British High Commissioner Katherine Ward LVO OBE, unveiled a memorial at Fort St. Elmo to HMS Urge, Lieutenant Commander Tomkinson, his ship’s company, naval passengers, and a war correspondent lost as a result of the sinking. In addition to these 44 personnel, the HMS Urge Memorial at Fort St Elmo also honours Sub Lt Brian Lloyd, who was killed whilst undertaking a special mission from Urge in October 1941. The commemoration was attended by families and friends of those lost in HMS Urge, representatives of the Governments of Malta and the U.K. and other senior figures, the Armed Forces of Malta, the Submarine Service of the Royal Navy and many Maltese and international organizations. The previous Sunday a service had been held at St Paul’s Pro-Cathedral, Valletta to remember those lost in the submarine, and there is now a brass plaque honouring them within the cathedral.
