= Edmund Grey =

Edmund Grey or Gray is the name of:

- Edmund Grey (MP for Lynn) (died 1547), MP for Lynn
- Edmund Grey (All My Children), fictional television character in U.S. soap opera, All My Children
- Edmund Grey, 1st Earl of Kent (1416–1490), English nobleman
- Edmund Dwyer Gray (1845–1888), Home Rule League MP in the Parliament of the United Kingdom and newspaper proprietor
  - Edmund Dwyer-Gray (1870–1945), his son, also a politician and newspaper proprietor, who became Premier of Tasmania
- Edmund Gray (1878–1964), Australian politician

== See also ==
- Edward Gray (disambiguation)
- Edward Grey (disambiguation)
