= Anthony Gray =

Anthony or Tony Gray may refer to:

== People ==
- Tony Gray (comics), Canadian artist and writer
- Tony Gray (cricketer) (born 1963), West Indian cricketer
- Tony Gray (rugby union) (born 1942), former Wales rugby union player and coach
- Tony Gray (1927–2014), member of the comedy troupe The Alberts

== Fictional characters ==
- Anthony Gray, a character in The Wire

== See also ==
- Anthony Grey (disambiguation)
- Tony Grey (disambiguation)
