= Ronald Gray (disambiguation) =

Ronald Gray (born 1965) is an American convicted serial murderer and rapist.

Ronald Gray may also refer to:

- Ronald Gray (athlete) (1932–2019), Australian athlete
- Ronald Gray (painter) (1868–1951), British painter
- Ronald E. Gray, American politician in Delaware

== See also ==
- Ron Gray (disambiguation)
