= Cecil Gray =

Cecil Gray may refer to:

- Cecil Gray (American football) (born 1968), former American football player
- Cecil Gray (composer) (1895–1951), Scottish music critic and composer
- Cecil Gray (cricketer) (1902–1990), Australian cricketer
- Cecil Gray (poet) (1923–2020), Caribbean poet, former educator and author
