= Donald Jason Flamm =

American radio pioneer (1899–1998)

Donald J. Flamm
- Born: December 11, 1899; Pittsburgh, Pennsylvania, U.S.
- Died: February 15, 1998 (aged 98); Palm Beach, Florida, U.S.
- Occupation: Broadcaster

Donald J. Flamm (December 11, 1899 – February 15, 1998) was an American radio pioneer. He worked for the Shubert Brothers and for such stars as Al Jolson and Milton Berle. He owned numerous radio stations beginning with New York City’s WMCA, and is credited with founding ABSIE (American Broadcasting Station in Europe), the precursor of the Voice of America.

== Early life ==
Flamm was born in Pittsburgh but attended New York City schools.

== Career in broadcasting ==
From a young age, Flamm was very active in the New York cultural scene. He produced plays and in 1926 published a book of poems. When the radio station WMCA began operating in February 1925, Flamm produced much of the on-air content. Flamm was listed as the owner of WMCA from 1926. During the embryonic age of radio broadcasting, Flamm and WMCA were involved in many pioneering activities, making WMCA one of the nation’s leading radio broadcasting stations. He was forced to sell the WMCA in 1940.

In the mid-1940s, Flamm was offered a broadcasting job at the Office of War Information, operating radio stations for the U.S. troops in Europe. This network, called ABSIE, or the American Broadcast Station in Europe, is regarded as the forerunner of the Voice of America. Flamm is sometimes mentioned as the founder of VOA.

After the war, Flamm returned to private broadcasting and at various times owned a number of radio stations. In 1960, he purchased WMMM-Westport, Connecticut, which expanded with FM station WDJF (his initials) in 1970. He also owned WPAT and WPAT-FM in Paterson, New Jersey. He sold the Westport stations in the 1980s.

=== Sale of WMCA ===
In December 1940, well-connected investors forced Donald Flamm to sell WMCA to industrialist and former Undersecretary of Commerce Edward J. Noble for $850,000. This was about $400,000 less than its market value and the offer Flamm had previously refused from the president’s son, Elliott Roosevelt. Noble told Flamm that he would get his station “no matter what” or his Federal Communications Commission (FCC) license would be taken away. Noble was a friend of top White House aide Thomas Corcoran, and the purchase was handled by former FCC chief counsel William Dempsey, who shared offices with Corcoran. Later investigation showed that Flamm had succeeded in reaching President Franklin D. Roosevelt’s attention and that the president’s aide, General Edwin Watson, had asked the FCC to intervene. However, Corcoran had then countermanded Watson’s order.

Flamm disputed the transaction and filed suit against Noble. The sale resulted in a Congressional investigation, an FCC investigation, and lawsuits that reached the New York Supreme Court by 1949. Flamm was eventually paid a settlement but did not get ownership of WMCA. Noble had sold the station in 1943 to Nathan Straus, former Federal Housing Authority administrator, for $1,250,000 in order to found the “Blue Network,” which became the American Broadcasting Company (ABC). The Congressional investigation of the FCC absolved Noble, but drew a blistering dissent from the Republican minority. In 1944, lawyer John J. Sirica resigned as chief counsel to the Select Committee in protest of the handling of the case.

== Personal life ==
Donald Flamm was very prominent in Jewish circles. He was an Honorary Life Member of the National Commission of the Anti-Defamation League (ADL), and endowed the Donald Flamm chair of communications of the ADL. In 1939, he was involved in a controversy with radio priest Father Coughlin after Flamm took Coughlin's anti-semitic broadcasts off WMCA.

Flamm retired to Palm Beach, Florida, where he died on February 15, 1998.
