= Alfred Gray =

Alfred or Alf Gray may refer to:

- Alfred Gray (Kansas politician) (1830–1880), American politician from Kansas
- Alfred Gray (mathematician) (1939–1998), American mathematician
- Alfred M. Gray Jr. (1928–2024), US Marine Corps general
- Alf Gray (English footballer) (1910–1974), English football half back
- Alf Gray (Australian footballer) (1874–1931), played for Essendon

== See also ==
- Alf Grey (born 1935), English former football referee
