= Anstruther Musomanik Society =

Scottish poetry and literary society

Anstruther Musomanik Society was a poetry and literary society.

== History ==
The society was formed in 1813 in the coastal town of Anstruther in Fife. It wound up four years later.

== Activities ==
The society met regularly, exchanging and sharing poetry and songs in a place they named the "Hall of Apollo". It had a "code of laws", and a "licence to rhyme", called a "diploma". The tone of the meetings was fun and jovial, with allusions to the classical tradition, focusing on devotion to Apollo, the Greek and Roman God of music, dance and poetry. The Hall of Apollo was decorated with flowers, laurels, and prints of celebrated poets such as Walter Scott, Lord Byron and Robert Burns.

At the ordinary meetings, members would given a partially completed poem, which they were expected to complete on the spur of the moment. Their annual celebrations were grander affairs.

The society possessed a seal charged with the Celtic harp, bearing an anchor on its chords and surrounded by a chaplet.

== Notable Members ==
- George Dempster of Dunnichen
- Charles Gray (songwriter) author of 'Lays and Lyrics'
- James Hogg
- Andrew Johnston (Scottish politician)
- Walter Scott
- William Tennant, author of 'Anster Fair'
