= Charles Gray =

Charles Gray may refer to:

- Charles Gray (Colchester MP) (1696–1782), member of parliament for Colchester, 1742–1755, 1761–1780
- Charles Gray (songwriter) (1782–1851), Royal Marines captain and songwriter
- Charles McNeill Gray (1807–1885), American politician, mayor of Chicago, 1853–1854
- Charles Wing Gray (1845–1920), British member of parliament for Maldon, 1886–1892
- Charles Gray (New Zealand politician) (1853–1918), member of parliament for Christchurch North, 1905–1908
- Charlie Gray (baseball) (1864–1900), American baseball pitcher
- Charles Gray (Canadian politician) (1879–1954), mayor of Winnipeg, 1919–1920
- Charles H. Gray (1921–2008), American actor
- Charles Gray (actor) (1928–2000), British actor
- Sir Charles Gray (Scottish politician) (1929–2023), Scottish local politician and leader of Strathclyde Regional Council, 1986–1992
- Sir Charles Gray (judge) (1942–2022), English High Court judge
- Charles Gray (diplomat) (born 1953), former British ambassador to Morocco and HM Marshal of the Diplomatic Corps
- Chuck Gray (Arizona politician) (born 1958), former Arizonan state senator and member of the Arizona House of Representative
- Charles Gray (musician) (born 1976), also known as Ultra Kyu, American former member of The Aquabats and operatic baritone
- Charlie Gray (footballer) (born 2006), English footballer

== See also ==
- Charles Grey (disambiguation)
