= Mel Gray =

Mel Gray may refer to:

- Mel Gray (journalist), managing editor of Air Force Times
- Mel Gray (return specialist) (born 1961), former American football return specialist
- Mel Gray (wide receiver) (born 1948), former American football wide receiver
