= Anthony Grey (disambiguation) =

Anthony Grey (1938–2025) was a British journalist.

Anthony Grey or Tony Grey may also refer to:

- Anthony Grey, Earl of Harold (1695–1723), British peer and courtier
- Anthony Grey, 11th Earl of Kent (1645–1702)
- Anthony Grey, 9th Earl of Kent (1557–1643)
- Antony Grey (1927–2010), English LGBT rights activist

== See also ==
- Anthony Gray (disambiguation)
