= Edmund Gray (Missouri politician) =

American politician

Edmund Gray was an American politician who represented Scott County in the Missouri state legislature from 1870 to 1872. Gray was born August 20, 1834, in Cincinnati, Ohio. From age 15 until 1854, Gray lived in St. Louis. Many years Gray worked as a boat pilot on the Mississippi and Ohio rivers, building a steamboat named The Last Resort in 1867. In September 1898, he surveyed and platted the original town of Grays Point, Missouri.
