= Allan Gray =

Allan Gray is a name that may refer to:

- Allan Gray (composer) (1902–1973), Polish-born composer
- Allan Gray (footballer) (born 1943), Scottish footballer
- Allan Gray (company), a South African investment management firm
- Allan Gray (investor) (1938–2019), South African investor and businessman

== See also ==
- Alan Grayson (born 1958), United States Representative for Florida's 9th congressional district
- Alan Gray (disambiguation)
