= Christopher Gray =

Christopher or Chris Gray may refer to:

- Christopher Gray (architectural historian) (1950–2017), American journalist and architectural historian
- Christopher Gray (organist), British choral conductor and organist
- Christopher S. Gray (born 1964), United States Navy admiral
- Chris Gray (American football) (born 1970), offensive lineman
- Chris Gray (Coronation Street), a fictional character on the British soap opera Coronation Street
- Chris Gray (rugby union) (born 1960), rugby player for the Scotland national rugby union team
- Chris Gray (situationist) (1942–2009), activist in the Situationist International
- Chris Gray (video game developer), video game developer of Fiendish Freddy's Big Top O'Fun
- Christopher Gray, founder of Scholly
- Chris Gray, vocalist for the band the Black Maria
