= Robin Grey (disambiguation) =

Robin Edward Dysart Grey (1886–1974) was an Australian banker.

Robin Grey may also refer to:

- Robyn Grey-Gardner
- Robin Gray (disambiguation)
