= James Lorne Gray =

Canadian civil servant

- Born: March 2, 1913; Brandon, Manitoba, Canada
- Died: March 2, 1987 (aged 74); Deep River, Ontario, Canada
- Education: University of Saskatchewan
- Awards: Order of Canada

James Lorne Gray, CC (March 2, 1913 – March 2, 1987) was a Canadian administrator and President of Atomic Energy of Canada Limited (AECL) from 1958 to 1974.

Born in Brandon, Manitoba, he received a B. Eng in 1935 and a M.Sc. (Mech. Eng.) in 1938 from the University of Saskatchewan. In 1939, he was a lecturer in engineering at the University of Saskatchewan. During World War II, he served in the Royal Canadian Air Force achieving the rank of Wing Commander.

After the war from 1945 to 1946, he was associate director-general in the research and development division of the department of Reconstruction and Supply in Ottawa. From 1946 to 1948, he was with Montreal Armature Works Limited. In 1948, he was the scientific assistant to the President of the National Research Council of Canada (NRC). From 1949 to 1952, he was the Chief of Administration for the NRC Chalk River project. In 1952, he joined AECL as a General Manager, became a Vice-President in 1954, and became President in 1958, retiring in 1974.

In 1969, he was made a Companion of the Order of Canada. He was awarded honorary degrees from the University of British Columbia and the University of Saskatchewan.
