= Robin Gray =

Robin Gray may refer to:

- Robin Gray (Australian politician) (born 1940), former Australian politician, Premier of Tasmania, 1982–1989
- Robin Gray (curler) (born 1963), Irish male curler
- Robin Gray (New Zealand politician) (1931–2022), New Zealand politician
- Auld Robin Gray, a 1772 Scots ballad written by Lady Anne Lindsay

== See also ==
- Robin Grey (disambiguation)
