= Scholly =

Scholarship search app

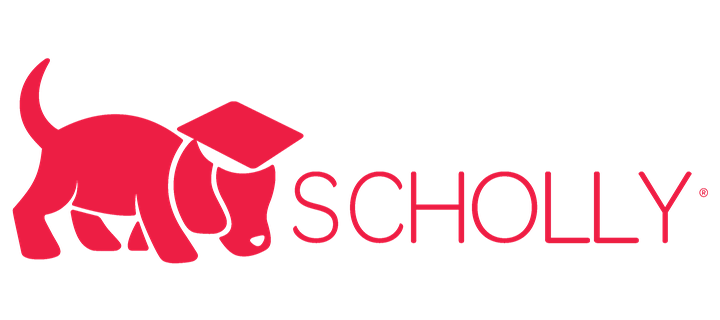
- Available in: English
- Founded: 2013; 13 years ago in Philadelphia, Pennsylvania, United States
- Founders: Christopher Gray; Nick Pirollo; Bryson Alef
- CEO: Christopher Gray
- Key people: Christopher Gray
- Industry: Education, University
- Products: Scholly Payoff, Scholly
- Revenue: US$30 million (2023, cumulative)
- Parent: Sallie Mae
- Website: https://myscholly.com/
- Commercial: Yes
- Users: 5 million (as of March 2024)
- Current status: online

Scholly is an American scholarship web and app search platform developed by Christopher Gray. The platform makes custom recommendations for postsecondary scholarships by matching students to the scholarships they personally qualify for. It uses a variety of parameters (such as gender, state, GPA, race, etc.) to filter and deliver a targeted list of appropriate scholarships along with links and deadlines.

== History ==
=== Founding ===
The company was founded by Christopher Gray. The eldest of three siblings raised by a single mother, his mother had just lost her job at a call center in the 2008 recession. As the first child in his family to go to college, Gray searched for scholarships online as a way to pay for his fees and tuition, and eventually earned $1.3 million in scholarships.

While attending Drexel University, he founded Scholly with web developers Nick Pirollo and Bryson Alef.

=== Growth ===
Gray appeared in ABC's Shark Tank, where entrepreneurs try to convince a panel of financiers (Mark Cuban, Daymond John, Kevin O'Leary, Lori Greiner, Robert Herjavec) to invest in their business. Gray secured $40,000 in capital from Greiner and John, which sparked an intense disagreement with the other three after Gray exited the room.

Within hours after the episode aired, the Scholly site received 80,000 requests in a few hours. Since December 2016, 5 million users have downloaded the app. Scholly generated over $30 million in cumulative revenue by 2023.

In 2023, Scholly was acquired by educational lender Sallie Mae for an undisclosed sum. The app, which was previously $2.99 USD to download, will become free of charge.
