= Martin Gray =

Martin Gray may refer to:

- Martin Gray (footballer) (born 1971), English former footballer and manager
- Martin Gray (priest) (born 1944), Archdeacon of Lynn
- Martin Gray (writer) (1922–2016), Polish emigrant to the United States and then France who served in the Red Army and NKVD but also claims to be a survivor of the Holocaust

== See also ==
- Martín Garay (born 1999), Argentine footballer
- Marty Gray, a 1970 single by Billie Jo Spears
