= Barry Gray (radio personality) =

American radio personality (1916–1996)

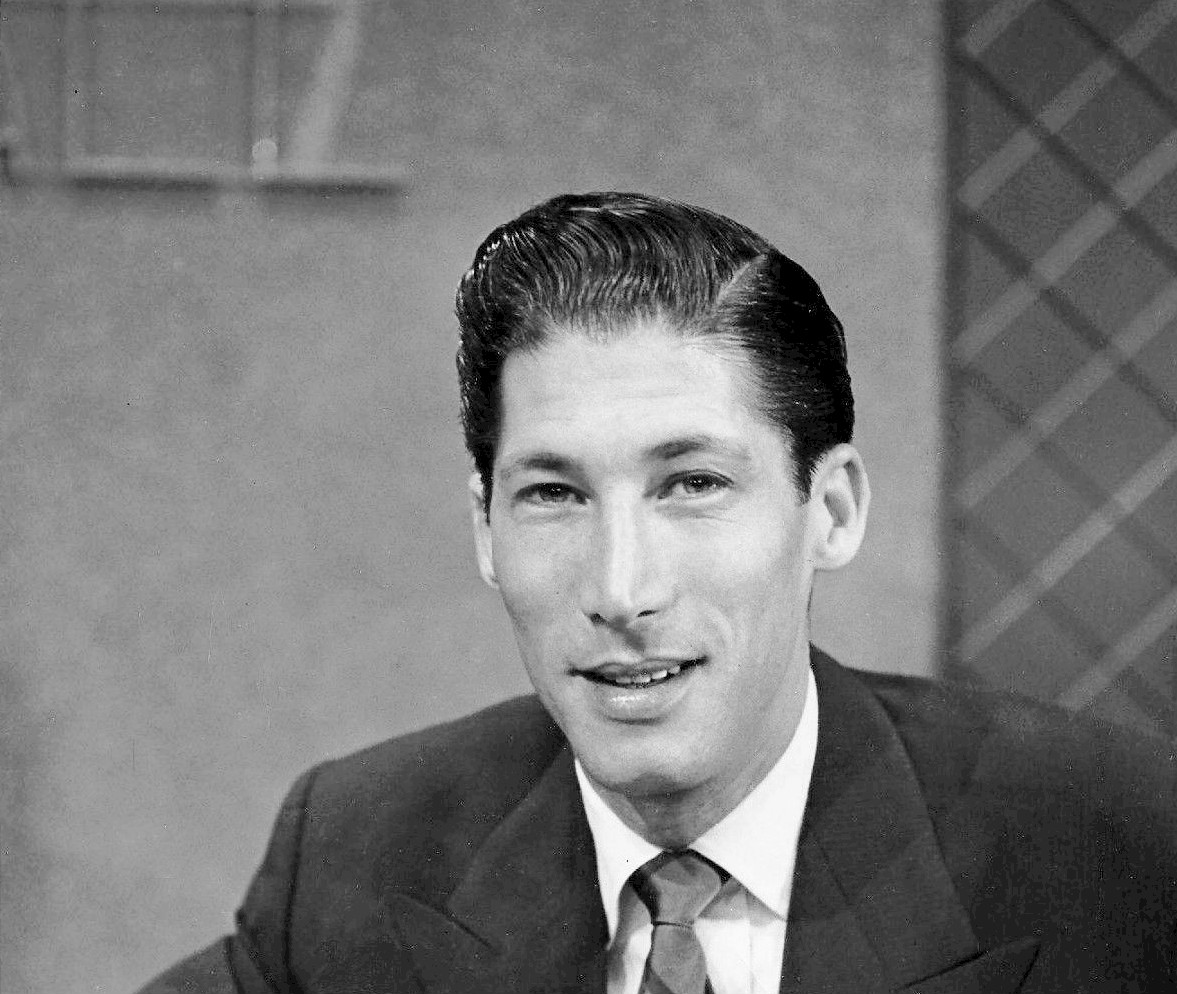
- Barry Gray in 1951

Personal details
- Born: Bernard Yaroslaw; July 2, 1916 Red Lion, New Jersey
- Died: December 21, 1996 (aged 80) Manhattan, New York City, New York
- Known for: Talk radio

Barry Gray (born Bernard Yaroslaw, July 2, 1916 – December 21, 1996) was an American radio personality. He is frequently referred to as "The Father of Talk Radio" for his significant contributions to the radio industry.

== Early New York career ==
In 1945, Barry Gray initially worked as a disc jockey and worked for radio station WOR, when big band leader Woody Herman called in while Gray was talking about him. Gray broadcast the call, and the spontaneous live interview was such a hit with both his listeners and station bosses that the talk radio format resulted. Gray subsequently began doing listener call-ins as well.

WOR officials realized the attraction of the talk format, and Gray worked an overnight shift there from 1945 to 1948 or 1949, interviewing public figures from Al Jolson to Adam Clayton Powell Jr. He also broadcast for WMGM from the Copacabana night club in the late 1940s. In addition, in 1947 he hosted the New York-based show Scout About Town. The August 5, 1947, episode of Scout About Town included the radio network debut of Martin and Lewis.

In 1949, Gray portrayed his role as a disc jockey in the 1949 short subject Spin That Splatter.

Gray was a pioneer in early television broadcasts, first as the host of The Barry Gray Show on New York's WOR-TV when Channel 9 went on the air in 1949, then more visibly as host of the first Goodson and Todman game show Winner Take All, replacing Bud Collyer in 1951.

== Miami radio and nightclubs ==
In the fall of 1948 and into 1949, Gray broadcast on WMIE-AM radio from three Miami Beach nightclubs (the Copa Lounge, Danny and Doc's Jewel Box and the Martha Raye Club) nightly, before he left the Miami area due to an incident in which Gray bopped an audience member with his microphone while he was on the air. The impact of the hit was audible and had been preceded by hot words of anger. This recollection came fifty-eight years later from Ernest W. Bennett of Miami, who listened to Gray's broadcast every weeknight beginning in Bennett's sophomore year at the University of Miami in the fall of 1948.

Carl Warner, a retired newspaper publisher living in Clinton, Tennessee, was then the remote engineer for the Barry Gray Miami Beach broadcasts. He also recalls hearing a loud bang in his headphones and looking up to the Copa Lounge stage, seeing the podium turned over and Barry signaling him to cut the mics. After about 30 seconds of dead air, he asked for his mike to be turned on.

Bennett recalls other reports of Gray's other pugnacious altercations. This final audible one brought on Gray's departure. Gray said, as Bennett recalls the exciting live-broadcast event, "I just hit the guy over the head with my microphone, folks." The alleged victim was Reubin Clein, publisher of Miami Life. Reubin Clein was considered an agitator and generally an aggressive character, who was a former boxer.

According to Bennett, Gray was popular on Miami radio: "He was very big here; number one, like Larry King is known today. Indeed, Larry King began his broadcasting career from a houseboat anchored in front of the Miami Beach Fontainebleau Hotel in 1957."

== Return and long career in New York radio ==
Gray was known as a fierce critic of bigotry, having lived through McCarthyism and the Red Scare. A constant target of the blacklisting right-wing columnist Walter Winchell, who called him "Borey Pink" and "a disk jerk" in the 1950s, Gray consistently called out those he found mired in hypocrisy and abusive in power. The Winchell feud seemed to haunt him. Years after Winchell had lost influence, Gray still talked darkly on-air about plots and physical attacks Winchell had orchestrated against him. A 1995 biography of Winchell reported that he kept a photograph of a bloodied Gray on his walls.

== Personal life ==
Gray married Beth Serrao on February 14, 1946. The couple had two children. They divorced in 1973. Gray married Judith Margot Morris on September 24, 1973. The marriage ended in divorce. He was married to his third wife, Nancy Kellogg, from 5 September 1986 until his death. They had one child.

On December 21, 1996, Gray died in his sleep at St. Luke’s Hospital in New York City at age 80 from complications of back surgery.

== Awards ==
In 2002, industry publication Talkers Magazine selected Barry Gray as the eighth greatest radio talk show host of all time.
