= Alf Gray (English footballer) =

English footballer

Personal information
- Full name: Alfred Gray
- Date of birth: 13 August 1910
- Place of birth: Westhoughton, Lancashire, England
- Date of death: 1974 (aged 63–64)
- Positions: Wing half; centre half

Senior career*
Years	Team	Apps	(Gls)
–	Daisy Hill		
1931–1932	Oldham Athletic	0	(0)
1932–1933	Torquay United	22	(1)
1933–1934	Liverpool	0	(0)
1934–1936	Lincoln City	32	(0)
1936–19??	Newark Town		
- * Club domestic league appearances and goals

Alfred Gray (13 August 1910 – 1974) was an English footballer who made 54 appearances in the Football League playing for Torquay United and Lincoln City. He played as a wing half or centre half.

== Life and career ==
Gray was born in Westhoughton, Lancashire. He began his career with his local team, Daisy Hill, and was on the books of Oldham Athletic before making his Football League debut in the Third Division South with Torquay United in 1932. By the end of the season, he and full-back Jack Tennant had attracted the attention of First Division Liverpool, whom they joined for an undisclosed but reportedly "very substantial" fee, to include a friendly match. Gray never appeared for Liverpool's first team, and he signed for Lincoln City, newly relegated from the Second Division, in June 1934. He played regularly in his first season with Lincoln, but made only seven appearances in 1935–36, and finished his career in non-league football with Newark Town.

Gray died in 1974.
