= Peter Gray =

Peter Gray may refer to:

- Peter Gray (Australian judge), Australian federal judge
- Peter W. Gray (1819–1874), American lawyer, judge, and legislator from Texas
- Peter Gray (bioengineer) (born 1946), bioengineer in Australia
- Peter Gray (chemist) (1926–2012), professor of physical chemistry at the University of Leeds
- Peter Gray (historian, born 1965), professor of modern Irish history at Queen's University Belfast
- Peter Gray (military historian), military historian at Birmingham University
- Peter Gray (psychologist), American psychologist and author of the introductory psychology textbook, Psychology
- Peter Gray (sailor) (1935–2022), Irish Olympic sailor
- Peter Gray (writer) (1807–1887), Scottish writer
- Peter S. Gray (born 1957), Olympic equestrian for Bermuda and Canada
- Pete Gray (1915–2002), one-armed Major League baseball player
- Pete Gray (activist) (1980–2011), Australian environmental and anti-war activist
- "Peter Gray" (song), American ballad

== See also ==
- The Story of Peter Grey, an Australian television daytime soap opera
