= Allan Gray (footballer) =

Scottish footballer (born 1943)

Personal information
- Full name: Allan Gray
- Date of birth: 12 December 1943 (age 82)
- Place of birth: Scotland
- Position: Centre half

Youth career
- Drumchapel Amateur

Senior career*
Years	Team	Apps	(Gls)
1959–1961	Queen's Park	42	(0)
1961–1964	Clyde	53	(3)

International career
1961	Scotland Amateurs	1	(0)
- * Club domestic league appearances and goals

Allan Gray (born 12 December 1943) was a Scottish amateur footballer who played as a centre half in the Scottish League for Clyde and Queen's Park. He was capped by Scotland at amateur level.
