= Benjamin Kirkman Gray =

English historian of philanthropy and social policy

Benjamin Kirkman Gray (11 August 1862, Blandford, Dorset, UK – 23 June 1907, Letchworth, Hertfordshire, UK) was an economist and author. His book A History of English Philanthropy covers the period from about 1540 to 1800 is considered a noteworthy contribution to this historical subject.

B. Kirkman Gray was educated privately by his father, a Congregationalist minister, and from 1883 to 1886 taught in private schools. To prepare himself for the Congregationalist ministry, he entered In September 1886 New College London. He studied economics and won the Ricardo economic scholarship at University College London. In 1892 Gray went to Leeds to work as a Congregationalist but in 1894 joined the Unitarians. He served from 1894 to 1897 as Unitarian minister at Warwick and from 1898 to 1902 as a Unitarian social worker in London at the Bell Street Mission, Edgware Road. He became more socialist in politics and economics and joined the Independent Labour Party. Because of health problems, he retired from strenuous work and moved to Hampstead to do research on the history of English philanthropic movements. He lectured in 1905 at the London School of Economics on his research.

Gray married in 1898. After his death in 1907 from a heart attack, his widow edited his literary remains.

== Selected publications ==
- A History of English Philanthropy from the Dissolution of the Monasteries to the Taking of the First Census. 1905.
- with Eleanor Kirkman Gray and Elizabeth Leigh Hutchison as editors: Philanthropy and the State, or, Socialist Politics. 1908.
- A Modern Humanist: Miscellaneous Papers of B. Kirkman Gray, edited with a biographical introduction by Henry Bryan Binns, an appreciation by Clementine Black, and a portrait. 1910.
