= Josh Gray =

Josh Gray may refer to:

- Josh Gray (rugby union, born 2001), English rugby union player
- Josh Gray (rugby union, born 1999), New Zealand rugby union player
- Josh Gray (basketball) (born 1993), American basketball player
- Josh Gray (footballer) (born 1991), English football player
- Joshua Gray (born 2000), American gridiron football player
