= Eddie Gray (footballer, born 1934) =

Scottish footballer

Personal information
- Full name: Edward Gray
- Date of birth: 19 October 1934 (age 92)
- Place of birth: Bellshill, Scotland
- Position: Forward

Youth career
- Kirkintilloch Rob Roy

Senior career*
Years	Team	Apps	(Gls)
1955–1957	Hibernian	1	(0)
1955–1956	→ Third Lanark (loan)	9	(4)
1957–1958	Yeovil Town		
1958–1959	Barrow	17	(4)
1959–1960	Accrington Stanley	6	(0)
1960	Stirling Albion	2	(0)
1960–1961	Forfar Athletic	10	(1)
1961–1962	Albion Rovers	9	(1)
Total		54	(10)
- * Club domestic league appearances and goals

Edward "Eddie" Gray (born 19 October 1934 in Bellshill) is a Scottish former professional footballer who played as a forward in the Scottish Football League and the Football League in the 1950s and 1960s.
