= Andrew Gray =

Andrew Gray may refer to:

== Politics ==
- Andrew Gray, 1st Lord Gray (1390–1469), Scottish diplomat and noble
- Andrew Gray (senator) (died 1849), Democratic-Republican member of the Delaware Senate, 1817–1821
- Andrew C. Gray (1804–1885), entrepreneur and Whig delegate to the Delaware Constitutional Convention of 1853
- Andrew Gray (politician) (born ca. 1975), member of the Alaska House of Representatives
- Andrew Wellington Gray, Canadian politician

== Others ==
- Andrew Gray (17th-century divine) (1633–1656), Scottish divine
- Andrew Gray (19th-century divine) (1805–1861), Scottish Presbyterian divine
- Andrew Gray (surveyor) (1820–1862), American surveyor
- Andrew Gray (physicist) (1847–1925), physicist and assistant to Lord Kelvin
- Andrew Gray (anthropologist) (1955–1999), anthropologist and indigenous rights worker
- Andrew Gray (writer) (born 1968), Scottish-born Canadian short story writer and novelist
- Andrew Gray (zoologist) (born 1963), British zoologist, teacher and conservationist
- Andrew Gray, former member of the band Hoots & Hellmouth
- Andrew Sexton Gray (1826–1907), Irish–Australian surgeon and ophthalmologist
- Andrew Gray (lawyer), former UK political candidate

== See also ==
- Andy Gray (disambiguation)
