= James Gray (Scottish footballer) =

Scottish footballer

Personal information
- Full name: James Gray
- Date of birth: 1893
- Place of birth: Dunfermline, Scotland
- Date of death: 24 April 1917 (aged 23–24)
- Place of death: Somme, France
- Position: Inside forward

Senior career*
Years	Team	Apps	(Gls)
1913–1914	Dunfermline Athletic	3	(0)
- * Club domestic league appearances and goals

James Gray (1893 – 24 April 1917) was a Scottish professional footballer who played in the Scottish League for Dunfermline Athletic as an inside forward. He also played cricket for Dunfermline Carnegie.

== Personal life ==
Craig served as a sergeant in the Argyll and Sutherland Highlanders during the First World War and was killed in action in the Somme sector of the Western Front on 24 April 1917. He is commemorated on the Thiepval Memorial.

== Career statistics ==
Appearances and goals by club, season and competition
Club	Season	League			National Cup		Total	
Club	Season	Division	Apps	Goals	Apps	Goals	Apps	Goals
Dunfermline Athletic	1913–14	Scottish Division Two	3	0	0	0	3	0
Career total			3	0	0	0	3	0
