= Tony Gray (comics) =

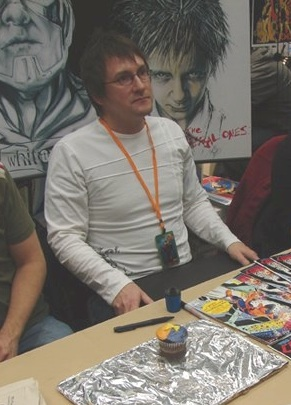
- Gray at the Detroit Fan Fare, September 2010
- Born: Windsor, Ontario
- Areas: Writer, Penciller

Tony Gray is the owner of GlassMonkey Studios Inc. and co-owner of its subsidiary, Legacy Comics Publishing. He is the artist and writer of The Incredible Conduit and white plastic.

Gray is a native of the comic book hotbed of Windsor, Ontario, Canada which has produced an unusual number of comic book creators/artists including Darwyn Cooke, David Finch, Jeff Lemire, and Jason Fabok. Gray occasionally appears at comic events with friends/associates and also Windsor area natives, Jason Fabok (artist: justice League of America) and David Finch (artist/writer: Batman, The Dark Knight).

In late 2015, Gray announced several new comic book properties he'll be illustrating with actor/comedian, Kenny Hotz (Kenny vs. Spenny, Triumph of the Will, South Park). 'Lou and Blue' is their first collaboration. The two of them have become a popular, yet one of the most unlikely pairings on the comic book convention circuit. After many delays, their comic, Hotz Comicz, which includes two features written by Hotz and illustrated by Gray was finally scheduled for release in December 2023.

Gray has since refocused on his Conduit feature with new material scheduled for release in Spring 2024. In a counter effort to the growing AI trend, 'GlassMonkey Studios' is rebranding as 'Unsocial Media' and Gray has been quoted as saying that he will be producing his comics entirely by traditionally illustrating, coloring, and lettering by hand.

Since 2022, Gray has announced he will no longer be doing convention appearances.

== Career ==
=== Syndicated Comic Strips ===
Gray began his professional career in comics in December 2000 as the writer and creator of Saturday Afternoon, a syndicated daily comic strip. The strip featured, Baldoon, an eight-year-old boy who sought relief from his mundane days through adventures in an imaginary world inside a framed photograph. The strip also featured the characters Revello, the Clown, Pixie, and Pin. The quirky strip is still in production and has developed a niche following. Buoyed by the success of Saturday Afternoon, Gray created a second feature called Mick & Me in March 2007. The comic featured a younger version of the author and his brother, Mick. The feature was realistically rendered and proved difficult to reproduce in the limited spaces allotted to daily newspaper comics. Mick & Me never found wide syndication and ceased being produced in 2009.

=== The Incredible Conduit ===
In August 2009, Gray launched what was to become his most popular feature to date, The Incredible Conduit. Originally created as a daily newspaper strip for the CanWest chain of papers in Canada, The Incredible Conduit features the adventures of Raymond Cole, a university student who developed the ability to absorb then project all forms of energy. The Incredible Conduit also features Maria Pasqua, an engineering genius who developed The Conduit's suit to assist him in controlling his newfound powers. The primary drive for The Conduit and Maria is to find their lab partner who has been missing since the blast that gave Raymond his conduit-like powers. The feature was contracted out to Legacy Comics Publishing in 2010 to be published in comic book format.

In July 2015, Tony Gray contracted actor, Rob Archer (6' 6", 285 lbs), as a 'comic actor; to portray The Conduit in the comic books and at live appearances and signings. Archer has appeared in feature films such as 'Kick Ass 2', Pixels' and 'A Christmas Horror Story'. He has appeared in many television series including regular roles in 'Lost Girl' and 'Defiance'.

=== Legacy Comics ===
In January 2011, Gray purchased 50% ownership of Legacy Comics and now co-owns the comic book publishing company with Justin Walsh. Legacy Comics Publishing is a subsidiary of GlassMonkey Studios Inc. and handles the commercial, educational and promotional line of comics. These comics often feature characters licensed through GlassMonkey Studios Inc.

=== Glassmonkey Studios Inc. ===
In 2011, Tony Gray partnered with colleague David Finch to incorporate Glassmonkey Studios. Gray and Finch along with musician, Andrew Barlow (formerly of the Doomsday Dogs), and sound engineer, Scott Barlow founded the company to provide a "start to finish" facility for their various independent illustration, animation and film ventures. Interviews with Gray indicate an interest in producing an animated version of his popular comic book series, The Incredible Conduit. After re-signing to a second exclusive contract with DC Comics, David Finch sold his shares in GlassMonkey Studios to Gray. In 2013, GlassMonkey Studios expanded their line of comic book publications to include, Tales of the Incredible Conduit, Apes in the Woods, and Improbabilia.

In 2015 GlassMonkey Studios began work on a new comic book series called, 'Lou & Blue', which feature an art thief and the Blue Boy as characters who engage in adventures within famous paintings. The comic feature is based upon an original script by, Kenny Hotz. Kenny Hotz is best known for his work as an actor in 'Kenny vs. Spenny' and 'Triumph of the Will'. Hotz is also the creator of the television series 'Testees' and has written for 'South Park'.
