= Reubin Clein =

Reubin Jackson Clein, Sr. (December 28, 1905 – September 9, 1989) was editor and publisher of Miami Beach scandal sheet "Miami Life" from 1923–1965.

== Miami Life ==
A precursor to tabloids such as the National Enquirer, Clein won the Miami Life weekly in a poker game in 1923. Clein was a prize fighter who moved from southern Georgia in the early 1920s, started up the press of the defunct paper and wrote most of the editorial content for the next 40 years. "Miami Life" paralleled the growing pains and triumph of Miami from its infant days as a pioneering backwater to the glory days of its glittering allure as an international hotspot.

In an article in the Miami Herald magazine "Tropic" written by now New York Daily News editor Jay Maeder, titled "Rag Times," "Miami Life" is described as "monstrous, it was leprous, it was beyond obscenity. Some of it just happened to be the stone unforgiving truth." In describing Clein he wrote "Jailings never stopped him, street-corner pummelings never stopped him, a blast of dynamite didn't stop him..." He further explains, "Reubin's "Miami Life" was a plain-speaking, four-page broadsheet, one that assumed its readers weren't fools and knew full well that the woods were full of thieves and nitwits."

His printing plant was blown up twice and his house once, in 1965, which is when he closed his paper, as described in the Tropic, "The fires came and they avenged, wrathful fires that cleansed and purged and howled like angels. Ruebin Clein, beaten, kicked dolefully through the smoking crucible of what had been his home as the investigators did their work. Torched the investigators agreed. Who, they wondered, could have done this thing?

"Ruebin Clein laughed shortly, waved a hand at his burned-up newspaper: the collected works, the blackened roasted books, charred remains of yesterday's news, shrieking in the night, breathing plumes of poison; "take your pick," he said, "take your pick."

"People have the wrong idea of my father," says his daughter, Marilyn Lois Shaktman. He wasn't a hater and his word was his bond...if he gave you his word, you could confess murder and no one would ever know it."

"You should see the people who would come to our house and tell him things. He was honorable. If you give your word and you don't tell anyone, where is that wrong?"

Clein broke Miami Beach Mayor Mel Richard's nose at a political rally and beat up a handful of his supporters. When brought before the judge, the judge looked at the many bruised and bloodied men and asked who had done this. The elderly Clein stood up without a scratch. The judge shook his head and said that the beaten men should be ashamed of themselves and told the unscathed Clein to get out of there.

He was the first Florida journalist to go to jail for not revealing a source in 1950, and his case sits along other groundbreaking first amendment right cases in legal archives.
