= Naomi Gray =

American first female Vice President of Planned Parenthood

Naomi Jean Thomas Gray
- Born: 18 May 1922; Hattiesburg, Mississippi
- Died: 29 December 2006 (aged 84); San Francisco, California
- Burial place: Crown Hill Cemetery and Arboretum, Section Community Mausoleum, Lot CC-A-2-V, Indianapolis, Indiana; 39.8274766°N 86.1730061°W
- Known for: Public Health organizing
- Honours: Indiana Distinguished Citizen

Naomi Jean Thomas Gray (18 May 1922 - 29 December 2006) was the first female Vice President of Planned Parenthood and the first female social work instructor at San Francisco State University. She created several organizations in the field of public health, and was appointed to the San Francisco Health Commission in 1985. She was also honored as an Indiana Distinguished Citizen.

== Early life and education ==
Naomi Gray was born Naomi Jean Thomas in Hattiesburg, Mississippi. She was raised in Indiana along with her four siblings. She graduated from Crispus Attucks High School.

In 1945 Gray earned her bachelor's degree in Sociology from Hampton Institute. She later received her Master of Social Work from Indiana University School of Social Work at Indiana University Indianapolis.

== Career ==
Upon graduation, Gray became a caseworker for a foster care agency in Indianapolis. She was honored as an Indiana Distinguished Citizen. Soon after, she began working for the Planned Parenthood Federation of America. During her 20 years on the job she earned the position of Vice President, making her the first Black female to hold the position at the organization. She later moved to San Francisco and served on the city's Public Health Department. She co-created and developed many public health programs.

=== Planned Parenthood ===
Gray joined the Planned Parenthood Federation of America in 1952. She was the first Black female Vice president to work for Planned Parenthood. During her leadership, she established and directed seven regional office and developed community education and organizational program guidelines.

=== Public health ===
Gray moved to San Francisco to live with her sister, Doris Thomas. She worked as a social worker and then as a professor at San Francisco State University.

She was appointed to serve on the first San Francisco Health Commission in 1985 by Dianne Feinstein. She used the position to move toward "stronger affirmative action programs" in the city's Public Health Department. She stayed on the Commission two terms. Feinstein also nominated Gray for the "Who's Who of strong black women".

In her public health positions, she fought against needle exchange programs, where IV drug users could exchange used syringes for new ones in hope of preventing the spread of diseases, particularly HIV. In her words: "A lot of us in the minority community feel this only reinforces drug abuse among black, Hispanic and poor people... It's like saying the way to deal with welfare mothers is to have them sterilized."

Gray hoped to find other ways to prevent AIDS in Black communities and jumpstarted the Black Coalition On AIDS. As one of the founding members of the coalition stated: "[Commissioner Gray] had seen spiraling funding for AIDS education and activities directed toward the black population. Her invitation was a challenge to the black community to define and advocate for our own needs. Out of that challenge we have created a broadly based organization including over 200 individuals and agencies committed to the education and service needs of our community."

In 1993, in opposition to the desegregation project of the San Francisco Unified School District she cofounded the Twenty-First Century Academy in Bayview-Hunters Point, a public middle school created to "improve learning among underserved African Americans." She hoped it would stop the busing efforts, which brought Black students into white-neighborhood schools.

She made efforts to ensure Black foster children were placed with Black foster parents, and also participated in projects that supported stronger Affirmative Action programs in the Public Health Department.

She also co-created the Urban Institute for American Affairs, Black Leadership Forum, the African American Education Leadership Group, and the Sojourner Truth Foster Family Service Agency and served on Mayor Willie Brown’s task force on Children, Youth and Their Families from 1990 to 1993, and she was a member of Mayor Gavin Newsom’s transition team in 2003.

As president of the Urban Institute for American Affairs, Gray was awarded the prestige of Indiana Distinguished Citizen and was referenced by the National Association for Sickle Cell Disease.

Later, she founded Naomi Gray Associates, a public relations and consulting organization.

She was close friends with prominent leaders of San Francisco, such as Dianne Feinstein and Nancy Pelosi.

== Death ==
Naomi Gray died on December 29, in San Francisco. Her memorial service was held at the town hall on January 20, 2007.
