= American Broadcasting Station in Europe =

Coordinates: 51°30′52.93″N 0°8′4.61″W

The American Broadcasting Station in Europe (ABSIE) was a radio broadcasting station set up by the U.S. Office of War Information (OWI) in collaboration with the British BBC to counter Nazi propaganda.

It started broadcasting on 30 April 1944, two months before D Day with the words "This is the American Broadcasting Station in Europe... In this historic year, 1944, the allied radio will bring you tremendous news...". The radio station informed the people of occupied Europe about their intended liberation and gave hints about the D Day and the Russian invasion from the north. The radio station was located in a converted film building under the Gaumont-British offices in London's Wardour Street and continued broadcasting till 4 July 1945. It used to broadcast in the 9520, 9550, 9625 and 9640 kHz range and identified itself every 15 mins to its listeners. Along with broadcasts intended for European listeners, it also aired musical and other programs mixed with what were hoped to be demoralizing messages for the German Forces. Bing Crosby and Dinah Shore were among the leading performers in ABSIE programs.
