= Kevin Gray (legal scholar) =

Kevin John Gray, FBA (born 1951) is a British legal scholar. He was professor of law at the University of Cambridge from 1993 to 2011 and has been a fellow of Trinity College, Cambridge since 1993.

== Life ==
Born in 1951, Gray completed his undergraduate and doctoral degrees at the University of Cambridge.

From 1975 to 1981, Gray was a fellow of Queens' College, Cambridge, and was then a fellow of Trinity College, Cambridge from 1980 to 1990, during which time he was a lecturer in law at Cambridge (1978–90). He was then Drapers' Professor of Law at the University of London from 1991 to 1993, and then was jointly professor of law at the University of Cambridge and a professorial fellow at Trinity College, Cambridge from 1993 to 2011, when he retired; in 2011, he became a life fellow of Trinity, and remains an emeritus professor at Cambridge as of 2026. He was called to the bar at the Middle Temple in 1993, and has been a bencher there since 2014.

In 1999, Gray was elected a fellow of the British Academy, the United Kingdom's national academy for the humanities and social sciences.

== Publications ==
- Gray, Kevin J., Reallocation of Property on Divorce (Abingdon: Professional Books, 1977)
- Gray, Kevin J., and D. S. Pearl, Social Welfare Law (London: Croom Helm, 1981)
- Gray, Kevin J., and C. C. Turpin, Property, Divorce and Retirement Pension Rights, Cambridge-Tilburg Law Lectures 1982 (Deventer: Kluwer Law Publishers, 1986)
- Elements of Land Law:
  - 1st ed. (London: Butterworths, 1987)
  - 2nd ed. (London: Butterworths, 1993)
  - 3rd ed. (with S. F. Gray; London: Butterworths, 2000)
  - 4th ed. (with S. F. Gray; Oxford: Oxford University Press, 2004)
  - 5th ed. (with S. F. Gray; Oxford: Oxford University Press, 2009)
- Land Law:
  - 1st ed. (with S. F. Gray; London: Butterworths, 1999)
  - 2nd ed. (with S. F. Gray; London: Butterworths, 2001)
  - 3rd ed. (with S. F. Gray; London: LexisNexis, 2003)
  - 4th ed. (with S. F. Gray; Oxford: Oxford University Press, 2006)
  - 5th ed. (with S. F. Gray; Oxford: Oxford University Press, 2007)
  - 6th ed. (with S. F. Gray; Oxford: Oxford University Press, 2009)
  - 7th ed. (with S. F. Gray; Oxford: Oxford University Press, 2011)
