= Kevin Gray (visual artist) =

German visual artist

Kevin Gray is a German visual artist, mostly known for his fine art gallery work. He often employs mixed media in his art, combining a variety of media such as oil, spray paint and collaging. His work often depicts ambiguous imagery with recurring themes of deserted architectural structures, poppy fields, islands and stairs.

== Studies ==
Kevin Gray was born in 1982 in Bremen, Germany. He studied fine arts and painting at The Berlin Weissensee School of Art, where he studied with the internationally acclaimed artist Katharina Grosse.

In 2009, he graduated with the distinction and honour of a Meisterschüler, a title and program rewarded to the best students in the German arts education system.

== Work ==
Working with oil, spray paint and collage techniques, Kevin Gray's work often features indistinct light-sources as well as recurring motifs of bridges, decaying trees, islands, poppies, stairs, abandoned structures and buildings tagged with graffiti.

There is often a hazy fog that is present in many of Kevin Gray's paintings, reinforcing the painter's mysterious and ambiguous artistic aesthetic. The artist's colour palette gives prominence to muted tones with occasional bright colourful accents such as the red in his poppy field paintings and the indistinct light-sources featured in many of his paintings.

Some of the major themes present through Kevin Gray's work include drug production, social alienation and the destruction of nature. The poppy field paintings, while at first glance seem to be innocent depictions of flower meadows, actually highlight underlying themes of danger and threat through the cut poppy seed pods, key to the production of opium and heroin.

== Exhibitions ==
Kevin has exhibited extensively in Berlin including in the 2016 solo show Zeitnebel at the Kunstundhelden gallery, Parallele Welten in 2015 at gallery Zulauf in Freinsheim. Gallery Zulauf also presented Kevin Gray at the ArtKarlsruhe Fair in 2014. Kevin Gray's work has also been exhibited in cities such as Istanbul and Beijing.
