= Andy Gray =

Andy Gray may refer to:

- Andy Gray (actor) (1959–2021), Scottish comedy actor
- Andy Gray (musician) (born 1970), composed the Big Brother UK TV theme (with Paul Oakenfold)

== Sports ==
- Andy Gray (cricketer) (born 1974), former Yorkshire and Derbyshire cricketer
- Andy Gray (footballer, born 1955), Scottish footballer, commentator, and beIN Sports pundit
- Andy Gray (footballer, born 1964), English footballer and former coach of the Sierra Leone national team
- Andy Gray (footballer, born 1973), English footballer who played for Reading and Leyton Orient
- Andy Gray (footballer, born 1977), Scottish footballer who played for clubs including Leeds United, Nottingham Forest, Barnsley and Bradford City

== See also ==
- Andrew Gray (disambiguation)
