= Alexander Gray =

Alexander or Alex Gray may refer to:

- Alexander Gray (North Carolina politician) (1768–1864), American merchant and state legislator
- Alexander Gray (lawyer) (1860–1933), New Zealand King's Counsel
- Alexander Gray (poet) (1882–1968), Scottish poet
- Alexander Gray (actor), (1891-1976), American film actor
- Alexander Gray (RAF officer) (1896–1980), Royal Air Force leader during World War II
- Alexander T. Gray, fourth Secretary of State of Wisconsin
- Alex Gray (author) (born 1950), Scottish author
- Alex Gray (ice hockey) (1898–1986), Canadian ice hockey player
- Alex Gray (safety), American football safety for Edmonton Eskimos
- Alex Gray (sportsman, born 1991), rugby union and American football player

== See also ==
- Alex Grey (born 1953), U.S. artist
