= Joseph Gray =

Joseph Gray may refer to:

- Joe Gray (actor) (1912–1971), American boxer, actor, and stuntman
- Joe Gray (American football) (1915–1999), American football player
- Joseph Gray (bishop) (1919–1999), Roman Catholic bishop of Shrewsbury
- Joseph Gray (burgess) (before 1715 – 1769), planter and politician in Colonial Virginia
- Joseph Gray (painter) (1890–1963), British painter
- Joseph Gray (police officer), convicted of second-degree manslaughter for drunk driving
- Joseph Gray (runner) (born 1984), American runner
- Joseph Anthony Gray (1884–1966), U.S. Representative from Pennsylvania
- Joseph M. M. Gray (1877–1957), Methodist minister and Chancellor of American University
- Joe Gray (rugby union) (born 1988), English rugby union player

== See also ==
- Joe Grey (born 2003), English footballer
