= Bernard Gray (Sunday Pictorial journalist) =

British WWII journalist (died 1942)

Bernard Gray (last seen 27 April 1942) was a British journalist. He reported for the Sunday Pictorial from the 1940 German invasion of Belgium and the British retreat to Dunkirk. Posted to Malta, Gray reported on the siege of the island by Axis forces. He was keen to cover the North African campaign and secured unofficial passage aboard the Royal Navy submarine HMS Urge, which sank off Malta shortly afterwards with the loss of all on board.

== Life and career ==
Gray was a journalist for the Sunday Pictorial during the 1930s and published a biography of Winston Churchill around 1939. During the 1940 German invasion of Belgium, which began on 10 May, Gray raced to the Belgian capital, Brussels. He reached it on 15 May 1940, days before it was captured, alongside Kim Philby, then reporting for The Times. Gray recorded refugees fleeing the city in the final days before its capture.

Gray accompanied the British Army on their retreat to Dunkirk and was probably the last reporter to leave the town before its capture by the German forces. He reported the evacuation of the British Expeditionary Force as one of the most glorious episodes in British history and as showing "the British Empire at its mightiest – in defeat." Gray and Philby returned to France on 11 June, arriving via Cherbourg to witness the evacuation of the last survivors of the 51st (Highland) Division, which was largely captured. He travelled to Le Mans and Rouen before returning to Britain via St Malo and Holyhead. For his frequent travels by sea Gray became known as "Potato Jones", after a British merchant navy captain who had run supplies to the Republicans during the Spanish Civil War.

During the Blitz bombings of London, Gray and a friend went undercover as a couple to investigate reports that the city's luxury hotels were excluding working-class people from their bomb shelters. Gray reported this was the case, though he noted that the hotels, which included Claridge's, the Berkeley and the Ritz, had no legal obligation to admit non-residents.

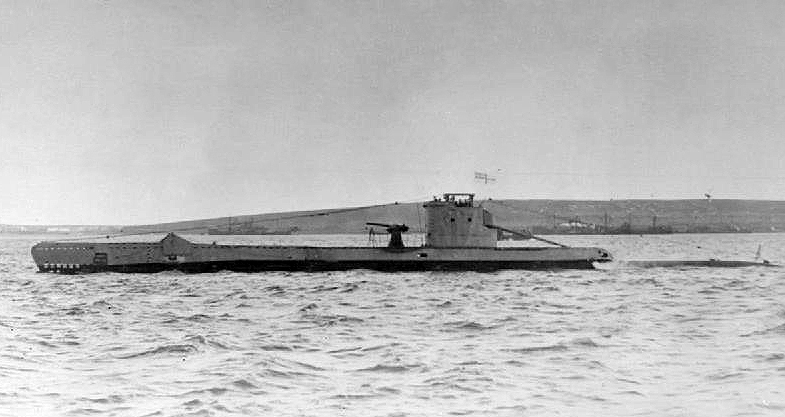
HMS Urge

Gray reported for the Sunday Pictorial and the Sydney Daily Mirror from the British Mediterranean island of Malta during its two-year siege by Axis forces. He wanted to cover the North African campaign and lobbied friends—possibly including Lord Gort, the newly appointed governor of Malta, who had also commanded the army at Dunkirk—for passage to Egypt. Gray was successful in securing passage on HMS Urge, a Royal Navy submarine bound for Alexandria. The Royal Navy forbade the carrying of any civilians on submarines so Gray was present as an unofficial passenger. Before embarking he wrote to his wife, "I'm going away now on a trip which is dangerous. It's the last thing of its kind I shall ever do. I'm doing this for the children". Urge left Malta on 27 April but failed to reach Egypt. Her wreckage was discovered in 2019 near to Malta; she likely struck a naval mine and sank with the loss of Gray and the 43 crew on board.

Because Gray's presence aboard Urge was unofficial he was initially recorded by the Royal Navy only as having gone missing after travelling to Egypt by an undisclosed submarine. His fate as a passenger on the vessel was only officially recorded in 2003 following an inquiry at the Royal Navy Submarine Museum in Gosport, Hampshire, and he was then added to the museum's record of submariner casualties. Gray is the only known unofficial passenger on a British Second World War submarine and the only journalist to die aboard a submarine in the war.
