= Lee Gray =

Lee Gray (born Royce Lee Darling on March 15, 1936, in Oklahoma City, Oklahoma - died March 8, 1996) was a rock and roll American disc-jockey in the New York area then moving to Cleveland.

== Early life ==
Shortly after he was born, his parents, Jack and Alma Darling, divorced and his mother moved to Chicago. Lee spent the majority of his childhood traveling back and forth from Oklahoma City to Chicago, on his own, to spend time with each parent. He also spent a lot of time with his grandmother on the Cherokee Indian Reservation when visits were inconvenient for his parents. This schedule caused him to attend many schools before graduating High School in 1953.

== Army ==
After graduating high school, Lee joined the U.S. Army in 1953, one month before the official end of the Korean War. While in the U.S. Army, he was stationed in Kaiserslautern, Germany, as a Military Policeman. He had a passion for singing, but was told that he didn't have a good singing voice, so he considered getting into radio. Lee requested, and was granted, to work at the A.F.N (Armed Forces Radio Network). Thirty seconds before his first air shift, his supervisor whispered in his ear "When the clock gets to the top of the hour, try to relax and not think about the 50 million Europeans that will be listening to your voice and every word you say." He really became flustered and botched the entire broadcast while his supervisor was laughing at the radio rookie.

== Career ==
When his tour of duty was finished, Lee decided to give radio a try as a career in the U.S., and was hired at WKRG in Mobile, Alabama. Two years later, he moved up to WOKY in Milwaukee, Wisconsin, in 1962. While in Milwaukee, he met one of his longtime friends Terrell Metheny (a.k.a. Mitch Michael), and began to use the radio name Lee Gray. Lee and Terrell formed a strong friendship and continued to keep in contact for the next 35 years.

He accepted a position down the road at legendary WIND (AM) in Chicago, and then on to WTRY (AM) in Albany/Troy, New York, where Lee also became known on the air as "Beatle Buddy Lee Gray".

1964 was the start of the Beatle Invasion, and New York was the perfect place to be. Lee made connections with The Beatles during the short time he was at another Albany station, WABY, and continuing as Beatle Buddy Lee Gray while traveling to England several times on station promotions. This "Beatle Buddy" status elevated his career to a national level as he was featured in magazines and made an appearances on an all Beatles episode of American Bandstand.

While in Albany–Troy, New York, Lee obtained the private pilot's license that he longed for since his days with the Armed Forces Radio Network. He later received his Instrument Flight Rating, Helicopter License and more. Lee used his license at many of the radio stations he worked at by flying listeners across the country for promotions and Beatles concerts.

Lee arranged to have the area's top psychedelic band, The Shandels, open for The Lovin' Spoonful and The Byrds. After the Byrds concert, he arranged for the band to record "Charity" on the Laurie label in 1966 under the name The Gray Things. "Charity" was a successful advance release which received a very favorable review in Billboard Magazine. "Charity" can be played via the official Lee Gray web site by clicking WTRY on the home page, then scrolling to under a picture of Lee and John Lennon, where the Laurie label appears. "Charity" and other American Garage Rock is very popular in Europe, and the song is still being played by many online stations around the world. "Charity" appears on multiple compilation albums including Mindrocker, a 13-CD "Anthology of 60s US-Punk Garage Psych", which was originally released in Germany in 1982. It was subsequently re-issued in England during 2002 in a 1 to 1,000 numbered collector's series. "Charity" is also included in Psychedelic Unknowns, Volume 5 among others. Lee was the top radio personality in the Albany/Troy area, and The Gray Things success is a testament to the impact Lee had in this market.

The psychedelic movement was in full swing, and Lee Gray moved back to the midwest to work for WHK in Cleveland, Ohio, in 1967, and then to Louisville, Kentucky, at WKLO, where he met another one of his longtime friends, Carl Wiglesworth. While in Louisville, Lee received a letter from Terrell Metheny, who was now the Program Director of WMCA in New York City. Terrell offered Lee a job replacing Gary Stevens, so Lee headed to the largest radio market in the country.

He moved back to WKLO in Louisville, where he met his wife, Mary, of 24 years. Lee and Mary had a son, David, in 1972 and Michael in 1974. Throughout the 70s and 80s there was more moving around, which is typical for broadcasters. Lee worked for stations in Arkansas, New York, Texas and Illinois, just to name a few.

On December 17, 1995, in Houston, Lee suffered a heart attack and had to have a triple bypass surgery. The years of a radio disc jockey, especially in the 1960s and 70s, did a lot of harm to his heart. After a successful operation and a slow recovery, Lee went back on the air two months later, on February 19, 1996. He was on the air for three more weeks before suffering another heart attack on the way to his doctor's appointment; this time it was fatal. Lee Gray died on March 8, 1996, at the age of 59.
