= Alan Gray (footballer) =

English footballer

Personal information
- Date of birth: 2 May 1974 (age 52)
- Place of birth: Carlisle, England
- Position: Defender

Senior career*
Years	Team	Apps	(Gls)
1992–1993	Carlisle United		
1993–1997	Doncaster Rovers	2	(0)
1996–1997	Bishop Auckland		
1997	Darlington	6	(0)
1998	Carlisle United	1	(0)
1998–2001	Workington	120	
2001–2003	Queen of the South	45	(1)
2003–2008	Workington	278	
2008-2013	Penrith		
Total		452	(1)
- * Club domestic league appearances and goals

Alan Gray (born 2 May 1974) is an English former professional footballer and highly regarded youth coach, who played for Doncaster Rovers, Darlington and Carlisle United in the Football League and Queen of the South in the Scottish Football League.

Coaching career

Alan forged a formidable coaching partnership with Stuart Woodward at stanwix warriors. His coaching style places a strong emphasis on defence and hard work. Training sessions would often open up with a classic Rondo before smaller box areas marked out with cones, often incorporating drills where ‘scanning’ for opponents is required.

.
