= Elizabeth Gray (Irish artist) =

Irish artist, photographer (1837–1903)

- Born: Elizabeth Sharpe; 1837; Dublin, Ireland
- Died: 29 April 1903 (aged 65–66); Victoria, Australia
- Known for: etching and watercolour painting

Elizabeth Gray (née Sharpe) (1837 – 29 April 1903) was an Irish artist, etcher, and amateur photographer.

== Life ==
Elizabeth Sharpe was born in Dublin in 1837 to a distinguished family. Her brother was Richard Sharpe RHA, inventor of the chromograph. Elizabeth was living in Sydney by early 1857. She married Charles Gray on 19 March 1857 in Portland, Victoria. The couple lived at their property at Nareeb Nareeb, near Portland. They had at least three daughters, with the eldest Annie was born on 14 April 1858. Gray died on 29 April 1903.

== Artistic work ==
Gray worked in watercolour and pen-and-ink, with some of her early work in Australia consists of two watercolours of Sydney Town and Harbour, and Sydney Heads from 1857. Gray continued to work artistically after her marriage. Her work in pen and ink was on a variety of surfaces, including eggs. Her work View of Ferntree Gully from 19 February 1860 is on porcelain. She contributed five works to the fourth Annual Exhibition of Fine Arts in Melbourne in 1864. The pieces were four landscapes and one rural scene. Along with her husband, Gray exhibited at the 1866 Melbourne Intercolonial Exhibition, exhibited watercolours of Schnapper Point and Queenscliff, and two etchings called The Bluff and Beech Trees. Her doilies or "etchings on linen, done with marking ink and a quill pen", won a medal.

Gray presented two vases made from black swan eggs, etched with "some sketches of natural history", to the Duke of Edinburgh in 1867 during his visit to Victoria. For these she received a royal commission, and they were displayed at the 1872 Exhibition at the South Kensington Museum. Prince Alfred requested that she make a second pair for Queen Victoria, Gray made another pair mounted in silver. Two pen-and-ink drawings by Gray were displayed at the Victorian Intercolonial Exhibition preceding the 1873 London International, along with the vases. The pair of eggs belonging to the Prince were sold, with the Queen's are still held at Osborne House, Isle of Wight. Another surviving example of Gray's work is an etched opaline panel showing a fern gully. She also appears to have exhibited photographs of Aborigines at the 1888 Melbourne Centennial International Exhibition.
