= Charlotte Gray =

Charlotte Gray may refer to:

- Charlotte Gray (author) (born 1948), Canadian historian and author
- Charlotte A. Gray (1844–1912), English educator and temperance leader
- Charlotte E. Gray (1873–1926), American author
- Charlotte Gray (novel), a 1999 novel by Sebastian Faulks
  - Charlotte Gray (film), a 2001 film based on the novel
