= Paul Gray =

Paul Gray may refer to:

- Paul Gray (American musician) (1972–2010), bassist of heavy metal band Slipknot
- Paul Gray (civil servant) (born 1948), former chairman of HM Revenue & Customs, a British government department
- Paul Gray (English musician) (born 1958), bassist of the Damned
- Paul Gray (hurdler) (born 1969), British hurdler
- Paul Gray (footballer) (born 1970), Northern Irish former footballer
- Paul Gray (information technology) (1930–2012), pioneer in the IT field
- Paul Gray (skier) (born 1969), Australian Olympic skier
- Paul Gray (songwriter) (1963–2018), Australian singer, songwriter, record producer, frontman for the pop band Wa Wa Nee
- Paul E. Gray (1932–2017), president of MIT

== See also ==
- Sir Paul Grey, British diplomat
