= Gary Gray =

Gary Gray may refer to:

- Gary Gray (actor) (1936–2006), American child actor in the 1940s
- Gary Gray (baseball) (born 1952), former Major League Baseball first baseman
- Gary Gray (basketball) (born 1945), former NBA guard
- Gary Gray (footballer) (born 1953), Australian rules footballer
- Gary Gray (politician) (born 1958), British-born Australian member of parliament
- Gary Gray (recording engineer), Canadian recording engineer
- Gary LeRoi Gray (born 1986), American actor and voice actor
- F. Gary Gray (born 1969), American film and music video director
