= Adeline Gray (parachutist) =

American parachutist

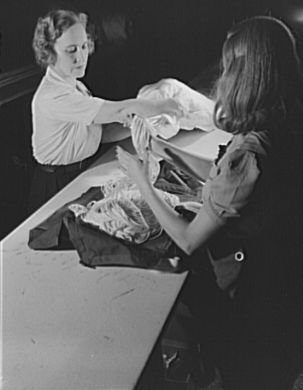
Gray rigging a parachute in August 1942

Adeline Gray, married names Johnson and Graf, (1915/16 – September 27, 1975) was an early American parachutist. She is thought to have been one of the only female parachutists in the United States before the 1940s. Gray received her parachuting license at the age of 19 and afterwards appeared as part of a stunt parachuting team in barnstorming shows. She was also a licensed pilot by 21. Gray later worked as a parachute rigger and tester for DuPont and on June 6, 1942, became the first person to jump with a nylon parachute. Gray became moderately famous for this and appeared in advertisements for Camel cigarettes.

== Parachutist ==
Adeline Gray was born in 1915 or 1916 and grew up in Oxford, Connecticut. She developed an interest in parachuting as a child and jumped from her hayloft using an umbrella, though she later noted "I ruined many umbrellas". Gray began making parachute jumps in 1935, at the age of 19, and became the first licensed female parachutist in Connecticut. In the inter-war years she appeared in barnstorming shows as part of a stunt parachuting team and, from 1938, operated a parachute training school in Lancaster, Pennsylvania. Gray also became a licensed aircraft pilot at the age of 21.

Parachutes were traditionally made from silk but World War II led to a shortage of this material as most was imported from Japan. The DuPont company were manufacturers of nylon and sought to use this man-made material to produce parachutes. DuPont teamed up with the Pioneer Parachute Company and Cheney Brothers silkmakers to develop a nylon parachute. Gray was employed by DuPont as a parachute rigger and tester with responsibility for checking parachutes for flaws before folding them into their packs. She volunteered to test the first nylon parachute, which DuPont agreed to.

On June 6, 1942, she became the first person to jump wearing a nylon parachute, doing so from 2,500 feet (760 m) at Brainard Field, Connecticut. Media reports from the time remarked on Gray's calm demeanor before the test, which was her 33rd parachute jump. The jump was broadcast live on Hartford radio station WTIC.

The test was witnessed by 50 senior military officials and led to the widescale use of nylon for parachutes. Some 90% of DuPont's nylon production had originally been used to manufacture stockings but, after the test, almost all of it was dedicated to military purposes, principally parachutes and reinforcement for tires. The Pioneer Parachute Company became the world's largest manufacturer of nylon parachutes, at one stage of the war employing 3,000 people and producing 300 parachutes a day.

== Later life ==
The test brought Gray national attention and she entered into an advertising contract with the R. J. Reynolds Tobacco Company for Camel cigarettes. She appeared often in print advertisements, including one wearing a ballgown. Gray continued to work at Pioneer and married inventor Kenneth Johnson. In 1947 her husband allocated her 50% ownership of a patent for an electrically triggered explosive parachute release mechanism. Gray later married again, to August Graf. She had a son, Glenn Johnson, and two daughters, Keni Cummings and Joyce Harrington. Gray died in Naugatuck, Connecticut on September 27, 1975, at the age of 59. Her death followed a brief period of illness.
