= Charles Gray (songwriter) =

Scottish songwriter

- Born: 10 March 1782; Anstruther, Fife, Scotland
- Died: 13 April 1851 (aged 69)
- Occupation: Songwriter
- Years active: 1810s–1850s

Charles Gray (10 March 1782 – 13 April 1851) was a Scottish captain in the Royal Marines, known as a songwriter.

== Life ==
Gray was born at Anstruther, Fife, on 10 March 1782. His education and early training fitted him for the sea, and in 1805, through the influence of a maternal uncle, he received a commission in the Woolwich division of the Royal Marines. He was thirty-six years in the service and retired on a captain's full pay in 1841. He spent the remainder of his days in Edinburgh. His associates included Robert Chambers, Patrick Maxwell, and David Vedder.

== Works ==
Gray published Poems and Songs in 1811, which went into a second edition at the end of three years. In 1813, on a visit to Anstruther, he had joined in the formation of the Anstruther Musomanik Society through which, in the four years of its existence, members contributed to Scottish song.

During his naval career, Gray had practised lyric composition, and when he retired in 1841, he published his second volume, Lays and Lyrics. Several of these poems were set to music by Peter M'Leod, and in one of them—"When Autumn Has Laid Her Sickle By"—he makes almost the only pointed allusion to his life at sea. He contributed to John Muir Wood's Songs of Scotland, and Whistle Binkie.

Besides his original verse, Gray wrote some criticism. Around 1845, he contributed to the Glasgow Citizen some "Notes on Scottish Song", which include passages on Robert Burns.

== Family ==
Gray married early, his wife, Jessie Carstairs, being sister of the Rev. Dr. Carstairs, of Anstruther. She and one of her two sons predeceased Gray, at whose death was on 13 April 1851; the remaining son was a lieutenant in the Royal Marines.
