= Kevin Francis Gray =

- Born: 1972 (age 53–54); Armagh, Northern Ireland.

Kevin Francis Gray (born 1972) is an Irish artist living and working in Canterbury and Pietrasanta, Italy. Hedi Slimane and Howard Bilton are both collectors of his work.

Gray was born in Armagh, Northern Ireland. He studied at the National College Of Art and Design, Dublin (1995), the School of Art Institute, Chicago (1996), and he completed his MA in Fine Art at Goldsmiths, London (1999).

Gray is a figurative sculptor, who works predominantly with bronze and marble. His work has been shown in London, São Paulo, New York, Berlin, and Rome. He is currently represented by Pace Gallery, London.

== Solo exhibitions ==
2017

- Pace Gallery, New York, NY, USA

2013

- Pace Gallery. London, UK

2012

- Haunch of Venison, New York, NY, USA

2011

- Mendes Wood Gallery, São Paulo, Brazil

2010

- Changing Role/Move Over Gallery, Rome, Italy

2009

- Personal, curated by Martina Cavallarin; Changing Role/Move Over Gallery at Palazzo San Pasquale, Venice, Italy

2007

- Goff+Rosenthal, Berlin, Germany

2006

- Ringsend, Changing Role/Move Over Gallery, Naples, Italy

2005

- Roebling Hall, New York, NY, USA
- One in the Other, London, UK

2003

- Changing Role/Move Over Gallery, Naples, Italy

2002

- One in the Other, London, UK
- Osterwalders Art Office, Hamburg, Germany

== Selected group exhibitions ==
2013

- Contemporary Silence, LisaBird Gallery, Austria

2011

- Roundabout – Tel Aviv Museum of Art, Tel Aviv, Israel
- Boundaries Obscured, Haunch of Venison, New York, NY, USA
- Apocalypse Now, Nieuw Dakota, Amsterdam

2010

- The Franks-Suss Collection – Phillips de Company at The Saatchi Gallery, London, England
- FRAGILE : Terres d’empathie, Daejeon Museum of Art, Korea
- Emporte-moi / Sweep Me Off My Feet, Museum of Contemporary Art of the Val-de-Marne, Paris, France

2009

- Emporte-moi / Sweep Me Off My Feet – The Musée National des *Beaux-Arts de Québec, Canada and Museum of Contemporary Art of the Val-de-Marne, Paris, France
- Essential Experiences – Palazzo Riso, Museo d’art contemporanea della Sicillia, Palermo
- The Figure and Dr Freud – Haunch of Venison, New York, NY, USA
- Fragile – Musee d’Art Modern de Saint-Etienne, France

2008

- Grotto – Museum 52, London, UK
- Et pendant ce temps – Nettie Horn Gallery, London, UK
- Micro-narratives – Musée d'Art moderne de Saint- Etienne, Saint-Etienne, France
- Gravity – Colección Ernesto Esposito, ARTIUM Centro-Museo Vasco de Arte Contemporáneo, Vitoria-Gasteiz, Spain
- Reconstruction – Sudeley Castle, Winchcombe, Gloucestershire, UK

2007

- Out of Art, Centre PasquArt, Kunsthaus Centre D'art, Biel, Switzerland
- Micro–Narratives, Museum of Contemporary Art, Belgrade, Serbia

2006

- Inaugural Exhibition, Goff+Rosenthal, Berlin, Germany
- iPod Killed the Radio Star, MAMA Showroom for Video and Media Art, Rotterdam, the Netherlands

2005

- Lorand Hegye, P.A.N. Museum, Naples, Italy
- The Future Lasts a Long Time, Le Consortium, Dijon, France
- Can't You Hear Me Knocking, Roebling Hall, New York

2004

- Group Show, Cell Projects, London, UK

2003

- Bag Lady, Cell Projects, London, UK
- A Pillow For Dreaming, Rossana Chisilie, Turin, Milan, Berlin
- From a Bag of Shit to Karma Kola, Osterwalder's Art Office, Hamburg, Germany
- Matchine Matchine, 27 Spital Square, London, UK

2002

- The Galleries Show, Royal Academy, London, UK
- May it Return in Spades, Bart Wells Institute, London, UK
- Summer in the city, Osterwalders Art Office, Hamburg, Germany
- Guardaroba, Via Venezia, Bari, Italy

2001

- The Poster Show, Hoxton Distillery, London, UK
- Record Collection, VTO, London, UK

2000

- Art Lab, Mobile Home, London, UK
- New Video, Caltech, Los Angeles, CA
- Behind the Beginners, Harvard Gallery, Boston, MA
- Heterogeneous Loves, CCA, Adelaide, Australia
- Harry Pie's Great British Art Show, Stark Gallery, London, UK
- It Might be Rubbish but its British Rubbish, Glass Box, Paris, France
- Photo15, Art Space NY, NY, New York
- Exit, Chisenhale Gallery, London, UK
