= James Gray =

James, Jim, or Jimmy Gray may refer to:

== Politicians ==
- James Gray (Australian politician) (1820–1889), member of the Tasmanian House of Assembly
- James Gray (British politician) (born 1954), British politician
- James Gray (mayor) (1862–1916), American journalist and mayor of Minneapolis, Minnesota
- James A. Gray Jr. (1889–1952), American tobacco executive and state senator
- James H. Gray Sr. (1916–1986), mayor of Albany, Georgia
- James P. Gray (New Hampshire politician) (born 1949), member of the New Hampshire Senate, and previously of the New Hampshire House of Representatives
- James W. Gray (1915-1987), American politician and judge
- Jim Gray (American politician) (born 1953), American politician, mayor of Lexington, Kentucky
- Jim Gray (jurist) (born 1945), American jurist, writer and Libertarian Party candidate
- Jim Gray (UDA member) (1958–2005), leader of the Ulster Defence Association
- James Roan Gray (1961–2026), Osage politician

== Sports ==
=== Association football (soccer) ===
- James Gray (footballer, born 1875) (1875–1937), English footballer
- James Gray (footballer, born 1992), Northern Irish footballer
- James Gray (Scottish footballer) (1893–1917), Scottish footballer
- Jimmy Gray (footballer) (1900–1978), Scottish footballer

=== Other sports ===
- James Gray (New Zealand cricketer) (1887-1975), played for Canterbury
- Jim Gray (infielder) (1862–1938), professional baseball infielder from 1884 to 1893 with Pittsburgh
- Jim Gray (third baseman) (fl. 1929), American baseball player
- Jim Gray (sportscaster) (born 1959), American sportscaster
- Jimmy Gray (English cricketer) (1926–2016), played for Hampshire from 1948 to 1966
- Jimmy Gray (GAA) (1929–2023), Irish sportsman

== Academics and writers ==
- Sir James Gray, 2nd Baronet (c. 1708–1773), diplomat and antiquary
- James Gray (poet) (died 1830), Scottish linguist and poet
- James Martin Gray (1851–1935), pastor, Bible scholar and president of Moody Bible Institute
- James Gray (mayor) (1862–1916), American journalist and mayor of Minneapolis, Minnesota
- James Gray (mathematician) (1876–1934), Scottish mathematician and physicist
- Sir James Gray (zoologist) (1891–1975), British zoologist
- James H. Gray (1906–1998), Canadian journalist, historian and author
- James L. Gray (1926–2010), Scottish turbine design engineer
- Jim Gray (computer scientist) (1944–lost at sea 2007), American computer scientist and Turing Award recipient

== Others ==
- Sir James Gray, 1st Baronet (1667–1722), armiger and merchant-Burgess of Edinburgh
- James Gray (director) (born 1969), American filmmaker
- James Gray (goldsmith), Scottish goldsmith
- James Gray (sculptor) (1866–1947), Scottish sculptor
- James Lorne Gray (1913–1987), Canadian, president of Atomic Energy of Canada Limited
- James K. Gray (born 1933), Canadian energy entrepreneur
- Jim Gray (actor) (born 1957), Canadian actor
- Jimmy Lee Gray (1948–1983), American murderer and first man to be executed in Mississippi since the death penalty was reinstated
- James "Jamie" Gray, horse dealer convicted of multiple counts of animal cruelty at Spindles Farm
- The male pseudonym of Hannah Snell (1723–1792), soldier
