= Cecil Gray (cricketer) =

Australian cricketer

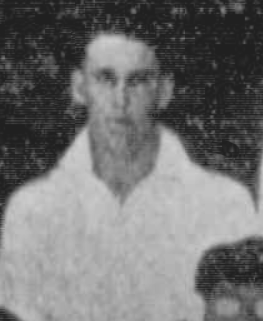

Personal information
- Born: 28 April 1902; Henley Beach, Australia
- Died: 26 September 1990 (aged 88); Bairnsdale, Victoria
- Source: Cricinfo, 6 August 2020

Cecil Gray (28 April 1902 – 26 September 1990) was an Australian cricketer. He played in three first-class matches for South Australia between 1921 and 1923.

== See also ==
- List of South Australian representative cricketers
