= Grays Point, Scott County, Missouri =

Ghost town in Missouri, United States

Coordinates: 37°14′25″N 89°28′07″W

Grays Point is an extinct town in Scott County, in the U.S. state of Missouri.

Variant names were "Graysboro" and "Ross Point". A post office called Graysboro was established in 1898, and remained in operation until 1907. The community has the name of William Gray, a pioneer citizen.
