= Elizabeth Gray (British artist) =

British artist

Elizabeth Gray (1928 - 2022), also known as Ben Venuto and Emmie Gee, was an artist specialising in sporting and wildlife pictures.

Gray was born in 1928 in Scarborough, Yorkshire, England. She began working as a musician and in broadcasting. However she also began to produce illustrations for magazines. She developed as an artist trying a large number of artistic mediums including water-colours and oil, finally specialising in wildlife and sporting pictures. She was awarded medals by the Royal Horticultural Society.

Shows of her artwork have been held in the UK and USA, including the Sportsman’s Edge Gallery, New York and her work is in the permanent collection of the Leigh Yawkey Woodson Art Museum in Wisconsin, USA. She had a long-term connection with the Nature-in-Art gallery in Gloucestershire and an extensive retrospective exhibition of her work was held there in 2015. Sale of her artwork was used to fund the purchase of an aeroplane for medical relief work in Africa.

In later life Gray lived in Newnham-on-Severn, Gloucestershire. She died in 2022.
