= Gary Stevens (radio) =

American broadcaster (1940–2025)

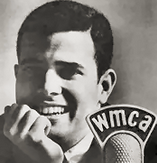
- Born: April 5, 1940; Buffalo, New York, U.S.
- Died: February 17, 2025 (aged 84); Delray Beach, Florida
- Education: University of Miami
- Occupation: Disc jockey
- Years active: 1965 – 1968
- Known for: WMCA's Good Guys

Gary Stevens (April 5, 1940 – February 17, 2025) was an American radio personality and disc jockey and later, an American music executive. Stevens is best known for being one of WMCA's "Good Guys", a line-up of high energy AM radio disc jockeys that served the greater New York City area in the mid to late 1960s. After Stevens retired from disc jockey duties in 1968, he embarked on a decades long career in the radio industry working as a station manager, program distributor and media investment advisor.

== Career ==
Stevens' interest in radios developed in his early years, growing up in Buffalo, New York. After graduation from high school, he attended the University of Miami. While on break from his studies, he launched his career in 1959 at WWOW in Conneaut, Ohio. Returning to Florida, he also worked at 610 WCKR, 1260 WAME (“Whammy in Miami”), and WFUN 79. In 1961, Stevens joined WIL in St. Louis. Two years later he achieved fame at WKNR (Keener 13) in Detroit, Michigan.

In 1965, Stevens moved to WMCA in New York and became part of that station's famous "Good Guys" line up of disc jockeys. While working there, Stevens vacationed in England and returned home with The Beatles Sgt. Pepper's Lonely Hearts Club Band album, which had not yet been released in the United States. Stevens played songs from the album on a heavy rotation during his 7–11 pm shift at WMCA, claiming that he was the only DJ in the United States who had access to the songs. During his shift, Stevens would frequently converse with his fictional sidekick, a teddy bear he named Wooly Burger, whom Stevens amusingly credited with smuggling the Sgt. Peppers album out of England.

During his tenure at WMCA, Stevens appeared as an imposter on the December 20, 1965 episode of the CBS game show To Tell the Truth. Despite his success in New York, after three years at WMCA Stevens left the station, telling his wife that he didn't want to be a 40 year old disc jockey.

In September 1968, Stevens moved to Europe where he started a company that sold American TV programs to foreign broadcasters. Stevens moved back to the United States in 1971 when Nelson Doubleday Jr. hired him as manager of KRIZ in Phoenix, Arizona. From 1971 to 1986 when Doubleday sold off its broadcast assets, Stevens worked in a number of positions, eventually being promoted to President of Doubleday Broadcasting, overseeing a portfolio that included radio stations in Detroit, St. Louis, Denver, Washington, DC, New York and other metropolitan areas.

When Doubleday divested their broadcast business in 1986, Stevens transitioned into media investment banking as Associate Managing Director at Wertheim & Company. He later started his own firm as President & CEO of Gary Stevens & Co., specializing in radio station investments while also serving on the boards of the National Association of Broadcasters, the Radio Advertising Bureau, the Electronic Media Ratings Council, and Saga Communications.

== Legacy ==
Although Stevens' work in the entertainment world lasted far longer than his time as a disc jockey, he is best remembered by the public for the years he spent at WMCA, particularly for his early play of Sergeant Peppers. "It was something like we'd never heard before. It was stunning to the ears."

Stevens was the last surviving member of WMCA's "Good Guys".

"People were not just tuning in to hear music and call letters, they tuned in for a friend, a familiar voice who made you feel good. If you were successful, you knew the secret: how to talk right directly to the audience. Gary had that secret." -- Bruce Morrow

“Although Gary Stevens’ accomplishments and influence on the radio industry stretched over more than half a century and was quite profound – kids of my generation, who had the opportunity to grow up in New York during the swingin’ sixties, will always remember him as one of the glorious WMCA Good Guys. His passing truly marks the end of an era.” -- Michael Harrison, Talkers Magazine

== Personal life ==
Stevens had a well-known love of sports cars and at various times in his life owned a Corvette, Maserati, Lamborghini, Ferrari, and Jaguar. "He liked attention, he liked dazzle," his son Christopher Stevens said, "He didn't care how fast they went. He liked how loud they were, and he liked the fact that everyone looked at you."

In 1966, he met his future wife Frankie, an airline stewardess, while driving a white Lincoln Continental convertible. Within a month, he had proposed and the couple stayed married until his death. They had three children.

Stevens was survived by his wife, Frankie; his children, Kristin (Stevens) Sexton, Christopher Stevens, and Victoria (Stevens) Chapman; and his grandchildren, Georgina and David Chapman III.
