= Ron Gray =

Ron Gray may refer to:

- Ron Gray (footballer) (1920–2002), English footballer and manager
- Ron Gray (politician), Canadian politician

== See also ==
- Ronald Gray (disambiguation)
- Ron Grey (1930–2022), Australian Army officer
