= House of Blood murders =

Scottish triple murder case

Edith McAlinden (born 1968) is a Scottish murderer who, along with her 17-year-old son John McAlinden and his 16-year-old friend Jamie Gray, was involved in a triple murder at a flat, dubbed "The House Of Blood", in Crosshill, Glasgow, Scotland on 17 October 2004.

== Murders ==
On 16 October 2004, McAlinden, a convicted thief, prostitute, and homeless drifter, was released from prison, having served a nine-month sentence for a serious assault. She visited a top-floor flat on Dixon Avenue, in Crosshill, where her boyfriend David Gillespie, 42, lived with fellow tenant Anthony Coyle, 71, and landlord Ian Mitchell, 67, whom McAlinden referred as "Pops".

An argument erupted between McAlinden and Gillespie during a drinking session, which spurred her into stabbing a knife in Gillespie's thighs repeatedly, severing a femoral vein in one thigh that caused him to bleed to death. McAlinden panicked and telephoned her son John for help. John arrived with his friend Jamie Gray by taxi. McAlinden persuaded Mitchell to pay for their taxi fare. He agreed, mistakenly believing that her son and his friend had come to help Gillespie.

When John realised Mitchell was a witness, he fatally stabbed him and kicked his head repeatedly, which caused his brain to bleed heavily. Coyle escaped to his bedroom where he locked himself in. John and Jamie used a drill to remove the door locks and forced their way into the bedroom. Jamie chased Coyle and beat him to death with a golf club.

Two hours later, at approximately 3:00, McAlinden went to neighbour James Sweeney's house and claimed something had happened at Ian Mitchell's flat. She begged him to check. Sweeney went to the flat and once he saw the state of the hallway, he phoned the emergency services on his mobile phone. He later revealed to local reporters that walls and floors were covered with blood, which quickly earned the killings a nickname, "The House of Blood."

== Investigation ==
When the police and paramedics arrived, they found McAlinden alone and clinging to Gillespie's body, screaming at him to wake up. McAlinden was formally charged next day, Monday 18 October, at Glasgow Sheriff Court for the murders. During the investigation, the police speculated McAlinden did not act alone and that there were two or three strong men involved because, according to a police record during the trial, "there was so much blood in the flat that it was impossible to be precise about the details of the violence."

== Trial and sentence ==
In May 2005, Edith McAlinden, John McAlinden and Jamie Gray appeared at Glasgow High Court. All denied murdering Mitchell, Coyle, and Gillespie. During the trial, prosecutor Sean Murphy QC claimed that the victims had been "beaten with knives, metal files, a belt, and pieces of wood" and "hit with a bottle, punched, stabbed and stamped on the head, and had boiling water poured over them". The defendants changed their pleas during the trial: John McAlinden admitted he killed Mitchell, Jamie Gray admitted killing Coyle, and Edith McAlinden admitted killing Gillespie.

On 29 June 2005, Edith McAlinden was sentenced to life imprisonment with a minimum tariff of 13 years. John McAlinden and Jamie Gray were each given a minimum tariff of 12 years. It is known that John McAlinden was liberated in 2016, but was imprisoned again in 2018 for breaching the conditions of his licence.

== Media ==
The McAlindens' case has been profiled on Deadly Women during the third segment of the episode "Mommy's Little Helpers."
