= Jason Gray (poet) =

American poet

- Born: Hibbing, Minnesota
- Education: Ohio State University (M.F.A.)
- Writing career
- Genre: Poetry
- Website: jason-gray.net

Jason Gray is an American poet whose first book, Photographing Eden, was the winner of the 2008 Hollis Summers Poetry Prize. His second, Radiation King, won the Idaho Prize for Poetry from Lost Horse Press. Gray's poems have been published in The American Poetry Review, The Kenyon Review, Poetry, and other prominent literary journals. He serves as co-editor of the online journal poetry journal, Unsplendid, and was a 2009 Peter Taylor Fellow at the Kenyon Review Writers' Workshop.

His other awards and honors include a Walter Dakin Fellowship to the Sewanee Writers' Conference, an Individual Artist Award from the Maryland State Council for the Arts, and a fellowship from the Vermont Studio Center.

== Bibliography ==
- —— (2003). Adam & Eve Go to the Zoo. San Jose, Calif: Dream Horse Press. ISBN 9780965930772. OCLC 779974810. Winner of the 2003 National Poetry Chapbook Prize
- —— (2008). Photographing Eden: Poems. Athens, Ohio: Ohio University Press. ISBN 9780821418352. OCLC 502279941.
- —— (2007). How to Paint the Savior Dead. Kent: Kent State University Press. ISBN 9781306395687. OCLC 869525367. Wick Poetry Chapbook Series
- Gray, Jason (2019). Radiation King. Sandpoint, ID: Lost Horse Press. ISBN 9780999199435.
