= KAHZ =

Radio station in Pomona, California

Repeater of KAZN, Pasadena, CA
- Pomona, California; United States
- Broadcast area: Pomona Valley
- Frequency: 1600 kHz
- Branding: KAZN AM 1300 中文廣播電臺

Programming
- Language: Mandarin

Ownership
- Owner: Multicultural Broadcasting; (Multicultural Radio Broadcasting Licensee, LLC)
- Sister stations: KALI, KALI-FM, KAZN, KBLA, KMRB

History
- First air date: July 22, 1947
- Former call signs: KPMO (1947–1955); KBUZ (1955); KWOW (1955–1987); KMNY (1987–2005)

Technical information
- Licensing authority: FCC
- Facility ID: 61814
- Class: B
- Power: 5,000 watts
- Transmitter coordinates: 34°01′48″N 117°43′38.2″W

Links
- Public license information: Public file; LMS
- Webcast: Listen live
- Website: www.am1300.com

Chinese name
- Traditional Chinese: KAZN AM 1300 中文廣播電臺
- Simplified Chinese: KAZN AM 1300 中文广播电台
- Hanyu Pinyin: KAZN AM 1300 zhōng wén guǎng bō diàn tái

KAHZ (1600 AM) is a commercial radio station licensed to Pomona, California, United States. The station is owned by Multicultural Broadcasting and is a full-time simulcast of KAZN, a Chinese language station licensed in Pasadena.

The station first signed on in 1947 as KPMO. For nearly four decades, the station was owned by Dean H. Wickstrom and his family. KPMO began as a community radio station serving Pomona. In 1955, KPMO became KWOW. Throughout the 1960s, KWOW had a country music format. Then for much of the 1970s and 1980s, KWOW had an oldies format.

In 1986, the Wickstrom family sold KWOW to local investment advisor Edward "Buz" Schwartz. The station changed its call sign to KMNY in 1987 and was branded "Money Radio" after Schwartz's investment company. KMNY was reportedly the first 24-hour business news and talk station in the U.S. However, the station was controversial from the start, as Schwartz was under investigation by the state of California for securities fraud; the Federal Communications Commission fined KMNY in 1990 for multiple violations, including failures to disclose that guests purchased time on the station.

Multicultural Broadcasting purchased the station in 1998. Early in its ownership of KMNY, the station had a variety of its previous financial programming, music, and programming in Vietnamese and Cantonese. This time programming completely in Chinese, KMNY returned to business news full time in 2000. In 2005, KMNY became KAHZ and dropped its original programming to simulcast KAZN full time.

== History ==
=== As KPMO (1947–1955) ===
Founded by Valley Broadcasting Company, whose partners included Dean H. Wickstrom and Walter Sorenson. The station first signed on as KPMO on July 22, 1947, with 500 watts of power and was the first radio station based in Pomona. It broadcast from a Quonset Hut on the south side of Holt Ave (1200 East Holt) in what was an orange grove. The transmitting antenna was behind the studio building. At the time, Holt Ave was the main highway (US-99 and US-70) between Los Angeles and San Bernardino. The sound of trucks and automobiles was audible on the air when the mic was opened. An independent station not affiliated with any national network, KPMO included many programs sponsored by local organizations including community hospital Pomona Health Council, Mt. San Antonio College, and a Mexican-American arts group.

=== As KWOW (1955–1987) ===
After a brief time as KBUZ from September 23, the station picked up call sign KWOW beginning November 15, 1955.

Around 1962, KWOW became a country music station branded "The Big 16 K-Wow". After nearly a decade as a country station, KWOW changed to oldies around early 1972.

In 1985, KWOW began broadcasting Cal State Fullerton Titans football and basketball games. A 1986 Los Angeles Times column described its playlist as being "for aging flower children" and including hits from the early 1960s such as "You Better Move On" by Arthur Alexander and "Bristol Stomp" by The Dovells.

After nearly four decades of ownership, the Wickstrom family sold KWOW to Edward "Buz" Schwartz, host of an investment talk show on KIEV in Glendale, for $1.75 million in October 1986.

=== As KMNY (1987–2005) ===
On March 12, 1987, KWOW changed its call sign to KMNY and its format to business news and talk, with the brand "Money Radio". Operated by the Anaheim investment firm of the same name, "Money Radio" was reportedly the first station with a full-time business format. The station broadcast from the floor of the Pacific Stock Exchange upon its launch but stopped doing so after only a few weeks.

However, "Money Radio" attracted controversy from its inception. Schwartz overstated the strength of the station's signal by claiming could be heard as far as Barstow and San Diego. The California Department of Corporations was also investigating Schwartz for securities fraud, with his claims about KMNY's signal among the possible grounds.

In 1990, KMNY was fined $10,000 by the Federal Communications Commission for failing to disclose that stockbrokers and investment advisors paid the station to be interview guests, among other violations of broadcasting law.

In 1994, KMNY was the flagship station for the Rancho Cucamonga Quakes minor league baseball team as it won the California League championship.

Multicultural Broadcasting purchased KMNY for $7.55 million in September 1998. KMNY's weekday schedule was changed so that Money Radio's financial talk ran from noon to 4, followed by a freeform music program from 4 to 8 p.m., Vietnamese programs from 8 p.m. to midnight, and Cantonese programs from midnight to noon.

In a slight return to its previous format, KMNY changed its format to business news/talk in July 2000 albeit in Chinese, branded "Chinese News & Money Radio".

=== As KAHZ (2005–present) ===
KMNY changed its call sign to KAHZ on March 4, 2005. In June 2005, KAHZ became a full simulcast of Multicultural Broadcasting's Mandarin Chinese station KAZN. The simulcast continues as of 2021.
