= Danny Stiles =

American radio personality (1923–2011)

- Born: December 2, 1923; Newark, New Jersey, U.S.
- Died: March 11, 2011 (aged 87); Manhattan, New York City, U.S.
- Other name: The Vicar
- Website: www.dannystiles.com

Danny Stiles (December 2, 1923 – March 11, 2011) was a radio personality at WEVD, WNYC, WNSW, WJDM and WPAT in the New York City market. He worked on the radio for 63 years in the New York City area, up to the time of his death.

== Early life ==
Danny Stiles was born and grew up in Newark and Linden, New Jersey, during The Great Depression. After graduating from high school in 1941, he enlisted in the U.S. Navy after the bombing of Pearl Harbor. After being honorably discharged due to an injured hip, Stiles went to college and held several jobs before starting his radio career.

== Career ==
Stiles's first radio job was at WHBI in Newark on December 2, 1947, buying the air time for $65 a week. His career took him to WHOL in Allentown, Pennsylvania, and stations in New Jersey before returning to Newark on WNJR (AM) as the "Kat Man." At WNJR, Danny met Robert Smith, a young Brooklyn native working as a gofer, who would later move to the border blaster XERB-AM and broadcast as Wolfman Jack.

Stiles, who among other alliterative monikers called himself The Vicar of Vintage Vinyl, had a loyal fan following and a distinctive radio presence. At the end of his life, Danny was heard on four stations in Metro New York, on WRCA AM 1330, serving the Boston, Massachusetts area, and was streaming 24 hours a day on the Internet. The broadcast material came largely from his personal collection of over 250,000 records, many in their original 78 rpm format.

After his death on March 11, 2011, Stiles continued to be heard, with vintage shows re-aired Saturday nights at 8 pm Eastern time on WNYC AM 820, until its final broadcast on January 3, 2015. His website dannystiles.com still offers a stream of archived shows.
