= WWRU =

Korean American radio station

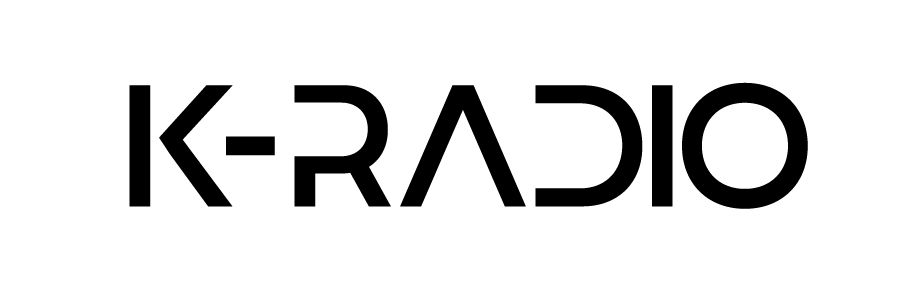
- Jersey City, New Jersey; United States
- Broadcast area: New York metropolitan area
- Frequency: 1660 kHz
- Branding: AM 1660 K-Radio

Programming
- Language: Korean

Ownership
- Owner: Multicultural Broadcasting; (Multicultural Radio Broadcasting Licensee, LLC)
- Operator: New York Radio Korea
- Sister stations: WKDM; WPAT; WZRC

History
- First air date: December 8, 1995
- Former call signs: WJDM (1995–1998); WBAH (1998–1999)
- Call sign meaning: Radio Unica (former format)

Technical information
- Licensing authority: FCC
- Facility ID: 87123
- Class: B
- Power: 10,000 watts
- Transmitter coordinates: 40°49′13.36″N 74°4′2.51″W

Links
- Public license information: Public file; LMS
- Webcast: Listen live
- Website: www.am1660.com

WWRU (1660 kHz) is a commercial AM radio station licensed to Jersey City, New Jersey, broadcasting to the New York metropolitan area. It airs Korean language talk and music shows, from its radio studios in Manhattan.

WWRU broadcasts at 10,000 watts around the clock, using a directional antenna, from its transmitter located off Paterson Plank Road in Carlstadt, New Jersey.

== History ==
WWRU originated as the expanded band "twin" of an existing station, WJDM in Elizabeth City, New Jersey, at 1530 kHz on the standard AM band.

WJDM's president, John R. Quinn, was frustrated that the station was limited to daytime-only operation, and required to sign-off at night, because it was located within protected nighttime coverage area of a Class I "clear channel" station, WCKY in Cincinnati, Ohio. In addition, there were no unused fulltime assignments available on the AM and FM bands in the congested New York City region.

On June 8, 1988, an International Telecommunication Union-sponsored conference held at Rio de Janeiro, Brazil adopted provisions, effective July 1, 1990, to extend the upper end of the Region 2 (which included the United States) AM broadcast band, by adding ten frequencies for fulltime stations. Quinn saw this as an opportunity for WJDM to move to a new frequency allowing fulltime operation. It was arranged for congressional representative Matthew J. Rinaldo to introduce legislation that added a carefully worded provision to the Communications Act of 1934 in late 1991, mandating that "It shall be the policy of the Federal Communications Commission, in any case in which the licensee of an existing AM daytime-only station located in a community with a population of more than 100,000 persons that lacks a local full-time aural station licensed to that community and that is located within a Class I station primary service area notifies the Commission that such licensee seeks to provide full-time service".

This addition successfully advanced WJDM's status, and on December 8, 1995 the station began broadcasting on the additional frequency of 1660 kHz, as the country's first with regular broadcasting on the expanded band.

On March 17, 1997, the Federal Communications Commission (FCC) completed the process of determining which stations would be permitted to move to the expanded band frequencies, and WJDM was included among the eighty-eight selected, now formally authorized to move from 1530 to 1660 kHz.

The FCC's initial policy was that both the original station and its expanded band counterpart could operate simultaneously for up to five years, after which owners would have to turn in one of the two licenses, depending on whether they preferred the new assignment or elected to remain on the original frequency, although this deadline was extended multiple times. WJDM ceased broadcasting on January 30, 2019, and its license was cancelled April 10, 2020.

AM 1660 launched on December 8, 1995, and Radio AAHS network children's programming debuted on February 1, 1996, which lasted until 1997, with the station acting as the network's New York City owned and operated affiliate, and began broadcasting in C-QUAM AM Stereo. Until other stations were licensed on the frequency and adjacent channels in other parts of the country in subsequent years, WJDM could be heard at night throughout the eastern U.S. and Canada. After more than two years of operation in the expanded band sharing the WJDM call letters, a construction permit for the 1660 station was assigned the call letters WBAH on May 11, 1998.

When AAHS' parent company, Children's Broadcasting Corporation, discontinued the format in January 1998, the ten CBC-owned stations, including WJDM, began airing Beat Radio, a club dance music format, every night between 7 pm and 7 am while a random mix of music was broadcast during the day. In June 1998, the young Radio Unica network entered into a Limited Marketing Agreement (LMA) with CBC and began airing its own Spanish talk programming, including World Cup Soccer and many New York Yankees games. Radio Unica announced an agreement to purchase the station in October 1998, and the transaction was completed on January 14, 1999.

The station call sign was changed to WWRU on February 15, 1999. WWRU later changed its community of license to Jersey City, New Jersey. Multicultural Broadcasting purchased WWRU in December 2003. The station then leased the time to Radio Seoul, which had just left WNSW in an effort to gain a stronger signal in the market. Sister station WZRC, which had broadcast in Korean, switched to Chinese language at the same time.
