= WZRC =

Cantonese radio station in New York City

- New York, New York; United States
- Broadcast area: New York metropolitan area
- Frequency: 1480 kHz
- Branding: AM1480

Programming
- Language: Chinese
- Format: Cantonese news/talk and music

Ownership
- Owner: Multicultural Broadcasting; (Multicultural Radio Broadcasting Licensee, LLC)
- Sister stations: WKDM; WPAT; WWRU

History
- First air date: 1925
- Former call signs: WIBS (1925–1930); WHOM (1930–1975); WJIT (1975–1989)
- Call sign meaning: Z Rock; (former satellite network)

Technical information
- Licensing authority: FCC
- Facility ID: 27398
- Class: B
- Power: 5,000 watts
- Transmitter coordinates: 40°50′42.4″N 74°01′10.5″W

Links
- Public license information: Public file; LMS
- Webcast: Listen live
- Website: nysino.com/am1480/

WZRC, known on-air as "AM1480" (simplified Chinese: 中文广播电台; traditional Chinese: 中文廣播電臺; pinyin: Zhōngwén Guǎngbò Diàntái; Jyutping: Zung1 Man4 Gwong2 Bo3 Din6 Toi4), is a radio station licensed to New York, New York, serving the New York metropolitan area. The station is owned by Multicultural Broadcasting and airs Cantonese programming.

WZRC's transmitting facility is a four tower array located in Ridgefield Park, New Jersey. It operates with 5 kilowatts fulltime, with different directional configurations during the day and at night.

== History ==
WZRC was first licensed on June 29, 1925, as a portable broadcasting station, with the sequentially issued call letters of WIBS, to the New Jersey National Guard, 57th Infantry Brigade, in Elizabeth, New Jersey. (Portable radio stations were installed on movable platforms such as trucks, so they could be transported to various locations.) In early 1926 ownership of the station was changed to Lieut. Thomas F. Hunter, and in mid-1927 the station was reported to be "no longer portable". In November 1927 the station's owner became the New Jersey Broadcasting Corporation, located at 80 Broad Street in Elizabeth.

On May 25, 1928, the recently formed Federal Radio Commission (FRC) issued General Order 32, which notified 164 stations, including WIBS, that "From an examination of your application for future license it does not find that public interest, convenience, or necessity would be served by granting it." However, the station successfully convinced the commission that it should remain licensed.

On November 11, 1928, the FRC implemented a sweeping reallocation of station transmitting frequencies, as part of a reorganization resulting from its General Order 40. The New York City area had a large excess of stations, and WIBS was ordered to begin timesharing on 1450 kHz with four other New Jersey stations: WNJ (Newark), WBMS (Union City), WAAT (Jersey City) and WKBO (Jersey City). WAAT (now WNYM) was able to quickly gain permission to move to 1070 kHz, but this still left WIBS in the tenuous financial situation of reduced operating hours and revenues due to having to share its frequency with three other stations.

=== WHOM and the Popes (1930 - 1960) ===
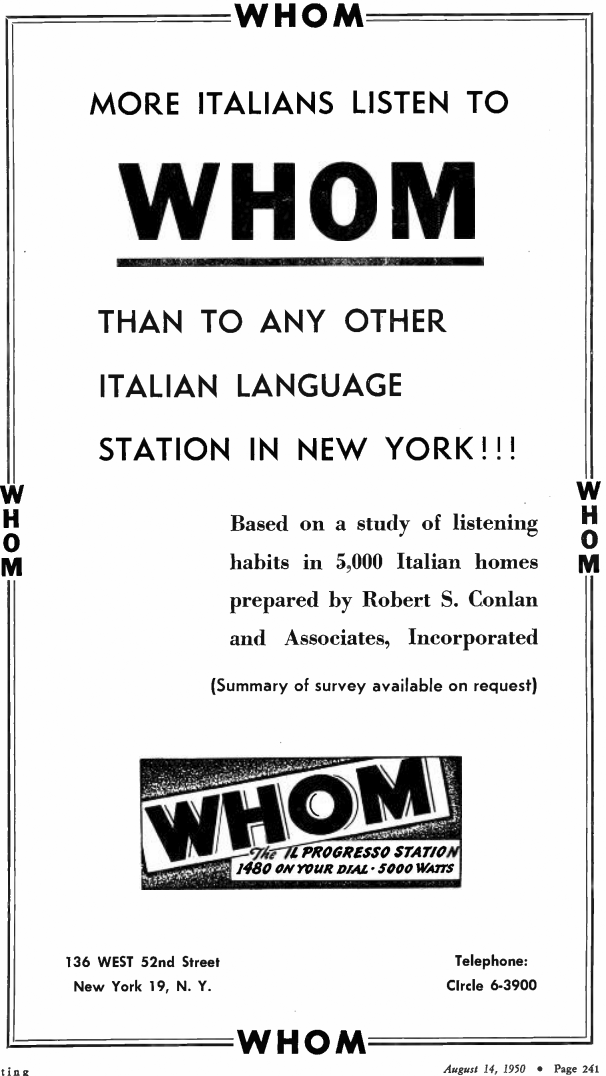
1950 station advertisement

On April 12, 1930, the station's call letters were changed to WHOM, standing for owner Harry O'Melia, operated by the New Jersey Broadcasting Company, with studios in Jersey City. At the start of 1933 WHOM was still limited to one-quarter of the airtime on its shared frequency, however during the year it was able to achieve full time operation. In April, it expanded to use of three-quarters of the hours, after the FRC refused to renew WNJ's license, and WHOM's owners purchased and silenced WKBO. A few weeks later, WBMS was acquired and shut down, giving WHOM unlimited use of its frequency. The station's format was a combination of educational programming, ethnic programming, sports, and some music. Among the personalities who broadcast on WHOM was African-American sportscaster Jocko Maxwell; by the time he joined the station in 1934, it had studios in Newark, and would later add a studio in New York.

By 1940, the station was known for mainly its foreign language programming. On March 29, 1941, WHOM moved from 1450 kHz to 1480 kHz, its location ever since, as part of the implementation of the North American Regional Broadcasting Agreement. In 1944, WHOM was sold to the Iowa Broadcasting Company. But the new parent company, better known as Cowles Broadcasting, did not own the station long. Arrangements were made to sell it to Generoso Pope, owner of the Italo-Americano Publishing Company, in late 1946. Pope finalized the acquisition, and then operated the station with a combination of news, ethnic music, and educational programs, as before. The Popes built a media empire, including: The National Enquirer, Il Progresso Italo-Americano, Il Bollettino della Sera, Il Corriere d'America, and the Philadelphia daily L'Opinione. Pope used his influence through his media empire to secure the vote of the election of President Franklin D. Roosevelt, and Harry S. Truman.

In the late 1940s, WHOM introduced a new popular music program; it featured the city's only interracial deejay team, Willie Bryant and Ray Carroll. Their WHOM program lasted until 1954, at which time the general manager decided he wanted a change; Bryant believed it was due to a complaint from a sponsor.

In December 1950, the station received permission to move its main studio location from Jersey City to New York City.

=== 1960 – 1982 ===
In 1960, WHOM evolved to mostly Spanish programming. In 1975 the station was sold to SJR Communications along with WHOM-FM (now WINS-FM) and the call sign was changed to WJIT (Radio Jit). The format went from diversified Spanish to Spanish contemporary music. In the late 1970s WJIT was the leading salsa and merengue station on the New York dial. In 1982 the format was changed to Spanish adult contemporary and the station was sold, along with WKTU 92.3, to Infinity Broadcasting.

=== 1982 – 1998 ===
In 1989, Infinity decided that with a new Spanish station on 97.9 that it should move 1480 WJIT (by then known as talk station 1480 Radio America) to an English format. The Spanish format was dropped on April 30, 1990, at 3 pm, and the station began airing a heavy metal based satellite rock format "Z Rock", under its new call-sign WZRC.

On May 27, 1993, WZRC switched to country through Transtar's "Mainstream Country" satellite-delivered service. This was short lived; a few months later, WZRC switched to Korean brokered programming. Infinity continued to own the radio station until after its merger with CBS in 1997. At that point, it owned 92.3 WXRK, 101.1 WCBS-FM, 102.7 WNEW-FM, 660 WFAN, 880 WCBS, 1010 WINS, and 1480 WZRC. While it was not required to sell WZRC, it opted to anyhow, and sold the station to Multicultural Media in 1998.

=== After 1998 ===
Multicultural initially kept the Korean format, but switched to Chinese on March 1, 2001, and now in Cantonese (to complement Multicultural's Sinocast network broadcast locally on 92.3 FM subcarrier). Nowadays, in addition to its own programming, WZRC sometimes rebroadcasts other Cantonese content from KMRB radio in San Francisco, as well as from Commercial Radio Hong Kong and RTHK.
