= WNSW =

Relevant Radio station in Newark, New Jersey

- Newark, New Jersey; United States
- Broadcast area: New York Metropolitan area
- Frequency: 1430 kHz
- Branding: Relevant Radio

Programming
- Format: Catholic radio
- Network: Relevant Radio

Ownership
- Owner: Relevant Radio; (Relevant Radio, Inc.)

History
- First air date: 1941
- Former call signs: WBYN (1941–1947); WNJR (1947–1999)

Technical information
- Licensing authority: FCC
- Facility ID: 73332
- Class: B
- Power: 10,000 watts day; 7,000 watts night
- Transmitter coordinates: 40°50′59″N 74°10′59″W

Links
- Public license information: Public file; LMS
- Webcast: Listen Live
- Website: www.relevantradio.com

WNSW (1430 AM) is a religious-formatted broadcast radio station, licensed to Newark, New Jersey, and serving the New York Metropolitan area.

WNSW has been owned and operated by Relevant Radio, a Roman Catholic radio network, since 2014. It transmits from the four towers leased from WPAT (AM) in Clifton.

== Early history ==
WNSW's origin is the result of the consolidation of multiple stations, located in the New York City region, that dated to the mid-1920s.

After the Federal Radio Commission (FRC) was formed in 1927, it soon determined that there were significantly more stations operating in the New York City area than could be given exclusive frequency assignments. On November 11, 1928, the FRC made a major nationwide reallocation under its General Order 40, and assigned four New York area stations—WCGU, WSGH-WSDA, WLTH and WBBC—to share time on 1400 kHz. (WSDA, operated jointly with WSGH, was the oldest of these stations, first licensed in 1923 as WSAP.)

In March 1941, the four stations—WARD (formerly WCGU), WBBC, WVFW (formerly WSGH-WSDA and WFOX) and WLTH—were reassigned to 1430 kHz, as part of the implementation of the North American Regional Broadcasting Agreement.

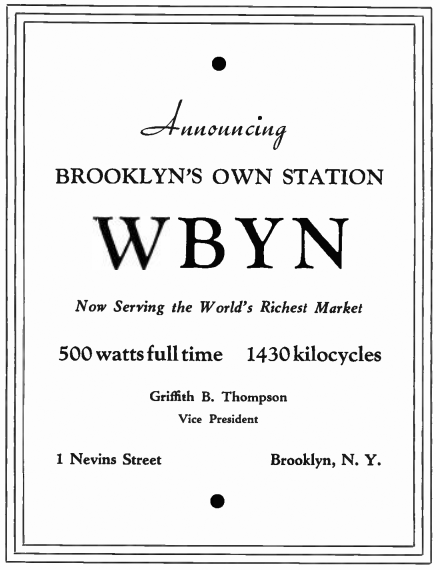
In 1941, four New York area stations were consolidated as WBYN.

== WBYN ==
An agreement was made later in 1941 to consolidate the four stations as a joint operation, organized as the Unified Broadcasting Corporation. The board of directors of the consolidated operation included Samuel Gellard, former president and general manager of WLTH, Aaron Kronenberg, president and general manager of WARD, Slavatore di Angelo, managing director of WVFW, and Peter Testan, WBBC manager. The original plan was to continue broadcasting using the WARD call letters, but the consolidated station instead adopted the call sign of WBYN. Beginning in 1944 the station aired an unsuccessful prototype of an all-news format.

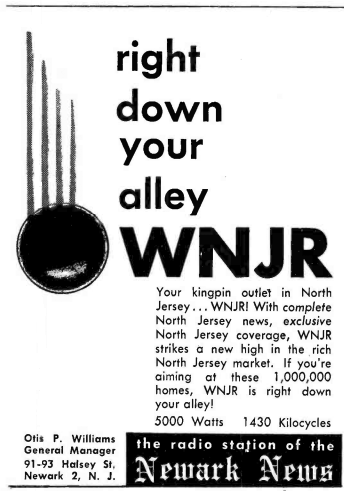
In 1947, the station moved to Newark and the call sign changed to WNJR

== WNJR ==
The station was eventually licensed to broadcast with a transmitter power output (TPO) of 5,000 watts, the maximum at the time allowed for stations operating on a "regional" frequency. In 1946, The Newark Sunday Call purchased WBYN, through its subsidiary, North Jersey Radio. At the time, The Newark Sunday Call was being purchased by the Newark Evening News. In 1947, the call sign was changed to WNJR and the community of license was changed to Newark. The station diversified its programming, running jazz blocks, R&B music, talk shows, and Latin music. In 1953, Rollins Broadcasting bought the station.

As Newark's population became increasingly African-American in the 1960s, WNJR evolved into an R&B music format full-time. Some of the jockeys included Hal Wade, Danny Stiles, Bobby Jay, and Hal Jackson. In 1967, Rollins Broadcasting, after a dispute with its air staff, restructured into Continental Broadcasting. During the 1950s and 1960s the station featured some of the earliest rock and roll programming in the New York area, including the first claim to airing Alan Freed in that region. Despite being licensed to Newark, from the late 1950s through the 1970s the station broadcast from a studio in Union.

The station's two 344-foot (105 m) guyed broadcast towers were well known to residents of the newly developed College Estates section of Union. WNJR suffered from poor nighttime signal coverage due to its FCC-mandated directional antenna signal pattern. Additionally the station's antenna system's capacity hat design radiated too much signal skyward and not enough toward the ground where listeners reside. This caused signal cancellation and fading. Co-channel interference also limited its nighttime coverage ..

=== License revocation ===
In 1968 the FCC denied Continental Broadcasting's license renewal, after finding that the former manager, Leonard Mireison, had committed "gross mismanagement and fraud on the commission", although it was allowed to continue to run the station, which was profitable, while this decision was being appealed. The soul format continued as well. As Newark became predominantly African-American during the 1970s, WNJR switched to a black-oriented music and news format.

=== Interim Operation assignments ===
In July 1971 WNJR's license was officially revoked and the station went off the air on July 21. It signed back on a week later, still as WNJR, after the FCC authorized the City of Newark to run the station under an Interim Operation authorization. However, the next year the city informed the FCC that it could no longer afford to run the station, and a new Interim Operation authorization, again still as WNJR, was assigned to a three-member consortium operating as the WNJR Radio Company.

WNJR continued with an urban contemporary format and became the flagship station of Unity Broadcasting's National Black Network (now Sheridan Broadcasting's American Urban Radio Networks) in 1973. WNJR evolved into more of an urban adult contemporary (AC) format by 1978. Also, the station played gospel music and sermons on Sunday mornings and evenings.

While WNJR was being run under Interim Operation authorizations, the FCC held hearings to determine a new permanent licensee, and in 1977 Sound Radio received the grant for the WNJR replacement. Under the new owners the WNJR call sign was retained and the format stayed much the same. Initially the station was profitable, but by 1988 it began to lose money as its core audience switched to New York City's two FM urban powerhouses, WBLS and WRKS (98.7 Kiss FM). In 1989, Sound Radio filed for Chapter 7 bankruptcy.

=== Brokered format ===
In 1991 American Radio Associates bought the station and attempted to keep the urban AC format, but also had financial problems, and sold the station to Douglas Broadcasting in 1992. At that point the station dropped its urban AC format in favor of gospel music mornings and late afternoons, ethnic brokered shows mid-days and nights, and gospel music and teaching on Sundays.

In 1995, Multicultural Broadcasting bought the station and shifted its programming to include more Asian shows. They kept some gospel music programming on Sundays. The station was then profitable.

== WNSW ==
=== Sunny 1430 ===
After WQEW in New York City became Radio Disney on December 28, 1998, WNJR began playing adult standards. Julius LaRosa was the morning host, while Johnny Michaels hosted during the afternoon. In March 1999, Multicultural decided to fill the hole and put a standards format on 1430. WNJR changed its callsign to WNSW on June 8, 1999. The station became known as Sunny 1430. They originally planned to switch to this format full-time except for Sunday mornings, but initially would run this format from 6 a.m. to 7 p.m. weekdays and 10 a.m. to midnight Saturdays and not at all on Sundays. The rest of the time they ran ethnic programming that was brokered. On Sundays they played gospel music and preaching.

During the week though they played a standards format with artists like Frank Sinatra and Neil Diamond. The format was similar to 1560 WQEW's old format. They mixed in baby boomer pop in moderation. Still they focused on the standards. Some of the airpeople included Johnny Knox (who was program director and operations manager the first year of operation), John Von Soosten, Chuck Leonard, Danny Stiles, Julius LaRosa, among others.

=== Standards demise ===
It was decided that once advertising grew enough to support standards that they would drop the weekend brokered shows that were still the main source of revenue for WNSW. This never happened. The station was unable to sell even a moderate amount of commercial time but held on to the format during daytime in the week and Saturdays. Brokered shows were the only source of substantial income for WNSW, but it was not enough to keep the station profitable. In 2000 the station moved toward a Big Band focus and dropped the Neil Diamond and Elvis cuts.

Finally on February 28, 2001, WNSW dropped the format altogether with the playing of Frank Sinatra's Softly, as I Leave You. The format, however, continued with a few evening hours with Danny Stiles. The rest of the day reverted to brokered programming.

In early 2007, WNSW applied to move their transmitter from Hillside, New Jersey, to Clifton, New Jersey. In 2008, the Hillside Township towers were dismantled.

=== Voice of Russia ===
In January 2011, WNSW converted to a 24-hour simulcast of the English language service of the Voice of Russia and maintained this format until April 2014, when owner Multicultural Broadcasting sold the station.

=== Relevant Radio ===
In April 2014, the station was sold to Starboard Broadcasting for $10 million and switched to religious Catholic programming with the branding of Relevant Radio.
