= WKDM =

Radio station in New York City

- New York, New York; United States
- Broadcast area: New York metropolitan area
- Frequency: 1380 kHz
- Branding: AM1380

Programming
- Languages: Chinese (weekdays); Spanish (weekends)
- Format: Brokered Mandarin Chinese (weekdays); Spanish language Christian radio (weekends)

Ownership
- Owner: Multicultural Broadcasting; (Multicultural Radio Broadcasting Licensee, LLC)
- Sister stations: WPAT; WWRU; WZRC

History
- First air date: September 25, 1926
- Former call signs: WKBQ (1926–1930); WBNX (1930–1984); WKDM (1984–2000); WNNY (2000–2002); WLXE (2002–2003)

Technical information
- Licensing authority: FCC
- Facility ID: 71137
- Class: B
- Power: 5,000 watts (day); 13,000 watts (night)
- Transmitter coordinates: 40°49′13.4″N 74°04′2.5″W

Links
- Public license information: Public file; LMS
- Webcast: Listen live
- Website: nysino.com/am1380/

WKDM (1380 kHz) is a commercial AM radio station licensed to New York, New York. The station is owned by Multicultural Broadcasting and broadcasts in Mandarin Chinese on weekdays. Most shows are brokered programming, where the host pays for the time and may sell commercials to support the broadcasts. On weekends, programming switches to Spanish language Christian radio.

WKDM operates at 5,000 watts by day, using a directional antenna to protect other stations on 1380 AM. After being granted a Federal Communications Commission (FCC) construction permit to increase night power, it operates at 13,000 watts after sunset, using a different directional pattern. The station's transmitter is located in Carlstadt, New Jersey.

== History ==
The station began operation in 1926, as WKBQ. The original call sign was randomly assigned from a sequential roster of available call letters. One of the station's first permanent homes was inside Starlight Park, an amusement park located on the east bank of the Bronx River just south of East 177th Street. This tenancy lasted until 1932, when the Great Depression forced the park's closure, which then led to the station's eviction from its studios.

Beginning in the 1920s, there were significantly more radio stations operating in the New York City area than could be given exclusive frequency assignments. WKBQ changed frequencies several times during its early years. On November 11, 1928, the Federal Radio Commission made a major nationwide reallocation under its General Order 40, and WKBQ was moved to 1350 kHz, sharing this frequency with three other local stations: WBNY, WMSG and WCDA.

In 1930, the call sign WKBQ was changed to WBNX, reflecting the station's location in The Bronx. In 1933, the owners of WCDA worked to consolidate the four time-sharing stations on 1350 kHz into a single station, to serve as the primary affiliate for the currently forming Amalgamated Broadcasting System. Eventually only three of the stations were merged, which continued operation under the WBNX call letters. In addition, Amalgamated quickly failed, and ended operations at midnight on November 1, 1933.

The holdout from the 1933 consolidation was the former WBNY, now WAWZ. WBNX operated 18 hours a day with general entertainment and brokered programming. In March 1941, WBNX and WAWZ were moved to 1380 kHz, as part of the implementation of the North American Regional Broadcasting Agreement.

In 1960, WBNX was sold to United Broadcasting. By the mid-1960s, the station was airing a Spanish contemporary music format during most of its hours, with some Jewish-oriented and Italian-language programming on weekends.

In 1984, WBNX changed call letters to WKDM. It became a full-time operation after United paid WAWZ owner Pillar of Fire to give up its portion of the time-share (WAWZ continued to operate on FM). It remained successful until the advent of a full-time Spanish language format on WSKQ-FM in 1989, which pulled away listeners. As a result, in the early 1990s, the station began to carry more leased-access/brokered shows. In 1992, it went completely brokered, and was sold to Multicultural in 1994.

In 1999, Multicultural transferred WKDM to Mega Communications in exchange for cash and various Washington D.C. area stations. Mega changed the call letters to WNNY and instituted an all news Spanish format (Noticas 1380). Eventually, the all-news evolved into a news/talk format. This format was not successful, and on July 24, 2002, at midnight, Mega had changed the call letters to WLXE and the format to Mexican pop music as "X-1380". A few months later, Multicultural bought the station back and reinstated the WKDM call sign and the brokered programming policy. Since 2007, WKDM has broadcast in Mandarin Chinese 24 hours a day Monday through Friday, featuring drama, popular music, talk shows, news program, children's programs and sports, as well as programs from China and Taiwan.
