= KMRB (disambiguation) =

KMRB may refer to:

- KMRB, a radio station licensed to San Gabriel, California, United States
- Eastern WV Regional Airport, serving Martinsburg, West Virginia, United States
- Korea Media Rating Board, a South Korean entertainment ratings organisation
