= KGRB =

KGRB may refer to:

- KGRB (FM), a radio station (94.3 FM) licensed to serve Jackson, California, United States
- KALI (AM), a radio station (900 AM) in West Covina, California, United States, which held the call sign KGRB from 1961 to 1996
- KGRB, the ICAO code for Green Bay–Austin Straubel International Airport
- Korea Game Rating Board, the former name of the Game Rating and Administration Committee of South Korea
