= KAZN =

Chinese-language radio station in Pasadena, California

Coordinates: 34°07′08″N 118°04′57.2″W

- Pasadena, California; United States
- Broadcast area: Greater Los Angeles
- Frequency: 1300 kHz
- Branding: KAZN AM 1300 中文廣播電臺

Programming
- Language: Mandarin Chinese

Ownership
- Owner: Multicultural Broadcasting; (Multicultural Radio Broadcasting Licensee, LLC)
- Sister stations: KAHZ, KALI, KALI-FM, KBLA, KMRB

History
- First air date: July 22, 1948
- Former call signs: KAGH (1948–1950); KWKW (1950–1989)
- Call sign meaning: Asian

Technical information
- Licensing authority: FCC
- Facility ID: 51426
- Class: B
- Power: 23,000 watts (day); 4,200 watts (night)
- Repeaters: 1600 KAHZ (Pomona); 106.3 KALI-HD3 (Santa Ana)

Links
- Public license information: Public file; LMS
- Webcast: Listen live
- Website: www.am1300.com

Chinese name
- Traditional Chinese: KAZN AM 1300 中文廣播電臺
- Simplified Chinese: KAZN AM 1300 中文广播电台
- Hanyu Pinyin: KAZN AM 1300 zhōng wén guǎng bō diàn tái

KAZN (1300 AM) is a commercial radio station licensed to Pasadena, California, United States. KAZN serves the Greater Los Angeles area with a Mandarin Chinese language format. The station comes from San Gabriel and the 6 mast array is shared with KMRB on 1430kHz.

The station was founded in 1948 as KAGH. From 1950 to 1989, the station had the KWKW call sign; it had a Spanish format for much of that time, including Spanish language broadcasts of Los Angeles Dodgers games. In 1988, the station was sold to NetworksAmerica; the following year, it converted to a multilingual Asian format in Japanese, Chinese, Korean, Tagalog, and Vietnamese and became KAZN. Beginning in 1993, KAZN broadcast full time in Chinese.

Multicultural Broadcasting has owned KAZN since 1998. KAZN broadcasts talk and entertainment shows geared towards Mandarin speakers in the Los Angeles area. In the Pomona Valley, KAZN is simulcast on KAHZ.

== History ==
=== As KAGH (1948–1950) ===
Founded as KAGH by Rose Bowl Broadcasters, a company headed by attorney Andrew G. Haley, the station signed on the air July 22, 1948 and was first licensed on August 6 that year as a 1,000-watt daytime-only station, with Pasadena its city of license. Broadcasting-Telecasting magazine reported in August 1948 that KAGH had an "emphasis on public service as a community station." KAGH also had an FM station, KAGH-FM, on 98.3 MHz.

In 1949, Rose Bowl Broadcasters sold KAGH to the Southern California Broadcasting Company for $90,000. By December 1949, KAGH was licensed to broadcast at night.

=== As KWKW (1950–1989) ===
On February 16, 1950, KAGH changed its call sign to KWKW.

Around the mid-1950s, KWKW began a full time Spanish format. In 1955, KWKW joined the Sombrero Network. KWKW claimed to have had the first Spanish language broadcast of an American football game when it broadcast a game between Los Angeles State College and the University of Mexico. Beginning in 1958, KWKW broadcast Los Angeles Dodgers games in Spanish right in the team's first season after moving from Brooklyn.

In 1962, KWKW was sold for $1 million to Lotus Theatres, a company owned by Howard Kalmenson. Beginning May 3, 1963, KWKW increased its daytime power to 5,000 watts. KWKW continued its Spanish format upon purchase by Lotus.

In 1988, KWKW was part of a swap where KFAC sold its 1330 AM frequency and transmitter site to Lotus for $8.75 million; Lotus then sold KWKW to NetworksAmerica.

=== As KAZN (1989–present) ===
On January 18, 1989, KWKW officially changed its call sign to KAZN. Co-founded by Dwight Case and George Fritzinger, NetworksAmerica converted KAZN into an Asian ethnic station branded "K-Asian" with programs in Japanese, Chinese, Korean, Tagalog, and Vietnamese. In its first year, KAZN struggled to attract advertisers.

In July 1991, Bang and Edward Kim purchased KAZN for $7.5 million. Also that year, KAZN began broadcasting Los Angeles Dodgers games in Korean.

Beginning in 1993, Edward Kim converted KAZN into an all-Chinese station. On May 19 that year, KAZN carried the first Chinese broadcast of a Dodgers game in the U.S., a 5–2 win over the Cincinnati Reds. KAZN initially broadcast in both Mandarin and Cantonese.

In April 1998, KAZN was purchased by Multicultural Broadcasting for $12 million. Multicultural Broadcasting also reformatted KAZN's programming to be completely in Mandarin and moved the Cantonese programming to KMRB.

In June 2006, Arbitron ratings in Los Angeles and Orange counties found KAZN and KMRB to be the most popular non-English stations in the Los Angeles market.

== Operations and programming ==
Licensed to Pasadena as a Class B AM station, KAZN broadcasts from a six-tower transmitter in unincorporated San Gabriel with 23,000 watts during the daytime and 4,200 watts at night. Its studios are located on Green Street in Pasadena's Playhouse Village.

KAZN's programming schedule consists of news, talk, and music. Among its programs are talk shows Today's Topic (今日話題) and Rush Hour (尖峰時刻). Those shows have attracted local media attention for their discussions of Chinese issues such as the death of Qian Xuesen, the Taiwan independence movement, the Tibetan independence movement, and the 2008 Tibetan unrest.

KAZN simulcasts on KAHZ AM 1600, which is licensed to Pomona and whose signal reaches the Pomona Valley, Orange County, and parts of Riverside County.
