= WJDM (New Jersey) =

Radio station in Elizabeth, New Jersey (1970–2019)

- Elizabeth, New Jersey; United States
- Frequency: 1530 kHz
- Branding: Radio Cantico Nuevo

Ownership
- Owner: Multicultural Broadcasting; (Multicultural Radio Broadcasting Licensee, LLC)

History
- First air date: March 11, 1970
- Last air date: January 30, 2019
- Former call signs: WELA (1969–1971)
- Call sign meaning: John Quinn, Dominick Mirabelli, Michael Quinn, the first names of the station's original owners

Technical information
- Licensing authority: FCC
- Facility ID: 54563
- Class: D
- Power: 1,000 watts (daytime); 670 watts (critical hours)
- Transmitter coordinates: 40°41′25.4″N 74°15′38.5″W
- Translator: 97.5 W248CG (Jersey City)

Links
- Public license information: Public file; LMS

WJDM (1530 AM, "Radio Cantico Nuevo") was a radio station licensed to Elizabeth, New Jersey (the seat of Union County, New Jersey), which last broadcast a Spanish language Christian radio format. The station's transmitter was located in nearby Union Township, Union County, New Jersey.

== History ==
The station signed on the air on March 11, 1970, as WELA with the following jingle: (Drumroll) - Announcer: "You've listened to the rest, now listen to the best!" (Chorus - "W-E-L-A, You never heard it so good!") The original format consisted of music, mainly middle-of-the-road (MOR), adult contemporary and rock 'n roll oldies selections, with local news and information. The station made a name for itself with its coverage of an explosion at the Linden, New Jersey Bayway Refinery just after 11 PM Saturday December 5, 1970, which had area residents fearing for their lives much of the next day.

In order to avoid confusion with WERA Plainfield, New Jersey (1590 kHz), the original call sign was changed in January 1971 to WJDM, with the letters J, D and M standing for the first names of the original owners. (Note: WERA was shut down in 1997 after being acquired by WWRL 1600 kHz New York, New York, to allow extension of that station's coverage to the west.) WJDM later adopted an ethnic format, reflecting the city's changing demographics, that expanded from Sundays to full-time in the 1990s.

=== Expanded Band assignment ===
WJDM's president, John R. Quinn, was frustrated that the station was limited to daytime-only operation, and required to sign-off at night, because it was located within protected nighttime coverage area of a Class I "clear channel" station, WCKY in Cincinnati, Ohio. In addition, there were no unused fulltime assignments available on the AM and FM bands in the congested New York City region.

On June 8, 1988, an International Telecommunication Union-sponsored conference held at Rio de Janeiro, Brazil adopted provisions, effective July 1, 1990, to extend the upper end of the Region 2 (which included the United States) AM broadcast band, by adding ten frequencies for fulltime stations. Quinn saw this as an opportunity for WJDM to move to a new frequency allowing fulltime operation.

Quinn arranged for congressional representative Matthew J. Rinaldo to introduce legislation that added a carefully worded provision to the Communications Act of 1934 in late 1991, mandating that "It shall be the policy of the Federal Communications Commission, in any case in which the licensee of an existing AM daytime-only station located in a community with a population of more than 100,000 persons that lacks a local full-time aural station licensed to that community and that is located within a Class I station primary service area notifies the Commission that such licensee seeks to provide full-time service". This addition successfully advanced WJDM's status, and on December 8, 1995 the station began broadcasting on the additional frequency of 1660 kHz, as the country's first with regular broadcasting on the expanded band.

Initially, the expanded band station carried the same WJDM call letters as its parent station. On March 17, 1997, the FCC completed the process of determining which stations would be permitted to move to expanded band frequencies, and WJDM was included among the eighty-eight selected stations, now formally authorized to move from 1530 to 1660 kHz. A construction permit for the expanded band station was assigned the call letters WBAH on May 11, 1998, which were changed to WWRU on February 15, 1999. WWRU later changed its community of license to Jersey City, New Jersey.

=== Later history ===
The FCC's initial policy was that both the original station and its expanded band counterpart could operate simultaneously for up to five years, after which owners would have to turn in one of the two licenses, depending on whether they preferred the new assignment or elected to remain on the original frequency, although this deadline was extended multiple times. WJDM ceased broadcasting on January 30, 2019, and its license was cancelled April 10, 2020. After the station ceased operations, W248CG became a repeater of WXMC, and then WTHE. WTHE, a station in Mineola, New York, would later take on the WJDM call sign for itself; Cantico Nuevo Ministry, Inc., which provides the Radio Cantico Nuevo programing, owns that station.
