= WHWH =

Coordinates: 40.36675°N 74.74342°W

- Princeton, New Jersey; United States
- Broadcast area: Trenton, New Jersey
- Frequency: 1350 kHz
- Branding: La Unika

Programming
- Language: Spanish
- Format: Christian music

Ownership
- Owner: Multicultural Broadcasting; (Multicultural Radio Broadcasting Licensee, LLC)

History
- First air date: September 7, 1963
- Call sign meaning: founder Herbert W. Hobler

Technical information
- Licensing authority: FCC
- Facility ID: 47426
- Class: B
- Power: 5,000 watts

Links
- Public license information: Public file; LMS
- Website: www.radiowttm1680.com

WHWH (1350 AM) is a radio station in Princeton, New Jersey, serving Trenton, New Jersey. Established in 1963, the station is owned and operated by Multicultural Radio Broadcasting Licensee, LLC.

== History ==
WHWH signed on September 7, 1963. The call letters stand for founder Herbert W. Hobler, a Princeton resident and Princeton University graduate.

One of the first air personalities was Dave Moss, who moved from WKDN in Camden to become the station's first general manager and play-by-play voice of Princeton Tigers sports. (Station owner Hobler served as on air analyst with Moss.) All-American player Bill Bradley led the 1964–65 Princeton Tigers men's basketball team, and Tigers football back Cosmo Iacavazzi starred for the university. The games were live on WHWH. In the mid-1960s, the station grew, and provided extensive community programming from 6.a.m. to midnight. Program director Bob Alexander led a staff of announcers that included Betty Gates, Bob Lawrence, Lou Mitchell, Joe LeRoy, and Stu Ryder. The music was middle of the road. Weekends included Sunday Show Tune Shop, Saturday Night Hootenanny, and your Dance Party (big band).

Weekday mornings, local news was reported by Larry Grauman and John Davison. Each evening, Ed Ray covered the meetings of town councils, school boards, and zoning boards. News director Dick Standish aired news during the day, covered politics and the statehouse. He produced an hour-long documentary on the New Jersey Pine Barrens and the people who live there. This show won the New Jersey Broadcasters Association's 1965 award for Imaginative and Effective Public Service programming. This was the first of a string of salutes earned by station staffers. The extensive hometown coverage continued under news director Gene Dillard. University sports leaders — including football coach Jake McCandless — wrote and aired an 8:05 a.m. sports summary. A local church service was broadcast live each Sunday morning. The YMCA had a regular weekly show. Boy Scout activities were reported every Saturday morning. Local businesses reached potential customers with commercials. Major speeches in the community and at the university were taped or carried live. The station was live from the state fair, and many other special events. This pattern of extensive local involvement continued in the 1970s. From October of 1971 to December of 1975 Lewis Edge was Station Manager and then General manager. After he left to start a business of his own, he returned in 1979 to become the General Manager of Nassau Broadcasting's Broadcast Division. He left the company in December of 1981 when Nassau Broadcasting was sold.

Others of note on WHWH were Guy Hutchinson, Chris Canali, Betty Gates, Stu Ryder and news directors Bill Schirmann and Phil Painter. Other notables from WHWH included NBC television news reporter Judy Muller who "honed her skills" there in the 1970s. On-air personality Howard David left the station to find success at ESPN and the comedic Bill Bircher took over mornings for many years. Wayne Cabot joined the staff in 1982 on his way to WCBS in New York. Jack Speer also worked at the station in 1987, before moving on to Washington to eventually become the hourly newscaster for All Things Considered on NPR.

The station had its own promotional staff directed by Hal Stein and during the 1970s and into the 1980s, the station won many national radio advertising awards because of their production and copy chiefs, respectively John Anastasio and Jack Shuster. While the only station at the time with its own production and marketing department Anastasio and Shuster were incredibly talented, securing RAB and CLEO awards, and coaching other young writer and voice talents such as E.B. Moss, who joined the station some 10 years after her father, Dave, had moved on to WFAS then WKTU in New York. Owner Herb Hobler hired Johnny Morris as sales manager who then rose to head up the successful station. (Morris left the company after over 20 years in the late 1990s, acquiring WIMG in Trenton.)

Like many other mass-appeal AM stations, WHWH eventually found it difficult to compete with FM band stations. In the 1990s and 2000s the station tried adult standards and business news formats with little success.

=== Expanded Band assignment ===
On March 17, 1997, the Federal Communications Commission (FCC) announced that 88 stations had been given permission to move to newly available "Expanded Band" transmitting frequencies, ranging from 1610 to 1700 kHz, with WHWH authorized to move from 1350 to 1680 kHz.

A construction permit for the expanded band station was assigned the call letters WAXK (now WTTM) on March 6, 1998. The FCC's initial policy was that both the original station and its expanded band counterpart could operate simultaneously for up to five years, after which owners would have to turn in one of the two licenses, depending on whether they preferred the new assignment or elected to remain on the original frequency. As a result, WHWH went off the air on Friday, April 7, 2006, at midnight. However, WHWH was allowed to return to the air in May 2007 after the FCC relaxed the rule, and both stations have remained authorized, with the expanded band station, as WTTM, moving from Princeton to Lindenwold, New Jersey, a part of the Philadelphia market. One restriction is that the FCC has generally required paired original and expanded band stations to remain under common ownership.

=== Later history ===
For an extended period after its revival, WHWH operated noncommercially except for some brokered local sports programming. Most of its hours were devoted to "Radio T.E.D.", an automated blend of country, oldies, smooth jazz, standards and Christmas music devised by the station's chief engineer, Neal Newman. During the first half of 2010 WHWH simulcast Levittown, Pennsylvania, station WBCB. In 2011 WHWH began a Spanish Christian music format called "La Unika", and in March 2012 resumed broadcasting in C-Quam AM Stereo.
