= KMRB =

Radio station in Pasadena, California

Coordinates: 34°07′08″N 118°04′57.2″W

- San Gabriel, California; United States
- Broadcast area: Greater Los Angeles
- Frequency: 1430 kHz
- Branding: KMRB AM 1430 粵語廣播電臺

Programming
- Language: Chinese
- Format: Cantonese talk and music

Ownership
- Owner: Multicultural Broadcasting; (Multicultural Radio Broadcasting Licensee, LLC)
- Sister stations: KAHZ, KALI, KALI-FM, KAZN, KBLA

History
- First air date: August 1, 1942
- Former call signs: KWKW (1942–1950); KALI (1950–1999)
- Call sign meaning: Multicultural Radio Broadcasting

Technical information
- Licensing authority: FCC
- Facility ID: 52913
- Class: B
- Power: 50,000 watts (day); 9,800 watts (night)

Links
- Public license information: Public file; LMS
- Webcast: Listen live
- Website: www.am1430.net

Chinese name
- Traditional Chinese: KMRB AM 1430 粵語廣播電臺
- Simplified Chinese: KMRB AM 1430 粤语广播电台
- Hanyu Pinyin: KMRB AM 1430 Yuèyǔ guǎngbò diàntái
- Jyutping: KMRB AM 1430 Jyut^{6}jyu^{5} gwong^{2}bo^{3} din^{6}toi^{4}

KMRB (1430 AM) is a broadcast radio station in the United States. Licensed to San Gabriel, California, KMRB serves the Greater Los Angeles area with a Cantonese language format. It is owned and operated by Multicultural Broadcasting.

The station originally signed on in 1942 as KWKW. From 1950 to 1999, the station had call sign KALI; it launched a Spanish format in the late 1950s. In 1994, Multicultural Broadcasting purchased KALI and converted it to its present Chinese format.

== History ==
=== As KWKW (1942–1950) ===
The Southern California Broadcasting Company, headed by president Marshall S. Neal, obtained call sign KWKW on August 22, 1941 for a station to be licensed in Pasadena, California. In July 1942, Southern California Broadcasting announced plans to start broadcasting KWKW on August 1 with a community format focusing on business, culture, and civics in Pasadena. KWKW was first licensed September 30, 1942 as a 1,000 watt daytime only station.

In 1945, KWKW broadcast Pacific Coast Professional Football League games. KWKW also sponsored a "Miss KWKW" beauty pageant. Some KWKW programs were in foreign languages, including Greek, Hebrew, Japanese, Portuguese, and Spanish.

On January 18, 1950, John H. Poole purchased KWKW for $57,500.

=== As KALI (1950–1999) ===
Nearly a month after its purchase by John H. Poole, KWKW became KALI on February 16, 1950. In November 1951, Poole sold KALI to the Consolidated Broadcasting Company for $37,700 plus 85 percent of accounts receivable.

Tele-Broadcasters Inc. purchased KALI for nearly $300,000 in December 1956.

On June 3, 1959, KALI officially increased its power to 5,000 watts and began broadcasting at night; its city of license changed to San Gabriel. By the late 1950s, KALI had over 100 hours a week of Spanish language programming and 55 hours a week of programming geared towards black listeners. By 1960, KALI broadcast full time in Spanish.

In April 1966, United Broadcasting Company purchased Tele-Broadcasters and its four TV and radio stations including KALI for a total $1.9 million.

KALI had the brand "Radio Variedades" in the 1980s, featuring music ranging from contemporary Latin pop such as Daniela Romo to oldies from the 1940s. In addition, KALI broadcast live Spanish translations of KNBC's 11 p.m. news. Following the 1985 Mexico City earthquake KALI held an on-air disaster relief fundraiser.

The Los Angeles Times reported in 1991 that residents of Sunnyslope, a neighborhood located near KALI's transmitter, were receiving KALI's signal from televisions, ovens, and other household appliances.

In 1994, Multicultural Broadcasting purchased KALI and changed it to a Chinese format, with programs in both Mandarin and Cantonese. By 1998, Multicultural Broadcasting purchased another local station, KAZN. It moved the Mandarin programming to KAZN and made KMRB an all-Cantonese station.

=== As KMRB (1999–present) ===
On June 10, 1999, KALI changed its call sign to KMRB.

In June 2006, Arbitron ratings in Los Angeles and Orange counties found KAZN and KMRB to be the most popular non-English stations in the Los Angeles market.
