= WIMG =

Coordinates: 40°17′16.4″N 74°52′21.6″W

- Ewing, New Jersey; United States
- Broadcast area: Trenton, New Jersey
- Frequency: 1300 kHz

Programming
- Format: Gospel

Ownership
- Owner: Morris Broadcasting Company of New Jersey, Inc.

History
- First air date: December 4, 1922
- Last air date: May 2025
- Former call signs: WOAX (1922–1933); WTNJ (1933–1959); WAAT (1959–1971); WTNJ (1971–1979)
- Former frequencies: 360 meters (1922–1923); 1250 kHz (1923–1928); 1280 kHz (1928–1941); 1310 kHz (1941–1949)
- Call sign meaning: Imagination

Technical information
- Licensing authority: FCC
- Facility ID: 14635
- Class: B
- Power: 3,200 watts (day); 1,300 watts (night)

Links
- Public license information: Public file; LMS
- Website: wimg1300.com

WIMG (1300 AM) was a radio station broadcasting a gospel music format. Licensed to Ewing, New Jersey, the station was owned by Morris Broadcasting Company of New Jersey, Inc. Established in 1922 as WOAX, it was the oldest radio station in New Jersey at the time its license was canceled in 2026.

== History ==
WIMG was the oldest radio station in New Jersey. On December 1, 1921, the U.S. Department of Commerce, which regulated radio at this time, adopted the first regulations formally establishing a broadcasting station category, which set aside the wavelength of 360 meters (833 kHz) for entertainment broadcasts, and 485 meters (619 kHz) for market and weather reports. The station was originally licensed to the 360 "entertainment" wavelength on December 4, 1922, as WOAX, to Franklyn J. Wolff (Monument Pottery Company) in Trenton, New Jersey. The original call sign was randomly assigned from a roster of available call signs.

In May 1923, the station was reassigned to 1250 kHz. On November 11, 1928, as part of a major reallocation implemented under the Federal Radio Commission's General Order 40, WOAX was assigned to 1280 kHz, sharing time on that frequency with WCAM in Camden and WCAP in Asbury Park.

The WOAX license was transferred to WOAX, Incorporated, on July 11, 1930. Beginning that year, WOAX was associated with, and carried some of the broadcasts, of WHAP in New York City, a controversial station run by a dissident faction of Christian Science that was aggressively anti-Catholic. At the time Franklin Ford, president of the defenders society, stated that the two stations were the first in a projected national network. However, this ambitious plan was never realized, and in 1932 Ford arranged for WHAP to be sold.

WOAX's call sign was changed to WTNJ on April 1, 1933. In March 1941, WTNJ and its two timeshare partners moved to 1310, with the implementation of the North American Regional Broadcasting Agreement. By 1942, WOAX, Inc.–which remained the name of WTNJ's licensee–was owned one-third each by Charles E. Loew, Julie V. Loew, and F. J. Wolff. On January 22, 1949, the three-way time share was unwound: WCAM and WCAP began full-time operation on 1310 kHz, and WTNJ was moved to 1300 kHz and limited to only broadcasting during daytime hours.

WTNJ nearly lost its license on December 20, 1950, when the Federal Communications Commission (FCC) moved to revoke the station's license effective January 10, 1951, on the grounds that the Loews had delegated control of the station to Erling C. Olsen without prior approval; in its 1948 renewal proceeding, the FCC had found that Franklyn J. Wolff had similarly been delegated operational responsibility by the Loews, leading to a warning against a return to similar practices. On September 4, 1952, the FCC rescinded the revocation, finding that Olsen had "only acted as the lawfully designated agent" of the Loews and that he was legitimately serving as WOAX Inc.'s vice president, treasurer, and director; on September 25, it granted a concurrently-pending application, filed on August 5, 1950, to formally transfer control to Olsen.

WOAX Inc. sold WTNJ to the Delaware Valley Broadcasting Company–controlled by Edward L. Cossman, Joseph Schoenholz, and Kalman Prusli–for $200,000 in 1959. The new owners changed the call sign to WAAT effective August 13, 1959. WAAT operated with Top 40, country and middle-of-the-road formats at various times. The WTNJ call sign returned on March 13, 1971, and a year later the station moved to a soul music format. Delaware Valley Broadcasting sold WTNJ to Herbert and Jeanne Greenberg's Marketing Survey and Research Corp. for $295,375 in 1973.

On October 13, 1979, the station became WIMG ("Imagination Radio") with a format featuring old-time radio programming. This policy was short-lived, and R&B and adult contemporary formats were tried in later years. In the 1980s WIMG was granted a license to operate full-time; its community of license was changed to Ewing as part of that process.

The Greenbergs' Progressive Communications (Note: The corporate name had been changed in August 1973.) sold WIMG to L.E. Willis' Crusade Broadcasting Corp. in a $425,000 transaction announced in October 1982 and approved by the FCC on March 9, 1983. The station would join WPCE in Portsmouth, Virginia; WOWI in Norfolk, Virginia; WGOE in Richmond, Virginia; and WKUE in Green Cove Springs, Florida, in Willis' broadcast group. By 1991, when Willis Broadcasting filed to transfer many of its stations to Willis Family Broadcasting in a series of transactions totaling $9.45 million–with WIMG valued at $750,000–the station was programming gospel music. Crusade Broadcasting sold the station to Morris Broadcasting Company of New Jersey for $450,000 in 1993; principal John Morris was previously associated with Nassau Broadcasting and its Trenton–Princeton stations WHWH and WPST, with other interests held by Michael, Louise, and Margaret Morris.

The FCC began initiating proceedings to revoke the WIMG license in March 2025, as the station owed over $18,500 in unpaid fees dating to 2021. The following month, WIMG lost its lease on its Crown Castle-owned towers; despite this, the station was heard transmitting an open carrier without special temporary authority in May 2025. An FCC inspection that month found that WIMG had reduced power to 900 watts without authorization, its tower lighting was not properly placed or operational (an issue not fully corrected in a subsequent inspection that August), and its Emergency Alert System equipment was not running. By April 2026, WIMG was silent, leading the FCC to issue an inquiry regarding the station's status; Morris Broadcasting did not respond, and the FCC cancelled the station’s license on July 30, 2026.
