= WTTM =

- Lindenwold, New Jersey; United States
- Broadcast area: Philadelphia metropolitan area
- Frequency: 1680 kHz
- Branding: La Unika (The Unique)

Programming
- Language: Spanish
- Format: Latin music–Spanish talk radio
- Affiliations: TUDN Radio

Ownership
- Owner: Multicultural Broadcasting; (Multicultural Radio Broadcasting Licensee, LLC)

History
- First air date: May 1999
- Former call signs: WAXK (1998)
- Call sign meaning: "World Takes, Trenton Makes" (variation of the slogan on the Lower Trenton Bridge)

Technical information
- Licensing authority: FCC
- Facility ID: 87111
- Class: B
- Power: 10,000 watts (day); 1,000 watts (night)
- Transmitter coordinates: 39°53′16″N 75°0′4″W

Links
- Public license information: Public file; LMS
- Website: www.radiowttm1680.com

WTTM (1680 AM) is a radio station broadcasting a Latin music and Spanish-language talk format to the Philadelphia metropolitan area. The station has its studios and offices in Philadelphia and its transmitter site in Cherry Hill, New Jersey. The station is owned by Multicultural Radio Broadcasting, Inc and licensed to Multicultural Radio Broadcasting Licensee, LLC.

== History ==
WTTM originated as the expanded band "twin" of an existing station on the standard AM band.

On March 17, 1997, the Federal Communications Commission (FCC) announced that 88 stations had been given permission to move to newly available "Expanded Band" transmitting frequencies, ranging from 1610 to 1700 kHz, with WHWH in Princeton, New Jersey, authorized to move from 1350 to 1680 kHz. A construction permit for the expanded band station was assigned the call letters WAXK on March 6, 1998, although the call sign was changed to WTTM twenty days later, adopting call letters that had just been removed from its longtime home on 920 AM in Trenton, New Jersey.

The FCC's initial policy was that both the original station and its expanded band counterpart could operate simultaneously for up to five years, after which owners would have to turn in one of the two licenses, depending on whether they preferred the new assignment or elected to remain on the original frequency. As a result WHWH went off the air on Friday, April 7, 2006, at midnight. However, WHWH was allowed to return to the air in May 2007 after the FCC relaxed the rule, and both stations have remained authorized. One restriction is that the FCC has generally required paired original and expanded band stations to remain under common ownership.

The new WTTM reached the air in May 1999, with a sports radio format, mostly broadcasting programming from ESPN Radio. In 2002, the station was sold from Nassau Broadcasting to Multicultural Radio Broadcasting Inc. MRBI leased the station to EBC Radio to program the station with a South Asian Indian format. The lease arrangement ended in 2005, and shortly thereafter the station's city of license was relocated from Princeton to Lindenwold, moving it into the Philadelphia radio market.

WTTM began carrying ESPN Deportes Radio during the nighttime hours on April 1, 2019, the network's programming was provided to the station by Spanish Sports Productions, who also produces WTTM's Spanish-language Philadelphia Phillies and Eagles broadcasts. The launch came two months before ESPN announced on June 11, 2019, that ESPN Deportes Radio would cease operations on September 8. After ESPN Deportes Radio was discontinued on September 8, 2019, the station became an affiliate of TUDN Radio.
