= Language and overseas Chinese communities =

The usage of the Chinese language by the Chinese diaspora and their descendants has been determined by a large number of factors, including their ancestry, their migrant ancestors' "regime of origin", assimilation through generational changes, and official policies of their country of residence. The general trend is that more established Chinese populations in the Western world and in many regions of Asia have Cantonese as either the dominant variety or as a common community vernacular, while Mandarin is much more prevalent among new arrivals, making it increasingly common in many Chinatowns, though still not dominant.

== Europe ==
The Chinese diaspora in Europe is diverse and speaks different Chinese varieties depending on their place of origin. Similar to other continents, there is an overall shift from Cantonese as the most spoken language by earlier migrants to Standard Mandarin as the lingua franca in the present day. The establishment of Chinese language schools in Europe helps newer overseas generations learn Mandarin as a heritage language, overlooking other Chinese varieties that are lower in status. Despite extra education, younger generations are often not fluent in Mandarin. However, they still show multilingual skills in code-switching with peers or when functioning as language brokers for their parents.

=== Chinese language education in Europe ===
Because children of the Chinese diaspora in Europe are mainly surrounded by the languages of their host countries, most acquire Chinese as a second language. To pass their heritage language onto their children, Chinese migrants all over Europe have set up Chinese language schools throughout the years. These schools are also called Chinese weekend schools, because students attend these schools in the weekend when regular schools are closed.

Before the 1950s, there were attempts to set up language schools, but they were all short-lived and discontinued not long after. The first language school was set up 1919 in Leiden in the Netherlands by Peranakan Chinese students. Later, there were attempts to open schools in Paris, London, Rotterdam, and Berlin, but none of the schools lasted. Between the 1960s and the 1980s, when the Chinese population in Europe was growing due to migration waves from Hong Kong, many schools were established in major countries of Europe. After bringing their families, migrants had formed small communities. To pass on their heritage language to the children that grew up in Europe, they set up weekend schools. These schools were mainly teaching Cantonese, as most migrants came from Hong Kong.

After the 1990s, migrants came to Europe from all over China and the language schools grew rapidly. In contrast to earlier language education, schools shifted to teaching Standard Mandarin instead of Cantonese and simplified characters instead of traditional characters. During the COVID-19 pandemic, language schools faced the loss of students. Some schools did not survive the pandemic, but others adapted through a hybrid form of teaching, providing online education.

=== Language status of varieties ===
As the demographic of the Chinese diaspora changed throughout the years, the languages of the Chinese population in Europe also changed. Whereas Cantonese used to be the main language spoken by earlier migrants, Standard Mandarin has since then become the lingua franca of Chinese migrants. This is promoted even further by the teaching of Mandarin in language schools. Some fear that the status of Mandarin might lead to tensions between speakers of different varieties within the Chinese community. Other varieties are often overlooked in these communities and have a lower status than Mandarin. There is also a hierarchy between varieties. Where Mandarin carries a higher status than Cantonese, Cantonese has a higher status than other varieties. This is reflected in the education choice of language schools, where there is a high demand for learning Mandarin, but not for other varieties.

In the United Kingdom, because of its colonial past in Hong Kong, there is less of a tendency to accept Mandarin as the lingua franca. Instead, Mandarin is used alongside Cantonese and English, all for different purposes.

=== Multilingualism and language contact ===
Local languages are also used by the Chinese diaspora. In the Netherlands, second generations mainly use Dutch as a way to communicate within the community. Despite not always being fluent in Mandarin, many overseas Chinese from younger generations identify themselves as "multilingual and multicultural Chinese transnationals". They often show creative use of code-switching and word play between languages when speaking with their peers. Their code-switching defies grammatical constraints of the two languages and goes across morphological and syntactic boundaries, showing their competency of both languages.

Another way that children from overseas Chinese show their multilingual competencies is in their role as language brokers. Parents that struggle with understanding the language of their host country often need help with translation of certain documents or need a language mediator in certain situations. These situations include school meetings, but also doctor appointments and interaction with government officials. This role that is put upon multilingual children in overseas communities can be demanding and comes with responsibility and possible stress. On the other hand, it also can help increase their competence of both languages and their vocabulary.

== East Asia ==
Within East Asia, Min Chinese (Hokkien, Fuzhounese, etc.), Yue Chinese (Cantonese, Taishanese, Wu-Hua, etc.), Hakka Chinese, Wu Chinese, Mandarin dialects to some extent nowadays and Standard Mandarin have served as the lingua francas amongst ethnic Chinese across most of the region and within many of its nations. However, the language situation of these communities can vary greatly amongst neighboring nations or even within.

=== Japan ===
Mainly speaking Japanese and Chinese. Generally speaking Standard Mandarin can be used. Common Chinese dialects include Mandarin dialects, Min Chinese (Hokkien and Fuzhounese), Hakka Chinese, Wu Chinese and Cantonese.

==== Ryukyu ====
In the Ryukyu Kingdom Periods was once spoken Fuzhou Mandarin, additionally, maybe it's possible that they once used in Min Chinese (Fuzhounese and Hokkien) and Wu Chinese as well. In modern times, during the Japanese and American colonial period, Japanese was the main language, some immigrants and their descendants from Japanese-ruled Taiwan (mainly in Yaeyama and other southern Ryukyu Islands) maybe also speak Taiwanese Hokkien.

=== Korea Peninsula ===
In the Korean Peninsula, most Chinese have received Chinese education in Chinese Schools, so almost all of them can use Chinese, and Korean and Standard Chinese are the main communication languages in formal occasions. However, because many Korean Chinese (Hwagyo) have their ancestral roots from Shandong, Northeast China, Jiangsu, Shanghai, Zhejiang, they can also sometimes use Mandarin dialects (Jiaoliao Mandarin, Northeastern Mandarin, Jilu Mandarin), Wu Chinese and Other Chinese dialects.

=== Mongolia ===
In Ulaanbaatar, because most Chinese people have received Chinese education in Chinese Schools (mainly China-Mongolia Friendship School), they can generally speak Chinese and a few can speak Mongolian. In formal occasions, people mainly communicate in Standard Chinese. However, because Many Mongolian Chinese have their ancestral roots in Hebei, Shanxi and Inner Mongolia, they sometimes use Chinese dialects such as Jin Chinese, Jilu Mandarin, Northeastern Mandarin, etc.

== Southeast Asia ==
Origin cities and languages of Southeast Asian Chinese

=== Indonesia ===
Ethnic Chinese in Indonesia had been subjected for decades to official, and at times discriminatory, assimilation policies. As a result, a large number are no longer proficient in Chinese. Most Chinese Indonesians speak Bahasa Indonesia even with their own families. Originally, the majority of the population emigrated from Fujian, Guangdong and Guangxi provinces in Southern China, with the first wave of arrivals preceding the Dutch colonial period in the 1700s. The four recognized varieties of Chinese spoken by the Chinese Indonesian community are, ordered by number of speakers: Hokkien, Hakka, Mandarin and Cantonese. Additionally, Teochew and Puxian Min are also found. Taiwanese Overseas Community Affairs Council in 2014 reported more than 8 million self-identified ethnic Chinese: 1.25 percent of the country's population.[1] However other source stated that there are about 10 to 12 million Chinese living in the nation, making up 5-6% of Indonesia population. Most of the Chinese resided in big cities and towns around east coast of Sumatra, north coast of Java and west coast of Kalimantan.

The distribution of Chinese varieties are scattered throughout the archipelago. On North Sumatra, Riau, Riau Islands and Jambi, two varieties of Hokkien exist, Medan Hokkien and Riau Hokkien, which incorporate local and Indonesian vocabulary. Hakka is concentrated in Bangka-Belitung, South Sumatra, Jakarta and West Kalimantan where they form a significant part of the local population. Meanwhile, Pontianak to Ketapang, Kendawangan on the southern tip of West Kalimantan is populated by Teochew speakers. Cantonese and, more recently, Mandarin have been used in Chinese-language schools and both variants are found in major cities such as Jakarta, Medan, Batam and Surabaya, with Mandarin usage increasing with recent arrivals from China (especially in the North China and Taiwan), as well as Cantonese speakers originating from Guangdong, Guangxi, Hong Kong and Macau. Younger generations of Indonesian Chinese are generally fluent in Standard Indonesian, with some being fluent in English, local Chinese languages and even local native Austronesian languages (Javanese, Sundanese, etc.). Meanwhile, the older generations are only fluent in their native Chinese languages and Indonesian.

=== Singapore ===
Singapore has an ethnic Chinese majority population, with Mandarin recognized as one of its official languages. The Singaporean Chinese community do not consider themselves as 'overseas Chinese' but rather as 'Singaporean Chinese', with an emphasis on their national identification and distinct culture. Furthermore, simplified Chinese characters are used in contrast to other overseas Chinese communities, which almost exclusively use traditional Chinese characters. Although the majority of ethnic Chinese in Singapore are predominantly of Hokkien descent and Hokkien has historically been the most spoken Chinese variety, the government of Singapore discourages the usage of non-Mandarin Chinese varieties through the Speak Mandarin Campaign (SMC). The Singaporean government also actively promotes English as the common language of the multiracial society of Singapore, with younger Chinese Singaporeans being mostly bilingual in Mandarin and English, while the older generations speak other Chinese varieties.

Under the SMC policy, all nationally produced non-Mandarin Chinese TV and radio programs were stopped after 1979. Additionally, Hong Kong (Cantonese) and Taiwanese (Hokkien) dramas are unavailable in their original languages on non-cable TV. Nevertheless, since the government restriction on non-Mandarin media was relaxed in the mid-1990s, these media have become available once on again on cable TV and sold in stores. However, only Cantonese seems to have benefited from this uplift, thanks to a large following of Hong Kong popular culture, such as television dramas, cinema and Cantopop.

=== Brunei ===
The Chinese community makes up approximately 12% of the country's total population, the fourth largest concentration of overseas Chinese in the world. Chinese immigrants who have settled here mostly come from the Southern parts of China, notably regions associated with the Min language group. A distinct culture has developed with many Chinese people speaking in a mix three languages - Malay as required in primary to secondary education, English as required in all educational and professional contexts and Chinese as an important part of identity. This spoken mix of Chinese, English and Malay is comparably similar to the Singlish spoken by Singaporeans and other forms of creolic English spoken by Malaysia.

In terms of dialects, a number of Chinese variants are spoken in Brunei such as Hokkien, Hakka, Mandarin, Foochow and Cantonese. Notably, the Chinese community in the capital city of Bandar Seri Begawan mostly speaks Hokkien and Mandarin. Chinese migrants who speak a dialect can also be found to have been clustered in early settlements.

The Chinese community has also set up Chinese schools where proper Mandarin is instructed. While many of the older generation may read and write Traditional Chinese, the modern generation reads and writes Simplified Chinese. Mandarin is the lingua franca in the Chinese community in Brunei. Arguably, English is also a common medium of communication but to a lesser extent.

Associations of Chinese people who speak the same dialect can be found such as the Hainan Association and Foochow Association among many others. However, these associations seem to be losing membership and many dialects are perceived to be dying as Mandarin becomes more common and English gains even more importance.

=== Malaysia ===
Malaysia is the only country besides mainland China and Taiwan that has a complete Chinese education system, from primary schools to universities. Malaysian Chinese speak a wide variety of variants, which are concentrated around particular population centers. Hokkien, the largest Chinese group, is concentrated in Penang, Klang, Kelantan and Malacca, with Penang having its own Hokkien variety. Cantonese is centered on Kuala Lumpur, Seremban, Kuantan and Ipoh, with Hakka minorities also scattered in some states. Meanwhile, in East Malaysia (Malaysian Borneo), Southern Min (Hokkien and Teochew), Hakka, Cantonese, and Mandarin are found except in Sibu, where Fuzhounese (a language of Eastern Min) is predominant, and in Sabah's Sandakan town, where Cantonese and Hakka are both widely spoken.

Regardless of location, however, younger generations are educated in the Malaysian standard of Mandarin at Chinese-language schools. Also, most Chinese Malaysians are able to speak both Malay (the national language) and English, which is widely used in business and at tertiary level. However, usage of native Chinese dialects amongst Chinese Malaysians have been in decline primarily due to lack of intergenerational transmission.

=== Myanmar ===
Although the Burmese Chinese (or Chinese Burmese) officially make up three percent of the population, the actual figure is believed to be much higher. Among the under-counted Chinese populations are: those of mixed background; those that have registered themselves as ethnic Bamar to escape discrimination; illegal Chinese immigrants that have flooded Upper Burma since the 1990s (up to 2 million by some estimates) but are not counted due to the lack of reliable census taking.

The Burmese Chinese dominate the Burmese economy today. They also have a very large presence in Burmese higher education, and make up a high percentage of the educated class in Burma. Most Burmese Chinese speak Burmese as their parent tongue. Those with higher education also speak Mandarin and/or English. The use of non-Mandarin Chinese varieties still prevails. Hokkien (a Southern Min dialect) is mostly used in Yangon as well as in Lower Burma, while Taishanese (a Yue language akin to Cantonese) and Yunnanese Mandarin are well preserved in Upper Burma.

=== Vietnam ===
Ethnic Chinese in Vietnam are categorized into three groups that are based on migrant history, location and level of integration. The largest group is the Hoa, numbering almost a million individuals and have historically been influential in Vietnamese society and economy. They are largely concentrated in major cities of the former South Vietnam (especially in Ho Chi Minh City) and largely speak Cantonese, with Teochew being found among a significant minority.

The two smaller Chinese-speaking groups consist of the San Diu and Ngái. The San Diu number over 100,000 and are concentrated in the mountains of northern Vietnam. They actually trace their origins to Yao people rather than Han Chinese, but nevertheless have been heavily influenced by Chinese culture and speak a variant of Cantonese. Meanwhile, the Ngái are concentrated in rural areas of northern and central Vietnam and number around 1,000. They speak Hakka natively and use Cantonese to communicate with Hoa communities.

=== Cambodia ===
A 2013 census estimated there to be 15,000 ethnic Chinese in Cambodia. However, Chinese community organizations have estimated that up to around 7% of the population may have Chinese ancestry. Chinese Cambodians have historically played important economic and political roles in the country and are still often overrepresented in Cambodian commerce.

As a vast majority of the group emigrated from Cambodia following the Khmer Rouge, the community has assimilated greatly into Cambodian society and many now speak Khmer as their main language. Over three-fourths of Chinese Cambodians belong to the Teochew group, which is also the most commonly spoken Chinese variety. The other two largest groups include Hokkien and Hainanese. Cantonese formed the largest group from the 17th to the mid-20th century, but form only a minority today and are concentrated in major urban centers, especially in the capital city of Phnom Penh. Nevertheless, Cantonese continues to serve as the common community language among most Chinese Cambodians. In Chinese-language schools, either Cantonese and Mandarin are taught, depending on which school.

=== Laos ===
Among the small ethnic Chinese community of Laos, Teochew and Cantonese are the two most spoken Chinese varieties. Ethnic Chinese living on the border with China speak Southwestern Mandarin.

=== Thailand ===
Although Thailand is home to the largest Overseas Chinese community in the world, the level of assimilation is also the highest and most Thai Chinese today speak Thai as their native or main language. Most ethnic Chinese live in major cities such as Bangkok, Chiang Mai, Phuket, Chumphon, Ratchaburi, Chon Buri, Hat Yai and Nakhon Sawan, with Chinatowns in these cities still featuring signage in both Chinese and Thai. As of the 2000s, only a little over 2% (200,000) of Thai Chinese still speak a variant of Chinese at home. A little over half speak Teochew, the largest variant group, followed by Hakka, Hokkien, Hainanese, Cantonese and Shanghainese. In commerce, Teochew, Cantonese and Thai are used as common languages and Chinese-language schools often use Cantonese as the medium of instruction due to its lingua franca status among most ethnic Chinese in Southeast Asia.

=== Philippines ===
Chinese Filipinos officially comprise 1.5% of the country's population, although demographic surveys from third parties find that 18-27% of the Philippine population have at least some Chinese ancestry, totalling up to 27 million people.

Most Chinese Filipinos are at least trilingual, speaking at least one Chinese variant, English, and Filipino (Tagalog), plus potentially one or more other Philippine languages. Older Chinese Filipinos generally prefer to use a Chinese variant, whereas younger generations prefer to use English or any native Philippine language, a result of the strong prohibition of Chinese-language education enacted during the martial law dictatorship of President Marcos (1972–1986). The most widely-spoken Chinese variety is Hokkien, specifically a branched-off local variant of it called Philippine Hokkien. Other Chinese varieties such as Cantonese, Taishanese, Teochew, Hakka, and Shanghainese are also spoken, albeit by a much smaller percentage of the population. In contrast to many of the other Chinese communities in Southeast Asia, the Chinese community of the Philippines does not use Cantonese as its preferred community language or as a principal lingua franca but rather Philippine Hokkien, which is spoken informally at schools and in business among Chinese Filipinos. The most common Philippine languages in the community are Filipino (Tagalog) and the Visayan languages (e.g. Cebuano, Hiligaynon, Waray, etc.) but Ilocano, Pangasinan, Bikol, Chavacano, and Kapampangan are also spoken. As part of a recent trend, partly due to increased contact with other overseas Chinese in Hong Kong and Singapore, more Chinese Filipino families are now opting to use English as their first language at home. There is also a trend among some young Chinese Filipinos to relearn Hokkien, a result of increasing pride in being "ethnic Chinese" and the popularity of Taiwanese films and shows, which is associated with the rise of China in the 21st century.

In Chinese-language schools, a Philippine standard of Mandarin is taught, although most Chinese Filipinos do not speak it at home and do not attain in it the same level of fluency as Chinese people in China, Taiwan, Singapore, Malaysia, and other overseas communities. Due to extensive, albeit informal, contacts with the Ministry of Education of Taiwan (ROC) from 1950 to 1990, the traditional Chinese script as well as Zhuyin are still used, although these have gradually been eased out in favor of simplified Chinese characters and pinyin starting in 2005, with Chinese-language textbooks increasingly imported from mainland China and Singapore.

Despite the perceived widespread assimilation of Chinese Filipinos into the general Philippine population, most still form part of a "Tsinoy" community where Chinese culture is celebrated and practiced. Although not all Chinese Filipinos can fluently speak Hokkien or any other Chinese variant, most can still understand Hokkien to some degree. On the other hand, most Chinese Mestizos (called chhut-si-ia in Hokkien), or those who are of mixed Chinese and Filipino, Spanish, and/or American ancestry, tend to downplay their Chinese roots and invariably consider themselves solely Filipino. Most of these Chinese Mestizos exclusively speak one or more local Philippine languages and/or English.

== North America ==
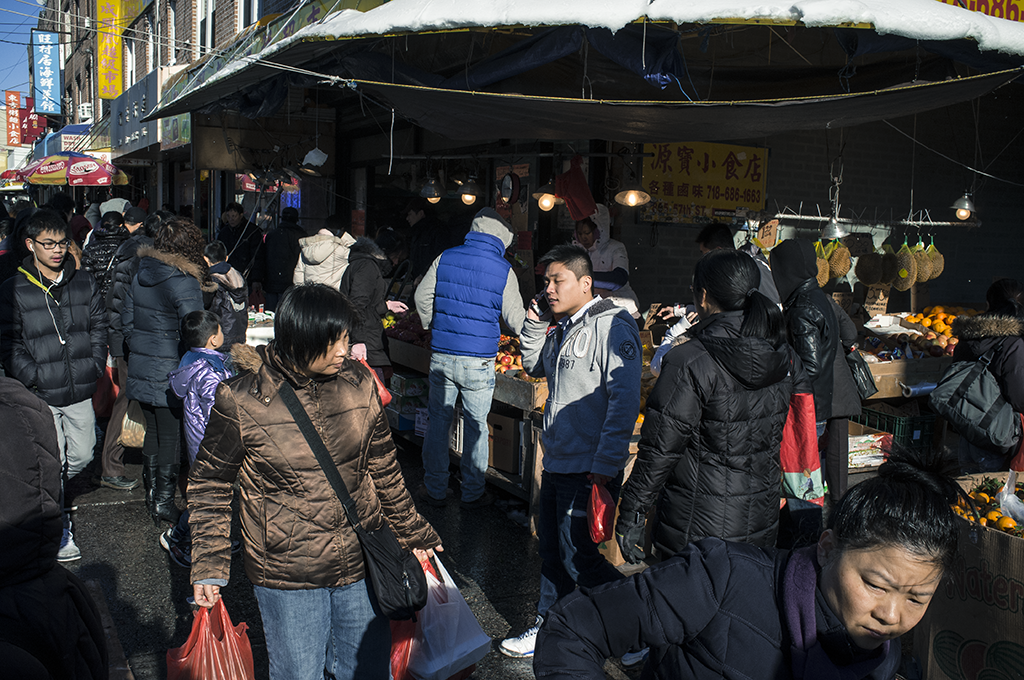
Typical grocery store on 8th Avenue in one of the Brooklyn Chinatowns (布鲁克林華埠) on Long Island, New York, US. Multiple Chinatowns in Manhattan (紐約華埠), Queens (法拉盛華埠), and Brooklyn are thriving as traditionally urban enclaves, as large-scale Chinese immigration continues into New York, with the largest metropolitan Chinese population outside Asia.

Many overseas Chinese populations in North America speak some variety of Chinese. In the United States and Canada, Chinese is the third most spoken language. Yue dialects have historically been the most prevalent forms of Chinese due to immigrants being mostly from southern China from the 19th century up through the 1980s. However, Mandarin is becoming increasingly more prevalent due to the opening up of the PRC.

In New York City in 2002, Mandarin was spoken as a native language by only 10% of Chinese speakers, but was used as an auxiliary language among the greatest number of them and was predicted to replace Cantonese as their lingua franca. Although Min Chinese or Fuzhounese, the majority of Min Chinese, is spoken natively by a third of the Chinese population there, it is not used as a lingua franca because speakers of other dialect groups do not learn Min.

In Richmond (part of the Greater Vancouver metropolitan area in Canada), 55% of the population is Chinese. Chinese words can be seen everywhere from local banks to grocery stores. In the broader Vancouver Census Metropolitan Area, 18% of the population is Chinese. Similarly in Toronto, which is the largest city in Canada, Chinese people make up 11.4% of the local population with the higher percentages of between 20 and 50% in the suburbs of Markham, Richmond Hill and within the city's east end, Scarborough. Cantonese and Mandarin are the most popular forms of Chinese spoken in the area.

Economic growth in the People's Republic of China has given mainland Chinese more opportunities to emigrate. A 2011 survey showed that 60% of Chinese millionaires plan to emigrate, mostly to the United States or Canada. The EB-5 Investment Visa allows many powerful Chinese to seek U.S. citizenship, and recent reports show that 75% of applicants for this visa in 2011 were Chinese. Chinese multimillionaires benefited most from the EB-5 Immigrant Investor Program in the U.S. Now, as long as one has at least US$500,000 to invest in projects listed by United States Citizenship and Immigration Services (USCIS), where it is possible to get an EB-5 green card that comes with permanent U.S. residency rights, but only in states specified by the pilot project.

== Oceania ==
=== Australia ===
Australia has more Chinese people per capita than any other country outside Asia. In the 2021 census, 1,390,693 Australians identified themselves as being of Chinese ancestry, representing 5.5% of the national population. In the same census, 980,555 Australians indicated that they mainly spoke either Mandarin or Cantonese at home, representing 4.0% of the national population, making it the second-most spoken language in Australia after English. The Chinese language is an important part of the Chinese Australian identity.

=== New Zealand ===
English is by far the most widely spoken language among the usually resident Asian population in New Zealand. Nonetheless, the next most common language after English in New Zealand was Yue or Cantonese (16 percent of Asian people with a language) and Northern Chinese/Mandarin (12 percent). Other Chinese languages spoken in Aotearoa New Zealand include Hokkien, Hakka, and Teochew. Some Chinese New Zealanders also adhere to speaking Malay and Indonesian due to a small influx of Chinese immigrants from Southeast Asia.
