= Guy Hutchinson (comedian) =

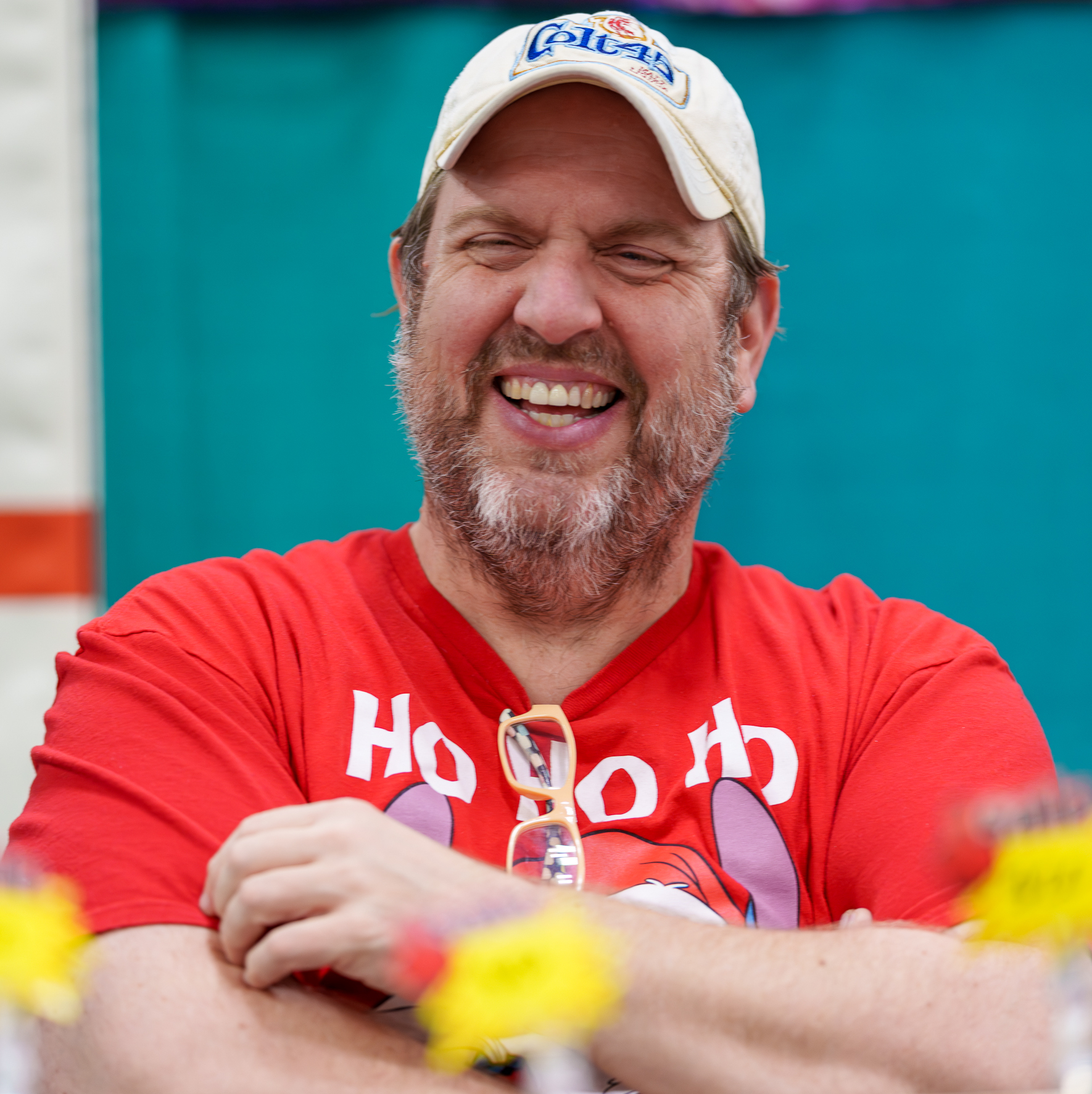
- Guy Hutchinson in 2025
- Born: Guy Anthony Hutchinson; November 22, 1974 (age 51); Princeton, New Jersey, United States
- Occupations: Broadcaster, comedian, author, historian
- Years active: 1993–present
- Notable work: Sesame Place, Drunk On Disney, WHWH, WMGQ, Pointless Nostalgia
- Website: www.guyhutchinson.com

Guy Anthony Hutchinson (born November 22, 1974) is an American author, YouTuber, broadcaster, theme park historian and comedian.

== Published works ==
Hutchinson (with Chris Mercaldo) wrote the book Sesame Place which was published by Arcadia Publishing.

The book was made with the cooperation of Sesame Place and Sesame Workshop and tells the 35-year history of the Pennsylvania theme park in photos and text. Hutchinson had begun researching the history of Sesame Place by "watching other people's home movies on YouTube, sifting through Flickr photos, eBay auctions, and digging through old newspapers on Google," when he was contacted by Mercaldo about pitching the book to Arcadia Publishing.

His additional published works include the following:

- Mean Merle and the Pigeon of Frizzante Park, a children's anti-bullying story book set at a fictional theme park;
- Letters to the Hall of presidents (And Answers to Letters to the Hall of presidents), a humor book where Hutchinson "chronicles" his fictitious former job as responder to fictional correspondence sent to the Presidential robots in the Walt Disney World attraction;
- The Nut Before Christmas, a parody coloring & activity book spoofing A Visit from St. Nicholas, starring "Santa Squirrel"; and
- Ghost Memoirs: Disney After Death, a fictional novel set in the 1990s about two deceased "slacker" Walt Disney World "cast members" whose ghosts fail to reach their eternal resting place, so they stay to haunt the park.
- Bibbity Boozity Book, a cocktail guide featuring drinks from Disneyland and Walt Disney World.

== Podcasts ==
Hutchinson previously co-hosted the interview series The Adventure Club along with co-host John Galbo and others. He also co-hosts Drunk On Disney (with Dana Snyder). On the show they try cocktails from EPCOT and the Disney hotels, but the title of that show refers the host's obsession with Disney theme parks as kids. In a 2015 interview Hutchinson said "we were 'drunk' on Disney before we had ever tried booze."

== Radio ==
Hutchinson began doing voice over work on WHWH radio in 1993. In 1994 he was promoted to "afternoon drive talk show host." Hutchinson left the station in 1997 and began working as a disc jockey at WMGQ where he worked for three years.

== YouTube ==
Hutchinson has a YouTube channel titled Pointless Nostalgia.

== Personal life ==
Hutchinson attended Notre Dame High School in Lawrenceville NJ, graduating in 1993. Raised in Princeton, New Jersey, Hutchinson resides in nearby East Windsor Township, New Jersey.
