= Dick Standish =

American journalist

Dick Standish (born August 26, 1942) is an American journalist.

== Formative years ==
Standish received a Bachelor of Arts degree in History from Rutgers University–New Brunswick in 1964. He was elected to the senior honor society, Cap and Skull, and served as news director and station manager at WRSU Radio Rutgers.

== Career ==
Standish taught Broadcast Journalism in 1977 and 1980 at Rutgers University-Camden. This was a four-credit course that met three mornings each week.

Standish began his professional career in 1964 at WHWH, Princeton. He served as news director, and covered the New Jersey state legislature and political campaigns. His documentary on the people of the New Jersey Pine Barrens won the New Jersey Broadcasters Association's Public Service Programming award in 1965.

He worked at KYW-AM Newsradio from 1967 to 1978. He covered politics and New Jersey issues, including passage of the state income tax and the start of casino gambling in Atlantic City. Twelve years later he quizzed Donald Trump about his application for casino licenses and the related finances. He also won several awards while employed here, including from the Philadelphia Press Association for his reporting on neighborhood feelings after a police shooting and his coverage of the 1977 Garden State Park Racetrack fire, as well as his reporting on women in the job market from the American Women in Radio and Television.

He was transferred to KYW-TV in 1979. That fall, he moderated a live, prime time debate with the three candidates for mayor of Philadelphia. In 1982, the local chapter of Sigma Delta Chi awarded him first place for local news stories when he became the first reporter to announce that Mayor William J. Green III would not seek re-election.

Standish covered politics extensively, including conventions. He worked with the station's pollsters during the eight years that Eyewitness News did polling. He provided the analysis, created the graphics, and helped frame questions. Much of this effort focused on political races. A major polling project documented the feelings of city residents about the violent 1985 confrontation with the MOVE organization.

He also covered other major stories, including refinery fires, Mafia murders, the Three Mile Island nuclear emergency, major trials, hurricanes, blizzards, and issues in New Jersey.

Standish retired on April 30, 2008.

He and his wife, Kim, published "The Rundown," a weekly newsletter of advice for television executives, producers and reporters for nearly thirty years beginning, in 1981. For fifteen years, they also published the "Medical News Report" for healthcare public relations executives.

He was inducted into the Broadcast Pioneers Hall of Fame on November 17, 2017.

After retiring, he became one of the founding members of the ROMEOS, Retired Old Mavens Eating Out. Retired Philadelphia broadcasters meet four times a year to have lunch and stay up-to-date on current news media trends.
