= Language brokering =

Translation method

Direct translation and transfer translation pyramid

Language brokering, also known as child language brokering, refers to the informal act of translation by children and young people between a family member and a dominant language speaker, whereby children can influence both the message and its portrayal. Because their inter-family language differs from the predominant language in society, these children are or must become bilingual.

Language brokering requires children to perform tasks that go beyond the typical expectations for bilingualism. For example, these children also help adults navigate new and different cultures. Brokering must also be situated in context; the physical setting, relational factors, and cultural beliefs and norms of participants influence the brokering experience, such as the feelings and performance of brokers.

== Background ==
Millions of children perform these language brokering roles daily and in many different environments, such as banks, post offices, medical offices, and schools. Perhaps, this is somewhat surprising considering the legal rights of many minority language users across the globe, wherein they are assured access to information through their native language via professional interpreting services, Often professional services are inaccessible because children are so readily available that they become ad hoc interpreters frequent. Brokering is distinct from other forms of translation (e.g., interpreting) as brokering focuses on the cultural significance of such events within a family and within a society rather than the language event itself. Language brokering is not limited to spoken and written translations; it further encompasses the multiple ways in which children engage with communication across several different modes, such as singing, reading, writing, speaking, gesturing, body language, etc. Typically, these language events occur as part of everyday life and involve the need for communication. This is why language brokering is an extremely complicated task; brokers must make use of multiple sources of knowledge spanning languages, modalities, and cultures. Language brokering is most often reported in young children of migrant families.

Although children have served as language brokers for centuries, relatively little empirical attention has been given to them. Research around language brokering practices in bilingual children began in the late 1970s, looking at the process of natural translation. However, language brokering would only become the center of attention for researchers in the late 1990s. During these early studies much work would be done to establish a generalized social and cognitive profile for language brokers. Here, the authors raced to either spotlight the benefits or harms of language brokering. One thing that is less debatable, however, is the need for sound, rigorous research on this understudied topic. More recent work has shifted to look at the practice of language brokering through a more holistic framework across multiple fields.

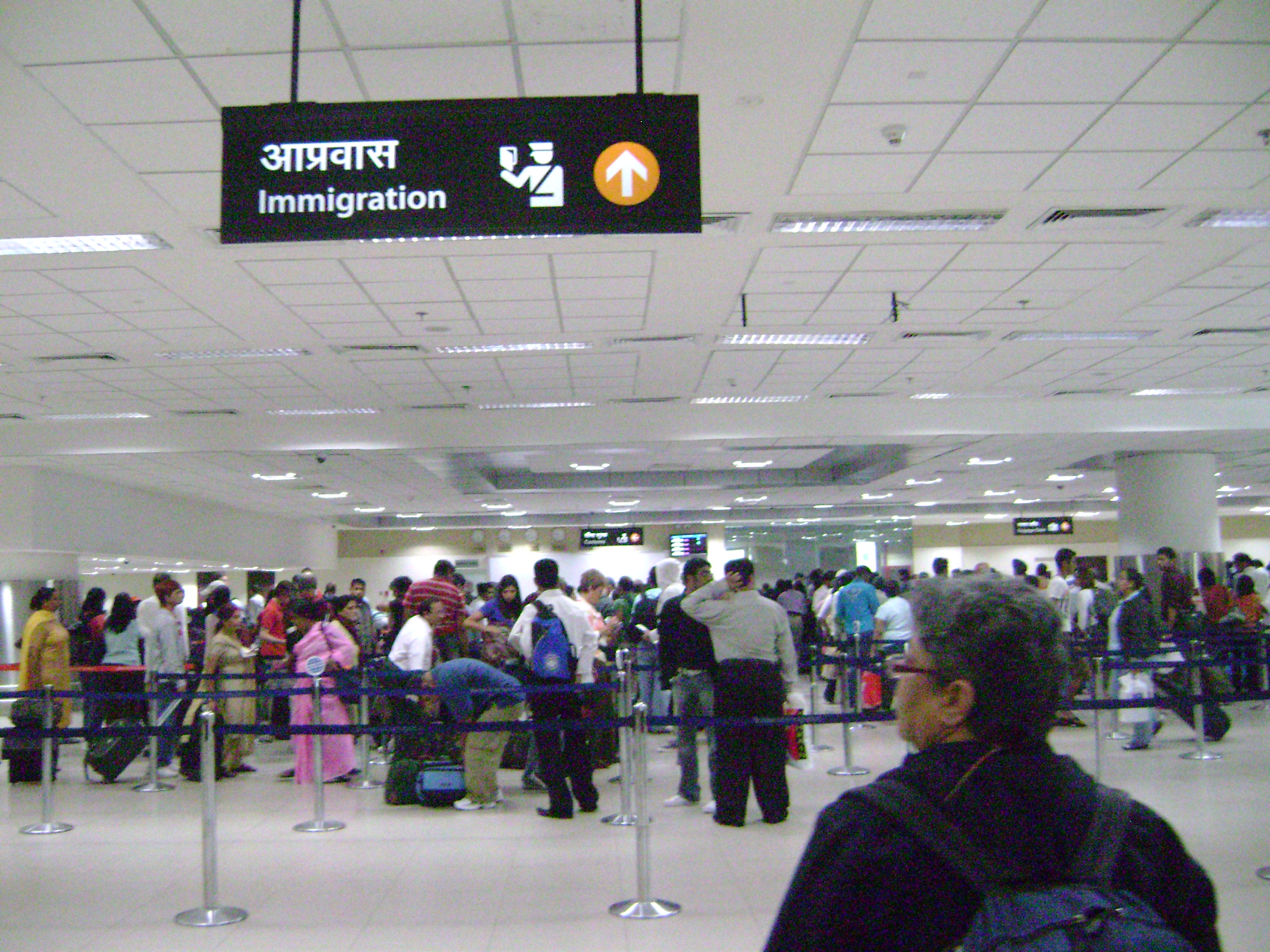
Immigration line at the IGIA.

One reason why children likely take on the role of language brokers in new environments is that children's brains are able to acquire new languages. This has been attributed to how we learn new languages; children tend to learn languages circumstantially, in immersive ways and adults learn languages more often, like fast facts. It is also important to note that not all children from families who do not speak the language of their community assume the role of language brokers. Consider families that live in cultural enclaves, communities with a lot of migrants with shared cultural backgrounds; these families will have less of a need for a language broker. Additionally, expectations for brokering are not distributed evenly. It is more likely that women in the family will presume the role of language broker. Also, older children are more likely to take on the role of language broker within the family. With high levels of variation amongst brokers, one must consider the varying feelings they may have about their role within the family. So far, studies on the feelings children have about language brokering report mixed results.

== Effects of language brokering ==
For language brokers, their lived experience has lasting impacts on their emotional and cognitive development. Uniquely, brokers must integrate two very separate worlds: one in which they are a child growing up and engaging in play with other children following typical development patterns, and another, in which they must assume adult-like responsibilities such as intercultural mediation. Because the expectations of brokers are beyond that of most children, some researchers have suggested that language brokering acts as a stressor, particularly at ages when children are most at-risk for developing poor behavioral patterns. The effects of language brokering are not limited to feelings around brokering. Considering the literature on the cognitive advantages of bilingualism, and the complexity of language brokering researchers have begun to look at the effects that lifelong experience brokering languages have on the brain and how it impacts the brain's development.

=== Socio-Emotional Effects ===
How children feel about their experiences of brokering affects their overall well-being, where positive effects are associated with healthy and sometimes drastically advanced development and negative feelings are related to maladjustment. Primary-aged children report more carefree and willing responses toward their roles as brokers within the family and convey more complex and negative emotions as they get older. This is likely due to the fact that they are still developing complex thoughts and emotions. Another factor that led to the rise in negative feelings towards language brokering is the environments in which the children were asked to broker; in a more high-stress environment, they reported more negative feelings towards brokering. For example, in the context of high discrimination, where the children receive more negative feedback, they might think they are not good at translating and feel less successful at performing language brokering tasks. Negative feelings are usually associated with the fear of making mistakes when using either language(s), such as misunderstanding or mistranslating, or the fact that often they translate for people they love and having to situate themselves within sensitive issues (e.g., health-related, legal-related, etc.). This is especially impactful when considering these conversations are ones from which children are usually shielded.

Not all emotions reported by language brokers were negative; in fact, most children and adults who were raised as brokers report a complex mix of both positive and negative emotions that co-exist simultaneously. Additionally, many brokers have reported positive feelings toward their experience with language brokering. For example, better parent-child relationships correlate with higher brokering frequency. Adults might reflect on language brokering more positively because they better understand its potential benefits, such as better interpersonal skills or language usage. Many of these positive feelings toward language brokering have also been tied to increased academic performance.

=== Cognitive Effects ===
Children raised bilingually have been shown to perform differently on several measures of cognitive performance when compared to monolingual children. Language brokers provide a unique insight into how different lived experiences shape our brains and, in turn, our learning, as they have been shown to apply skills from brokering to other cognitive measures. Language brokering research has heavily focused on the impact of brokering on academic performance. One example is that language brokers who participated in brokering more frequently had a better grasp of semantic convergence across languages, which aids in portraying conceptually accurate information in the target languages. Additionally, language brokers, because of the adult-level themes of their translations, often have better language and text comprehension skills. Because children will often engage in various conversational domains, they also have better cultural competence, in which they can better understand idioms and metaphors across cultures (compared to other bilinguals). Language brokers are problem solvers and decision-makers. They must consider various options, words, and registers when translating for their parents and other adults. Language brokering also affects academic self-concept, which directly affects academic performance. Because parents of minority cultures, such as migrants, may be less aware of the inner workings of the education system in their new environment, they are less prepared and have fewer resources to support their children's academic endeavors, which can result in less motivated and underprepared students.

== Existing problems and future developments ==
CODA movie logo

Family members, educators, and mental health professionals need to become more aware of the consequences of language brokering duties, particularly for preadolescent children, who are most at risk for psychoemotional and cognitive divergence. One of the leading concerns in language brokering is stigmas perpetuating ideologies of over-dependence and lower intelligence for adults whose children broker for them. Consider, for example, the Oscar-winning film CODA. The main character, Ruby Rossi (played by Emilia Jones) is seen interpreting for her deaf parents at a medical appointment where they describe their intimate bedroom behaviors in grave detail, scarring the child while also portraying the parents as people who neither respect nor comprehend appropriate social boundaries.

Additionally, there needs to be more consensus on the cognitive profile of language brokers, as there has been a lack of scientific (quantitative) research compared to cultural (qualitative) research on the topic. Establishing a more standardized cognitive and emotional profile for language brokers will allow educators, family members, and mental health professionals to adapt better approaches to dealing with the specific needs of brokers. There is also a need for a more critical evaluation of the real-world phenomenon of language brokering not as "good" or "bad," but rather "as it is (happening)."

== See also ==
- Semiotics
- Linguistics
- Translation
- Second-language acquisition
