= KALI-FM =

Vietnamese-language radio station in Santa Ana, California

- Santa Ana, California; United States
- Broadcast area: Greater Los Angeles
- Frequency: 106.3 MHz (HD Radio)
- Branding: Radio VNCR

Programming
- Language: Vietnamese
- Subchannels: HD2: KYPA (Korean); HD3: KAZN (Mandarin Chinese)

Ownership
- Owner: Multicultural Broadcasting; (KALI-FM Licensee, LLC)

History
- First air date: February 6, 1960
- Former call signs: KFIL (1960–1964); KYMS (1964–1996)
- Call sign meaning: Cali and later Ca Li

Technical information
- Licensing authority: FCC
- Facility ID: 29020
- Class: A
- ERP: 6,000 watts
- HAAT: 92 meters (302 ft)
- Transmitter coordinates: 33°45′21″N 117°51′18″W

Links
- Public license information: Public file; LMS
- Webcast: Listen live
- Website: nguoiviet.tv/vncr/

KALI-FM (106.3 MHz) is a Vietnamese language radio station licensed by the Federal Communications Commission (FCC) to serve the community of Santa Ana, California, United States. KALI airs musical and entertainment shows. This station directly competes with KVNR 1480 AM, which also airs Vietnamese-language programming.

== History ==
In 1958, Phillip F. Brestoff received the construction permit to build 106.3 FM in Santa Ana. After selling the permit to Gus Malpee, KFIL signed on February 6, 1960. Malpee went bankrupt in 1963, and KFIL went silent. George W. Smith bought the station out of bankruptcy the next year and changed its call sign to KYMS. The new station broadcast from studios in the Saddleback Inn Hotel in Santa Ana, with "prestige-type" easy listening music. It also received a first-of-its-kind authorization from the Federal Communications Commission to rebroadcast news programs from the BBC World Service received via shortwave.

In 1968, KYMS was sold to Southwestern Broadcasters. The station aired a progressive rock format in the early 1970s. On March 15, 1975, with the station $10,000 in debt a month, KYMS adopted a Christian contemporary format. The station aired music by Calvary Chapel's Maranatha! Music and carried some of Calvary Chapel's concerts. It also carried block programming from Christian ministries, including The Bible Answer Man, with Walter Martin. General manager Arnie McClatchey later joined with Paul Toberty to form Interstate Broadcasting System, buying KYMS as well as Christian AM stations, KRDS in Phoenix and KBRN (which would have its calls changed to KLTT) in Denver, for $3.8 million in late 1981.

In 1985, the amount of programming devoted to Christian ministries was reduced and inspirational songs by secular artists were added to the station's playlist.

In 1995, KYMS was sold to Multicultural Broadcasting for $9.1 million and it switched to a brokered Asian format. On January 22, 1996, the station's call sign was changed to KALI-FM.
