= WPAT (AM) =

Multicultural radio station in Paterson, New Jersey, United States

- Radio transmitter towers for the station in Clifton
- Paterson, New Jersey; United States
- Broadcast area: North Jersey; New York City
- Frequency: 930 kHz
- Branding: WPAT 930 AM

Programming
- Languages: English; Spanish
- Format: Brokered programming

Ownership
- Owner: Multicultural Broadcasting; (Multicultural Radio Broadcasting Licensee, LLC)
- Sister stations: WKDM; WWRU; WZRC

History
- First air date: May 3, 1941
- Call sign meaning: Paterson (WPAT's city of license)

Technical information
- Licensing authority: FCC
- Facility ID: 51661
- Class: B
- Power: 5,000 watts
- Transmitter coordinates: 40°50′59.36″N 74°10′57.52″W

Links
- Public license information: Public file; LMS
- Webcast: Listen live
- Website: www.wpat930am.com

WPAT (930 kHz) is a AM radio station licensed to Paterson, New Jersey, with a brokered programming format. It is owned by Multicultural Broadcasting with studios in Manhattan's Financial District.

WPAT is powered at 5,000 watts, using a directional antenna to protect other stations on 930 AM from interference. The station's four 380-foot towers are on Broad Street in Clifton, New Jersey, near the Garden State Parkway.

== History ==
=== Beautiful music ===
WPAT signed on the air on May 3, 1941. It originally was a daytimer broadcasting at 1,000 watts, required to go off the air at night. Its studios were at 7 Ellison Street in Paterson. In December 1949, it began broadcasting 24 hours a day, with power increased to 5,000 watts, by using a directional antenna. The studios were moved to 66 Hamilton Street. Air personalities at the time included John Henry Faulk.

For many years, the station aired a beautiful music format under the slogan "Easy 93". Coincidentally, WPAT-FM, its sister station added in 1957, was also called "Easy 93" because it broadcasts at 93.1 MHz. WPAT-AM-FM were the essence of a mellow sound and feel. Announcers spoke in hushed tones and even the recorded commercials were expected to be low-key. When the Federal Communications Commission (FCC) ordered AM-FM combo stations in larger cities to end full time simulcasting in the late 1960s, WPAT took a unique approach to the challenge. While they were forbidden to air the same songs at the same time, the stations began "shadowcasting". The FM station would repeat the previous week's AM song list in a slightly different order on FM.

Initially, WPAT's music was instrumental versions of popular adult music, as well as Broadway and Hollywood show tunes. Artists included Mantovani, Henry Mancini, Stan Kenton, Jackie Gleason, the Hollyridge Strings, Ray Conniff, Percy Faith, David Rose and Ferrante & Teicher. Some of the music bordered on light classical.

=== Capital Cities ownership ===
The WPAT stations were purchased by Capital Cities Communications in 1961. In the late 1960s, the stations added several vocals per hour. They were pop standards artists including Frank Sinatra, Tony Bennett, Patti Page, Nat King Cole and Doris Day. Vocals were always soft, with string arrangements. They steered clear of jazzy type vocals at that point. Throughout the 1960s, WPAT also resisted playing easy instrumental versions of baby boomer pop and rock and roll songs. However, after WCBS-FM adopted a more youthful easy listening format called the "Young Sound" which played instrumental versions of rock songs and some soft rock vocals, WPAT reacted. It also began playing these songs in instrumental easy arrangements.

In the 1970s, WPAT began integrating some current soft vocals from artists including The Carpenters, Neil Diamond, Dionne Warwick and Barbra Steisand. WPAT-AM-FM included one vocal in each 15-minute music sweep. In 1982, the stations began playing soft adult contemporary songs mixed into the format a few times an hour and cut back on pop standards artists and songs.

=== Park Communications and Heftel Broadcasting ===
In 1985, Capital Cities announced that it would buy the American Broadcasting Company (ABC), including its television and radio stations. As a result of FCC regulations at the time, the company decided to sell WPAT-AM-FM because ABC already owned WABC and WPLJ in New York City. The WPAT stations would be sold to Park Communications. By the early 1990s both frequencies of WPAT all but eliminated the instrumentals and went full time with a soft AC vocal format.

In January 1996, the two stations were sold to separate owners. WPAT-FM was acquired by Spanish Broadcasting System (SBS) and switched to a Spanish-language adult contemporary format. WPAT AM was sold to Heftel Broadcasting. It switched to a Spanish-language automated classic salsa music and tropical music format on March 26. Heftel had sought to buy WPAT-FM as well, but was narrowly outbid by SBS. Heftel bought WPAT with plans to sell it to Multicultural Broadcasting, which would help it to buy an FM station. The company's plans were to not change formats to Spanish music for the long term but to broker the station in advance of its eventual sale.

Weeks later, the station started adding paid programming, mostly aimed at ethnic listeners in their language. The station continued running overflow sports events from WFAN in English as well as English-language public affairs programming. In January 1997, the station began brokering 18 hours a day to Radio Korea. The station kept Spanish-language programming a few hours a day, in addition to the English-language sports and public affairs programs. This was done with intent of selling the station.

=== Multicultural Broadcasting ===
By the next year, the station's ownership finally changed when Multicultural Broadcasting bought the station in exchange for WNWK (105.9 FM). In addition, Multicultural was paid some cash for WNWK as well. (WNWK subsequently became WCAA, then in 2009 switched frequencies with WQXR-FM, creating the eventual WXNY-FM 96.3).

Multicultural modified WPAT's format to full-time paid ethnic programming. That included moving Radio Korea's programming to WZRC. Currently WPAT is the New York home for the syndicated radio show "La W", from Colombia in South America. It is heard every weekday morning, featuring personality Julio Sánchez Cristo.

== See also ==
- List of radio stations in New Jersey
