= Multicultural Broadcasting =

American ethnic radio broadcaster

- Company type: Private
- Industry: Radio and Television Broadcasting
- Founded: 1982
- Headquarters: New York City, New York, U.S.
- Area served: United States
- Website: mrbi.net

Multicultural Broadcasting is a media company based in New York City founded by Chinese-American businessman Arthur Liu. It caters mostly to the Asian American community and owns television and radio stations in several of the top markets in multiple languages.

The company was founded as Multicultural Radio Broadcasting Inc. (MRBI) in 1982 with an initial business in United States radio broadcasting industry. To this day, it remains the largest Asian American owned media group in the U.S.

== Air America controversy ==
In 2004, two weeks after Air America Radio's debut, it was pulled off the Multicultural radio stations in the Chicago and Santa Monica markets due to a contract dispute. Air America alleged that Multicultural sold time on their Los Angeles station to both AAR and another party, and claimed that was why they stopped payment on checks due Multicultural while AAR investigated.

Multicultural noted that Air America bounced a check and claimed they were owed in excess of $1 million. Air America Radio filed a complaint in New York Supreme Court, charging breach of contract and was briefly granted an injunction to restore the network on WNTD in Chicago. On April 20, the network announced the dispute had been settled, and Air America's last day of broadcast on WNTD was April 30. The New York Supreme Court ultimately concluded that the injunction was improvidently entered and that Air America Radio's court action was without merit, dismissing Air America's complaint and awarding over $250,000 in damages and attorneys' fees to Multicultural. According to a subsequent lawsuit filed by Multicultural, Air America Radio never paid the sums ordered by the court.

== Radio stations by state ==
Source for list:

=== California ===
- KALI-FM - Santa Ana
- KALI (AM) - Orange
- KAZN - Pasadena/Los Angeles
- KAHZ - Pasadena (at Pomona)
- KMRB - Los Angeles
- KBLA - Santa Monica/Los Angeles
- KFSG - Sacramento
- KLIB - Sacramento
- KATD - Pittsburg/Sacramento (satellite of KIQI 1010)
- KEST - San Francisco
- KIQI - San Francisco
- KSJX - San Jose/San Francisco

=== Florida ===
- WNMA - Miami
- WEXY - Fort Lauderdale/Miami
- WJCC - Miami

=== Maryland ===
- WLXE - Rockville
- WFBR - Glen Burnie

=== Massachusetts ===
- WAZN - Watertown
- WLYN - Lynn

=== New Jersey ===
- WHWH - Princeton
- WPAT - Paterson (NYC)
- WWRU - Jersey City (NYC)

=== New York ===
- WKDM - New York City
- WZRC - New York City

=== Pennsylvania ===
- WTTM - Philadelphia

=== Texas ===
- KDFT - Dallas/Fort Worth Metroplex (at Ferris)
- KMNY - Dallas/Fort Worth Metroplex (at Hurst)
- KCHN - Houston

=== Washington ===
- KXPA - Seattle
- KARI - Blaine
- KVRI - Blaine (studios in Surrey, British Columbia, serving Metro Vancouver)

== Television ==
On September 26, 2006, Multicultural Broadcasting made an agreement with The E. W. Scripps Company to buy five of Scripps' Shop At Home/Jewelry Television affiliated broadcast television stations for $170 million. Sales were final on KCNS (San Francisco), WOAC (Canton, Ohio; now WRLM), WRAY-TV (Raleigh/Durham, North Carolina) on December 20, 2006, followed by WMFP (Boston) and WSAH (Bridgeport, Connecticut). Prior to that, the five stations switched to a 24-hour infomercial format. The Sunbelt Television-owned KHIZ (now KILM) (Barstow, California) has been absorbed into Multicultural's portfolio upon FCC approval, however, it remained an affiliate of SonLife Broadcasting Network.

On November 5, 2008; Multicultural Broadcasting has suffered financial defaults of $135 million in loans and the company has headed into a trust under the care and feeding of Lee W. Shubert for the purposes of selling off assets and paying off their creditors. Stations included KCNS, WMFP, WOAC, and WRAY-TV. WOAC was the first to be picked up on June 24, 2009 by Tri-State Christian Television, through Radiant Life Ministries. WRAY-TV was sold in October 2009. In January 2011, KCNS, WMFP, and WSAH were sold to NRJ TV, LLC. KILM was the only remaining TV station in the Multicultural group until 2018 when Ion Media purchased it and converted it to an Ion Life affiliate.

In 2012 Arthur Liu sold its headquarters at 449 Broadway, relocating executive offices and studios to 40 Exchange Place in the Financial district.
