= Chinese language in the United States =

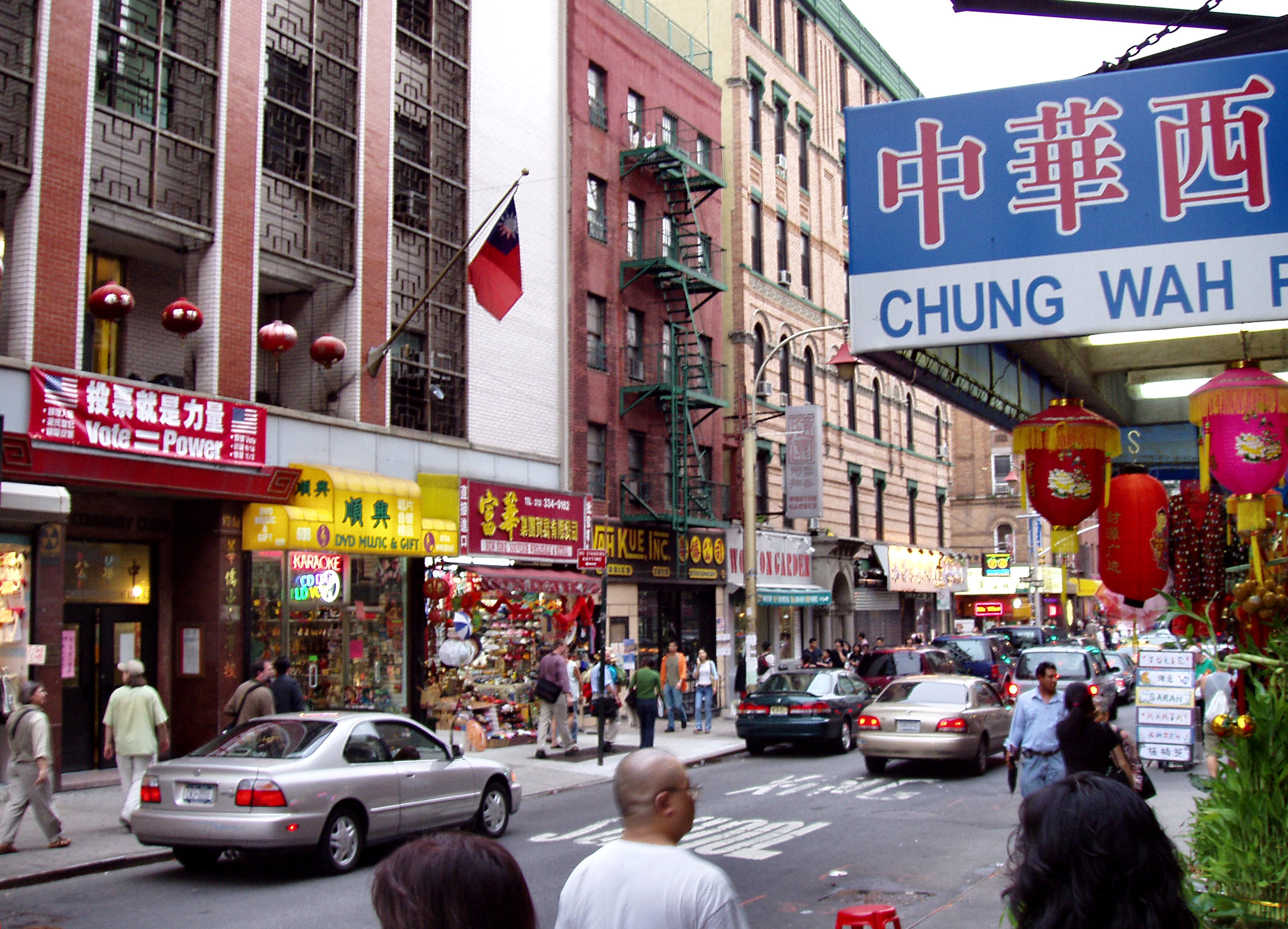
Manhattan Chinatown

Chinese speakers in the United States
| Year | Speakers |
|---|---|
| 1960^{a} | 89,609 |
| 1970^{a} | 190,260 |
| 1980 | 630,806 |
| 1990 | 1,319,462 |
| 2000 | 2,022,143 |
| 2010 | 2,808,692 |
^a Foreign-born population only

Chinese, including Mandarin and Cantonese among other varieties, is the third most-spoken language in the United States, and is mostly spoken within Chinese-American populations and by immigrants or the descendants of immigrants, especially in California and New York. Around 2004, over 2 million Americans spoke varieties of Chinese, with Mandarin becoming increasingly common due to immigration from mainland China and to some extent Taiwan. Within this category, approximately one third of respondents described themselves as speaking Cantonese or Mandarin specifically, with the other two thirds answering "Chinese", despite the lack of mutual intelligibility between different varieties of Chinese. This phenomenon makes it more difficult to readily identify the relative prevalence of any single Chinese language in the United States.

According to data reported on the 2000 US census long-form, 259,750 people spoke "Cantonese", with 58.62% percent residing in California and the next most with 16.19% in New York. The actual number of Cantonese speakers was probably higher. In the 1982–83 school year, 29,908 students in California were reported to be using Cantonese as their primary home language. Approximately 16,000 of these students were identified as limited English proficient (LEP).

According to data reported on the 2000 US census long-form, 84,590 people spoke "Taiwanese Hokkien". The county with the most Hokkien speakers was Los Angeles County with 21,990 (0.250% of County population) followed by Orange County with 5,855 (0.222% of County population). The county with the highest percentage of Hokkien speakers was Calhoun County, Texas at 0.845% (160) followed by Fort Bend County, Texas at 0.286% (935) and Los Angeles County, California. According to data collected from 2005–2009 by the American Community Survey, 76,822 people spoke Taiwanese Hokkien.

In New York City, Standard Mandarin Chinese was spoken as a native language among only ten percent of Chinese speakers as 2002, but was being used as a secondary dialect and replacing Cantonese as their lingua franca.

Chinese (all varieties) speakers by states in 2000
| State | Chinese speakers |
|---|---|
| California | 815,386 |
| New York | 374,627 |
| Texas | 91,500 |
| New Jersey | 84,345 |
| Massachusetts | 71,412 |
| Illinois | 65,251 |

== Statistics ==
Chinese language(s) spoken at home according 2005–2009 American Community Survey
| Name | Number of speakers | Margin of error | Speaks English "very well" | Margin of error |
|---|---|---|---|---|
| Total | 2,896,766 | 13,255 | 1,600,886 | 8,527 |
| "Chinese" | 1,867,485 | 13,875 | 1,054,885 | 8,578 |
| Hakka | 1,350 | 307 | 840 | 263 |
| "Kan, Hsiang" | 50 | 65 | (D) | (D) |
| Cantonese | 458,840 | 6,487 | 257,625 | 4,433 |
| Mandarin | 487,250 | 7,953 | 240,810 | 5,571 |
| Fuchow | 1,450 | 455 | 1,175 | 418 |
| Hokkien | 77,675 | 2,687 | 44,140 | 1,939 |
| Wu | 2,670 | 466 | 1,375 | 287 |

== Language acquisition ==
Chinese Americans teach their children Chinese for a variety of reasons, such as preservation of a unique identity, pride in their cultural ancestry, desire for easy communication with Chinese-speaking family members, and the perception that Chinese will be a useful language as China's economic strength increases. Cantonese, historically the language of most Chinese immigrants, was the third most widely spoken non-English language in the United States in 2004. Many Chinese schools have been established to accomplish these goals. Most of them have classes only once a week on the weekends, however especially in the past there have been schools that met every day after normal school.

While approximately 9% of Chinese-born immigrants speak only English at home, this proportion may reach as high as 90% by the third generation living in the United States. While usage of Chinese at home, community connections, extracurriculars, and explicit instruction may help mitigate loss of Chinese language proficiency in young Chinese immigrants, the prevalence of English as a majority language in the United States means that many second and third generation Chinese Americans have limited or no ability to speak or read Chinese.

Because all Chinese languages are tonal, monolingual speakers of English often have difficulty producing Chinese tones and may have a pronounced accent or impaired ability to recognize tones in speech. Chinese orthography is also uniquely challenging to acquire fluency in, with each character representing an entire phonosemantic domain, rather than sounds that can be reasoned out piecemeal, as in an alphabet or syllabary.

Chinese immigrants may face competing sociocultural interests in maintaining fluency in Chinese and enforcing Chinese language use among their children. Some Chinese Americans view Chinese language fluency as a core part of a Chinese cultural identity and may opt to use only Chinese in the home or forbid the use of English. Other families view English proficiency and assimilation as key to their children's future success. The status of Asian Americans, and more specifically Chinese Americans as "perpetual foreigners" may be a contributing factor behind the desire for some Chinese Americans to achieve or raise their children towards monolingual English fluency at the expense of Chinese fluency.

These desires are often at odds with the attested benefits of bilingualism, including a stronger sense of cultural identity and social norms, lower incidence of behavioral issues, and ability to comfortably navigate both English and Chinese speaking contexts.

== Chinese as a foreign language ==
A 2006 survey by the Modern Language Association found that Chinese accounted for 3% of foreign language class enrollment in the United States, making it the seventh most commonly learned foreign languages in the United States.

== See also ==
- Chinese American
- Language and overseas Chinese communities
