= KALI (AM) =

Radio station in West Covina, California

- West Covina, California; United States
- Broadcast area: Greater Los Angeles
- Frequency: 900 kHz
- Branding: KALI 900 AM

Programming
- Format: Mandarin Chinese

Ownership
- Owner: Multicultural Broadcasting; (Multicultural Radio Broadcasting Licensee, LLC)

History
- First air date: September 25, 1963
- Former call signs: KWCR (1961); KGRB (1961–1996); KRRA (1996–1999)

Technical information
- Licensing authority: FCC
- Facility ID: 56779
- Class: D
- Power: 5,000 watts (day); 150 watts (night)
- Transmitter coordinates: 34°1′48″N 117°43′39″W

Links
- Public license information: Public file; LMS
- Website: Official website

KALI (900 AM) is a commercial radio station licensed to West Covina, California, United States, and serving the eastern suburbs of Los Angeles. The station is owned by Multicultural Broadcasting and broadcasts Mandarin Chinese and other ethnic programming.

KALI's transmitter is sited on East Olive Avenue in Chino.

== History ==
=== KGRB ===
The station was put on the air by former KTLA contract engineer Robert Burdette and his wife Gloria on September 25, 1963 (with call letters standing for Gloria and Robert Burdette). The station was a daytimer, broadcasting with 250 watts, and required to sign off at sunset.

It gained an FM sister station when Burdette acquired KSGV from the San Gabriel Valley Broadcasting Company and rechristened it KBOB on January 1, 1967. The stations promoted themselves as "KGRB, KBOB, The Twin Voices of The (San Gabriel) Valley".

Burdette, who had once been an engineer for Tommy Dorsey and other big band artists, programmed a big band and adult standards format for KGRB. The station featured a library including original 78 rpm recordings. KGRB was authorized to increase its daytime power to 500 watts in 1975, though the higher power level did not take effect until 1977. KGRB and KBOB became only partial simulcast partners in 1977 when, to satisfy FCC regulations, KBOB programs began to originate for five hours a day from the University of La Verne campus.

In 1994, after Burdette suffered a stroke, KGRB was put into a conservatorship. Steve Ray (who had worked at KCLU, KLIT, KMPC, and KRCI) was brought in to manage the stations. He made KGRB an NBC Radio Network affiliate, renaming it "AM 90 NBC". Ray was in the process of acquiring the KNBC (AM) call letters, but the format ended on December 28, 1995, when a court-appointed conservator took over.

=== KRRA ===
The conservator leased KGRB and KBOB to El Dorado Broadcasting, and KGRB reemerged at the start of 1996 with a Regional Mexican format as "Radio Ranchito". A new KRRA call sign debuted on May 6.

Later in 1996, El Dorado bought the combination outright, but it did not hold on to the cluster for long, selling KRTO (the renamed KBOB) to Cox Radio and then selling KRRA to Multicultural Broadcasting. On June 28, 1999, KRRA became KALI, call letters formerly associated with the 1430 AM frequency (which became KMRB).

=== KALI ===
In 2008, Multicultural was forced to place KALI in a trust, known as Transition Radio, when Multicultural's owner, Arthur Liu, acquired KHIZ television. The FCC does not permit one owner to hold too many media outlets in the same market.

When Multicultural sold KYPA 1230 AM, it was able to reclaim KALI from the trust. It changed the programming of the station to Mandarin Chinese and other ethnic shows.
