= Angels Radio Network =

American radio network

The Angels Radio Network is a network of 8 radio stations that air Major League Baseball games of the Los Angeles Angels. As of March 2026, 6 stations broadcast games in English, while another 2 broadcasts them in Spanish.

== English ==
The English announcers are Terry Smith on play-by-play and Mark Langston with color commentary.

=== Radio affiliates ===
Callsign	Frequency	Location
KLAA	830 AM	Orange (English flagship station)
KSPN	710 AM	Los Angeles (Certain Games)
KMET / K251CC	1490 AM / 98.1 FM	Banning / Riverside
KJJZ-HD3 / K274DA	95.9-HD3 & 102.7 FM	Palm Springs
KLOA	1240 AM	Ridgecrest

== Spanish ==
A separate network airs games in Spanish. Jose Tolentino joined the Angels broadcast crew in 2007 and is currently the team's Spanish-language play-by-play announcer.

Callsign	Frequency	Location
KWKW	1330 AM	Los Angeles (Spanish flagship station)
KTMZ	1220 AM	Pomona (Simulcast of KWKW)

== See also ==
- List of XM Satellite Radio channels
- List of Sirius Satellite Radio stations
- List of Los Angeles Angels broadcasters
