= WRTO (AM) =

Radio station in Chicago

Chicago, Illinois; United States
- Broadcast area: Chicago metropolitan area
- Frequency: 1200 kHz
- Branding: 1200 AM

Programming
- Language: Spanish
- Format: Spanish AC/Regional Mexican (Daytime); Spanish Sports (Nighttime)
- Affiliations: TUDN Radio

Ownership
- Owner: Latino Media Network; (Latino Media Network, LLC)

History
- First air date: January 1990; 35 years ago
- Former call signs: WOPA (1990–1995); WLXX (1995–2003); WVIV (2003)

Technical information
- Licensing authority: FCC
- Facility ID: 11196
- Class: B
- Power: 20,000 watts day; 4,500 watts night
- Transmitter coordinates: 41°39′43.12″N 87°37′48.17″W

Links
- Public license information: Public file; LMS

WRTO (1200 kHz) is an AM radio station in Chicago, Illinois. It currently broadcasts a Spanish-language adult contemporary and regional Mexican format during the day and Spanish sports at night. It is owned by the Latino Media Network. Under a local marketing agreement (LMA), it was programmed by previous owner TelevisaUnivision's Uforia Audio Network until giving full operations of the station to the owner in the fall of 2023.

By day, WRTO is powered at 20,000 watts. As 1200 AM is a clear channel frequency reserved for Class A station WOAI in San Antonio. WRTO reduces power to 4,500 watts at night. It uses a directional antenna at all times, with a six-tower array. The transmitter is on West 127th Street in Chicago, near the Little Calumet River.

== Programming ==
WRTO features local sports programming as well as shows from the Spanish-language sports network "TUDN Radio", originating at other Uforia Audio Network stations.

WRTO is the flagship station of the Chicago Fire of Major League Soccer and the Chicago Bears of the National Football League. It also broadcasts select Chicago Bulls, Chicago Cubs, Chicago White Sox and Chicago Blackhawks games in Spanish.

== History ==
=== Spanish contemporary and regional Mexican ===
The station began broadcasting in January 1990, and held the call sign WOPA. It was owned by CID Broadcasting Inc. In August 1993, its format was changed from Regional Mexican to Spanish AC.

In 1995, the station was sold to Heftel Broadcasting for $4.5 million. Concurrent with the sale, its call sign was changed to WLXX, and it switched back to a Regional Mexican format branded "La X". On September 20, 1996, the station adopted a tropical music format. On January 12, 2003, the station adopted a Spanish CHR format branded "Viva", simulcasting 103.1 WXXY. On January 17, 2003, its call sign was changed to WVIV, while its FM sister station's call sign was changed to WVIV-FM.

=== Spanish talk and sports ===
Logo as TUDN 1200

In October 2003, the station's call sign was changed to WRTO, and it began airing Spanish-language talk programming, which Univision Radio had moved from AM 560 WIND. It became a full time Spanish-language news/talk station in February 2004. WRTO became a part of the Univision America talk radio network on July 4, 2012. While the network itself ceased operations in 2015, WRTO aired remnants of Univision America's programming, as well as its local news, sports, and weather. On March 16, 2017, the station switched to a Spanish language all-sports format, as an affiliate of Univision Deportes.

WRTO was one of eighteen radio stations that TelevisaUnivision sold to Latino Media Network in a $60 million deal announced in June 2022, approved by the Federal Communications Commission (FCC) that November, and completed on December 30, 2022. Under the terms of the deal, Univision agreed to continue programming the station for up to one year under a local marketing agreement.

In December 2024, WRTO began airing Spanish adult contemporary and regional Mexican music during the day while maintaining the TUDN Radio Spanish sports format at night.
