= Fred Crane (actor) =

American actor (1918–2008)

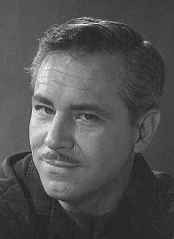
- Born: Herman Frederick Crane; March 22, 1918; New Orleans, Louisiana, U.S.
- Died: August 21, 2008 (aged 90); Atlanta, Georgia, U.S.
- Occupations: Actor, radio announcer
- Years active: 1939–1965
- Spouses: Rose Marcelle Dudley Heaslip (m. 1940; div. 1946) Ruth Ceder (m. 1946; div. 1959) Barbara Jeanne Garoutte (m. 1960; div. 1975) Anita Joan Cohen (m. 1976; died 1998) Terry Lynn Halfacre (m. 1999)
- Children: 5

Herman Frederick Crane (March 22, 1918 – August 21, 2008) was an American film and television actor and radio announcer. He is probably best known for his role as Brent Tarleton in the 1939 film, Gone with the Wind, speaking the opening lines in the movie during the opening scene with Scarlett O'Hara (Vivien Leigh) and Stuart Tarleton (George Reeves).

== Biography ==
Crane was born in New Orleans, Louisiana, in 1918. Along with his brothers John and Harry, he grew up on General Pershing St. and went to the MacDonough #13 and Alcee Fortier schools. His father was a dentist whose father and grandfather also were dentists. Fred broke the trend, getting into acting and football at both Loyola and Tulane Universities. His first job in his teens was working in his spare time for an ice delivery service, before electric refrigerators had caught on.

Around the time he was 20, his mother gave him "$50 and a suitcase" to come out to Hollywood and get into motion pictures, impressed that a neighbor's daughter had signed a movie contract. At first he stayed with relatives as well as taking a job at the local zoo to pay the rent, after which at night he read books to a relative whose vision was deteriorating. He soon was invited on a trip to Selznick International Pictures, where his cousin, Leatrice Joy Gilbert, (daughter of Leatrice Joy) was going to audition for the part of Suellen in the movie Gone with the Wind. During a discussion, his authentic Southern accent combined with striking good looks landed him a meeting with Gone with the Wind initial director George Cukor and producer David O. Selznick, which led to a script reading with Vivien Leigh, who had been chosen to play Scarlett O'Hara. Selznick signed Crane to a 13-week contract at $50 a week.

Crane played the part of Brent Tarleton, one of Scarlett's suitors, and spoke the opening lines in the film. One of the lasting Trivial Pursuit questions was initiated when an error in the credits listed his character’s name as Stuart, who was actually played by George Reeves, who is best remembered as Superman in the TV series. It was deemed too costly to fix this, so it was left that way. Brent speaks the opening lines of the movie, "What do we care if we were expelled from college, Miss Scarlett? The war's going to start soon, so we would have left college anyhow."

Crane did not attend the film's 1939 premiere in Atlanta, although he attended the premiere in Los Angeles with his good friend and "twin," George Reeves, at Carthay Circle Theatre. In later years (June 1998), he was one of the special guests at the celebrity-studded premiere screening of the restored version of Gone with the Wind hosted by Ted Turner in Atlanta.

As he began a family, World War II limited his options as acting work was difficult to come by, so he began tutoring at Crossroads of the World, one of his film students being Gene L. Coon (well known for his work on the first season of Star Trek: The Original Series), and also working in a munitions factory until the war came to a close.

Shortly afterward in 1946, he interviewed with Errett Lobban Cord, then-owner of KFAC (1330 AM), which had recently completed an evolution to a fine arts/classical music format. Crane was hired part-time, (a second vocation attributed to his vocal prowess) for his speaking voice and extensive familiarity with musical compositions. He had done and continued to do other radio programs simultaneously, such as staff voice actor on The Jack Benny Program (on NBC Radio), and other announcing roles. He had mastered a talent for not only the retention of information, performances, and musical acuity in general, but classical music in particular, partly from his college studies but also from being a follower of the Walter Damrosch radio program for many of his younger years.

He continued to dabble in film, working on the Cisco Kid television series (one of the first to be shot in color) in an episode entitled The Gay Amigo (1949), with Duncan Renaldo as the Kid and Leo Carrillo as Pancho. He eventually appeared in several TV shows, including guest roles and staff roles on shows such as Lost in Space, Voyage to the Bottom of the Sea, Twilight Zone, Peyton Place, Lawman, Hawaiian Eye, and 77 Sunset Strip. He also appeared on General Hospital later in the 1970s and continued taking on occasional jobs in narration.

His family continued to grow, leading him to explore other, more dependable work options as well. He spent several years working at a pharmacy, several more years as a fine tools machinist and inspector, and several years in housing construction partnership, all while working part-time at KFAC until a full-time position opened up in the 1960s.

About a decade later, he was promoted to AM Program Director (Carl Princi was the FM Director) in addition to the duties of performing his 6-hour morning show live (Hark, the Glad Sounds), and recording voice tracks and commercials for the all-night show (Music Out of the Night) for several hours each weekday after his show completed at noon. His show was frequently in the top 5 of drive-time popularity, ranked by polls in the Los Angeles Herald-Examiner during that time.

As a signature opening for his radio show, he'd often start with the opening of Gone with the Wind and then his introduction. Crane continued with the radio station after it moved from Prudential Square (near Wilshire and La Brea) to new quarters on Yucca St. in Hollywood, until the day when most of the older staff were dismissed without notice in 1987. Those who were fired eventually won their case against this issue in an age discrimination suit. Crane continued to work in radio for several years after that, at KKGO, which was partly jazz, partly classical programming at that time.

He semi-retired in the 1990s, beginning a tour of several years of appearances for fans and special events, as well as cruise ship lectures and continuing on charity fundraisers for PBS station KCET.

== Personal life ==
In 1940, he married his first wife, Rose Marcelle Dudley Heaslip (div. 1946), and later went on to marry another four times to Ruth Ceder (m. 1946; div. 1959), Barbara Jeanne Garoutte (m. 1960; div. 1975), Anita Joan Cohen (m. 1976; died 1998), and Terry Lynn Halfacre (m. 1999). He had five children.

The new millennium took him full circle back to the southern states, where he and his fifth wife, Terry Lynn, bought an antebellum mansion in Barnesville, Georgia and turned it into Tarleton Oaks, a bed-and-breakfast with a Gone With The Wind museum, where guests could view artefacts from the film. Tarleton Oaks was sold at an auction in 2007 due to Crane's failing health, and as a part of the experience attendees were treated to a few hours of fond recollections from his early days in the film industry.

=== Illness and death ===
Around 2003, Crane developed difficulties with diabetes, which he acquired shortly after his second heart surgery. He'd had successful surgery to repair a vein in his leg, which had limited circulation due to the combination of diabetes and a previous heart operation in which the vein had been removed for heart bypass surgery. However, infection escalated in the leg, prolonging his hospital stay, and he contracted a pulmonary embolism a few days later. He died on August 21, 2008, at the age of 90.

Crane was the last male surviving actor who played an adult role in "Gone with the Wind", leaving only Patrick Curtis, who was one of several infants who played baby Beau Wilkes, and Mickey Kuhn, who played Beau Wilkes as a child. Both Curtis and Kuhn died in 2022.

== Filmography ==
Year	Title	Role	Notes
1939	Gone with the Wind	Brent Tarleton	(Miscredited as Stuart Tarleton)
1949	The Gay Amigo	Duke - Henchman	
1960-1961	Lawman	Jury Foreman	3 episodes
1961	Surfside 6	Policeman	1 episode
1963	The Twilight Zone	News Anchorman	1 episode
1965	Lost in Space	Alpha Control Technician	1 episode
1965	Voyage to the Bottom of the Sea	Cyborg	Voice, 1 episode
1965-1966	Peyton Place	Ralph Courtney, The New Pharmacist	7 episodes
1987	General Hospital	Toy Shop Owner	1 episode
