= Enrique González Olvera =

Enrique Alejandro González Olvera
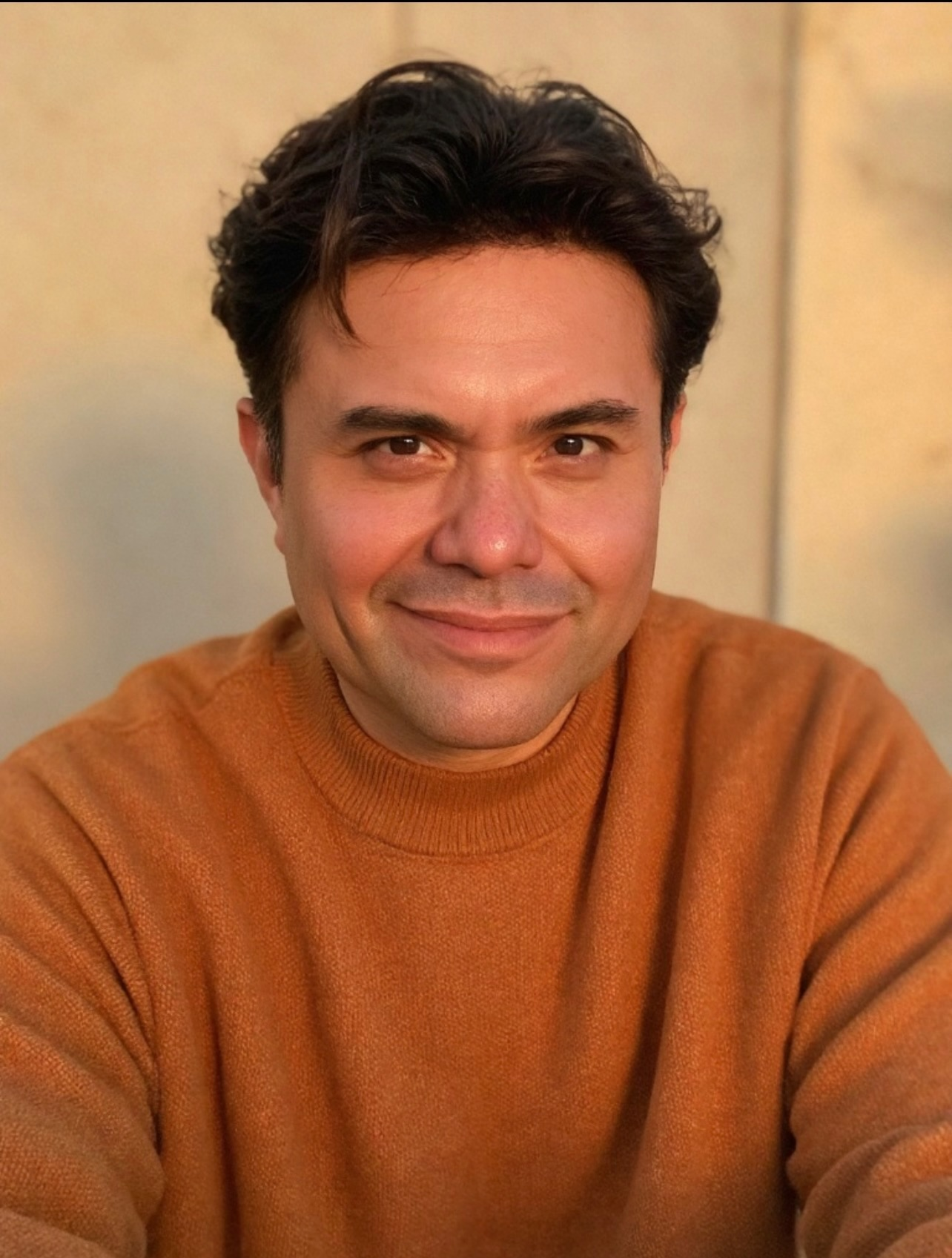
- Enrique González
- Born: November 4, 1970 (age 55); Torreón, Coahuila, Mexico
- Other name: Enrique Deportes
- Education: Universidad Iberoamericana Torreón
- Occupations: Journalist, sports commentator, television producer, director and editor
- Years active: 1990s–present
- Parents: Enrique González V. (1945–2023) (father); Laura E. Olvera (born 1950) (mother)

Enrique Alejandro González Olvera (born November 4, 1970) is a Mexican journalist, sports commentator, television producer, director and editor from Torreón, Coahuila. His career has included work in radio and television in Mexico and the United States, including Televisa, Univision, TUDN Radio and video production for the Houston Independent School District.

== Early career ==
González studied communication at the Universidad Iberoamericana Torreón and began his professional career in his hometown of Torreón, Coahuila. He worked at XHOAH-TV Canal 9, where his reporting assignments included cultural, medical, educational, federal and environmental issues.

He later worked on the Monitor Ciudadano and Los Olvidados segments of the station's Noticiero Regional, which focused on community issues and people experiencing social and economic hardship.

González studied at the Universidad Iberoamericana campus Torreón. He began his professional television career in 1994 at Canal 9 of Multimedios in Torreón, Coahuila.

== Radio career ==
González also worked in radio in Torreón. In April 1997, he and radio personality Francisco Javier Flores participated in the Maratón 102 broadcast on Radio Éxitos 102.7.

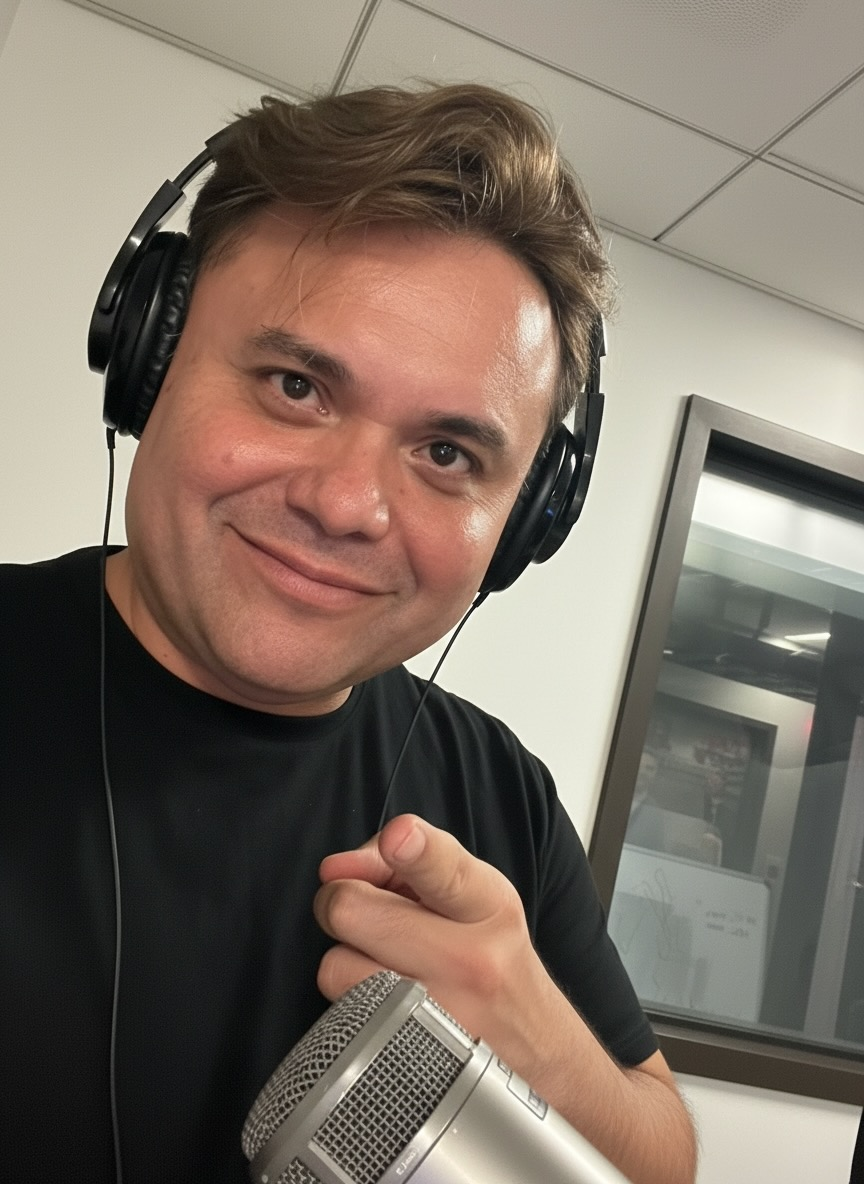
González during a TUDN Radio broadcast.

The broadcast lasted 102 hours and seven minutes and was conducted from a tower at Hipermart Independencia in Torreón. The event raised money for charitable organizations serving children in the Laguna region.

Contemporary coverage by El Siglo de Torreón reported that approximately 200,000 pesos were collected during the broadcast and distributed among four charitable institutions.

== Sports journalism ==
González subsequently moved to Ciudad Juárez, Chihuahua, where he transitioned into sports journalism and worked for Televisa Canal 56. His work there included the development of the sports television program Televisa Deportes.

In 1999, González was named Cronista Deportivo del Año ("Sports Journalist of the Year") by the Dirección General del Deporte of the Municipality of Ciudad Juárez.

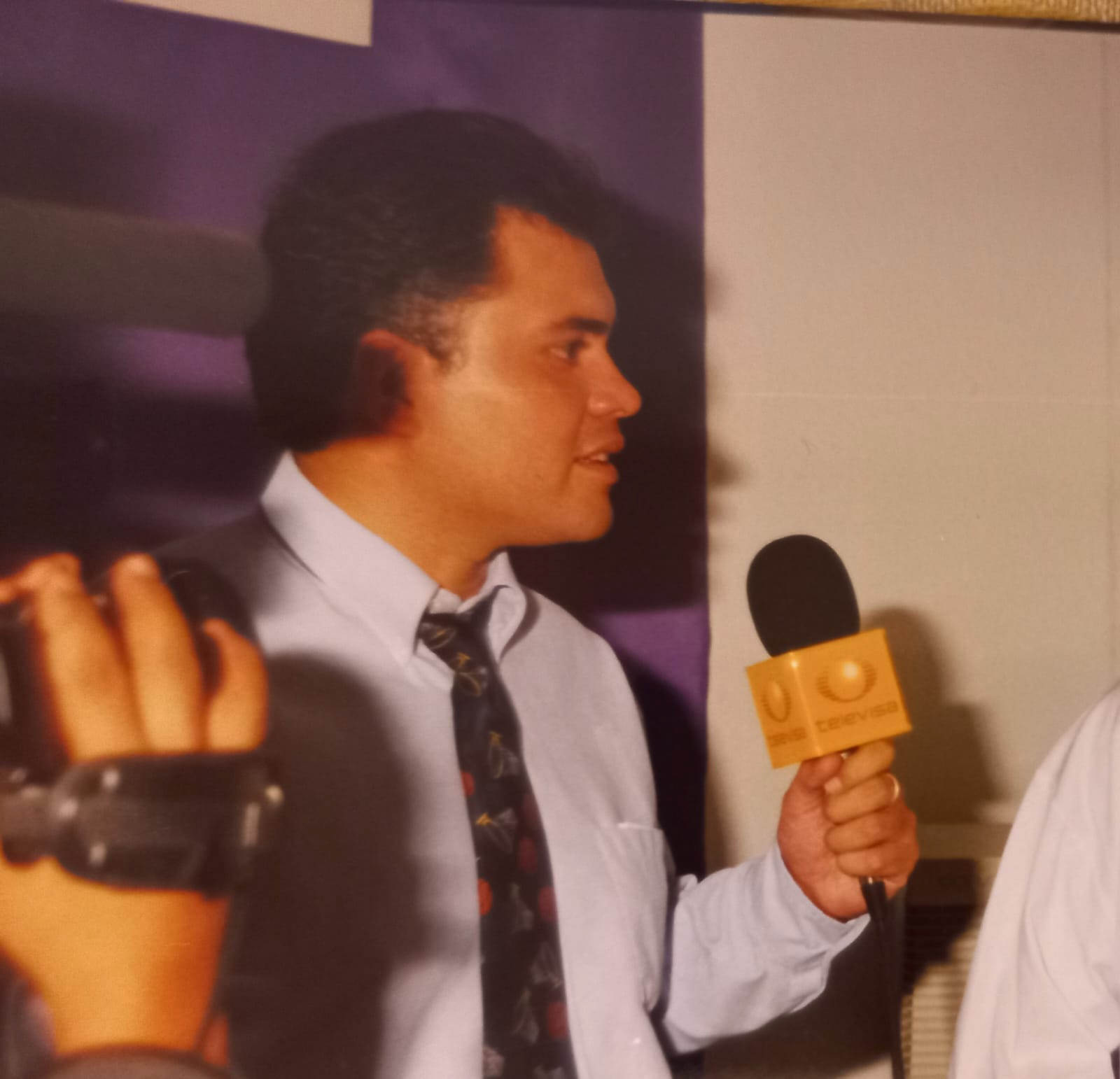
González during his television career in Mexico.

In 2002, he received an honorable mention in the Best Local Sportscaster category of the El Paso Times Reader's Choice Awards.

== Career in the United States ==
González continued his broadcasting career in the United States, working in sports television in Sacramento and later Houston.

He subsequently joined Univision Houston, where he worked as a sports journalist, presenter, producer, editor and reporter. His work included Acción Deportiva Houston and Acción Deportiva Extra Houston.

In 2017, González joined the Houston Independent School District in a multimedia production role.

His work at HISD has included television and digital video production, directing and editing.

González has also participated in sports programming for TUDN Radio, including soccer-related broadcasts and programs.

=== Digital media ===
In addition to his work in television and radio, González has expanded his work into digital media, producing and presenting content for YouTube, Facebook and Instagram under the Enrique Deportes and Enrique Descubre brands. While Enrique Deportes originated primarily as a sports-focused platform, Enrique Descubre encompasses a broader range of subjects, including travel, culture, food, interviews and feature stories.

== Emmy Awards ==
In 2009, González received a Lone Star Emmy Award in the Sports Programs – Feature/Segment category for a television report about professional wrestling. The achievement was reported by the Mexican newspaper El Siglo de Torreón.

His subsequent television and video production work received additional Lone Star Emmy Awards, including productions associated with Univision Houston and the Houston Independent School District.

Selected Emmy Awards
Year	Production	Organization / Station	Credit	Result
2009	Lucha Libre	KUVS Univision 19	Reporter	Winner
2015	Acción Deportiva Extra Houston	KXLN Univision 45	Anchor / Producer / Editor / Reporter / VJ	Winner
2018	Más Que Mil Palabras	Houston Independent School District	Producer / Director / Editor / Camera	Winner
2018	Mochila de Sueños	Houston Independent School District	Producer / Director / Editor / Camera	Winner
2018	Camino al Éxito	Houston Independent School District	Producer / Director / Editor / Camera	Winner
2020	Where Dreams Come True	Houston Independent School District	Producer / Director / Editor	Winner
2021	Return Safe, Return Strong	Houston Independent School District	Producer / Director / Editor	Winner
2022	The Hard Road to Success / El difícil camino hacia el éxito	Houston Independent School District	Executive Producer / Director / Camera / Editor	Winner

== Telly Awards ==
González has also received recognition from the Telly Awards for his work in television and video production.

In 2023, Solo Tal Vez (Just Maybe), produced by TacosFilms LLC, received a Silver Telly Award in the General – Low Budget (Under $700 per Minute) category. González was credited as editor on the production.

== Personal life ==
González is married to Arlette Anguiz González.

González is the son of Enrique González V. (1945–2023) and Laura E. Olvera (born 1950). He has two siblings, Carlos A. González Olvera and Diana C. González Olvera.
