= KTMZ =

Spanish-language news/talk radio station in Pomona, California

- Pomona, California; United States
- Broadcast area: Inland Empire; Los Angeles County
- Frequency: 1220 kHz

Ownership
- Owner: Lotus Communications; (Lotus Los Angeles Corp.)
- Sister stations: KFWB; KIRN; KWKW

History
- First air date: December 23, 1960
- Last air date: December 2025
- Former call signs: KKAR (1960–1978); KLIT (1978–1983); KTSJ (1983–1996); KWPA (1996–2000); KWKU (2000–2015)

Technical information
- Licensing authority: FCC
- Facility ID: 1925
- Class: B
- Power: 250 watts
- Transmitter coordinates: 34°01′11″N 117°43′06″W

Links
- Public license information: Public file; LMS

KTMZ (1220 AM) was a commercial radio station licensed to Pomona, California, United States. Owned by Lotus Communications, KTMZ last operated as a simulcast for Los Angeles-based KWKW (1330 AM), with its signal covering communities on the border between Los Angeles County and San Bernardino County. The transmitter was located on Riverside Drive near Roswell Avenue in Chino. The station was on the air from 1960 to 2025.

== History ==
The station began broadcasting December 23, 1960, as KKAR. It was owned by Intrastate Broadcasters. KKAR originally was a daytimer station, running 250 watts by day and required to go off the air at night, because 1220 AM is a Mexican clear channel frequency reserved for XEB in Mexico City. KKAR was initially intended to offer "FM listening on AM radio", with a "good music" format, playing easy listening sounds.

Intrastate sold KKAR to West Coast Communications, Inc. in late 1960 for $160,000. The sale closed on January 1, 1967. Under West Coast, the station flipped to a Top 40 format. In late 1970, Elizabeth Schirmer, a former employee of KFMB-TV in San Diego, acquired KKAR for $250,000. The ownership and format wheels spun again in 1973 when the station flipped to country music on February 24. The Schirmer Family later sold the station to Bassett Broadcasting.

In 1976, it began airing a Spanish language contemporary hits format after being purchased by JATO Communications. Bassett asked to sell the station before the then-required three-year period, citing its poor financial condition.

In 1978, JATO acquired KSOM-AM-FM and was required to spin off the 1220 frequency as a result. The KKAR intellectual unit moved to 1510 kHz as KNSE; at the same time, Gore Broadcasting, Inc., acquired the frequency and relaunched it as a Christian radio outlet, KLIT. In 1983, its call sign was changed to KTSJ. Several groups owned KLIT/KTSJ during its tenure as a religious outlet, including Creative Communications of Pomona and American Sunrise Communications. KTSJ continued airing a Christian religious format until 1994, when it returned to playing Spanish hits.

In 1996, the station’s call sign was changed to KWPA. Personal Achievement Radio bought the station from American Sunrise for $875,000. (Personal Achievement briefly held the call letters KWPA, KXPA and KYPA, all in Los Angeles, for the stations it owned.)

However, KWPA only briefly simulcast KYPA. In 1997, it shifted to a gold-based Spanish adult contemporary format as "Radio Mía" and attempted to secure the call letters KMIA. Multicultural Broadcasting would acquire KWPA and KYPA in 1997.

=== Spanish-language sports ===
Lotus Communications acquired KWPA from Multicultural Radio at the end of 1999 for $750,000. In 2000, KWPA became KWKU, and it began simulcasting Lotus's Spanish-language sports outlet, KWKW. The 1220 station helped KWKW improve its reception in Pomona and Ontario, in addition to serving as an overflow station for KWKW sports coverage. For a time, KWKU also exclusively carried broadcasts of the Los Angeles Sparks of the WNBA.

The KWKU nominal main studio in Pomona proved critical to getting KWKW back on the air after disaster struck on December 6, 2001. A major fire at the Sunset Vine Tower, which was home to the Lotus Communications Los Angeles cluster, caused extensive electrical damage to the building. It was deemed unsafe by fire officials. 105 computers, mixers and other equipment were carted out of the building, and John Cooper, the chief engineer for Lotus Los Angeles, drove them to Pomona, where the station was back on the air in six hours. As a result of the extensive damage, Lotus relocated temporarily to the recently vacated KTNQ studios and later purchased a building near Universal Studios Hollywood to be fitted out for its operation.

In 2015, the 1220 call sign was changed to KTMZ. The station was taken silent in December 2025; in their special temporary authority filing with the Federal Communications Commission (FCC), Lotus cited a loss in advertising revenue as a result of the second Trump administration's immigration policies towards Spanish-speaking residents. The FCC cancelled the KTMZ license on August 13, 2026.
