= KTNQ =

Radio station in Los Angeles

- Los Angeles, California; United States
- Broadcast area: Greater Los Angeles
- Frequency: 1020 kHz
- Branding: La 1020 AM

Programming
- Language: Spanish
- Format: Adult Contemporary and Classic Regional Mexican

Ownership
- Owner: Latino Media Network; (Latino Media Network, LLC.)

History
- First air date: March 13, 1925
- Call sign meaning: "Ten Q"

Technical information
- Licensing authority: FCC
- Facility ID: 35673
- Class: B
- Power: 50,000 watts
- Transmitter coordinates: 34°02′00″N 117°59′3.2″W

Links
- Public license information: Public file; LMS
- Webcast: Listen live (via iHeartRadio)
- Website: www.iheart.com/live/ktnq-1020am-5268

KTNQ (1020 AM) is a Spanish commercial radio station licensed to Los Angeles, California, United States, serving the Greater Los Angeles. Owned by Latino Media Network, KTNQ features an Adult Contemporary and Classic Regional Mexican music format, with studios on West Olive Avenue in Burbank and transmitter sited in the City of Industry.

From its original licensing on March 13, 1925 until 1955 it was called KFVD. The station was originally restricted in its broadcast hours, signing off at local sunset to protect KDKA Pittsburgh from nighttime sky wave interference. Later, the FCC allowed geographically spread daytime stations to operate at night with a directional pattern away from the previously protected station. 1020 kHz in Los Angeles was then allowed to operate as a 24 hour station.

== History ==
=== KFVD ===
J. Frank Burke was a "news-analyst, commentator, noted for his American progressiveness, tolerance, and liberalism", and owner and operator of both KFVD and KPAS. The FCC later gave notice to dispose of one of the stations.

From 1937 to 1939, Woody Guthrie broadcast regular shows from KFVD, then run by Frank Burke Sr. and his son Frank Burke. First he accompanied his Cousin Leon "Oklahoma Jack" Guthrie, later with Maxine "Lefty Lou" Chrissman. The Woody and Lefty Lou-Show soon became the most popular on the station. When Chrissman resigned for health reasons, Guthrie continued for another year as The Lone Wolf until he was sacked for his unrelenting support for the Soviet Union even after they invaded Poland.

=== KPOP and KGBS ===
From August 1, 1955, until 1960, it was called KPOP. This was an early version of a Top 40 format with a daytime-only signal (sunrise to sunset). Personalities included Earl McDaniel, Hunter Hancock and Art Laboe.

From June 29, 1960, until 1976, it was called KGBS. Storer Broadcasting assumed ownership and changed to a soft MOR/adult standards format. From about 1965 to 1968 KGBS went to a so-called "Town and Country" format featuring modern country music.

The late 1960s saw the arrival of KGBS' most successful format, personality-oriented adult contemporary blended with Bill Ballance's groundbreaking "Feminine Forum". The Bob Hudson & Ron Landry morning comedy duo was launched during this period and Dave Hull "The Hullabalooer" added his zany antics to afternoons.

=== KTNQ ===
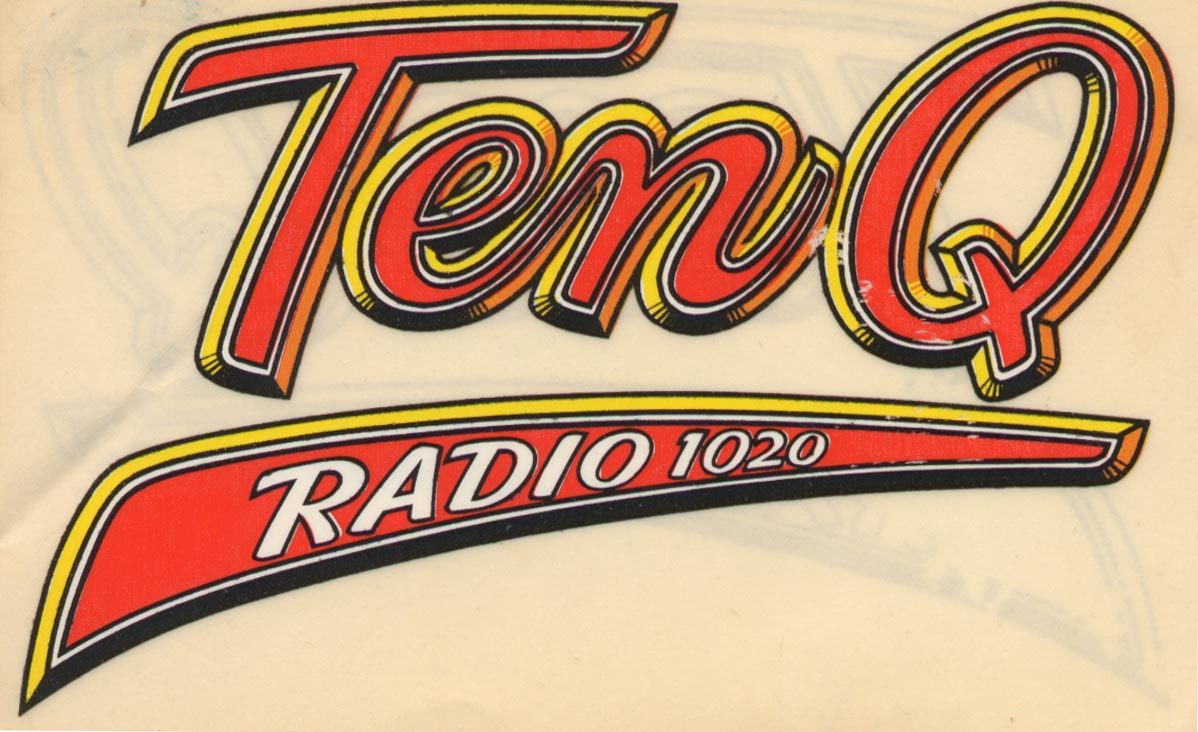
KTNQ 10Q Logo

On December 26, 1976, the station's call sign was changed to the current KTNQ, originally billed as "The New Ten Q." KTNQ would later change languages to Spanish at noon on July 31, 1979.

During the late 1970s along with competitor stations such as KHJ (AM) and San Diego–based XETRA-AM ("The Mighty 690"), the station specialized in Top 40 music, and was broadcast in English. The radio station figures prominently in the Ron Howard film Grand Theft Auto. where disc jockey "The Real" Don Steele is doing a live broadcast from a helicopter with the station's call sign following two star-crossed lovers.

==== Talk programming ====
KTNQ was a part of the Univision America Talk Radio network as of July 4, 2012. While the network itself ceased operations in 2015, KTNQ aired the remnants of Univision America's programming as well as local news, weather, and sports.

KTNQ has been the Spanish language flagship station of the Los Angeles Dodgers since 2011. It also broadcast Dodger games from 1979 to 1986.

==== Sports programming ====
On December 20, 2016, Univision announced that KTNQ would be one of the charter affiliates of Univision Deportes Radio, their new Spanish-language sports network launched in April 2017. It continued to broadcast the network upon its June 20, 2019, rebrand to TUDN Radio. In September 2019, KTNQ returned to a locally-programmed Spanish-language news/talk format, after KWKW took on the TUDN Radio affiliation following the shutdown of the competing ESPN Deportes Radio network.

=== Latino Media Network sale ===
On June 3, 2022, Univision announced it would sell a package of 18 radio stations across 10 of its markets, primarily AM outlets in large cities (including KTNQ) and entire clusters in smaller markets such as McAllen, Texas, and Fresno, California, for $60 million to a new company known as Latino Media Network (LMN); Univision proposed to handle operations for a year under agreement before turning over operational control to LMN in the fourth quarter of 2023. The sale was consummated on December 30, 2022.
