= Carl Princi =

American actor and radio announcer (1920–1992)

- Carl Princi in Highway Patrol 1955
- Born: Carl Victor Princi; September 27, 1920
- Died: May 1, 1992 (aged 71)

Carl Victor Princi (1920-1992) was an American actor and radio announcer.

== Early life ==
Princi was born on September 27, 1920, in Boston, Massachusetts, to Joseph M. and Teresa M. Princi. Princi had three brothers, one of whom was Peter W. Princi, Collector of Customs for the Port of Boston and a United States magistrate judge.

== Acting ==
Princi trained as an actor in Boston. He began acting at the age of 14 when he appeared in a cameo role in a WPA Theater project.

Princi appeared in both film and television. He had a small role in the film version of How to Succeed in Business Without Really Trying, and provided the narration for the film. He also appeared in television episodes of Highway Patrol, I Led Three Lives, and Bewitched.

Princi also served as a narrator for several television broadcasts of classical music.

== Radio ==
While at Boston University, Princi took a course in broadcasting, which led to a job at WESX.

From 1952 to 1953, Princi was a bilingual presenter at KWKW (1300 AM). In 1953 he joined KFAC (1330 AM) and KFAC-FM (92.3) in Los Angeles, where he remained until 1987 when the station changed formats and fired all of its on-air talent. At KFAC, Princi hosted World of Opera and Opera House and conducted many of the station's interviews.

In 1991 he returned to radio at KKGO as a staff announcer and host of Sunday Evening at the Opera.

== Personal life and death ==
Princi died on May 1, 1992, at Saint Joseph Medical Center in Burbank, California, due to complications of cancer.

He was survived by his wife and their three daughters, one of whom is actress Elaine Princi.
