= TUDN Radio =

Spanish-language sports radio network in the United States

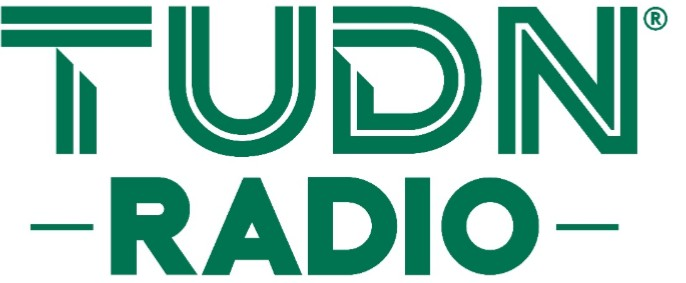
- Type: Radio network
- Country: United States

Ownership
- Owner: TelevisaUnivision

History
- Launch date: March 15, 2017; 9 years ago
- Replaced: Univision America; ESPN Deportes Radio
- Former names: Univision Deportes Radio (2017–2019)

Coverage
- Availability: Semi-national on terrestrial radio TuneIn iHeartRadio; Uforia

Links
- Webcast: Listen live
- Website: www.tudn.com/TUDN-radio

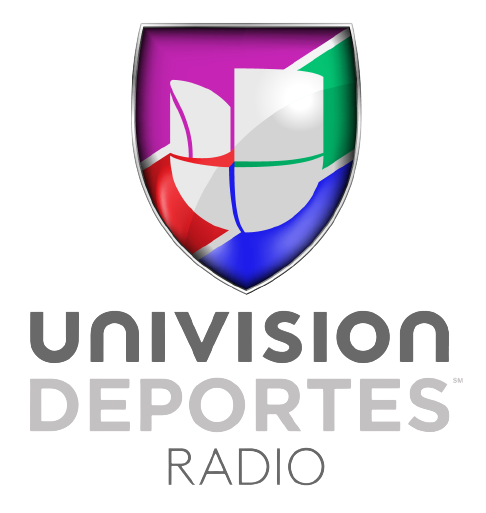

TUDN Radio (formerly Univision Deportes Radio) is an American Spanish-language sports radio network operated by Uforia Audio Network, a division of TelevisaUnivision. It launched on March 15, 2017 on ten AM and FM radio stations, most of which previously affiliated with the ill-fated Univision America until its 2015 closure. The network features stations in the states of California, Texas, Illinois, Nevada, New York and Florida, covering half of the country's Hispanic population.

While its main focus is on soccer, Univision Deportes Radio competed against ESPN Deportes Radio, owned by ESPN Inc., until 2019 which had 40 stations in 14 states.

On July 20, 2019, the network was renamed TUDN Radio, as part of a wider multi-platform relaunch of the Univision Deportes division as TUDN, in partnership with Televisa. With the September 2019 discontinuation of ESPN Deportes Radio, the network picked up some of its former stations (including Los Angeles' KWKW).

== Programming ==
At the launch of the network, its programming lineup consisted of mainly radio versions of select Univision Deportes Network shows, such as Locura Deportiva (which was originally broadcast on Univision América), Contacto Deportivo, and Fútbol Club, as well as original programming including Buenos Días América, El Tiradero, and Tribuna Interactiva. In 2022, the network plans to begin airing Desde el Diamante (From the Diamond), a weekly show devoted to Major League Baseball news.

The network also broadcasts select Liga MX, Major League Soccer, CONCACAF Champions League and UEFA-sanctioned soccer matches. The network started airing Major League Baseball games during the 2021 playoffs, followed by select regular season games (mainly Spanish simulcasts of Sunday Night Baseball), the Home Run Derby, and the All-Star Game from the following season onward as well as select games of the 2023 World Baseball Classic.

=== Local sports ===
Stations air sport games from local professional teams, including:

- Major League Baseball: Los Angeles Angels, Chicago Cubs, Chicago White Sox, New York Yankees, Arizona Diamondbacks, and Texas Rangers;
- Major League Soccer: FC Dallas, Houston Dynamo, LA Galaxy, and Chicago Fire;
- National Basketball Association: Chicago Bulls, Phoenix Suns, and Dallas Mavericks;
- National Football League: Chicago Bears, Los Angeles Rams, and Arizona Cardinals;
- National Hockey League: Chicago Blackhawks and Los Angeles Kings.

=== On-air talent ===
- Juan Carlos Ávalos
- María Fernanda Alonso
- Leslie Soltero
- Gabriel Sainz
- Diego Peña
- Luis Manuel Gómez Luna
- Gustavo Rivadeneira
- Julio César Quintanilla
- Antonio Murillo
- Miguel Ángel Mendez
- Luis Quiñones
- Reinaldo Navia
- Javier Ledesma
- Ramón Morales
- Pedro Antonio Flores
- Marcelo Salazar
- Katya Mercader
- Ernesto Tadeo Quijas

== Affiliates ==
All affiliates are owned and operated by Univision unless otherwise noted.

=== Mexico ===
==== Baja California ====
- XEPE-AM 1700 kHz (Tecate) (Note: Owned by Primer Sistema de Noticias)

=== United States ===
==== Arizona ====
- KQBU-FM 105.1 MHz (Phoenix)

==== California ====
- KSOL-HD2 98.9 MHz (San Francisco)
- KWAC 1490 kHz (Bakersfield) (Note: Owned by Lotus Communications)
- KWKW 1330 kHz (Los Angeles)
- KSCA-HD3 101.9 MHz (Glendale/Los Angeles)
- KLNV-HD2 106.5 MHz (San Diego/Tijuana, Mexico)
- KVEN 1520 kHz / 96.3 MHz (Oxnard/Ventura)
- KGST 1600 kHz (Fresno)

==== Colorado ====
- KMXA 1090 kHz (Aurora) (Note: Owned by Entravision Communications)

==== Florida ====
- WRTO-HD2 98.3 MHz (Goulds/Miami)
- WEFL 760 kHz (West Palm Beach) (Note: Owned by Good Karma Brands)

==== Illinois ====
- WKRS 1220 kHz (Waukegan) (Note: Owned by Alpha Media)
- WRTO 1200 kHz (Chicago) (nighttime only) (Note: Owned by Latino Media Network)
- WPPN-HD2 106.7 MHz (Des Plaines/Chicago)

==== Nevada ====
- KENO 1460 kHz (Las Vegas) (Note: Owned by Lotus Communications)

==== New Jersey ====
- WTTM 1680 kHz (Lindenwold) (Note: Owned by Multicultural Broadcasting)

==== New Mexico ====
- KRZY 1450 kHz (Albuquerque)

==== New York ====
- WXNY-HD2 96.3 MHz (New York City)

==== Texas ====
- KLQB-HD2 104.3 MHz (Austin)
- KSVE 1650 kHz (El Paso)
- KBZO 1460 kHz (Lubbock)
- KLTN-HD2 102.9 MHz (Houston)
- KAMA-HD2 104.9 MHz (Deer Park)
- KFLC 1270 kHz (Benbrook) (nighttime only)
- KAMV-HD2 107.1 MHz (Benbrook)
- KLNO-HD2 94.1 MHz (Fort Worth)

== Former affiliates ==
- KCOR 1350 kHz (San Antonio)
- KTNQ 1020 kHz (Los Angeles) [Returned to its previous News/Talk format]
- WWBG 1470 kHz (Greensboro, North Carolina)
- KLSQ 870 kHz (Las Vegas) [At first, long-term silent; then Classic Hits and back to Spanish Sports]
- KROM-HD2 92.9 MHz (San Antonio)
- WJFK 1580 kHz (Washington, D.C.) [Now broadcasting a sports-betting format]
- KOOR 1010 kHz (Portland)
- XEXX-AM 1420 kHz (Tijuana)
- KLAT 1010 kHz (Houston) [Now broadcasting a Spanish AC/Regional Mexican format]
- WADO 1280 kHz (New York City)
- KGBT 1530 kHz (Harlingen, Texas)

== See also ==
- Univision Communications
- Univision Radio
- Univision Deportes
