= Univision America =

American Spanish-language talk radio network

Univision América
- Type: Radio network
- Country: United States

Ownership
- Owner: Univision Radio
- Parent: Univision Communications

History
- Launch date: July 4, 2012; 13 years ago
- Closed: June 25, 2015; 10 years ago
- Replaced by: Univision Deportes Radio

Coverage
- Availability: National, but not available in all areas

Former logo used until 2013.

Univision America (stylized as Univision AMerica) was a Spanish-language talk radio network produced and distributed by Univision Communications. It was launched on July 4, 2012 on 9 U.S. AM radio stations in California, Texas, Illinois, Nevada, and Florida. As of March 2014, it added one FM station in New York. The stations are all owned and operated by Univision Radio (now known as Uforia Audio Network). The network featured local, national and international news, weather and traffic updates, as well as shows focused on the issues that matter most to Hispanics.

In 2015, Univision America's roster of programs were gradually canceled in a restructuring effort. The AM network was deemed unprofitable and was retooled to a music and paid programming format. The network's website redirected to a local website of a lone Univision America affiliate in Los Angeles. While the former affiliates in Texas switched to a Spanish-language Contemporary Christian music format under the "Amor Celestial" branding, many other affiliates opted to keep the News/Talk format with up-to-date local headlines, weather, and sports scores as well as remnants of this network's programming.

All the stations that previously broadcast this network are now affiliated with Univision Deportes Radio, which launched in early 2017. In 2019, it was rebranded as TUDN Radio.

== See also ==
- Univision Communications
- Univision Radio
