= KWKW =

Spanish-language talk radio station in Los Angeles

- Los Angeles, California; United States
- Broadcast area: Greater Los Angeles
- Frequency: 1330 kHz
- Branding: La Primera 1330 AM

Programming
- Language: Spanish
- Format: Talk radio with sports
- Affiliations: TUDN Radio

Ownership
- Owner: Lotus Communications; (Lotus Los Angeles Corp.)
- Sister stations: KFWB; KIRN

History
- First air date: March 22, 1922
- Former call signs: KJS (1922–1925); KTBI (1925–1931); KFAC (1931–1989)
- Former frequencies: 830 kHz (1922–1925); 1020 kHz (1925–1927); 1040 kHz (1927–1928); 1090 kHz (1928–1929); 1300 kHz (1929–1941)
- Call sign meaning: Carried over from the former KWKW (1300 AM) in Pasadena; now KAZN

Technical information
- Licensing authority: FCC
- Facility ID: 38454
- Class: B
- Power: 5,000 watts
- Transmitter coordinates: 34°01′10″N 118°20′47.3″W
- Translator: 100.7 K264CQ (Los Angeles)

Links
- Public license information: Public file; LMS
- Webcast: Listen live
- Website: www.tuligaradio.com

KWKW (1330 AM, "La Primera") is a Spanish-language commercial radio station licensed to Los Angeles, California, United States, featuring a talk format with sports play-by-play. Owned by Lotus Communications, the station serves Greater Los Angeles and much of surrounding Southern California. The studios for KWKW are located in the Los Angeles Hollywood Hills neighborhood, while the station transmitter is located in the nearby Crenshaw District, shared with KABC (790 AM) and KFOX (1650 AM). In addition to a standard analog transmission, KWKW's programming is streamed online and relayed over low-power translator K264CQ (100.7 FM).

This station was launched as KJS by the Bible Institute of Los Angeles in 1922, renamed KTBI in 1925, and is the oldest surviving radio station in the United States to be built and signed on by a religious institution. The onset of the Great Depression led KTBI to be sold to a group led by Errett Lobban Cord in 1931, who rechristened it KFAC; Cord became sole owner the following year. With no network affiliation, KFAC featured popular local programs including the children's show "Whoa Bill" Club, and was a career stepping stone for multiple Hollywood celebrities and actors. Throughout the 1940s, KFAC gradually adopted fine arts and classical music programming on a full-time basis, becoming one of the first radio stations in the United States to do so. As a classical station, KFAC boasted an airstaff with unprecedented stability and continuity including announcers Carl Princi and Fred Crane, and possessed the largest classical music library of its kind west of the Mississippi. The nightly Gas Company Evening Concert debuted in 1940 and ran continuously for nearly 49 years, 43 of those years with Thomas Cassidy as the sole host. KFAC's core airstaff was itself unchanged between 1953 and 1983.

Cord sold KFAC and FM adjunct KFAC-FM 92.3 to former Cleveland, Ohio, mayor Ray T. Miller in 1962. Following Miller's 1966 death, Atlantic States Industries (ASI) purchased the two stations after successfully petitioning the Federal Communications Commission for a waiver to their FM Non-Duplication Rule. ASI continued to own KFAC until 1987, when subsequent ownership dismissed the majority of the tenured airstaff and cancelled most specialty programming in a controversial attempt to modernize. By the time of their separate sales and format changes in 1989, KFAC and KFAC-FM were two of only 41 stations—out of 9,000 commercial U.S. radio stations in operation—that played classical music. The New York Times eulogized KFAC as "a staple of Los Angeles's cultural life for 58 years".

KWKW itself is Southern California's oldest Spanish language radio station, having launched in 1941 at 1430 AM and moving to 1300 AM in 1950, and has been under Lotus ownership since 1962. KWKW's regional Mexican format and call sign moved to 1330 AM from 1300 AM in 1989 following Lotus' acquisition of the former and sale of the latter. Spanish-language broadcasts of the Los Angeles Dodgers, narrated by Jaime Jarrín, carried over to 1330 AM and were a KWKW staple until 2008. KWKW added the Los Angeles Lakers in 1996, a partnership that helped significantly boost the team's visibility in Los Angeles's Hispanic community; the Lakers continued to be with KWKW through 2025. KWKW dropped all music programming in 1997 in favor of talk radio, then flipped to sports radio in 2005 as an ESPN Deportes Radio affiliate, and switched to TUDN Radio in 2019. KWKW is currently the Spanish language flagship for multiple Los Angeles professional sports franchises including the Rams, Clippers, Kings, Angels and the LA Galaxy. From 2000 to 2025, KTMZ in Pomona simulcast KWKW full-time for the eastern portions of the market.

== KJS and KTBI (1922–1931) ==
The Bible Institute of Los Angeles signed on station KJS on March 22, 1922, operating from their headquarters at Sixth and Hope Streets. Based on its call sign, the station adopted the slogan "King Jesus Saves". KJS was the second religious broadcast station established in the United States, four months after the Church of the Covenant established WDM in Washington, D.C. Not long after going on air, a 1,000-watt transmitter was scheduled to be put into service in October. As KJS was one of fourteen radio stations in operation in the region, a complex time-share arrangement between all stations to operate at 360 meters (830 kHz) was established with preference given to KHJ, itself recently established by the Los Angeles Times. Consequently, KJS only operated for one hour on Sunday mornings, 45 minutes on Sunday evenings and 30 minutes on Wednesday nights at launch. Programming primarily consisted of church services, including from the institute's affiliated Church of the Open Door, though programs from other churches were also featured along with live musical offerings. Charles E. Fuller, who would later become board chairman of the Bible Institute and host of The Old Fashioned Revival Hour, began his radio career at KJS in 1924.

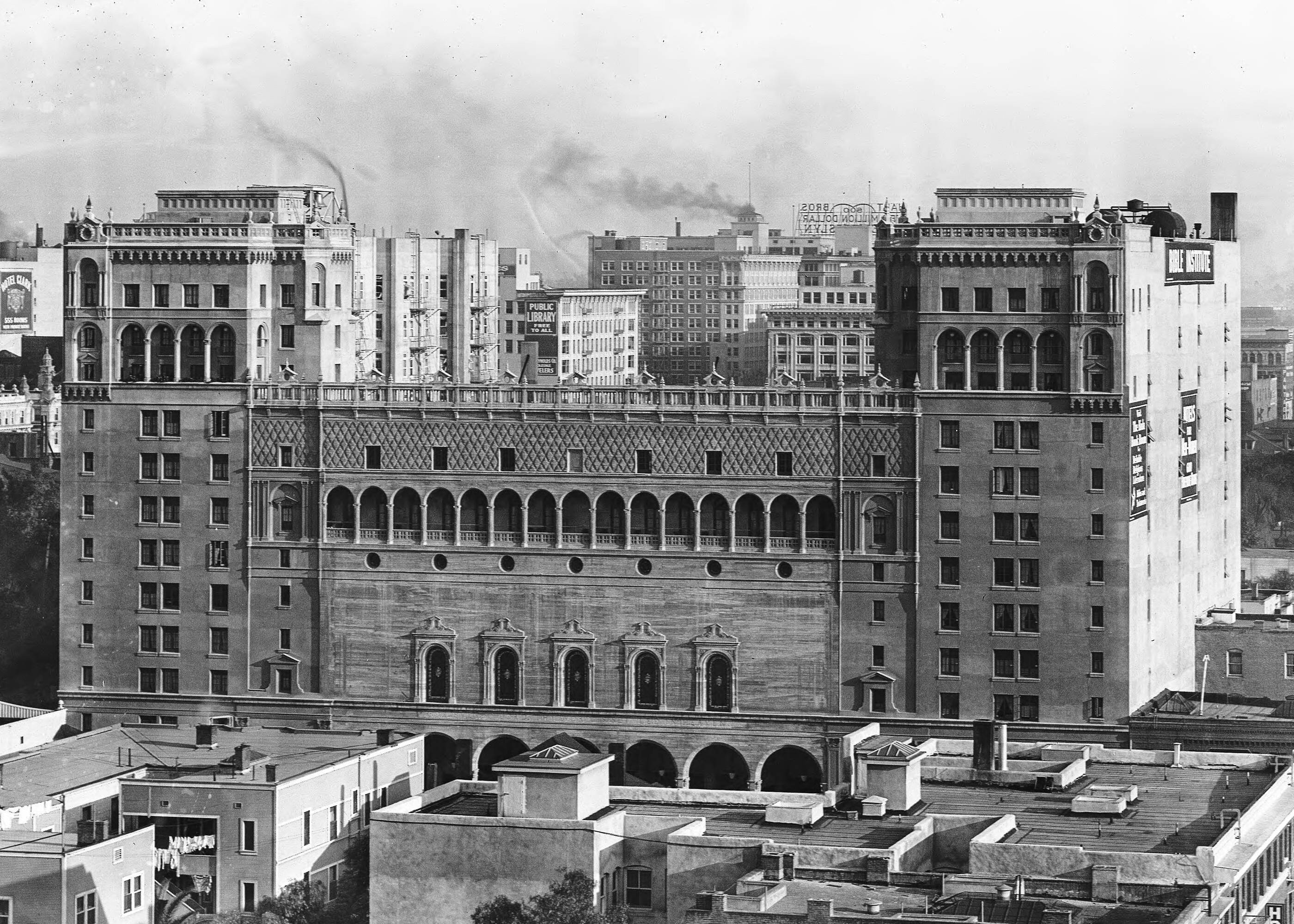
The Bible Institute of Los Angeles's downtown Los Angeles headquarters (pictured in 1916) was also the home for KJS, established by Biola in 1922 and renamed KTBI in 1925.

In August 1925, the station changed its call letters to KTBI to identify the station with The Bible Institute. KTBI's program director in 1927, Herbert G. Tovey, also conducted the institute's women's glee club; the Bible Institute offered a range of music courses to its students. Programming continued to feature the Church of the Open Door, as well as devotionals and a "Jewish Radio Hour", in addition to a daily children's program, Aunt Martha's Children's Hour. The station broadcast on a variety of frequencies—including 830 kHz, 1020 kHz (sharing time with KHJ), 1040 kHz and 1090 kHz—before receiving the 1300 kHz assignment in General Order 40 reallocation. KTBI moved to new studios in June 1928 alongside a power increase to 1,000 watts. General Order 40 paired the station with another religious outlet: KGEF, the station of controversial evangelist Robert P. Shuler and his Trinity Methodist Church.

KTBI operated on a noncommercial basis. As a result, when the Great Depression hit and donations fell, the station became unsustainable for the institute to operate. While oil magnate Lyman Stewart helped found and finance construction of the institute, he failed to endow it prior to his death, exacerbating their financial crisis. Additionally, the Federal Radio Commission (FRC) informed the institute that it preferred religious programs be broadcast over commercially operated stations. In 1931, the Bible Institute sold KTBI for $37,500 (equivalent to $793,900 in 2025) to the Los Angeles Broadcasting Company. Following a brief period of silence for technical repairs, it relaunched as a commercial outlet on April 30 under the KFAC call sign; the KFAC calls had themselves previously been used between 1922 and 1923 on a short-lived station in Glendale, California, owned by the Glendale Daily Press. Along with the sale, the institute continued to have several programs broadcast over the new KFAC and the time share with KGEF was to be maintained.

A very visible reminder of KJS/KTBI's past existence would soon be constructed by the Bible Institute: two large red "Jesus Saves" neon signs on top of their headquarters next to the former transmission tower. Removed after the building's 1988 demolition, the sign was purchased by Gene Scott and placed on the United Artists Theatre in Los Angeles' downtown (renamed "University Cathedral") and later were moved to Glendale along with the ministry's headquarters. A replica sign exists at the current Biola University campus in La Mirada.

== KFAC (1931–1989) ==
=== Move to Wilshire ===
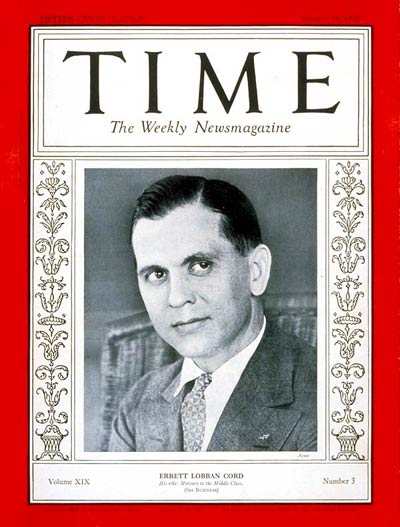
Errett Lobban Cord (pictured on the cover of Time in 1932) was the sole owner of KFAC from 1932 to 1962.

The Los Angeles Broadcasting Company was headed up by Errett Lobban Cord, a manufacturer best known for the Auburn and Cord automobile lines, and by O.R. "Ollie" Fuller, a dairy farmer who owned the Los Angeles dealership for Auburn-Cord, Fuller Motors; accordingly, KFAC stood for "Fuller-Auburn-Cord". Cord and Fuller also had purchased KFVD in Culver City, based at Hal Roach Studios; both they and KFAC would remain at their original sites until both relocated to the Fuller Motors dealership in Wilshire Center, directly adjacent to the Wilshire Community Church. KFAC broadcast a live three-hour program on April 12, 1932, to celebrate the grand opening of the new studios, with on-air talent from competing stations as special guests. As the studios were located in the dealership's fifth floor penthouse, large radio towers were erected on the roof but were purely for display and advertisement purposes as KFAC's actual transmitter site was moved to Los Angeles' Crestview neighborhood. O.R. Fuller and his company went bankrupt prior to completion of the studios in 1932, prompting Cord to acquire KFAC and KFVD outright.

In the wake of the Lindbergh kidnapping, the Associated Press and Los Angeles Times ran stories on March 21, 1934, regarding a kidnapping threat made against E.L. Cord's children. In response, Cord secretly fled with his immediate family to the United Kingdom, the news of his fleeing would not be made known until a New York Times story that May 30, when a company associate only would say that Cord "would remain away for an indefinite period". The full reason for this sudden action was never truly disclosed. KFVD would be spun off to Standard Broadcasting Co. for $50,000 on July 15, 1936, and moved out of the dealership two years later. Cord divested his automotive holdings, which were merged into the Aviation Corporation in 1933, to separate interests in 1937 for $2.5 million.

Starting in 1932, KFAC began broadcasting unlimited time through a series of authorizations under special temporary authority (STA); this arrangement became permanent in January 1933 when the FRC deleted KGEF's license over Shuler's controversial views following a series of failed appeals. This would soon extend to 24-hour broadcasting for KFAC starting on March 8, 1935, joining KGFJ, which broadcast around the clock starting in 1927; both stations preceded WNEW in New York City, which started unlimited broadcasting that August 6. Between 1933 and 1935, the Los Angeles Herald-Express was affiliated with KFAC, though it held no ownership interest; the alliance ended when the newspaper bought KTM in Santa Monica and KELW of Burbank. The station was almost forced to share its frequency again when, in January 1936, a Federal Communications Commission (FCC) hearing examiner approved an application by Los Angeles city councilmember and real estate operator Will H. Kindig for a new shared-time station with KFAC (which would have been renewed for half-time only), saying the proposed Kindig station would increase media diversity in Los Angeles; the FCC broadcast division, however, reversed the examiner's ruling that July. When the North American Regional Broadcasting Agreement (NARBA) was enacted in 1941, KFAC moved to 1330 kHz.

=== Whoa Bill and a springboard to stardom ===
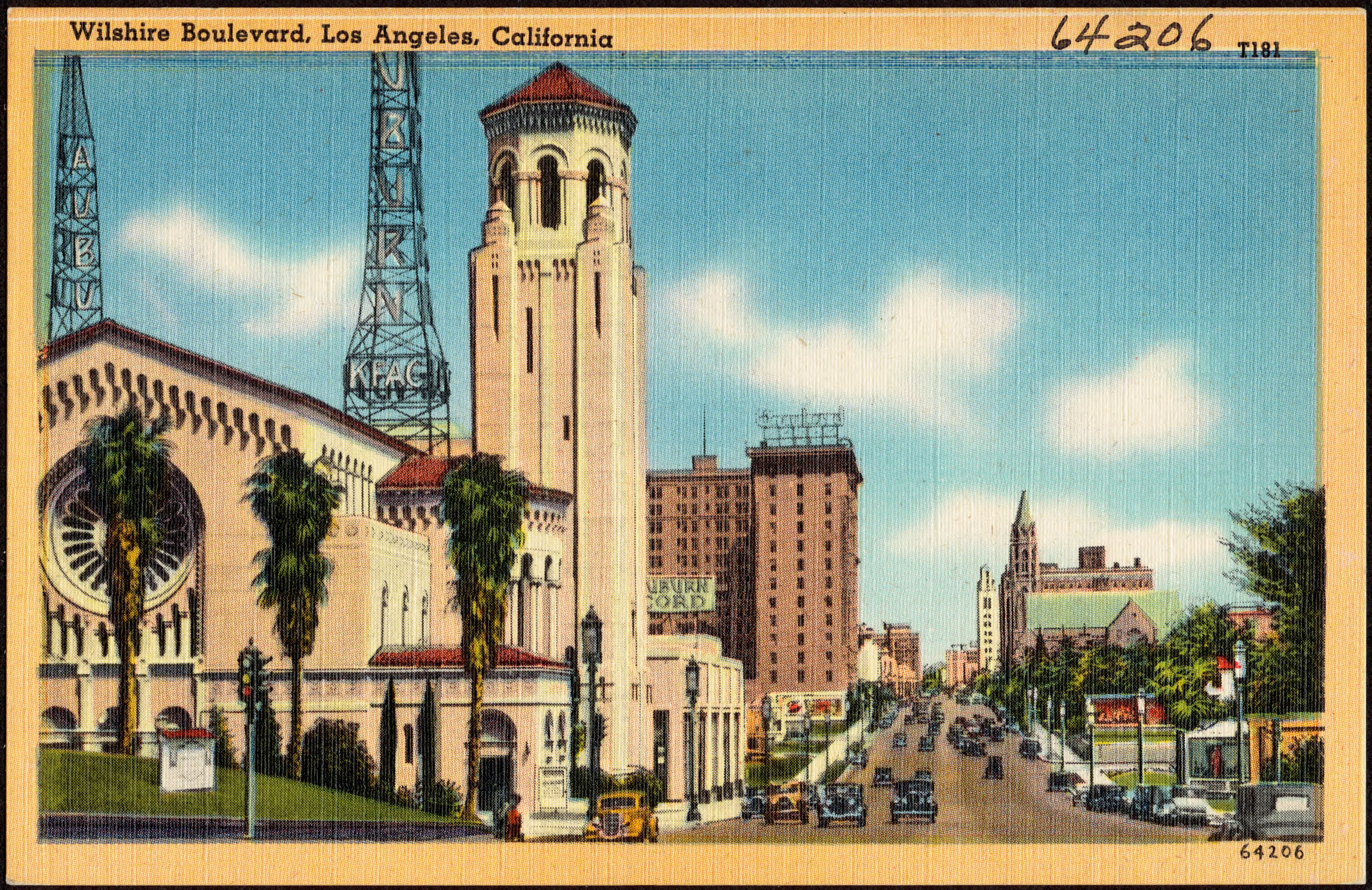
Postcard photo illustration of Wilshire Boulevard in the mid-1930s with the Fuller Motors Auburn-Cord dealership (and penthouse studios for KFAC and KFVD) behind the Wilshire Boulevard Christian Church. The radio towers with "Auburn KFAC" lettering on top of the building existed only for advertising purposes.

Shortly after relaunching as KFAC, on July 30, 1931, an afternoon children's radio program titled the "Whoa Bill" Club debuted, hosted by Harry Jackson with the alternative rural title The Keeper of the Pig, carrying over a show he had previously hosted for four years on KFWB. Sponsored by Bullock's department store, the "Whoa Bill" Club aired every weekday afternoon at 5:30 p.m. for the next 20 years, and found lasting success when Nick Nelson took over as main emcee in 1941 under the name "Uncle Whoa Bill". At its peak, the Bullock's "Whoa Bill" Club boasted a membership of 50,000 fans—known as "Whoa Billers"—in 1944. The show also broadcast live performances every Friday afternoon for a live studio audience of children under the age of 12, Nelson himself also performed weekly puppet shows at Bullock's on Saturday afternoons. Among the child actors who performed on the "Whoa Bill" Club, bobby soxer Louise Erickson found the most fame, having started her professional career at age seven, cast as a fairy princess. Publicist/talent agent Aaron "Red" Doff, who managed the careers of Mickey Rooney, Doris Day, Liberace and Frankie Laine, also was a recurring child actor on the program.

The station also carried games from the Los Angeles Angels of the Pacific Coast League starting with the 1936 season, the majority of which would be recreations produced at their studios. Entertainer Bing Crosby hosted a half-hour "radio rally" over KFAC on November 21, 1937, to promote the upcoming Loyola-Gonzaga college football matchup that included a musical performance by Crosby—a Gonzaga alum—and an on-air debate between Crosby and Times sports editor Bill Henry. KFAC would also debut a popular music program, Lucky Lager Dance Time, on August 1, 1941; hosted by Ira Cook, the late-evening program would later be regarded as one of the first record chart programs of its kind, and even featured conductor Leopold Stokowski as a guest host once.

KFAC would prove to be a springboard for entertainers and performers. Legendary broadcaster Stan Chambers began his career in 1937 as an actor for a weekly children's program produced by one of his teachers at St. Brendan School, visiting the station repeatedly. John Conte started his career in show business as an announcer at KFAC for two years. Frank Bresee, later known for extensive work as a radio actor, historian and archivist, visited the KFAC studios at age 10 for a field trip and was inspired to seek a career in radio. Ann Rutherford began her acting career at KFAC after creating a resume to spite a junior high English teacher who reprimanded her. Barbara Eiler was cast for a KFAC show portraying famous actresses in their teens after being approached by a high school classmate asking if she wanted to act on the radio; that sustaining program led to supporting roles in The Life of Riley and A Day in the Life of Dennis Day, along with various film and television roles. Following a broadcast of the Radio Chautauqua Show in 1936, the station received a phone call from Eddie Cantor inquiring about one of the young girls who performed on the program; Deanna Durbin would become a part of Cantor's radio show and later, a movie star signed to Universal Studios.

=== Classical evolution ===
Comparing Evening Concert in 1947 to a live classical music concert

We open with an overture so people can finish their dishes and sit down in time to catch the symphony. Do you realize that a conductor programs five concerts a year while I have to do six a week? Multiply that by fifty-two and see what you get!

— Thomas Cassidy, KFAC Evening Concert host

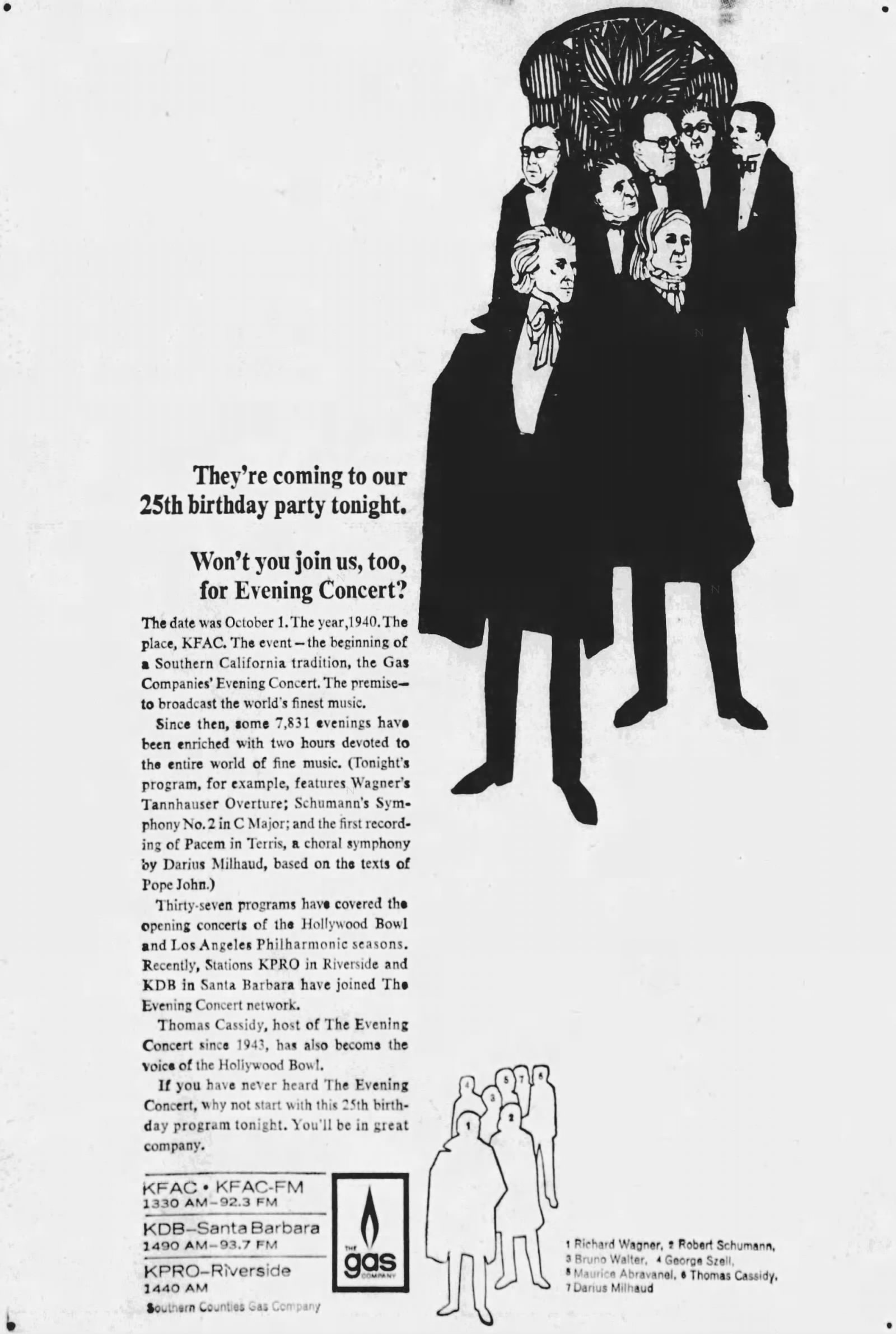
A 25th "birthday party" advertisement for KFAC's Gas Company Evening Concert featuring caricatures of multiple classical music composers including Richard Wagner, Maurice Abravanel and George Szell. Thomas Cassidy, Evening Concert host from 1943 to 1987, is seen standing at far right.

While KFAC later regarded January 15, 1938, as their "birthdate" in the station's 1978 "40th Anniversary" program guide—which was in reality the birthday of then-general manager George Fritzinger—the station began playing recorded classical music on a set schedule with the launch of Concert Hall on October 14, 1935, a daily program narrated by P. Alfred Leonard. Leonard had been hired as KFAC's "director of symphonic music" and promised in a Times interview to lift the station's musical standards with shows devoted to music appreciation. Through the remainder of the 1930s, and indeed on that aforementioned 1938 date, KFAC's program lineup was a mixture of Concert Hall, live and recorded music, Times newscasts, sporting events, the "Whoa Bill" Club and scripted fare.

Their first regularly scheduled long-form classical music program, The Gas Company Evening Concert, debuted on October 1, 1940, and aired six nights a week, Sundays excluded. Having been encouraged by his wife to enter radio broadcasting, Thomas Cassidy joined the station from KIDO in Boise, Idaho, in December 1943 as the host of Evening Concert, a role he would maintain for the next 43 years. Cassidy would become so closely associated with the program that his obituary erroneously regarded his joining the station as when Evening Concert began. KFAC and The Gas Company eventually expanded Evening Concert's reach via regional syndication to both Riverside's KPRO (1440 AM) on January 1, 1958, and Santa Barbara's KDB (1490 AM) by June 1963.

During this transitional period, Steve Allen was hired as an overnight announcer on KFAC in 1943, having been recommended for the job by Madelyn Pugh Davis, who heard him perform on KOY (550 AM) in Phoenix. Allen lasted at the station for only six months in part due to not following directives and his humorous tone not fitting the station's classical selections, but soon landed at KHJ co-hosting Smile Time with Wendell Noble over the Don Lee Network. That program, and a future late-night variety program on the CBS Radio Network, would be precursors to his tenure as the first host of NBC's The Tonight Show franchise.

The success of Evening Concert, as well as Musical Masterpieces, another program hosted by Cassidy, facilitated the station's evolution into a full-time classical music outlet. Harry Mitchell, a former announcer at the Hollywood Palladium, was appointed as program director on July 6, 1944, and pledged to have the station place a greater emphasis on live programming. E.L. Cord allegedly toured the studios one day in 1945 and recognized the substantial investments KFAC had made in classical recordings, finalizing the evolution. While very much still a commercial station, Cord continued to operate KFAC mostly as a personal hobby despite not knowing much about the classical music genre; his own personal tastes and expectations were eventually reflected in the station's on-air presentation that persisted for decades.

=== Unprecedented on-air continuity ===
"Faith in an Idea"

In hectic prewar days when all four network stations were pounding away with chain programs and a dozen locals yacked away all day long between run-of-the-mill records and canned news . . . KFAC raised an eyebrow, cocked an ear, cleared its throat and announced to one and all its now nationally known basic programming policy . . . it proved that it pays to be different and that there's a big exclusive audience for good music . . . and so, KFAC became the Music Station for Southern California, and it still is.

— Excerpt from a KFAC industry trade advertisement, Broadcasting, December 29, 1952

KFAC also was in the process of slowly assembling an airstaff that had an unprecedented level of continuity. Fred Crane, an actor most famous for his supporting role as Brent Tarleton in Gone with the Wind, was hired as a part-time announcer while still continuing to perform on film and television; Fred's position became full-time in the early 1960s. Tom Dixon and Dick Crawford notably were hired on the same date in 1947. Dixon—an Edmonton native who joined the station after simultaneous work at KHJ, KNX (1070 AM) and KMPC (710 AM) emceeing multiple programs, including The Billie Burke Show—served as afternoon announcer for nearly 39 years, while Crawford primarily worked on weekends.

Carl Princi joined the station in 1953 after freelance work at KMGM-FM and a short stint as a bilingual presenter at KWKW (1300 AM). While at KWKW, that station's general manager referred Princi to KFAC's general manager in hopes of securing full-time work; KFAC host Mark Breneman unexpectedly died the day after Princi's job interview, prompting the station to hire him. Referring to himself as "the newest of the old timers", when Princi was interviewed by Hamilton Radio Quarterly in 1976 about his longevity, he replied that "he'd only been there 23 years." Princi hosted The World of Opera every weekday afternoon throughout his entire tenure with the station and conducted most of the station interviews with musicians. Bill Carlson also joined KFAC in 1953 as host of the Noontime Concert, which he presided over for the next 30 years. This core group of Cassidy, Crane, Dixon, Crawford, Princi, and Carlson was fundamentally unchanged between 1953 and 1983.

Pacific Coast League baseball broadcasts, Lucky Lager Dance Time and Uncle Whoa Bill were among the last remaining non-classical programs to remain on the schedule; the baseball games at times wound up delaying the start time for Evening Concert by as much as two hours before being dropped at the end of the 1945 season. Ira Cook began working for both KFAC and KMPC, and even KSL in Salt Lake City, in similar capacities before Lucky Lager Dance Time was cancelled at the end of 1948, Cook would continue the show, itself later supervised by Bill Gavin, at KMPC. Meanwhile, Uncle Whoa Bill—whom Thomas Cassidy's son was a fan of—lasted up to September 14, 1951, when it was quietly dropped from the lineup; Viennese Varieties, sponsored by Baker Boy Bakeries and hosted by Dick Crawford, replaced it the following Monday. Uncle Whoa Bill host Nick Nelson would subsequently join KTTV as the emcee of Mister Whistle, airing at the same time period on Sunday afternoons.

Howard Rhines was hired away from KMPC in 1949 to become KFAC's program director. Under Rhines' oversight, KFAC continued to place a heavy emphasis on sustained programming like Evening Concert and forbade the use of commercial jingles on-air, explaining to Billboard that "you can't go out of Beethoven and into a rhythmic jingle." In addition, all seven staff announcers—including Rhines—were now required to be fluent in at least four distinct languages. KFAC also hired veteran radio announcer/actor Dick Joy as their news director in 1951, handling all newscasts in the morning and some in the early afternoon until 1967.

=== Branching to FM; solidifying the format ===
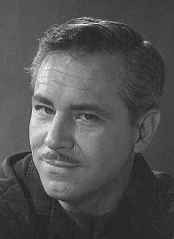
Fred Crane, a KFAC announcer from 1946 until December 31, 1986.

KFAC signed on an FM adjunct, KFAC-FM, on December 29, 1948, at 104.3 MHz. The FM antenna was initially placed at the AM transmitter site, which had moved to the Crenshaw district in 1947 along with a power increase for the AM station to 5,000 watts; this site is still in use today by KWKW, as well as KABC and KFOX. KFAC started carrying live concerts from the Hollywood Bowl amphitheater in 1952 as part of Evening Concert. The station pioneered an early form of stereo broadcasting by having two microphones placed on different sides of the venue, with the audio separately fed to the AM and FM stations. Advertisements placed by The Gas Company encouraged Evening Concert listeners at home who had two radios were instructed to place them seven to twelve feet apart, with one tuned to KFAC-FM and the other tuned to KFAC.

The first such broadcast in 1953 had mixed reviews due to KFAC-FM's relatively weak signal strength; an opinion column in the Redlands Daily Facts concluded their review by publicly advocating for KFAC-FM's antenna to be moved to Mount Wilson alongside the TV stations. KFAC-FM would do just that, filing paperwork with the FCC in March 1954 to move the antenna to Mount Wilson and shifting frequencies from 104.3 MHz to 92.3 MHz, increasing the potential audience by 1.5 million people and the overall coverage area from 720 square miles to 8,300 square miles. While the facility changes took place a few days prior, it was formally dedicated as part of another pseudo-stereo broadcast from the Bowl on July 15, 1954. As KFAC-FM moved to Mount Wilson prior to the FCC enacting limits for power output by FM stations in 1962, it is formally classified as a "superpower" FM by operating at a maximum power level, but with the antenna being placed well above the height limit.

Both KFAC and KFAC-FM would move out of the Fuller Motors dealership penthouse to new studios at the Prudential Square in the Miracle Mile district, now known as SAG-AFTRA Plaza. An advertisement taken out by KFAC in Broadcasting Magazine celebrating the studio move also boasted that they now held a library of music recordings that weighed over 28 tons, enough to ensure that the stations could be programmed for a full year without any duplication. The studio move was completed in April 1953 when KFAC general manager Calvin Smith, Los Angeles Mayor Fletcher Bowron and Prudential Insurance vice president Harry Volk participated in a ceremonial soldering ceremony; KFAC experienced no loss of air time in the process.

As KFAC solidified its reputation and format as a classical music outlet, it also set out to remove some of the few remaining deviations from its format. On February 15, 1957, it notified the First Methodist Church of Los Angeles, which paid commercial rates to broadcast its Sunday morning service over KFAC, that it would terminate the agreement. First Methodist claimed to have the oldest church service broadcasts in America, which were first made in 1923. KFAC carried First Methodist's morning and evening services beginning in 1942; in 1951, the station had removed the evening service from its schedule. After First Methodist asked the FCC for a hearing into the issue, claiming that the cancellation affected the station's commitment at its last license renewal to carry 1.79 percent religious programming, the commission denied the request in May. With the petition denied, the church began airing its services over KPOL.

=== From Cleveland to Atlantic ===
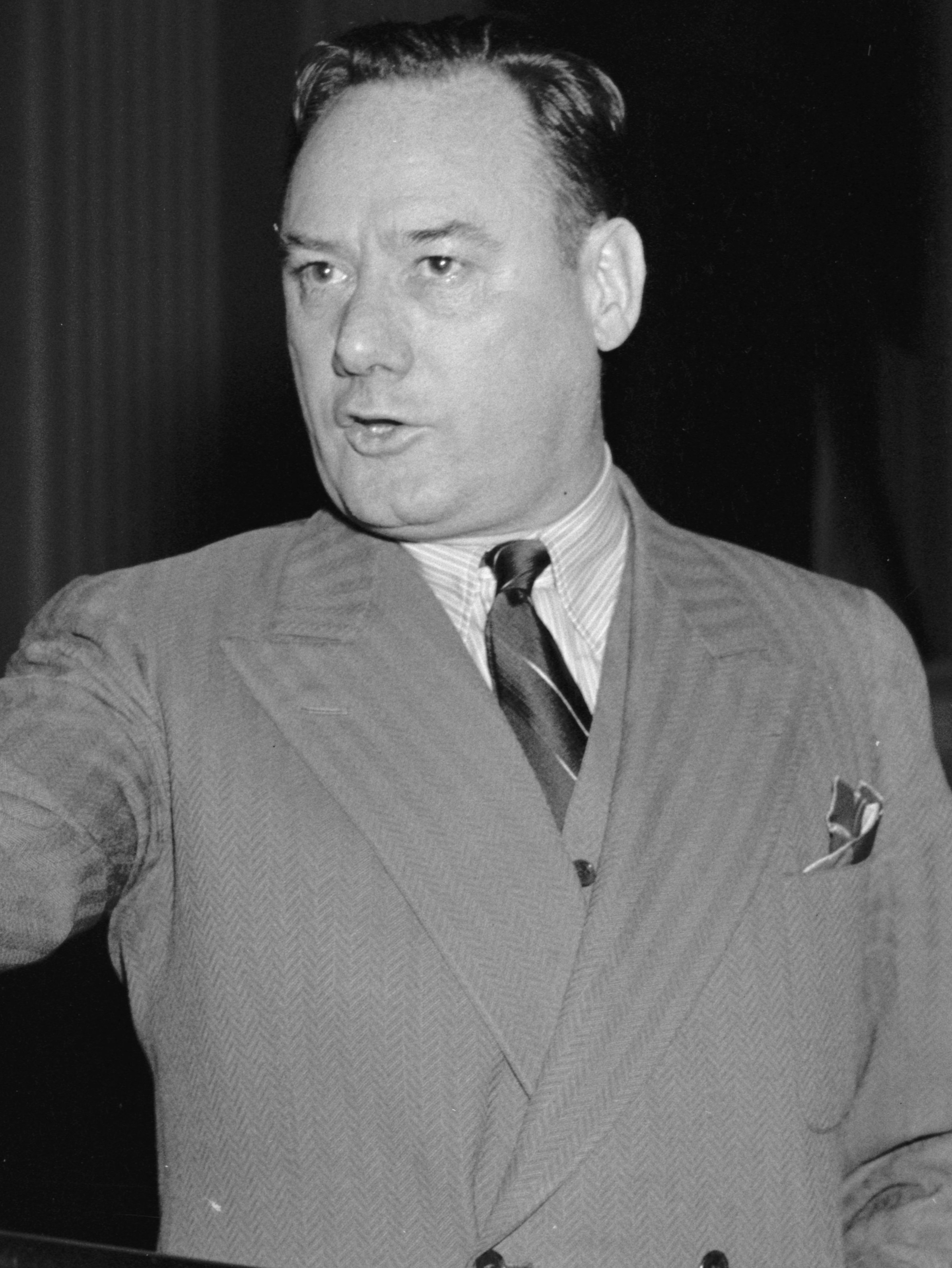
Ray T. Miller, owner of KFAC-AM-FM from 1962 until his 1968 death.

The two stations would remain in E.L. Cord's name until August 1962, when he would sell them to Cleveland Broadcasting Incorporated, headed by former Cleveland, Ohio, mayor Ray T. Miller, for a combined $2 million (equivalent to $21.3 million in 2025). Miller also owned WLEC and WLEC-FM in Sandusky, Ohio, and had founded WERE and WERE-FM in Cleveland, and pledged to maintain KFAC's classical format. The Los Angeles Times would later write of Cord's ownership, "What seems indisputable is that Cord oversaw the station like a benevolent, disinterested patriarch." The pseudo-stereo broadcasts over KFAC and KFAC-FM continued until KFAC-FM converted to stereophonic sound in 1964, at one point, those broadcasts were offered for 12 hours each week. General manager Ed Stevens regarded the $20,000 investment in FM multiplexing as a "big bonanza" for the radio and recording industries, pledging to increase KFAC-FM's stereo output over time; Evening Concert was cited as a program that would be unable to see such a complete stereo conversion due to the volume of titles for that show valued for their initial mono pressings. By 1971, the last remaining program devoted to selections from their original 78 rpm phonograph record collection, Collector's Shelf, was dropped from the schedule.

KFAC at this time boasted weekly concert broadcasts by the Hollywood Bowl Symphony and the Los Angeles Philharmonic, in addition to concert series from the Los Angeles Symphonies' high school and the Los Angeles Art Museum. Another long-running weekday program, Luncheon at the Music Center, debuted in 1965. Taking place every weekday at the Los Angeles Music Center's Pavilion Restaurant, Thomas Cassidy was the program's original host, primarily interviewing classical music artists. Martin Workman became a substitute host in 1973 and succeeded Cassidy as host in 1976, broadening the show's focus to include opera, ballet, operetta and theater.

How Carl Princi and an average listener to KFAC defined music as art

You take (a listener to KFAC) who listens to Brahms or Beethoven and enjoys it thoroughly because it's great romantic music, but he'll hear modern music and he'll be up in arms. I have letters here that are driving me out of my mind because people are accusing us of spending most of our time playing modern classical music, which isn't true but that's the way they see it. So it's ugly. To them it's ugly; to us it's beautiful.

— Carl Princi, KFAC operations manager

Ray T. Miller died on July 13, 1966. One of his sons, Robert Miller, divested his stake in Cleveland Broadcasting Incorporated in April 1968 into an irrevocable trust when he acquired WDBN in Medina, Ohio—but served both the Cleveland and Akron markets—for $1 million, then a record valuation for a full-power FM signal. The following month, Atlantic States Industries (ASI), a subsidiary of McGavren-Guild Radio, purchased the company for a combined $9 million (equivalent to $83.3 million in 2025). Due to ASI already owning five AM stations and one FM station, and because of an interim policy/proposed rule by the FCC prohibiting the purchase of an AM and FM station in the same market—the "one-to-a-customer" policy—KFAC and KFAC-FM would need a waiver in order to be exempted. Both stations purchased two full-page ads in the Los Angeles Times on January 19 and 23, 1969, soliciting listeners to write to KFAC in support of a waiver, claiming that if both stations were separated—even with a forced adoption of separate programming via the FM Non-Duplication Rule—the format would be rendered unsustainable. Approximately 3,000 people sent letters to KFAC in the first few days; by February 9, a total of 15,000 letters were sent in support, including 500 letters from San Bernardino County alone. KFAC then forwarded the letters to the FCC.

The waiver for KFAC and KFAC-FM was ultimately granted by the commission, and the deal was approved on October 29, 1969, on the condition that WERE-FM would be sold "as soon as practicable"; WERE-FM and the Sandusky stations had already been ordered for divestiture instead of either KFAC or KFAC-FM earlier in the process. After initial deals for all three fell through, the Sandusky stations were spun off to a separate entity run by another son of Raymond Miller. General Cinema Corporation acquired WERE-FM in May 1970 for $525,000.

=== The Listeners' Guild and innovative programming ===
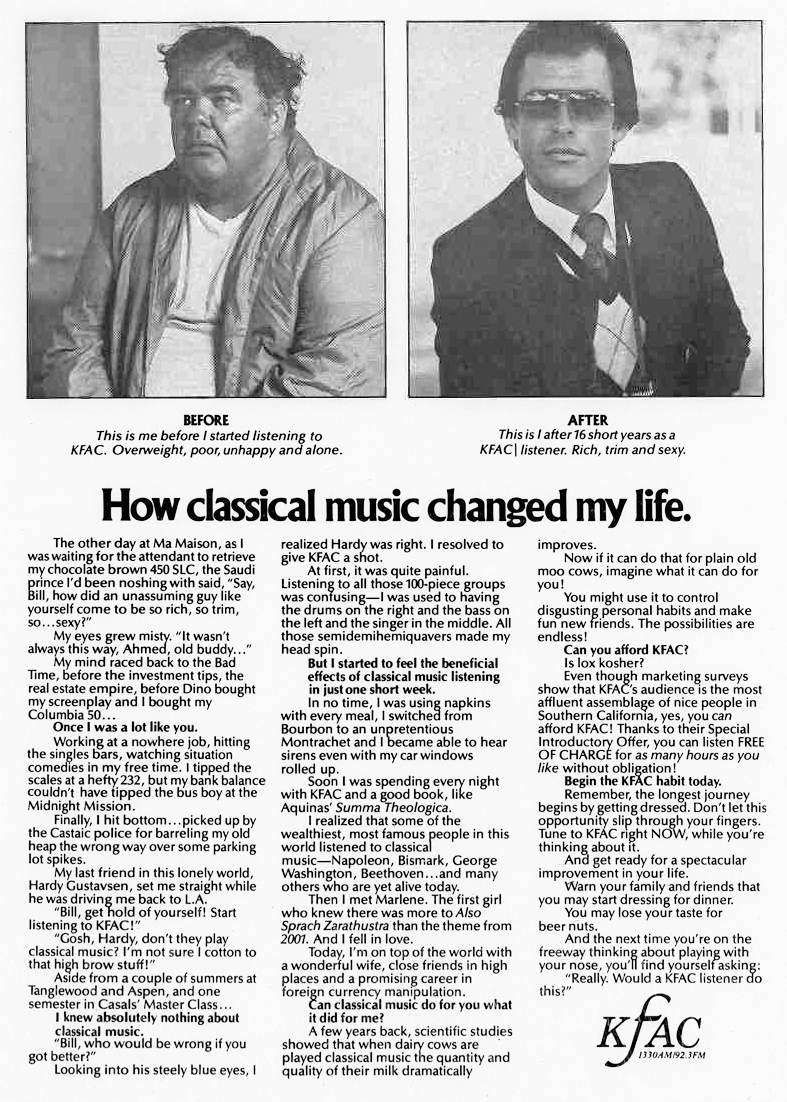
"How classical music changed my life." A 1978 newspaper advertisement for KFAC that poked fun at the station's audience being wealthy, educated and attractive to high-end advertisers.

Despite the arguments presented to the FCC that separate program lineups and philosophies on KFAC and KFAC-FM would be unworkable, the full-time simulcast ended in 1970 with the FM station programmed separately for 18 hours a day; both stations also eschewed "semi-classical" programming in favor of more serious works. Another noticeable change was the adoption of clustered commercial breaks and on-air identifications similar to the Top 40 format, which was claimed to help increase the amount of music the stations could play. The stations also established the KFAC Listeners' Guild in 1970 supported by an annual $3 membership fee, allowing listeners to provide direct feedback to the station and its operations. The Guild boasted over 11,000 paid members within the first year.

On January 17, 1972, under newly installed program director Bernie Alan, the AM station took a more "popular" approach to music selections, playing familiar tunes and melodies with the aim of attracting younger listeners, while KFAC-FM took a more serious approach via a deeper playlist and broader spectrum of selections. Both stations continued to simulcast core programming like Evening Concert, Luncheon at the Lincoln Center, and Continental Classics. All of these changes were not without controversy as a group of listeners filed challenges to KFAC's licenses with the FCC over the newly instituted programming policies. The station settled the dispute by November 1972 by resuming publication of a program guide, seeking to tone down commercials, increasing the variety of selections aired on the AM frequency and ultimately relieving Bernie Alan of his programming duties.

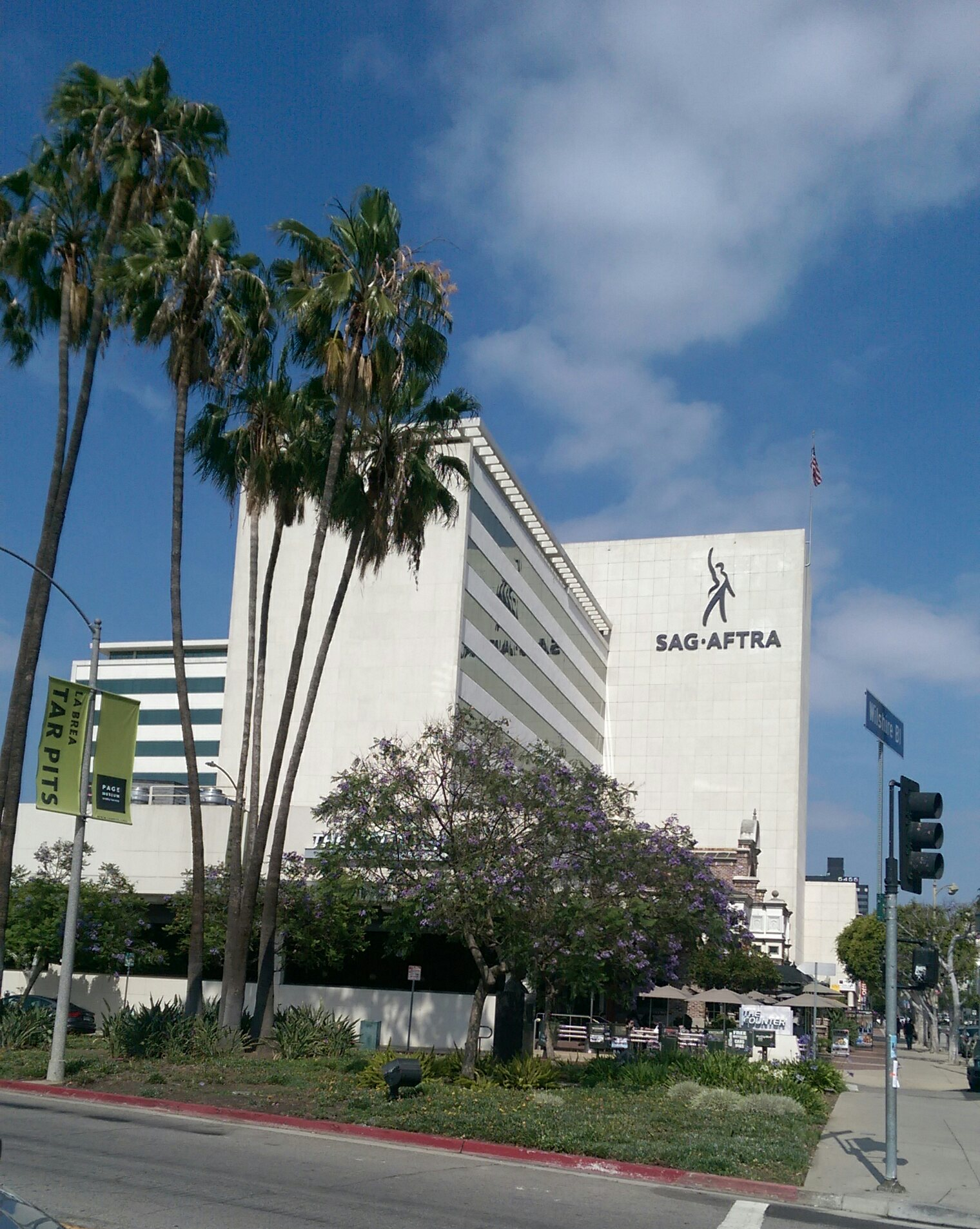
Now known as SAG-AFTRA Plaza, this Miracle Mile building—under the Prudential Square name—housed KFAC's studios from 1953 to 1982.

Clyde Allen, Ph.D. served as KFAC's music director for 14 years in addition to being the music director for the Los Angeles Ballet upon their 1974 formation. Allen wrote and produced multiple documentaries, including a 12-hour KFAC retrospective that aired over both stations on January 14, 1979. Billed as celebrating "40 years of classical music programming," with an assortment of interviews, airchecks from past programs and other archival material, it was a largely apocryphal marketing promotion. After moving studios from Prudential Square to the former Villa Capri restaurant on Hollywood's Yucca Street in 1982, KFAC unveiled a large mural painted by Thomas Surlyz outside of the station building on Christmas Day, 1983, showing their long-tenured airstaff cavorting with their respective favorite historical composers.

The station formally broke the glass ceiling in May 1985 with actress Lynne Warfel's hiring as the station's first female staff announcer; Carl Princi explained he had to wait several years for a job opening among the heavily tenured all-male staff. Despite this distinction, Nicola Lubitsch—daughter of movie director Ernst Lubitsch—had an on-air tryout to be a regular station announcer, with later press accounts erroneously attributing her as the first female announcer, but management opted to hire Warfel. Moreover, Leonora Schildkraut had been the first female to host a regularly scheduled program over KFAC in 1972 with the youth-oriented Through the Looking Glass. Co-produced by the Los Angeles Board of Education for additional use within the city's school district, this weekly show won KFAC its lone Peabody Award in 1974. Gertrude "Gussie" Moran also began a short-lived daily sportscast over KFAC on May 8, 1972, becoming the second female radio sportscaster in the city after KNX's Jane Chastain.

KFAC would continue to develop different specialty shows. Global Village debuted in 1971 and aired for two hours every Friday night; developed by Dennis Parnell, it was a "mosaic program concept" that included selections of any type of music, along with poetry and other readings. After Dennis Parnell left the station, KCSN host Doug Ordunio assumed several of Parnell's duties, taking over Global Village's production and provided the impetus for other shows. Those shows included: Soundscape, simulcast over both stations, with no set format but the intent to display similarities between different music styles, along with discussions over the selections by Fred Crane; At Home With, featuring interviews recorded at the homes of classical musical celebrities who lived in Southern California; The Circular Path, a set of five four-hour specials surrounding music concepts and forms which would eventually repeat themselves; and Making Waves, a weekly program of new-age music. Soundscape replaced a self-titled show hosted by Skip Weshner that ran from 1973 to 1979, Weshner would return to the station in 1983 to host the show again for one additional year. Ordunio also became a staff announcer in 1981 hosting Artsline, a daily call-in talk show devoted to the arts that aired exclusively on the AM frequency.

=== Dismissing the "KFAC Old Guard" ===
Because publicity is rather obscure in our pursuit of broadcasting the classics--we are not, after all, your typical day-to-day hot copy--we felt more or less like anonymous creatures. I have actually received more recognition by being fired than at almost any other time in my career. I had no idea that so many people considered me a part of their daily lives.

— Tom Dixon, former KFAC host

Classic Communications, Inc., a group of investors headed by Louise Heifetz—the daughter-in-law of violin virtuoso Jascha Heifetz—purchased the two stations from ASI on April 8, 1986, for $33.5 million (equivalent to $98.4 million in 2025); KFAC executive vice president/sales manager Edward Argow was also a part of the group and was named chief operating officer. At age 57, Ralph Guild, the head of ASI, thought it was time to sell KFAC. When the sale closed on December 17, program director Carl Princi announced his departure effective January 1, 1987, KUSC executive Robert Goldfarb was appointed as his replacement; while Heifetz did mention some program changes would take place, she denied KFAC would change format. In a shocking move, however, Princi, Tom Dixon, Fred Crane, Martin Workman, Doug Ordunio and A. James Liska were all fired outright on December 31, 1986, along with most of the engineering staff. Dixon notably was dismissed in the middle of his airshift, while Workman was fired immediately after his show ended; The Gas Company Evening Concert was the lone show retained on the schedule due to being a sponsored program under a separate contract. Evening Concert host Thomas Cassidy himself retired from full-time duties on February 7.

Los Angeles Times commentary excerpt on KFAC's mass firings

In retrospect, the multi-decade tenure of Crane and Dixon and Princi must stand as one of the airwaves' major miracles. And that's just the point. These men deserve a better fate... all that's missing here is a simple show of respect. Not just for the announcers who've lost their jobs, but for the thousands of listeners who feel they've lost some old friends.

— Marc Shulgold, January 15, 1987

Robert Goldfarb publicly re-positioned KFAC as "100% classical", eschewing jazz selections and Broadway show tunes, with a younger airstaff consisting of Mary Fain from Seattle's KING-FM, KUSC announcer Rich Capparela, KFAC part-timer John Santana, returning staffer Bernie Alan and Martin Perlich. KFAC also cancelled Adventures in Good Music and dropped their Mutual Broadcasting System affiliation. Jeff Pollack, a programming consultant famously associated with album-oriented rock stations, signed a contract to consult KFAC. Heifetz and Argow defended the moves by saying that KFAC's programming scope needed to be broadened in order to attract younger listeners and improve perennially low Arbitron ratings, and the tenured airstaff just didn't fit their plans. One month later, KMET's entire airstaff was dismissed and format changed outright due to declining ratings of their own, echoing Heifetz and Argow's rationale. This was still a major departure from prior ASI management who regarded KFAC's audience as wealthy, educated and attractive to loyal high-end advertisers, a belief supported by the fact KFAC never operated with a financial loss.

The firings and programming adjustments were met with a generally negative response from the public and dismay among the fired personnel. A commentary piece for the Los Angeles Times by Marc Shulgold noted how he had an "unsettling experience" while listening to the revamped format and concluded by saying the fired air talent and their listeners all deserved a better fate. For their part, Carl Princi, Tom Dixon and Fred Crane all told the Times that Heifetz, Goldfarb and Argow badly misjudged the station's audience and predicted that KFAC's ratings and revenue would suffer as a result, while Dixon noted the outpouring of support from listeners upset at his removal far exceeded the recognition he received at any other point in his career. The dismissed announcers would subsequently file an age-discrimination lawsuit against KFAC and prevailed in court.

== The end of KFAC ==
KFAC and KFAC-FM were sold in two separate deals for a combined $63.7 million. After being put on the market in April 1988, KFAC was sold to Lotus Communications for $8.7 million (equivalent to $23.7 million in 2025) on July 15. Just before that deal closed on January 17, 1989, KFAC-FM was subsequently sold to Evergreen Media for $55 million (equivalent to $143 million in 2025). The FM alone set a record for the most expensive sale of a classical music outlet in the United States. At the end, just five percent of KFAC-AM-FM's combined total audience listened to the AM frequency, which is why it was sold off first; even though KFAC-FM was not on the market, the offer made by Evergreen was high enough that it prompted Classic Communications to consider selling.

Immediately, the news of the KFAC-FM sale in particular raised alarms from industry experts that the station was about to exit the classical format. While Evergreen head Scott Ginsberg initially told Radio & Records that the station's format would remain in place, American Radio publisher James Duncan Jr. warned, "Classical radio stations are not in vogue. What's in vogue is FM stations in Los Angeles", saying that Evergreen would have no choice but to change formats in order to make the revenue needed to pay the debt service incurred in acquiring KFAC-FM. After months of speculation, Evergreen donated the music library from both stations, estimated at 50,000 recordings, to KUSC, along with a $35,000 check; Stanford University and the Los Angeles Public Library acquired KFAC's compact disc library, the majority of titles KUSC already held. KUSC also acquired the programming rights to the Philadelphia Orchestra and the Texaco Metropolitan Opera broadcasts.

Opening to Rich Capparela's KFAC farewell speech

While it is too late to save KFAC, I believe that we should be able to draw a lesson from this passing, and turn this event into something good. I know that there are some who would say, "well, what's the big deal? We've got bigger problems to deal with!" And to people like that, and if you're thinking that way, I say this: if you want to make this country a better place to live in...you can start with nothing more important than the arts. Now, I'm not just talking here about classical music... literature, architecture, dance: the humanities. The humanities and a study of things greater than themselves is the most important way to impress people–especially young people!–of their place. Of their worth.

— Rich Capparela, September 20, 1989

KFAC's demise was seen as the end of an era in Los Angeles. In July, KPFK held a two-hour program that served as an "early wake" for KFAC, during which 20 listeners called into the station. KCRW presented a three-hour documentary—titled "KFAC: Requiem for a Radio Station"—hosted by Nicola Lubitsch with appearances from Fred Crane, Carl Princi, Thomas Cassidy and Tom Dixon, and a look back at KFAC's history. The Los Angeles Times editorial board mused on the pending switch, noting the dubious distinction of Los Angeles becoming the only major American city without a commercial classical music radio station, and advocated for another station in the market to adopt the format. Mount Wilson FM Broadcasters' KKGO-FM had already announced the adoption of classical programming during the daytime starting in January 1990, with its existing jazz format being transferred to KKGO (540 AM). Mount Wilson chairman Saul Levine expressed interest in acquiring the entire KFAC music library, but abandoned the offer when presented with a $1 million asking price; newly appointed general manager Jim de Castro—who joined the station in March from Evergreen's Chicago outlet WLUP and presided over the station's music library donations—denied seeking that amount, but that two appraisers valued the collection at upwards of $1.8 million.

Meanwhile, new ownership capitalized on the attention to begin teasing 92.3's next format. The station carried part of a Rolling Stones press conference in Los Angeles in mid-July, and in August, it paid for a billboard on Sunset Boulevard reading, "Pirate Radio, KLSX, KLOS: Get Ready to Move Over and Let the Big Dogs Eat!" While published reports speculated that the station was to call itself "KBDE" as an acronym for "Big Dogs Eat", James de Castro admitted to Radio & Records that the Sunset Boulevard billboard installation only came about after he won a bet playing golf, providing him (and Evergreen) full use of it for a full month. The earlier warnings posited by James Duncan Jr. and the dismissed KFAC personnel would become prophetic, as de Castro told The New York Times that KFAC suffered a significant decline in advertising revenue that rendered the format economically impossible to continue. Evergreen hired Liz Kiley from KOST as program director for the replacement format; despite her background in adult contemporary and contemporary hit radio, Kiley ordered for the station several AOR-related syndicated radio specials. De Castro also expressed surprise in a Los Angeles Times interview that no organized effort to challenge the format change ever materialized, even as the station received a steady amount of protest letters and phone calls.

While the station had prepared a final schedule of music programming for the entire month of September 1989, the switch ended up occurring mid-month, as had been anticipated. That schedule for the last two days of the month was to have included, at the end of every air shift, Haydn's "Farewell" Symphony. The soon-to-be-dismissed airstaff made pointed references on-air to the station's demise in the days leading up to it; Rich Capparela compared it to an execution by firing squad before reading a weather forecast, while after playing Tchaikovsky's Symphony No. 6, Mary Fain said that the piece was "composed just a few months before his death, and played just a few hours before ours at KFAC." The classical music station in San Diego, KFSD, ran advertising on KFAC promoting itself as "classical music for San Diego—and now for Orange County". At the same time, Evergreen took out local ads on L.A. Law, the 1989 MTV Movie Awards, and The Arsenio Hall Show that teased the new station.

At noon on September 20, 1989, KUSC, which had also placed advertising for its classical offerings on KFAC in the final days, simulcast the final hour of KFAC's classical programming. This included Jim de Castro ceremoniously "passing a baton" to KUSC general manager Wallace Smith, followed by a farewell message from Rich Capparela, who would rejoin KUSC's airstaff; the hour concluded with KFAC-FM's final classical selection—the "Farewell" Symphony—and a moment of silence led by de Castro. At 1 p.m., after 60 seconds of silence, the FM station began stunting with heartbeat sounds, interspersed with brief snippets of rock songs, ahead of the debut of KKBT "The Beat" the next day. The mural of KFAC's core airstaff outside of the Villa Capri studios was eventually painted over and an outdoor "wall of fame" of brass plaques honoring classical music composers was supplanted by a series of plaques honoring contemporary music artists.

The KFAC call letters, which were also donated to KUSC, were placed on the former KSCA, KUSC's repeater in Santa Barbara.

== KWKW (1989–present) ==
=== KWKW moves to 1330 ===
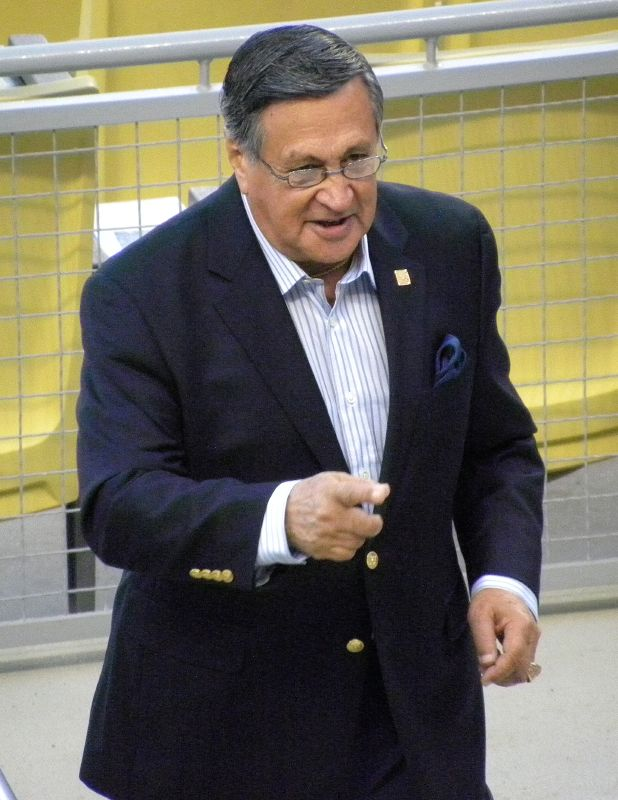
Jaime Jarrín, former Spanish-language play-by-play announcer for the Los Angeles Dodgers and associated with KWKW from 1955 until 2007

In contrast to the FM, the AM station would have a more straightforward fate. In order to facilitate their acquisition of KFAC and comply with then-existing FCC regulations, Lotus divested their existing Los Angeles AM property, KWKW (1300 AM) in Pasadena, to NetworksAmerica—headed by former KFAC station manager George Fritzinger—for $4.5 million (equivalent to $12.3 million in 2025); paperwork filed with the FCC showed Classic Communications purchasing KWKW from Lotus for the same dollar amount then acting as the seller. Lotus retained the KWKW call letters, all on and off-air personnel, programming, and history; the previous KWKW, owned by Lotus since 1962, was Southern California's oldest Spanish-language outlet, which had been broadcasting since 1941 and operated on the 1300 AM facility since 1950 following a similar asset/license swap. KWKW had been owned by Lotus since 1962 and was the first station to be purchased by the nascent broadcast chain.

On January 14, 1989, KFAC's call letters were changed to KWKW, and the programming heard on the previous KWKW effectively "moved" from 1300 to 1330, representing a coverage boost improving reception in the San Fernando Valley. In the process, a British comedy program known as Cynic's Choice hosted by Brian Clewer, which had aired only on the AM frequency since 1971, was displaced. NetworksAmerica concurrently changed the former KWKW's call letters to KAZN and relaunched it as an Asian radio station—the first such radio station to operate in the Los Angeles area. With the switch to 1330 AM, KWKW expanded its focus on regional Mexican music (including mariachi and banda), calling itself "La Mexicana". It also brought with it its sports coverage, which included Spanish-language broadcasts of the Los Angeles Dodgers and Los Angeles Raiders. Dodgers broadcasts were headed up by play-by-play announcer Jaime Jarrín, a position he has held continuously since the 1959 season; Jarrín began working at KWKW in 1955 as a news reporter. The station was further recognized by the National Association of Broadcasters as 1992's Spanish-language station of the year during their annual Marconi Radio Awards. That same year, Jim Kalmenson of Lotus attributed the success of KWKW to an audience that preferred tradition over change and needed a source of community information.

In 1994, new program director Alberto Vera shuffled the station's lineup, leading to the resignations of several members of the air staff and protests from listeners; Vera sought to make the station better for family listening and reduce the number of double entendres heard on the air. KWKW experimented with a talk format in 1995 but could not fully commit to it because of contracts relating to the hosts of its music-driven shows. On August 11, 1997, KWKW left its regional Mexican music format and became just the second Spanish-language all-talk station in the United States (KTNQ was the first). It was the only Spanish-language radio station in the United States to send a crew to cover the 1998 visit of Pope John Paul II to Cuba. In 2000, Arbitron surveys showed its listenership included the oldest and wealthiest Spanish speakers in the area; its programming, in addition to the Dodgers, included a live call-in show on immigration topics (Inmigración 1330) and hourly newscasts covering Mexican and Central American news. In 1996, the station became the Spanish-language flagship of the Los Angeles Lakers in Kobe Bryant's rookie season, timing that was credited with helping the Lakers cement themselves as the most important sports franchise in the Los Angeles Hispanic market.

Lotus acquired KWPA (1220 AM), a 250-watt station in Pomona, from Multicultural Broadcasting in 1999 for $750,000 (equivalent to $1.45 million in 2025). Lotus renamed it KWKU and converted it to a simulcast of KWKW's sports programming improving reception in Pomona and Ontario, in addition to serving as an overflow station for KWKW sports coverage; KWKU also exclusively carried broadcasts of the Los Angeles Sparks of the WNBA. The KWKU nominal main studio in Pomona would prove critical to getting KWKW back on the air on December 6, 2001, when a major fire at the Sunset Vine Tower, home to the Lotus cluster, caused extensive electrical damage to the building, which was deemed unsafe by fire officials. 105 computers, mixers and other equipment were carted out of the building, and John Cooper, the chief engineer for Lotus Los Angeles, drove them to Pomona, where the station was back on the air in six hours. As a result of the extensive damage, Lotus relocated temporarily to the recently vacated KTNQ studios and later purchased a building near Universal Studios Hollywood to be fitted out for its operation.

In 2003, Armando Aguayo—today one of the radio voices of Los Angeles FC, heard in Spanish on KWKW's sister station KFWB—got his start in the market on KWKW.

=== ESPN Deportes and Tu Liga Radio ===
I'm excited (about the Dodgers' new radio contract)... it's fantastic. But I was with KWKW for 51 years and a little bit of my heart will always be with KWKW.

— Jaime Jarrín, on the Dodgers' Spanish language radio flagship changing from KWKW to KHJ for the 2008 season

On October 1, 2005, KWKW went full-time as a Spanish-language sports station, the flagship of a new radio network, ESPN Deportes Radio. At the time, the station also carried Chivas USA games. However, the station's relationship with the Dodgers—which had been on KWKW from 1958 to 1972 and then again beginning in 1986—ended after the 2007 season, when the franchise, citing its dislike of soccer preemptions that could have happened under the station's new deal to carry LA Galaxy games, opted to sign with KHJ. The Galaxy deal was arranged after David Beckham signed a landmark contract with the MLS club, boosting the club and leagues' visibility on an international scale. Consequently, the station inked a five-year contract to become the Spanish-language flagship of the Los Angeles Angels, but Jaime Jarrín remained with the Dodgers broadcast team, ending a 51-year long run at KWKW as both a news reporter and sportscaster. Current Galaxy announcer Rolando 'Veloz' González has credited Jarrín with helping him get a start in U.S. broadcasting after immigrating from his native Guatemala.

Along with the Galaxy coverage, the station has carried the FIFA World Cup; while coverage of the 2006 edition was in Spanish, KWKW carried most of ESPN Radio's English-language coverage of the 2010 edition, allowing ESPN Radio affiliates KSPN and KLAA to continue with their normal program schedules. In 2018, the station contracted with Fútbol de Primera, the national soccer radio network that holds World Cup rights, to exclusively produce coverage for KWKW. KWKW and Fútbol de Primera teamed up again in 2019 to broadcast the first ever Spanish-language U.S. radio coverage of the FIFA Women's World Cup.

KWKW also was the Spanish flagship of the Los Angeles Avengers of the Arena Football League until the team folded in April 2009. Also in 2009, KWKW added the other NBA team in Los Angeles, the Clippers, to its rights portfolio, carrying 48 games in the first season. In 2016, KWKW became the Spanish-language home of the Los Angeles Rams, heading up a multi-station network that also includes Lotus's Spanish sports outlet in Las Vegas, KENO. Two years later, the station picked up 10 games of the Los Angeles Kings—the first time in 20 years that any of the NHL team's games were broadcast in Spanish. With Francisco X. Rivera and Nano Cortes as the announcers, this addition coincided with the Kings moving their English-language coverage onto the iHeartRadio platform; the team evaluated the KWKW partnership's viability through social media feedback and interactions. The relationship was renewed for the 2019–20 season, with 12 home games airing on KWKW.

When ESPN Deportes ended operations on September 8, 2019, KWKW affiliated with TUDN Radio, another Spanish-language sports network operated by Univision, airing its programming on nights and weekends. KWKW did not learn of the network's folding until it was publicly announced; general manager Jim Kalmenson said that ESPN Deportes programming was largely supplemental to the station's local sports talk programming which earned higher ratings. The station also rebranded to Tu Liga (Your League) reflecting the addition of Liga MX soccer to the lineup via TUDN Radio's play-by-play. Along with the switch, prior TUDN affiliate KTNQ—itself owned by Univision—switched back to a talk format.

KTMZ was taken silent in December 2025; Lotus cited in their STA filing with the FCC that KTMZ experienced a loss in advertising revenue due to the second Trump administration's immigration policies towards Spanish-speaking residents. On December 15, 2025, the Lakers announced the flagship rights for the Lakers Spanish-language network would be transferred to KFWB, ending a nearly 30-year association with KWKW.

== Programming ==
=== Weekdays and weekends ===
KWKW airs news and sports programming during the day. In morning drive, the station airs a three-hour newscast, 1330 Informa (1330 Reports). Local sports programming on KWKW includes Mi Raza...Tu Liga with Rafael Ramos Villagrana, Mario Amaya, and Armando Aguayo in early afternoons; the latter two also host SuperGol with Armando Aguayo, Troy Santiago and Mario Amaya in late afternoons. TUDN Radio programming airs on nights and weekends.

There are several non-sports specialty programs that air on KWKW, notably on Saturdays when the station airs eight hours of specialty programs under the banner Sábados Centroamericanos (Central American Saturdays). On weekdays, KWKW broadcasts a health program, Nutrición al Día (Nutrition Today), hosted by Dr. Neyda Carballo-Ricardo.

=== Play-by-play ===
KWKW is currently the flagship of a multi-station Spanish-language network for the Los Angeles Rams (NFL) featuring play-by-play announcer Troy Santiago and color analyst Ricardo López. All games from the LA Galaxy (MLS) are broadcast exclusively on KWKW with play-by-play announcer Rolando 'Veloz' González, whose involvement with the team dates back to 1996.

KWKW also airs Spanish-language play-by-play of the following teams: the Los Angeles Angels (MLB) with announcer José Tolentino, the Los Angeles Clippers (NBA) with announcer Armando Garcia and the Los Angeles Kings (NHL) with announcer Francisco X. Rivera. Select coverage of Liga MX matches are broadcast on KWKW via TUDN Radio. Co-owned KFWB also carries select play-by-play from the aforementioned teams in the event of schedule conflicts.

== FM translator ==
In 2017, KWKW began broadcasting on an FM translator, K264CQ (100.7 FM), which has its transmitter mounted to one of KWKW's AM towers.

Broadcast translator for KWKW
Call sign	Frequency	City of license	FID	ERP (W)	HAAT	Class	Transmitter coordinates	FCC info
K264CQ	100.7 FM	Los Angeles	141734	60 (vert.)	110 m (361 ft)	D	34°01′10″N 118°20′45″W	LMS

Signal contours for KWKW and associated translator and repeater.; KWKW (1330 AM); K264CQ (100.7 FM); KTMZ (1220 AM, closed 2025)

== See also ==
- List of initial AM-band station grants in the United States
