= 1330 AM =

AM radio frequency

The following radio stations broadcast on AM frequency 1330 kHz: 1330 AM is a Regional broadcast frequency.

== In Argentina ==
- LRI237 in Rosario, Santa Fe

== In Canada ==
Call sign	City of license	Daytime power (kW)	Nighttime power (kW)	Transmitter coordinates
CJBW	Jans Bay, Saskatchewan	0.05	0.05	55.1483°N 108.127°W
CJYM	Rosetown, Saskatchewan	10	10	51.458611°N 107.994444°W

== In Mexico ==
- XECSEZ-AM in Jalpa, Zacatecas
- XEEV-AM in Izúcar de Matamoros, Puebla

== In the United States ==
Call sign	City of license	Facility ID	Class	Daytime power (kW)	Nighttime power (kW)	Unlimited power (kW)	Transmitter coordinates
KCKM	Monahans, Texas	35048	B	12	1		31.645833°N 103.001111°W
KGAK	Gallup, New Mexico	23050	B	5	1		35.542778°N 108.736389°W
KGLD	Tyler, Texas	24246	D	1	0.077		32.376389°N 95.265278°W
KGRG	Enumclaw, Washington	14061	D	0.5	0.026		47.214722°N 121.971944°W
KINE	Kingsville, Texas	14018	B	1	0.28		27.61°N 97.795°W
KJPR	Shasta Lake City, California	129174	B	1	1		40.68°N 122.266944°W
KLBS	Los Banos, California	19801	B	0.42	5		37.0975°N 120.830833°W
KNSS	Wichita, Kansas	53152	B	5	5		37.713056°N 97.2475°W
KOVE	Lander, Wyoming	22624	B	5	0.25		42.842778°N 108.744722°W
KPTY	Waterloo, Iowa	51662	B	5	5		42.466944°N 92.266389°W
KTON	Cameron, Texas	42367	D	2.4	0.13		31.112222°N 97.296667°W
KVOL	Lafayette, Louisiana	9415	B	5	1		30.241389°N 92.058611°W
KWKW	Los Angeles, California	38454	B	5	5		34.019444°N 118.345556°W
KXXJ	Juneau, Alaska	161171	B	10	3		58.301389°N 134.440556°W
KYOZ	Spokane, Washington	65985	D	5	0.023		47.615833°N 117.365°W
WAEW	Crossville, Tennessee	14619	D	1	0.035		35.950278°N 85.035833°W
WBGW	Evansville, Indiana	24138	B	5	1		38.0525°N 87.595278°W
WBTM	Danville, Virginia	52544	B	5	1		36.607222°N 79.433611°W
WCVC	Tallahassee, Florida	71303	D	3.2	0.026		30.509444°N 84.335278°W
WEBO	Owego, New York	71398	D	5	0.036		42.0925°N 76.256667°W
WEBY	Milton, Florida	64	D	25	0.079		30.518056°N 87.082222°W (daytime); 30.62°N 87.0225°W (nighttime)
WENA	Yauco, Puerto Rico	61257	B	2	1.4		18.034444°N 66.863333°W
WESR	Onley-Onancock, Virginia	18385	D	5	0.051		37.717222°N 75.683056°W
WETZ	New Martinsville, West Virginia	26514	D	1	0.059		39.6575°N 80.859444°W
WFIN	Findlay, Ohio	5848	D	1	0.079		41.008333°N 83.635278°W
WFNN	Erie, Pennsylvania	26611	B	5	5		41.992222°N 80.028889°W
WGFT	Campbell, Ohio	74164	D	0.5			41.089167°N 80.615278°W
WGTJ	Murrayville, Georgia	23911	D	1			34.371111°N 83.946389°W
WHAZ	Troy, New York	8674	D	1	0.049		42.776389°N 73.686111°W
WHBL	Sheboygan, Wisconsin	9967	B	5	1		43.720556°N 87.734444°W
WHGM	Havre de Grace, Maryland	35120	D	1	0.018		39.565278°N 76.118889°W
WHNK	Marion, Virginia	19478	D	1	0.031		36.856111°N 81.505°W (daytime); 36.819722°N 81.47°W (nighttime)
WINT	Willoughby, Ohio	26221	D	0.5	0.042		41.649167°N 81.423611°W
WJNX	Fort Pierce, Florida	20437	B	5	1		27.455556°N 80.367222°W
WKDP	Corbin, Kentucky	19815	D	5	0.016		36.938889°N 84.078889°W
WKTA	Evanston, Illinois	52909	D	5	0.11		42.139444°N 87.885278°W
WLBB	Carrollton, Georgia	54515	D	1	0.034		33.571389°N 85.050556°W
WLOL	Minneapolis, Minnesota	42963	B	9.7	5.1		44.783889°N 93.343889°W
WMLT	Dublin, Georgia	62475	D	1	0.012		32.563611°N 82.871667°W
WNIX	Greenville, Mississippi	66328	D	3.8	0.055		33.41°N 91.0175°W
WNTA	Rockford, Illinois	671	D	1	0.091		42.225556°N 89.046944°W
WRAA	Luray, Virginia	12572	D	1	0.026		38.659444°N 78.491111°W
WRAM	Monmouth, Illinois	33712	D	1	0.05		40.949722°N 90.571944°W
WRCA	Watertown, Massachusetts	60695	B	25	17		42.288889°N 71.189167°W
WTRE	Greensburg, Indiana	74124	D	0.5	0.033		39.328056°N 85.501667°W
WTRX	Flint, Michigan	15768	B	5	1		42.973611°N 83.65°W
WWAB	Lakeland, Florida	54837	D	1	0.118		28.044444°N 81.974444°W
WWRV	New York, New York	54874	B	10	3.8		40.845°N 74.02°W
WYPC	Wellston, Ohio	29689	D	0.5	0.05		39.106111°N 82.578889°W
WYRD	Greenville, South Carolina	34389	B	5	5		34.855278°N 82.423889°W

== In Uruguay ==
- CX 40 Radio Fénix in Montevideo
