= WEVD =

New York City radio stations, 1927–2003

Station logo in 1942

WEVD was the call sign held by three New York City commercial radio stations, with related ownership, from 1927 until 2003. This call sign was formed from the initials of recently deceased Socialist Party of America leader Eugene Victor Debs.

== History ==
=== Original station (1927-1981) ===
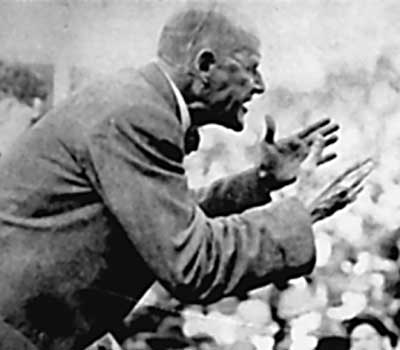
The call letters WEVD were selected in honor of the initials of Socialist Party orator and publicist Eugene Victor Debs.

During the first half of the 1920s, radio broadcasting developed as a new form of influential mass media. The Socialist Party of America saw radio as a potential means of reaching an increasingly apathetic public to aid it financially. At its December 1926 quarterly meeting, the governing National Executive Committee of the Socialist Party decided to erect a radio broadcasting station as a memorial to its recently deceased co-founder, Eugene V. Debs, who had died in October of the previous year. In March 1927, the Socialist Party of America launched a fundraising drive aimed at generating $250,000 for the purchase of a station. Party leader and head of the League for Industrial Democracy Norman Thomas was chosen as chairman of the board of trustees for the new enterprise and venerated party founder Morris Hillquit was appointed as treasurer.

A total of 21 others from the liberal, labor and socialist community were appointed as a board of trustees including such publicly recognized figures as pacifist minister - John Haynes Holmes, Brotherhood of Sleeping Car Porters founder A. Philip Randolph, Amalgamated Clothing Workers leader Sidney Hillman, novelist Upton Sinclair and American Civil Liberties Union head Roger Baldwin. G. August Gerber, son of New York Socialist Party functionary Julius Gerber, was named as secretary of the board and director of the fundraising drive.

At the fundraising drive's launch, Norman Thomas remarked:

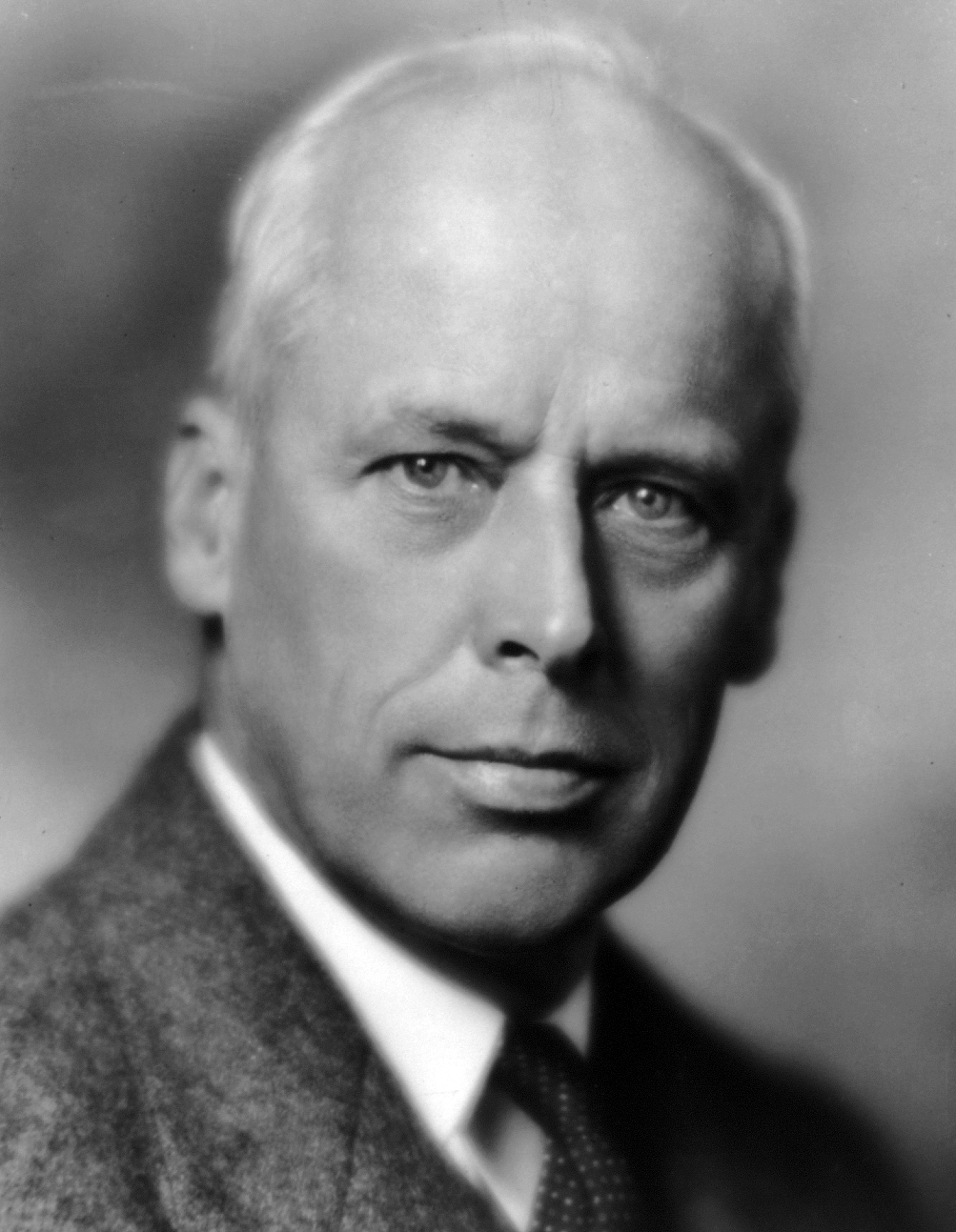
Norman Thomas, who ran 6 times for president heading the Socialist ticket, was chairman of the Board of Trustees of the Debs Memorial Radio Fund.

The usefulness of a well established radio station open to full and frank discussion of great economic and social issues is beyond doubt. Past experience combines with common sense in assuring us that the commercial broadcasting stations cannot be expected to give much time or attention to the great vision for which Gene Debs gave his life. I am glad to observe that you have invited and obtained the acceptance of men and women as trustees who are not members of the Socialist Party. Such ... [shall] guarantee that the Debs Memorial Radio Fund will be free from a narrow and intolerant partisanship.

Thomas and Hillquit envisioned the radio station as a memorial to the late Debs. In a joint statement, they called for a "monument" which was to be "a living instrument of social service... to be operated in the interests of all progressive movements and ideas and in aid of all struggles for social justice in the tolerant and broad-minded spirit of Gene Debs."

The Radio Fund's trustees estimated cost of launching a station at $100,000 and hoped to invest the additional balance of $150,000 to generate sufficient interest income to allow for perpetual operations. The Debs Memorial Radio Fund launched its fundraising campaign with a mailing of 15,000 letters soliciting funds for the establishment of a Socialist Party-owned radio station. However, this first round brought in just over $2,650 – only slightly more than 1% of the goal. While this grand vision of substantial funding proved overly optimistic, the necessary funds for a station acquisition was raised from party members and sympathetic labor unions during the first half of 1927.

==== Launch ====
Around the first of August 1927 the "Debs Memorial Radio Fund" trustees announced the purchase of WSOM, owned by Union Course Laboratories, which transmitted from Woodhaven in the New York City borough of Queens. WSOM had been on the air since 1926; the station had moved into New York City just six months prior.

An immediate application was made to the Federal Radio Commission (FRC) for a change of call letters to WDEBS, as well as for an increase of transmission power from 500 to 1,000 watts, to enable the station to broadcast with less effect from the skyscrapers of New York. The broadcast studio was to be located somewhere in Manhattan, it was reported.

The Socialist Party and its partners received assurances from the FRC that a broadcasting license would be promptly granted. Joining the Socialist Party with the Debs radio project were a number of national and international trade unions, including the United Mine Workers of America, the International Ladies' Garment Workers' Union, the Amalgamated Clothing Workers of America, the Brotherhood of Locomotive Engineers, the Brotherhood of Sleeping Car Porters, and the United Hebrew Trades. Also joining the fundraising effort were the left wing fraternal benefit society the Workmen's Circle and the financially successful Yiddish language social democratic daily, The Jewish Daily Forward, headed by Abraham Cahan.

While the purchase price of the station was not revealed, August Gerber indicated that the bulk of the $250,000 operating fund – which had still not been fully met – was to be used to cover ongoing operating expenses. Gerber expressed a belief that the station would become self-supporting in fairly short order and indicated a desire to make the new New York station the flagship of a network of "labor radio stations" throughout the United States. Gerber declared: "The purchase of a labor station ... will guarantee to minority opinion in America its right to be heard without censorship. With radio now privately owned and controlled, a station like WDEBS is the only cry in the wilderness... We promise that, as soon as we can proceed with full operation, Station WDEBS will be not merely a chronicler of events, nor a vehicle of music and entertainment, though we hope not to fail even in these matters, but a militant, fighting champion of the rights of the oppressed, of all those who toil by hand or brain to produce the wealth of this world."

The desire for the assignment of WDEBS as the station's call letters was vetoed by FRC, which ruled that only aircraft could have five-letter call signs, while ground radio stations were limited to four letters or fewer. Eugene V. Debs' initials were thus substituted, and WEVD was born.

The Debs Memorial Radio Fund began operating WEVD on August 18, 1927. In addition to English-language broadcasts, one of the organizations providing funding, the widely circulated and financially successful Jewish Daily Forward newspaper, launched what would become what one radio historian called "the most famous Yiddish radio program of all time" — The Forward Hour. This show was first broadcast every Sunday morning at 11 o'clock, and gained a significant following among the Yiddish-speaking immigrant community of New York City.

Finances were tight throughout the entire period of the Socialist Party's operation of the station. Operating costs were minimized through the generosity of the ILGWU, which allowed the station free use of the entire 6th floor of its headquarters building in New York City. A network of studios and reception rooms were created in the space, providing a fully adequate base of operations for the station.

Operating funds came from small-scale listener contributions, regular donations from the American Civil Liberties Union and other organizations interested in the station's mission, and the left wing philanthropic trust, the American Fund for Public Service, commonly known as the Garland Fund. Station manager Gerber dedicated much of his time to keeping the station's meager revenue stream flowing, although by January 1928 Norman Thomas was opining that the Socialist Party and its radio station "can't go on living like this."

==== Regulatory difficulties ====
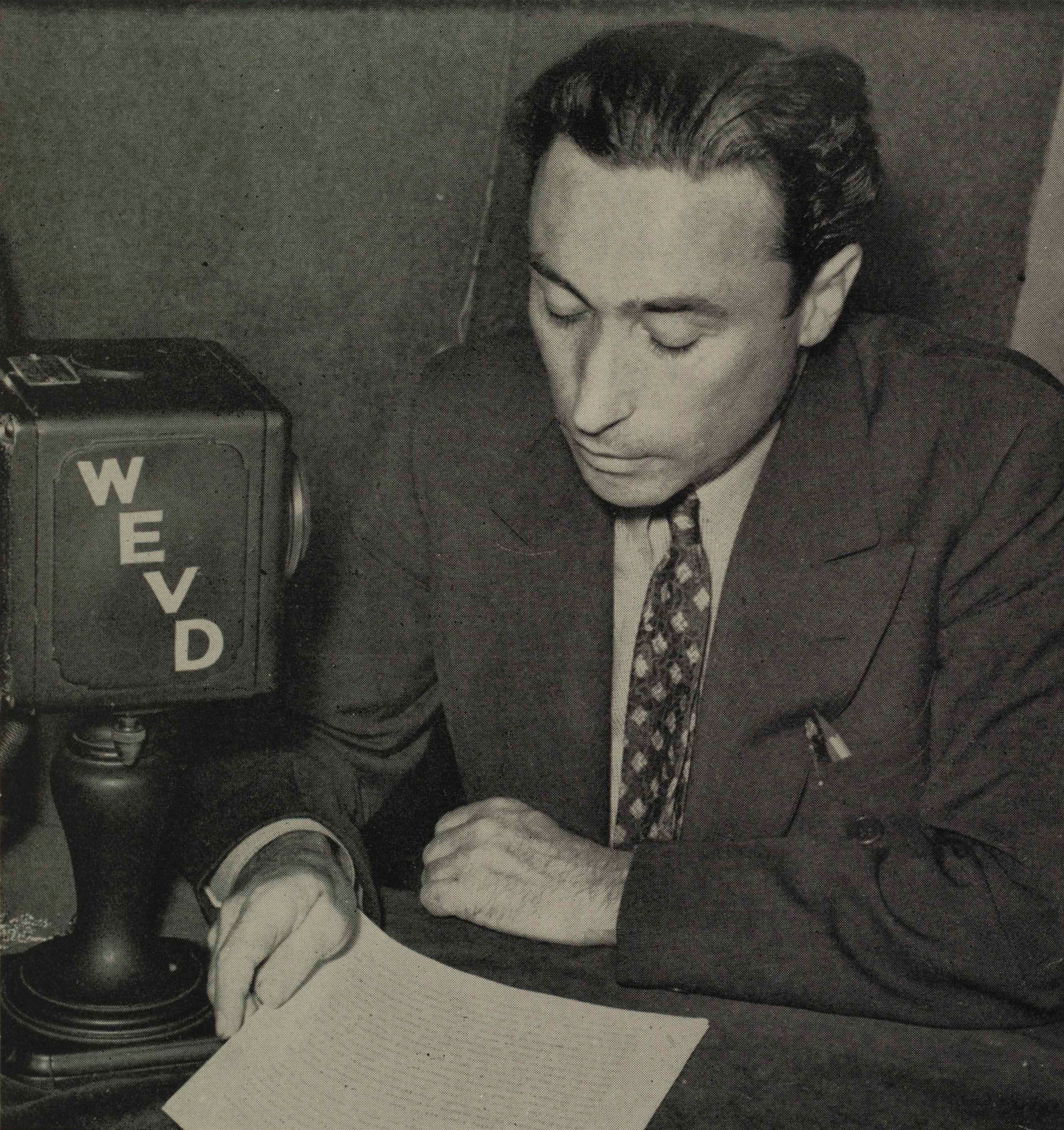
ILGWU Vice President Charles S. Zimmerman speaking on WEVD c. 1937

On top of the Socialist Party's financial troubles came regulatory problems with the FRC. Stations were initially issued a series of temporary authorizations starting on May 3, 1927. In addition, they were informed that if they wanted to continue operating, they needed to file a formal license application by January 15, 1928, as the first step in determining whether they met the new "public interest, convenience, or necessity" standard. On May 25, 1928, the FRC issued General Order 32, which notified 164 stations, including WEVD, that "From an examination of your application for future license it does not find that public interest, convenience, or necessity would be served by granting it." Critics saw this as part of a plan to rationalize the distribution of radio assignments by forcing out small stations catering to niche audiences in favor of fewer high powered stations broadcasting commercially to a mass market.

Representatives of WEVD and 109 other threatened stations made their way to Washington, D.C. in July 1928 for two weeks of regulatory hearings on the issue. Station manager Gerber responded with a statement emphasizing the importance of defending free speech and the right of political minorities to submit their ideas to a broad public. Party leader Norman Thomas echoed this perspective, declaring the value of WEVD and other community stations as a bulwark against a "big chain system" which tended to "standardize — to make robots and Babbitts of the American people."

The efforts of Gerber and Thomas ultimately proved successful, with the FRC approving the WEVD renewal application one month later. In the FRC's judgment WEVD had followed a "very satisfactory policy" of representing a range of political and economic perspectives befitting "the mouthpiece of a substantial political or religious minority." An editor at the New York Times concurred with the radio regulators' assessment, noting that revoking WEVD's license on the basis of its political views "would be both unjust and stupid."

WEVD won praise for its news reporting and commentary, taking an array of issues relating to world affairs, American foreign policy, and activities of the American labor movement. In an era in which few stations did likewise, WEVD produced programming dealing with African-American history and culture, including the broadcast of a weekly Pullman Porters Hour sponsored by the Brotherhood of Sleeping Car Porters, which included both entertainment and talks on serious topics of interest to the black community of New York City.

WEVD's Educational Director, Paul Blanshard, expanded the station's educational content following its August 1928 license renewal, including weekly courses on economics conducted by A.J. Muste of Brookwood Labor College. Sunday afternoons the station broadcast a regular speakers' forum which included such prominent liberal voices as journalist Walter Lippman, Rabbi Stephen S. Wise, and Oswald Garrison Villard, publisher of The Nation magazine.

==== Frequency change and more trouble ====
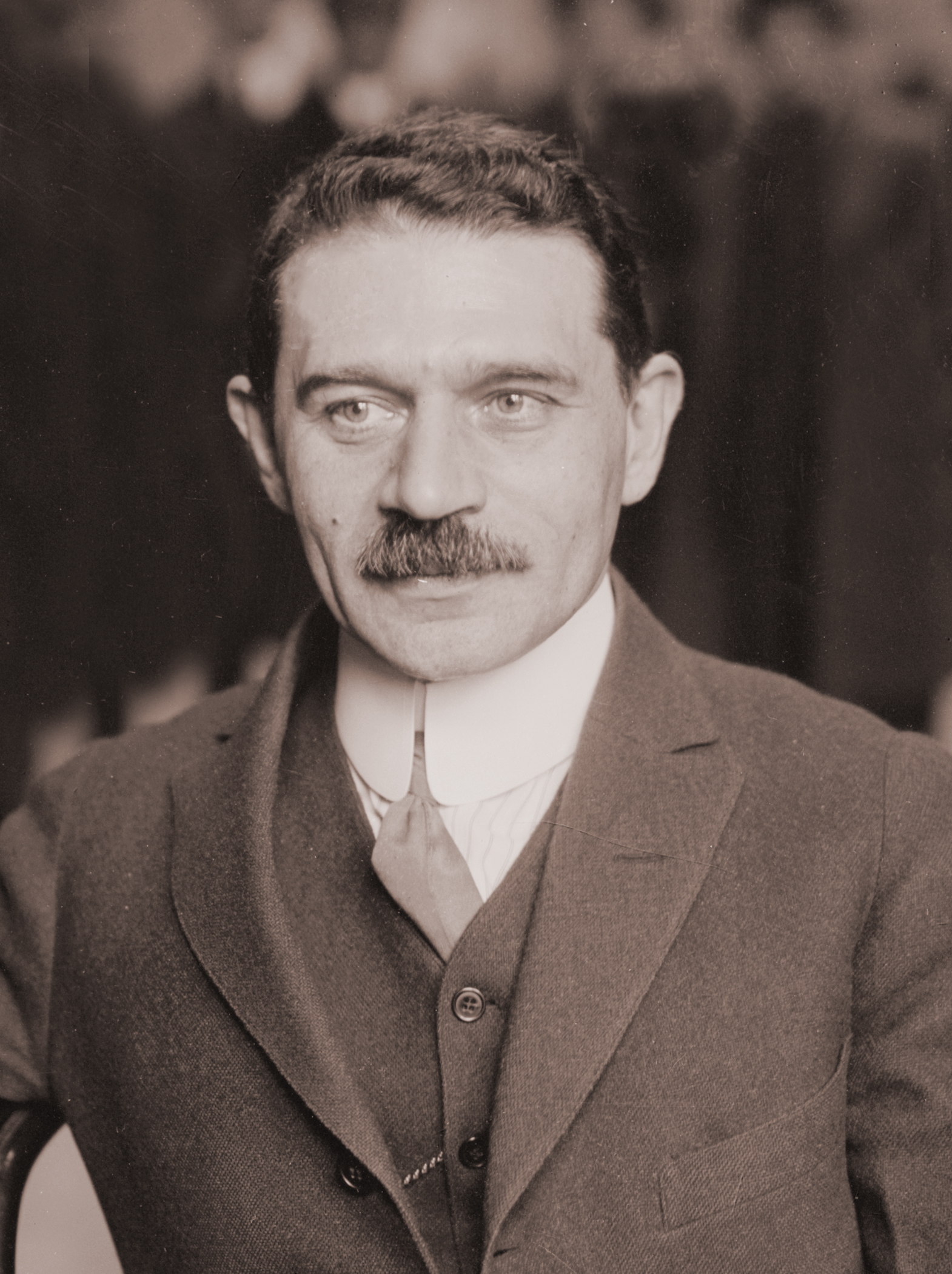
Socialist Party leader Morris Hillquit, an attorney, was instrumental in the 1928 and 1931 regulatory defenses of WEVD.

Late in 1928, by General Order 40, WEVD was moved to a new frequency by the Federal Radio Commission, 1300 kilocycles, and was able to boost its power somewhat. While the move had been sought by the Debs Memorial Radio Fund, which remained the legal entity owning the station, the change ultimately solved little – WEVD remained underpowered and forced to share its frequency with three other stations. The station broadcast 50 hours per week, ranging from as little as two hours on Fridays to 18 hours on Wednesdays.

WEVD's limited power and hours of operation created a difficult financial position, as unions and other left-wing institutions were difficult to motivate to make donations due to the station's limited broadcast time and poor signal coverage, but without these donations it would be impossible to improve the visibility that would encourage donations. To make up the financial shortfall the station became aggressive in pushing for contributions from its listeners.

The FRC continued to seek a reduction in the number of stations to more closely match the limited number of broadcast frequencies and saw weak and underfinanced stations such as WEVD as candidates for elimination. A number of complaints about the station began to be accumulated. In October 1930 a new set of hearings began with respect to the license renewal of the socialist radio station. A range of violations of the Radio Act of 1927 were cited, including repeated failure to announce station call letters on the air every 15 minutes and inability to stay on its assigned wavelength. A recommendation was made by the FRC examiner assigned to the case to deny the station's license renewal application.

Once again Norman Thomas, August Gerber, and Morris Hillquit jumped to action, painting the station's woes as part of a political vendetta aimed at homogenization of the radio airwaves at the expense of political minorities. The American Civil Liberties Union promised its aid in making the WEVD renewal controversy a national free speech campaign. The final report of the FRC examiner was filed on December 11, 1930, and the station was notified of the decision a week later. Within two weeks the station had submitted a 17-page challenge of the FRC examiner's ruling, which combined with public pressure from listeners compelled the FRC to temporarily reverse its decision on January 13, 1931.

Additional regulatory hearings about WEVD were held in March and May 1931, with regulators charging that the Debs Memorial Radio Fund lacked sufficient financial resources to meet minimum standards established by the FRC. The uniqueness of WEVD's broadcast content was also denied. Regulators thus sought to award the WEVD frequency to station WFOX, owned by Paramount Pictures, arguing that station's "superior fitness to serve the public convenience, necessity and welfare."

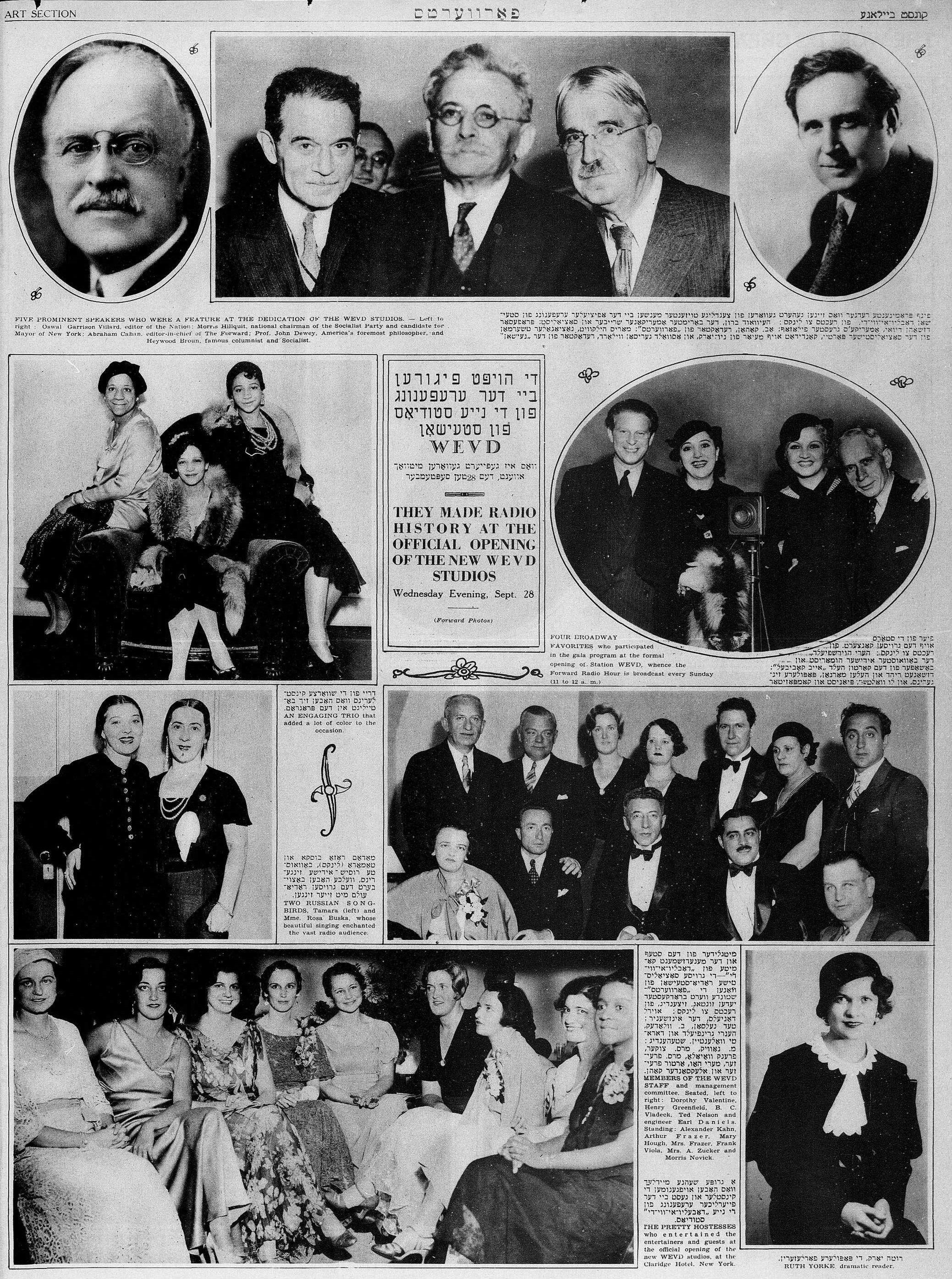
Page from the Jewish Daily Forward's art section celebrating the opening of WEVD's new studio, October 9, 1932

In response to the FRC's hostile action, efforts were made to address the situation at WEVD through a fundamental reorganization of the operation. Problems to be addressed included inadequate equipment, poor broadcast location, insufficient funding, and a haphazard planning of station content. Party leader Morris Hillquit was particularly instrumental in the reorganization, coming up with the idea of selling $50,000 in WEVD stock to pay off standing obligations and invest in new capacity and content.

The need to raise funds to improve and expand operations during the second half of 1931 was answered by Abe Cahan, editor and publisher of the social democratic Jewish Daily Forward, the largest Yiddish-language newspaper in the world. Cahan was firmly committed to the importance of the project and he made the newspapers funds freely available, depositing $70,000 on account in the fall of 1931 for the expansion of the station assuming the renewal of its broadcast license. Together with previous and subsequent cash infusions, the Forward had invested $200,000 in WEVD by the end of that year.

In a split decision the FRC renewed the license for WEVD at the end of October 1931. Preparations immediately began for the transfer of the station's operations from the 6th floor of the ILGWU building in Manhattan to a new home located on Long Island, and the station's management was shuffled. The grand opening of the new studio took place on September 28, 1932, and was marked by an array of liberal and socialist worthies who spoke at the occasion, including Hillquit, Cahan, educator John Dewey, magazine publisher Oswald Garrison Villard, and writer Heywood Broun.

==== Transfer to The Forward ====
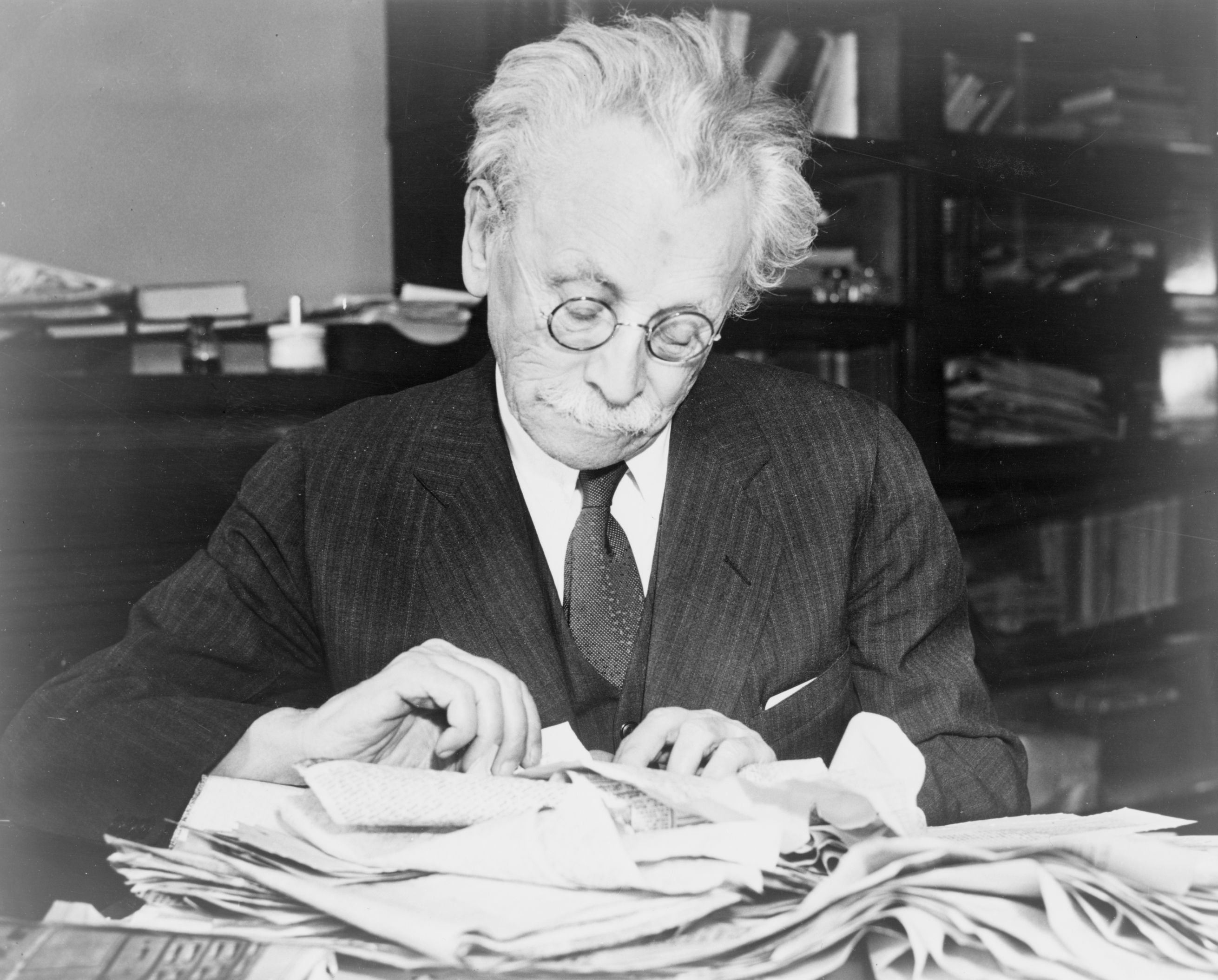
Abraham Cahan (1860–1951) of the Jewish Daily Forward in his later years.

In 1938, WEVD bought one of its time-sharing partners on AM 1300, WHAP/WFAB; an FCC examiner recommended the Debs Memorial Fund be allowed to buy the WFAB assets for $85,000 from the Fifth Avenue Broadcasting Corporation, expanding its weekly broadcast hours from 50 to 86. However, two other stations shared the broadcast frequency with WEVD: WHAZ, the radio station of Rensselaer Polytechnic Institute in Troy, New York, which was on-air only on Monday evenings, and WBBR, also of New York City, owned by the Watchtower Bible and Tract Society, publishing arm of the religious group Jehovah's Witnesses. From the time of the 1932 broadcasting agreement through the 1970s the Socialist and Yiddish-language WEVD continued to share its station frequency with the religious group, transmitting 86 hours per week while leaving Sundays and early mornings until 8 o'clock to WBBR (sold and changed to WPOW in 1957), and Monday nights to WHAZ. WHAZ was sold to the owners of WPOW in 1967 and turned into a non-interfering, daytime-only station, with WPOW taking the old WHAZ Monday night hours. All of these stations moved from 1300 to 1330 kHz with the coming into force of the North American Regional Broadcasting Agreement on March 29, 1941.

The newspaper's extensive financial support gave it a primary role in the functioning of the "Debs radio". The Jewish Daily Forward's investment in the station soon swelled to nearly $250,000 and its influence over programming increased commensurately. Throughout the 1930s the station's editorial line moved steadily away from explicitly socialist politics to a more centrist orientation, paralleling the political perspective of The Forward itself. The Forward also underwrote the 1938 purchase of WFAB.

Free access to the airwaves by trade unions was increasingly restricted and left wing political broadcasting sometimes faced preemption in favor of sponsored commercial content. The station ultimately emerged as the radio arm of The Forward, while the Socialist Party turned to the airwaves of the National Broadcasting Company and other channels in its efforts to make its political message heard on a mass basis.

WEVD did not become completely apolitical in this period, however, as during the 1930s a weekly talk show was launched hosted by Chester M. Wright of the International Labor News Service. This show paid its way through a commercial sponsorship by Avalon Cigarettes and was syndicated to a national audience through electrical transcription.

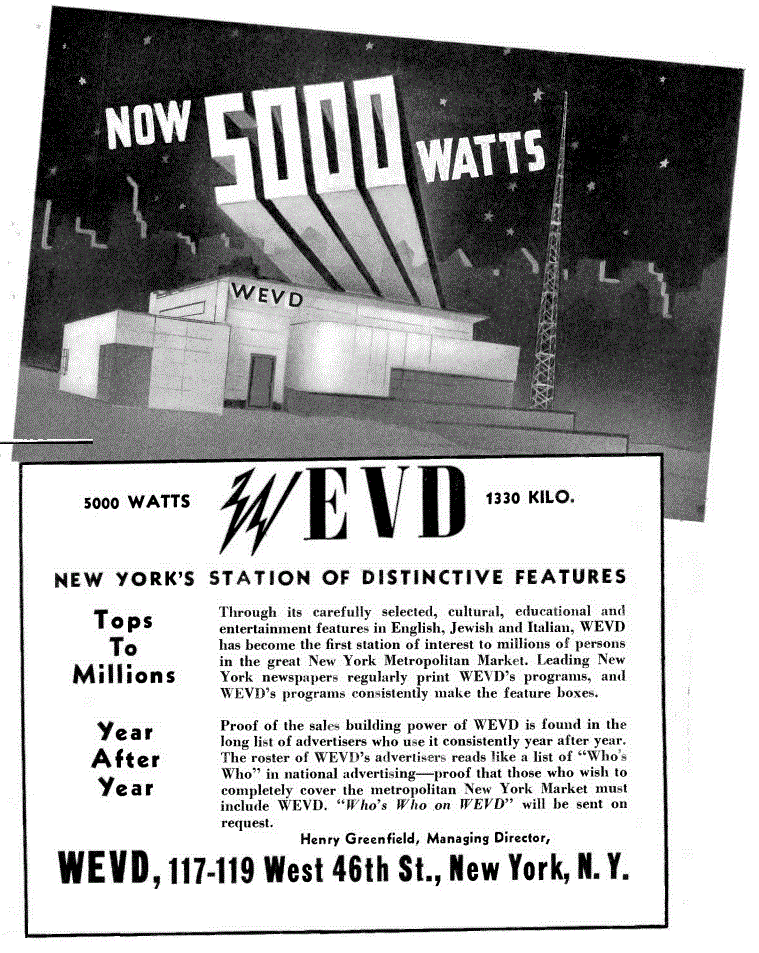
1942 station advertisement.

On January 9, 1950, Harold Cammer, Burton Zorn, Edwin M. Ottenbourg, Samuel Harris Cohen spoke with Stanley G. House as moderator on "Should New York State Have a Little Taft-Hartley Law?"

On February 6, 1953, New York University philosophy professor Sidney Hook discussed "The Threat to Academic Freedom" with Victor Riesel and others in the evening on WEVD radio.

In 1975, WEVD was approved to begin using the transmitting facilities of its shared-time partner, WPOW, on Rossville, Staten Island.

By 1978, the Forward was analyzing the sale of the unprofitable AM outlet. In 1981, the Forward Association sold WEVD (AM) to Salem Media, which changed the station's format and on March 2, 1981, its call letters, making it the Christian station WNYM. Salem subsequently purchased WPOW, merging that station into WNYM and eliminating the 52-year time-share on 1330 as of December 31, 1984. WNYM evolved into WWRV, broadcasting around the clock on 1330 AM.

=== WEVD-FM (1951-1989) ===
In 1951, FM sister station WEVD-FM was added to the airwaves, first broadcasting on 107.5 Mhz, then moving to 97.9 a year later, where it remained for the next 36 years. Because it did not share its frequency, WEVD-FM could operate for unlimited hours. However, very few people had FM receivers at this time. After the sale of the original WEVD on AM 1330, WEVD-FM remained on the air under The Forward's ownership, until its 1989 sale to Spanish Broadcasting System.

=== AM 1050 (1989-2003) ===
In 1988, Emmis Broadcasting acquired the license of WNBC and moved the WFAN call letters and sports format from 1050 to 660 AM. Emmis sold the license for AM 1050 to Spanish Broadcasting System (SBS), which quickly agreed to trade that license with cash to the Forward Association for WEVD-FM. Until the latter transaction was approved, SBS operated 1050 as a Spanish-language station called WUKQ. When the deal was finally consummated, WEVD moved its call letters and programming to 1050 and the former WEVD-FM became WSKQ-FM.

The station carried brokered programming with some news-talk. WEVD gradually replaced much of its brokered ethnic programming with liberal talk shows over the next several years; it gained some loyal listeners, but not enough to keep the station economically viable. In 2001, the Forward Association entered into a local marketing agreement with ESPN Radio, and WEVD began broadcasting that network's programming on September 2 of that year. In 2003, the station was sold outright to ESPN and its call letters changed to WEPN, ending the 76-year history of WEVD call letters in New York City.

== See also ==
- WCFL, radio station in Chicago operated by the Chicago Federation of Labor.
