= WHAZ =

WHAZ may refer to:

- WHAZ (AM), a radio station (1330 AM) licensed to Troy, New York, United States
- WHAZ-FM, a radio station (97.5 FM) licensed to Hoosick Falls, New York, United States
