= WEPN (AM) =

ESPN Radio station in New York City

- New York, New York; United States
- Broadcast area: New York metropolitan area
- Frequency: 1050 kHz
- Branding: 1050 AM ESPN

Programming
- Language: English
- Format: Sports radio
- Network: ESPN Radio; New York Islanders; Buffalo Bills Radio Network

Ownership
- Owner: Good Karma Sports; (Good Karma Broadcasting, L.L.C.)
- Sister stations: WHSQ

History
- First air date: March 19, 1922
- Former call signs: WHN (1922–1948); WMGM (1948–1962); WHN (1962–1987); WFAN (1987–1988); WUKQ (1988–1989); WEVD (1989–2003)
- Call sign meaning: ESPN Radio

Technical information
- Licensing authority: FCC
- Facility ID: 65636
- Class: B
- Power: 50,000 watts
- Transmitter coordinates: 40°46′36.37″N 74°3′6.51″W

Links
- Public license information: Public file; LMS
- Webcast: Listen live
- Website: goodkarmabrands.com/espn-new-york/

WEPN (1050 kHz) is a sports radio station licensed to New York, New York. The station is owned-and-operated by Good Karma Sports and its transmitter site is located in North Bergen, New Jersey.

The 1050 AM facility in New York signed on in 1922 as WHN. For the majority of its existence under these call letters, as well as during its 14-year stint as WMGM, the station broadcast several different music-based formats, finally assuming a country music format in 1973. In 1987, WHN dropped its country format to become the first radio station dedicated entirely to sports programming, changing its call letters to WFAN. A series of transactions in the late 1980s resulted in WFAN's format and call letters moving in October 1988 to 660 AM (on which WFAN has continued to broadcast since), with the brokered programming format and call letters of The Forward-owned WEVD (previously on 97.9 FM) being moved to 1050 AM in February 1989. In 2001, The Walt Disney Company took control of the station (later buying it and renaming it to WEPN in 2003) and transformed it into a full-time affiliate of its ESPN Radio network. In 2012, WEPN became an affiliate of the Spanish-language ESPN Deportes Radio network, reverting to broadcasting the English-language ESPN Radio upon ESPN Deportes Radio's shutdown in 2019.

Since its return to ESPN Radio programming in 2019, the station has aired the national ESPN Radio lineup in its entirety, including programs not cleared by WHSQ (880 AM) or, prior to August 2024, WEPN-FM (98.7). WEPN also carries Buffalo Bills games, and overflow play-by-play rights, including most New York Islanders games, and some New York Rangers games.

== History ==
The 1050 frequency has a long history prior to this format. Starting in the 1920s as WHN, its programming was a standard mix of music, news, weather and drama. It was renamed WMGM in the late 1940s, continuing the same format until a switch to rock & roll in the late 1950s and early 1960s. As WHN again, it played adult standards in the 1960s and country music in the 1970s and 1980s (the format it was best known for). In the late 1980s as WFAN, it was the original frequency for the very successful first of its kind all-sports station. Then began a truly convoluted set of ownership, call sign, and format changes from the Spanish language WUKQ to WEVD, a brokered station in the 1990s, to today's incarnation as WEPN.

=== WHN (1922–1948) ===
Originally owned by the Ridgewood Times newspaper, WHN was one of the first radio stations in New York City, going on the air on March 18, 1922, at AM frequency 833 kilocycles. The station's schedule was not originally published in its owner's radio page. The first mention of the station in the press may have been in the Brooklyn Eagle of April 9, 1922, with the following schedule: 9-11 a.m., Hour For Women; 12:15 p.m., Lunch Hour Gossip; 3:15, Afternoon Tea Discussion; 4:15, Radio Gossip For Amateurs, Boy Scout News. The "Radio Gossip" appears to have been instructions on how to build or operate a radio set by E.H. Lewis of the New York YMCA Radio School. Before the end of April, WHN had added a two-hour Sunday afternoon program of religious music and a brief sermon, and augmented its Monday through Saturday programming with a talk on real estate at 6:15 p.m., and a children's bedtime story by James Baldwin at 7:15, followed by jazz or another talk.

The station was sharing 360 meters with WJZ, WWZ and WOR.

In March 1924, the station was sued in a test case by AT&T, for failure to pay for its use of AT&T's radio patents. Although AT&T denied rising public opinion that it was attempting to monopolize commercial broadcasting, it began to fear an antitrust investigation. In addition, WHN's defense was seen as weak, so the two parties agreed to settle out-of-court, which was reported as:

According to the stipulations of the settlement, the American Telephone and Telegraph Company released WHN from all liability for past infringement of its patents. WHN paid $2,000 for a personal, non-transferable license to do general telephonic broadcasting, including for toll or hire, for the entire term of the patents. If at any time the power of WHN should be increased, the American Telephone and Telegraph Company will grant a new license on similar terms and for a proportionally larger fee.

This settlement established a standard rate for a commercial license to use AT&T's radio patents, based on a station's transmitter power, set at $4 per kilowatt, although non-commercial stations were only charged $1.

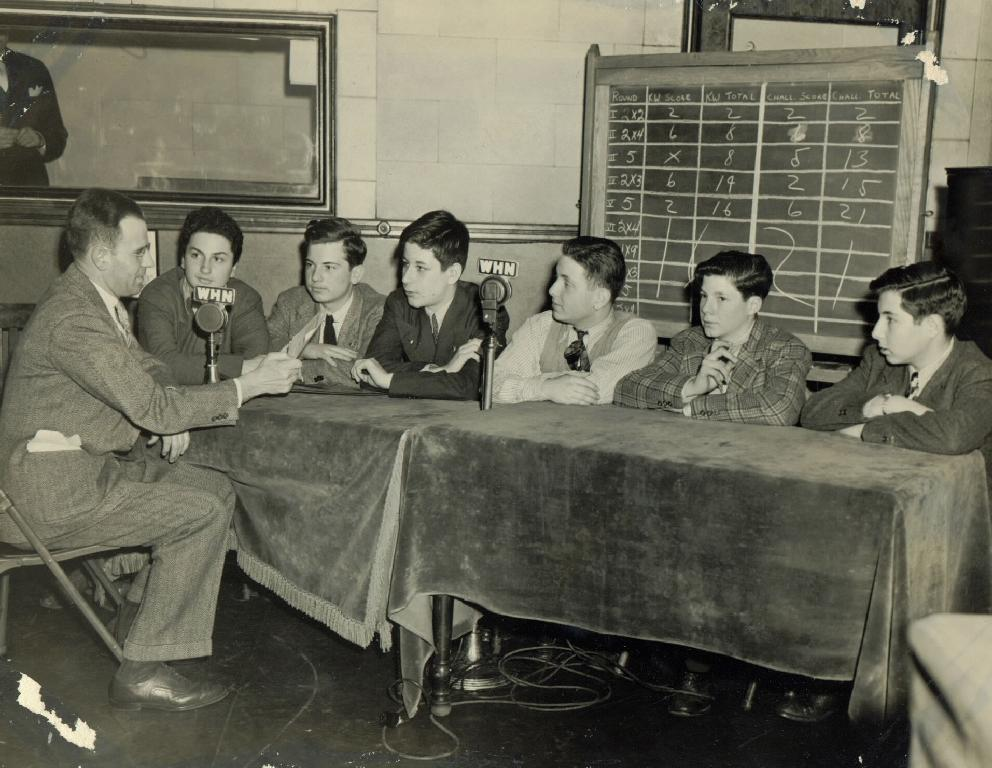
1938 WHN radio show, Whiz Kids.

The station played jazz and contemporary dance music, including Sophie Tucker, Fletcher Henderson, and Duke Ellington, as well as broadcasting Columbia University football games. In 1928, the station was bought by the Loew's Theatre Organization. During the 1920s, the station's frequency changed to 830, 760, and then 1010. In the 1930s, it broadcast the Major Bowes Amateur Hour, which was picked up by the CBS Radio Network.

In 1933, WHN became a full-time station when it acquired the licenses of WRNY and WQAO-WPAP with approval by the Federal Radio Commission on January 31 and February 3, respectively.

In 1938, WHN hosted a show called Whiz Kids.

WHN made its final frequency change to 1050 in 1941. During the 1940s, the programs Radio Newsreel and Newsreel Theater were prototypes for what later became the all-news radio format. The station broadcast Brooklyn Dodgers games with Red Barber as well as the New York Giants and New York Rangers with Marty Glickman.

In 1946, the station hired Eddie Cantor's daughter Marilyn as one of the earliest female disc jockeys. She hosted a program for children.

=== WMGM (1948–1962) ===
On September 15, 1948, the station changed its call letters to WMGM, reflecting Loew's then-ownership of movie studio Metro-Goldwyn-Mayer. The station had a diversified format that included pop standard hits, drama, talk, and sports, and briefly featured New York talk host Barry Gray.

In May 1956, the station switched to playing Top 40 rock and roll hits, which covered a broad spectrum of music. The '50s brand of Top 40 played by WMGM and its competitors included what might today be considered rhythm and blues and country music, in addition to popular instrumentals (Percy Faith's 1960 "Theme from A Summer Place" and Acker Bilk's 1962 "Stranger on the Shore" hit the top of the charts during this era). WMGM was overall more up-tempo than the competition, featuring artists like Elvis Presley, Fats Domino, Carl Perkins, Jerry Lee Lewis, Frankie Lymon, the Crystals, the Tokens, Ray Charles, Dinah Washington, Brook Benton, Ricky Nelson, and Bill Haley. Its playlists were narrower and more predictable than those of mainstream MOR stations. WMGM's disc jockey lineup included morning man Ted Brown and the Redhead, Ted's then-wife Rhoda, Jerry Marshall, Peter Tripp, Norm Stevens, Dick Shepherd, Bob Lewis, Ed Stokes and Bob Callen. Among its newsreaders were Bill Edmunds, Dick DeFrietas and Aime Govin. During its Top 40 incarnation, WMGM was for a time home to New York Yankees baseball with Mel Allen, Red Barber and Phil Rizzuto. Ex-athletes Marty Glickman and Gussie Moran worked Yankees pre- and post-game shows from the studio.

WMGM had a theme song incorporating the names of many of its DJs in the 1960s. The words were:

He was a US Marshal and Jerry was his name.
So they called him Jerry Marshall and widespread was his fame.
He went to catch the outlaws, Bob Callen and Ted Brown
Who were roping old Dick Shephard's sheep and herding them to town.
Sing a song about Western hero men will never ride the range again.
They're on 1050 WMGM.

By 1962, with WINS, WABC, and WMCA also playing predominantly rock and roll music, WMGM was sold by Loew's to Storer Communications, which owned mostly TV stations, but also owned WIBG, a rock and roll radio station less than 100 miles (160 km) away in Philadelphia.

=== WHN again (1962–1987) ===
Storer immediately dropped Top 40 for slow-paced standards and beautiful music, the province of much of FM radio at the time. The station was renamed WHN again on February 28, 1962, with special permission of the Federal Communications Commission (FCC). Three-letter call sign sets are a rarity and have not been issued to broadcast stations since the early 1930s.

Through the 1960s, WHN became New York City's Mutual Broadcasting System affiliate. On-air hosts included Jim Ameche, and early on, the comedy team of Bob Elliot and Ray Goulding (Bob and Ray). (Morning host Ted Brown remained with WHN for only a short time of transition, heading eventually to MOR WNEW. The station played vocalists such as Nat King Cole, Perry Como, Frank Sinatra, Bing Crosby, Peggy Lee, Patti Page, and Johnny Mathis, plus a heavy dose of instrumentalist groups, notably Percy Faith, Al Hirt, Ray Conniff, and Henry Mancini. The station was about 75% vocal and 25% instrumental. Ratings were respectable, but the demographic was older by a generation or two.

In 1968, WHN gradually began mixing in softer songs by artists like Elvis Presley, The Everly Brothers, The Beatles, The Association, and others with their easy listening format. Still, the ratings were below average. By 1970, the station had evolved into more of a MOR format and less of an easy listening format and by 1972 evolved into more of an adult contemporary format similar to what WNEW was then doing.

WHN picked up New York Mets baseball for 1964 (with announcers Lindsey Nelson, Bob Murphy, and Ralph Kiner), after the team's original NYC flagship, WABC 770, dropped the rights, broadcasting through the 1966 season, with the Mets later returning to their airwaves from 1972 through 1974. The station also became a launching pad for the radio sports broadcasting career of Marv Albert, who hosted the "Interwoven Scoreboard" after Mets games and later on reintroduced New York fans to the Knicks and Rangers on radio. Initially, Rangers games were broadcast in small doses: the last two minutes of the first and second periods, then the entire third period. The entire metropolitan area enjoyed Red Holzman's miracle 1969–70 Knicks championship run, much of which was blacked out on TV.

Overall though, WHN's ratings were still low. After a lot of research, on February 26, 1973, WHN became a country music station. The New York Metropolitan Area had never been a country music hot spot, and prior to WHN, the area had only had two country music stations: WJRZ in Hackensack, New Jersey, and WTHE in Mineola, New York. In the early years of WHN's country format, it featured on-air personalities such as Larry Kenney, Big Wilson and Jack Spector. Some of these were holdovers from the previous middle of the road format.

As a country music station, they played artists like Johnny Cash, Willie Nelson, Waylon Jennings, Tanya Tucker, Lynn Anderson, Kenny Rogers, Mel Tillis, Charley Pride, Mickey Gilley, Ronnie Milsap, and many more. Also, they mixed in non-country and country-pop cross-over artists that had country-friendly songs such as The Eagles, Elvis Presley, Anne Murray, Olivia Newton-John, Linda Ronstadt, and others. Over the years, as WHN evolved as a country station, on-air personalities such as Dan Daniel, Alan Colmes, Jerry Carroll and others moved in.

During this era, WHN was programmed by Ed Salamon, who was inducted into the Country Radio Hall of Fame in 2006. Salamon and promotional partner Dale Pon were able to walk the line between country music like Johnny Cash, Dolly Parton, and latter day Elvis, Top 40 radio programming tactics, and the late 70s rock artists –including The Eagles, Ronstadt, Newton-John, and Rogers– who had absorbed country into their contemporary pop– and, using extensive, award-winning television and transit advertising, into one of the most successful Country radio stations in history.

In the late 1970s, Mutual Radio bought WHN from Storer. In 1980, WHN got some competition when WRVR was sold to Viacom and dropped jazz for country and became WKHK (also known as "Kick 106 FM"). As a result, ratings went down for WHN, although they again added New York Mets baseball to their lineup in 1983 (WHN had previously carried the Mets from 1964 through 1968, and again in 1972 through 1974).

In 1984, WKHK became "Lite FM" WLTW, playing a soft adult contemporary format. Without direct competition, WHN remained country, with decent ratings. In 1985 Doubleday Broadcasting Co., a subsidiary of publisher Doubleday and Company, acquired WHN, and sold the station to Emmis Communications in 1986. Emmis added sports talk in the evenings, but kept the country format the rest of the day until 1987. In late April 1987, Emmis announced that WHN would drop country on July 1 for an all-sports format, the first of its kind on radio. They would drop the WHN calls and become WFAN (The Fan). In May, NBC announced that adult contemporary WYNY (today's WQHT) would go country on July 1. Dan Taylor signed off WHN's 25-year history at 3 p.m. that day with "For The Good Times" by Ray Price.

=== WFAN (1987–1988) ===
The first voice heard on WFAN was that of Suzyn Waldman with a sports update at 3:00 pm, followed by the first show, which was hosted by Jim Lampley. Waldman would report for the station, covering the Yankees and Knicks, for 14 years. Other personalities that hosted shows besides Lampley in the 1050 kHz years included Bill Mazer, Pete Franklin, Greg Gumbel and Ed Coleman. WFAN also inherited WHN's broadcast rights to the Mets. The station's ratings were low at first, but began to grow.

In early 1988, General Electric, which now owned NBC through its purchase of RCA two years earlier, announced that it would sell off the NBC Radio division. In February of that year, GE made a multi-station deal with Emmis; in New York, the WNBC and WYNY licenses were included in the sale. This ended up giving Emmis control of four frequencies: 97.1 FM, 103.5 FM, 660 AM and 1050 AM, whereas duopolies were not permitted yet by the FCC.

On September 22, 1988, Emmis ended up moving their Dance/R&B "Hot" format and call letters WQHT over to the 97.1 frequency (while selling the 103.5 facility and WYNY's intellectual property over to Westwood One; that station would later become WKTU in 1996), and then moved WFAN's intellectual property from 1050 to 660 on October 7, at 5:30 pm, replacing "66 WNBC", which signed off forever. The move placed WFAN on a clear-channel frequency covering most of the eastern half of the continent at night.

=== WUKQ (1988–1989) ===
As for the 1050 license, the Spanish Broadcasting System bought it, intending to swap it with cash to The Jewish Daily Forward for their FM station, WEVD (97.9 FM). However, Spanish Broadcasting already owned WSKQ (620 AM) in Newark, New Jersey. The deal for WEVD could not be consummated at the same time as Emmis' purchase of 660, which left Spanish Broadcasting owning two AM stations in the New York market, which (as was the case with Emmis earlier) was not permitted under FCC rules at that time.

The FCC granted them a temporary waiver to run 1050 on a noncommercial basis until it could be transferred. Therefore, following WFAN's move to 660, 620 WSKQ flipped from Spanish adult contemporary to Spanish oldies while the 1050 facility became "KQ 1050" WUKQ, playing Spanish adult contemporary music (commercial-free, to satisfy the FCC requirement).

For the first few hours after the switch of WFAN to the 660 facility, WUKQ broadcast a recorded message which was continuously looped stating:

"This is WUKQ-AM New York, operating at 1050 Kilohertz. If you're looking for SportsRadio 1050, we've moved... down the dial to 66 AM. Join us now for the new SportsRadio 66 WFAN."

=== WEVD (1989–2003) ===
The FCC approved the trade of WUKQ for WEVD on February 1, 1989. Under the deal, the Spanish AC format on 620 would move to 97.9 FM, and the station would become WSKQ-FM. Meanwhile, WEVD's call letters and programming moved to the 1050 facility. Dating back to October 20, 1927, WEVD had been the radio station owned by the Workman's Circle (Arbeter Ring) in New York City. Its call letters were a tribute to legendary Socialist Party leader Eugene Victor Debs, who died one year earlier.

This was WEVD's second existence on the AM dial, as it was originally a time-share at 1330 AM with WPOW, an arrangement that lasted until 1984. WEVD soon added an FM counterpart at 107.5 FM in 1950, which then moved to 97.9 FM in 1952. Both stations maintained the same programming through the 1950s, 1960s, and 1970s. The AM station was sold on March 2, 1981, for $1.1 million to Salem Communications, and changed the call letters to WNYM (now WWRV) while WEVD continued on the FM dial.

By 1988, the station was mostly an outlet for leased access foreign language programming. WEVD had a brokered format with Jewish programming (in Yiddish and English), ethnic programs, talk shows, and a big band show with Danny Stiles. The station generated cash flow by selling blocks of airtime, which allowed it to be profitable despite minimal ratings.

By the mid-1990s, WEVD was branded as "News-Talk 1050 WEVD", and had a talk format with a liberal emphasis on weekdays, with ethnic programming at night and on weekends. Talk hosts included Bill Mazer, former New York mayor Ed Koch, Jay Diamond, and Alan Colmes.

During most of 1050's existence as WEVD, the station broadcast Mets, Jets, Knicks and Rangers games produced by WFAN, when WFAN was already broadcasting another game. WFAN game overruns are now broadcast on WBBR.

In 2001, WEVD entered into a local marketing agreement with ABC/Disney and added ESPN Radio's The Dan Patrick Show to the talk lineup. Despite a public campaign to save the old format, the LMA was signed into effect. During its final day on-air as "News-Talk 1050 WEVD", the outraged public campaign was subtly extended into the station's control room, as soon-to-be terminated staffers occasionally interrupted portions of the brokered programming with audio clips, some of which contained obscenities. On September 1, 2001, Alan Colmes was the last voice heard on WEVD closing out the station by giving out his web address, playing Steam's "Na Na Hey Hey Kiss Him Goodbye", and said the last words similar to the last words he said on 66 WNBC in 1988 saying, "We thank you very much, thank you for listening and for the very last time, This is News-Talk 1050 WEVD New York".

On September 2, 2001, at midnight, WEVD began running ESPN Radio full-time, albeit having simulcast WABC's coverage of the September 11 attacks 9 days later. The first local voice on "1050 ESPN Radio" was Don La Greca.

=== WEPN (2003–present) ===
The call-sign was changed to WEPN on April 28, 2003, after being sold to ABC/Disney outright for $78 million. They continued to run the station as "1050 ESPN Radio". For years, WEPN billed itself as New York City's only all-sports station, since competitor WFAN's former morning show, Imus in the Morning, was primarily a politically based talk show. However, this is now a misnomer, since Don Imus has been replaced by a sports-themed show, Boomer and Carton in the Morning.

Despite the fact that it is a 50,000-watt station, it cannot be heard clearly in many parts of the New York metropolitan area, especially west of New York City and in Suffolk County on Long Island. WEPN has a highly directional signal, due primarily to the fact that there is another 50,000-watt station on 1050, CHUM, a few hundred miles to the northwest in Toronto, and yet another 50,000-watt station, KYW, in Philadelphia on the adjacent frequency 1060 AM, along with protecting the signal of Monterrey-based XEG in Northern Mexico to the southwest.

According to Arbitron data of as early 2006, WFAN's daytime ratings were about 3 points higher on average than WEPN's, though WFAN's most-known and now-defunct Mike and the Mad Dog show had been airing since 1989, or well over a decade longer than WEPN had existed. Because of WEPN's limited signal, all Jets games once were simulcast on WABC, which reaches more of the suburbs. The station had also worked with MSG Network to find affiliates for Knicks and Rangers games outside WEPN's coverage area. Early in 2008, to strengthen the reach of WEPN, ESPN reached local marketing agreements to simulcast WEPN on WLIR in Hampton Bays, extending WEPN's reach to eastern Long Island, and on WNJE in Flemington (for "New Jersey's ESPN"), extending WEPN's reach into the Skylands Region and the Trenton market. WNJE broadcast the WEPN signal full-time. WLIR broke off the simulcast in the summer of 2011 when the station was sold to a religious broadcaster. WNJE ended the simulcast with WEPN on December 3, 2012.

There were also partnerships with Syracuse University and the United States Military Academy to air college football games, but those usually aired on former sister stations WABC or WQEW due to scheduling conflicts. WEPN had overflow agreements with WNYM and WWRL, the former airing Knicks or Rangers games that overlapped with each other or with the Jets and the latter airing when there were two overlapping games.

==== Bidding for baseball ====
WEPN was expected to bid for the radio rights for either the New York Yankees, at the time on WCBS (AM), or New York Mets, from their longtime home of WFAN. Both teams had contracts that expired at the end of the 2013 season, with the Yankees purposely extending their deal with WCBS to expire at the same time as the Mets, for better leverage. It had been reported that WEPN had been looking to move to a stronger frequency to accommodate having a Major League Baseball team full-time. Ultimately the Yankees moved to WFAN, displacing the Mets, who signed on with WOR.

==== ESPN Deportes Radio ====
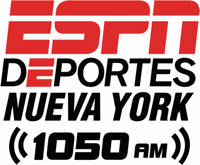
Logo for ESPN Deportes Radio Nueva York 1050 AM.

On April 26, 2012, Disney announced a 12-year lease of Emmis Communications' 98.7 WRKS, under which WEPN's programming would transition to FM, and the AM signal would be converted to a new Spanish-language sports format as part of the ESPN Deportes Radio network by mid-September 2012 (to coincide with National Hispanic Heritage Month).

The transition began on April 30 when WRKS, now christened as WEPN-FM, began to simulcast WEPN's AM signal as 98.7 ESPN New York. WEPN broke away from the simulcast on September 7, 2012, and re-launched as promised as ESPN Deportes Nueva York. At launch, the station carried the national lineup of the network, and local morning and afternoon drive shows (Firma ESPN and Zona ESPN NY). The station also acquired Spanish-language rights to the New York Jets.

On December 13, 2012, ESPN announced that it had acquired the rights to the Spanish-language broadcasts of the Mets, starting with the 2013 season.

=== ESPN Radio ===
On June 11, 2019, ESPN announced that it would be discontinuing the ESPN Deportes Radio network on September 8, 2019. It was stated that WEPN would switch back to an English-language sports format at this time. In September 2019, ESPN agreed to a two-year deal to carry at least 60 New York Islanders broadcasts; due to WEPN-FM's existing contracts with the Knicks and Rangers, most Islanders games are aired on 1050 AM, with select games on WEPN-FM, and previous flagship WRHU continuing to be the primary station for games not carried on either WEPN or WEPN-FM.

In December 2021, Good Karma Brands (now Good Karma Sports as of August 2026) announced that it would acquire WEPN. The deal closed on March 1, 2022.

== See also ==
- List of initial AM-band station grants in the United States

Preceded by WNBC	AM 660 in New York City; March 2, 1922-October 7, 1988	Succeeded by WFAN
Preceded by WFAN	AM 1050 in New York City; July 1, 1987-October 7, 1988	Succeeded by WUKQ
Preceded by WEVD	FM 97.9 in New York City; 1952 - February 1, 1989	Succeeded by WSKQ
Preceded by WUKQ	AM 1050 in New York City; February 1, 1989-April 28, 2003	Succeeded by WEVD

Preceded by 1010 WINS; 1944–1957	Radio Home of the New York Yankees; 1958–1960 (as WMGM)	Succeeded by WCBS 880; 1961–1966

Preceded by 77 WABC; 1962–1963	Radio Home of the New York Mets; 1964–1966 (as WHN)	Succeeded by 970 WJRZ/WWDJ; 1967–1971

Preceded by WCBS 880; 1961–1966	Radio Home of the New York Yankees; 1967–1970 (as WHN)	Succeeded by WMCA 570; 1971–1977

Preceded by 970 WJRZ/WWDJ; 1967–1971	Radio Home of the New York Mets; 1972–1974 (as WHN)	Succeeded by 1130 WNEW; 1975–1977

Preceded by WMCA 570; 1978–1982	Radio Home of the New York Mets; 1983–1988 (as WHN 1050 until July 1, 1987, and then WFAN)	Succeeded by 660 WFAN; 1988–2013
