= KMBI =

KMBI may refer to:

- KMBI-FM, a radio station (107.9 FM) licensed to serve Spokane, Washington, United States
- KYOZ, a radio station (1330 AM) licensed to serve Spokane, Washington, which held the call sign KMBI from 1974 until 2016
