= WSKQ-FM =

Tropical music radio station in New York City

- New York, New York; United States
- Broadcast area: New York metropolitan area
- Frequency: 97.9 MHz (HD Radio)
- Branding: La Mega 97.9

Programming
- Language: Spanish
- Format: Tropical music

Ownership
- Owner: Spanish Broadcasting System; (WSKQ Licensing, Inc.)
- Sister stations: WPAT-FM

History
- First air date: July 1, 1951
- Former call signs: WEVD-FM (1951–1989)
- Former frequencies: 107.5 MHz (1951–1953)
- Call sign meaning: "Super KQ" (former format)

Technical information
- Licensing authority: FCC
- Facility ID: 61641
- Class: B
- ERP: 6,000 watts
- HAAT: 415 meters (1,362 ft)
- Transmitter coordinates: 40°44′54.36″N 73°59′08.36″W
- Repeater: 107.9 WLEY-FM-HD3 (Aurora, Illinois)

Links
- Public license information: Public file; LMS
- Webcast: Listen live; Listen live (via Audacy); Listen live (via iHeartRadio)
- Website: www.lamusica.com/stations/wskq

WSKQ-FM (97.9 MHz) is a FM radio station in the United States, owned and operated by Spanish Broadcasting System (SBS). Licensed to New York, New York, WSKQ broadcasts in Spanish with a tropical music format. WSKQ-FM's transmitter is located at the Empire State Building.

== History ==
=== WEVD-FM ===
On July 1, 1951, WEVD-FM began broadcasting on 107.5 MHz, simulcasting the programs of WEVD (1330 AM), owned by The Jewish Daily Forward. Programming consisted of brokered ethnic programming, Jewish programming, and some pop standards and big band. Pursuant to a construction permit issued in May 1953, WEVD-FM moved to 97.9 MHz, and 107.5 went off the air. The transmitter was relocated to the Empire State Building in 1970.

Norman B. Furman was general manager of WEVD from 1968 to 1972. He initiated a variety of programs to serve the many ethnic communities in New York. The call letters were announced as WEVD, "the station that speaks your language". These languages included Yiddish, Hebrew, Italian, Greek, Portuguese, German, Russian, Japanese and Irish, all serving their various communities. The "Forward Hour", a popular variety show, was MC'd by Furman for many years. He had a major role in developing and procuring the most popular of all Jewish jingles: "Joe and Paul a fargenigen ... A suit, a coat kenst du krigen".

=== WSKQ-FM ===
In October 1983, the Spanish Broadcasting System (SBS) bought WVNJ in Newark, New Jersey, and converted an outlet that had broadcast a big band/adult standards format, into a Spanish adult contemporary station with the callsign WSKQ and brand "Super KQ". The station was led by Rafael-Díaz Gutiérrez, Raúl Alarcón Jr. (former DJ in Cuba), and Adriano García Sr. (CEO of SAR Records). WSKQ would become the New York market's fourth full-time Spanish station at that time, after WADO, WJIT, and WKDM.

In 1988, SBS negotiated a deal that would enable them to acquire 97.9 MHz which was occupied by ethnic WEVD. SBS had acquired 1050 kHz in October 1988, as the frequency's previous occupants, WFAN, had just replaced WNBC on 660 kHz. Since it was against FCC rules in 1988, for the same company to own two AM stations in a market, there was a problem in regards to what to do with the 1050 frequency. To solve this problem, the FCC allowed SBS to operate the 1050 kHz frequency as a non-commercial station. The call letters would be WUKQ, and would play Spanish adult contemporary music without commercial interruptions, while 620 kHz would become a Spanish oldies station. Finally, on February 1, 1989, the deal between SBS and WEVD closed, and SBS instituted a Spanish music format with the call letters WSKQ-FM on 97.9 MHz, while WEVD moved to 1050 kHz.

The Spanish oldies music format on 620 kHz would remain for several years after the deal, and in 1995, that station would take on a Tejano music format as WXLX. A couple of years later, SBS sold the station to One-on-One Sports and it became a sports–talk station.

As for WSKQ-FM, the Spanish adult contemporary format initially obtained mediocre ratings. Then in 1993, with the hiring of Vice President and general manager Alfredo Alonso, the station moved to an upbeat tropical format playing a lot of salsa, merengue, and dance music and using the name "Mega 97.9". At that point the station would flourish; as of 2005, it was one of the highest-rated radio stations in New York City. Its morning show, the syndicated El Vacilón de la Mañana, has sometimes reached number one among all morning shows in New York. The shows, such as the Luis Jimenez-era El Vacilon and its former Sunday night programs "On Fuego: The Daddy Yankee Show" and TRL Latino, were syndicated by CBS Radio and ABC Radio Networks.

The Spanish adult contemporary format was resurrected in January 1996, when SBS acquired WPAT-FM's license and transmitter.

== Ratings ==
In August 2013, "La Mega 97.9" surpassed "Z100 and Lite FM for the No. 1 position among adults aged 18 to 34 and 18-49".

In February 2017, WSKQ ranked No. 1 for Ages 18–34 and 18-49 in all of the Tri-State Area, regardless of language or format. These ratings have set "Mega 97.9 as the #1 ranked Latino station in the nation".

"La Mega 97.9" reached No. 7 in the "Leading radio stations in New York in November 2017, by ratings". According to the statistics, 4.6 percent of people who listen to the radio in the New York City Metropolitan area listened to WSKQ-FM for at least five minutes in each 15-minute period.

== Impact on the Hispanic community ==
"La Mega" reaches a wide population of Hispanic listeners every day. In an interview with The New York Times, Bill Turner, a radio consultant, stated:

Hispanics listen to the radio much more than English-language listeners do. If they are longer listeners, as Hispanics are, and if the station does a nice job with programming, which WSKQ does, then you have the formula for success.

Hispanic radio shows, like La Mega, provide Hispanic listeners a platform in which they can stay connected through the news, sports, weather, celebrity news, and comedy. Unlike other radio shows, La Mega is broadcast entirely in Spanish and therefore reaches the non-English speaking portion of the Hispanic community, giving them the ability to remain aware in society. La Mega allows listeners to call in to the radio and express their opinions on the topics being discussed or to request specific songs, giving them the chance to get involved. It provides "a vital and irreplaceable resource" for these communities.

In addition, they are "valuable sources of employment that impacts local economies". Local TV and Radio in New York has created over 150,000 jobs in Hispanic communities, improving the economy and allowing access to media based careers.

La Mega has segments throughout their show where they invite lawyers to talk about important issues that may arise such as "debt, credit restoration, immigration, and matrimonial law". This allows the Hispanic community access to resources that would otherwise be difficult and expensive to obtain.

== Tragedies ==
=== Junior Hernandez's death ===
Junior Hernandez, whose Spanish-language morning program was second-popular radio show in NYC for 6 years, died of heart attack on February 4, 1998.

He suffered from asthma, was stricken outside his offices at WSKQ-FM in Midtown Manhattan, said Jesus Salas, the station's program director. After paramedics attempted to revive him, he was taken to St. Clare's Hospital where he was pronounced dead. He was 34.

The night of his death, the radio station had to close its doors early because of the number of fans trying to sneak in to pay tribute to him.

=== "El Boy from Bonao"'s death ===
Raymond Reinoso, the Dominican DJ, better known as "El Boy from Bonao", one of the founders in NYC for nearly 18 years, died of cancer on March 6, 2007. He is survived by his wife Antonia and by his sister Socorro.

The President of SBS remembered Reinoso as a "happy, aggressive, optimistic and active man, who was also a great professional".

=== DJ Jinx Paul's death ===
DJ Jinx Paul, 39 whose real name is Jean Paul Guerrero was struck and killed by a hit-and-run driver on December 19, 2016, in Brooklyn near Sheffield and Jamaica Avenues in East New York around 4 am. He was taken to Brookdale Hospital where he was pronounced dead.

On November 9, 2017, Kevin Ozoria, 28, was arrested and charged with leaving the scene of an accident with fatality and tampering with evidence.

Preceded by WEVD	FM 97.9 in New York City; 1951 – February 1, 1989	Succeeded by WSKQ

Preceded by WSKQ	AM 620 in New York City; 1983–1995	Succeeded by WXLX (now WSNR)

Preceded by WUKQ	AM 1050 in New York City; February 1, 1989–present	Succeeded by WEVD (now WEPN)
