= WBGW =

WBGW may refer to:

- WBGW (AM), a radio station (1330 AM) licensed to serve Evansville, Indiana, United States
- WBGW-FM, a radio station (101.5 FM) licensed to serve Fort Branch, Indiana
- WBFB, a radio station (97.1 FM) licensed to serve Bangor, Maine, United States, which held the call sign WBGW from 1973 to 1986
- Lawas Airport (ICAO code WBGW)
