= WRVP =

Simulcast of WWRV, New York City
- Mount Kisco, New York; United States
- Frequency: 1310 kHz

Programming
- Language: Spanish
- Format: Christian music and teaching

Ownership
- Owner: Radio Vision Cristiana Management

History
- First air date: October 27, 1957
- Former call signs: WVIP (1957-2006)

Technical information
- Licensing authority: FCC
- Facility ID: 70273
- Class: D
- Power: 5,000 watts (day); 33 watts (night)
- Transmitter coordinates: 41°11′37.34″N 73°44′20.47″W

Links
- Public license information: Public file; LMS
- Website: www.radiovision.net

WRVP (1310 AM) is a Spanish language Christian music and teaching station, licensed to Mount Kisco, New York. Radio Vision Cristiana Management Corporation is the licensee.

The station signed on the air as WVIP in 1957. A tragic overnight fire on September 10, 1997, destroyed the station's studios. Despite community outpouring to keep the station on the air, station owner Martin Stone announced several days later that WVIP would go silent.

Stone died on June 7, 1998, and by December 1998, Suburban Broadcasting Corporation acquired the station from Stone's estate and returned it to the air.

Radio Vision Cristiana Management Corporation acquired the station in August 2002.

The station's call sign was changed to WRVP on November 1, 2006.
