= WPOW (New York City) =

Radio station in New York City (1924–1984)

- New York City; United States
- Frequency: 1330 kHz

Ownership
- Owner: WPOW, Inc.

History
- First air date: February 1924
- Last air date: December 31, 1984
- Former call signs: WBBR (1924–1957)

Technical information
- Facility ID: 73894
- Power: 5,000 watts
- Transmitter coordinates: 40°32′34″N 74°12′6″W

WPOW was a radio station in New York City that broadcast between 1924 and 1984, on 1330 kHz for most of its existence. It was last owned by WPOW, Inc. The station was closed down to allow its shared-time partner, WNYM (now WWRV), to broadcast 24 hours a day on 1330 kHz.

For almost all of its history, the station broadcast Christian religious programming, from 1924 to 1957 under the ownership of the Jehovah's Witnesses.

== History ==
=== WBBR and Jehovah's Witnesses ===
We believe that the radio is the most economical and effective way of spreading the message of the truth that has yet been used.

— The Watchtower, December 1, 1924

WBBR was established in February 1924 by the Peoples Pulpit Association—later the Watchtower Bible and Tract Society of New York—a corporation owned by the Jehovah's Witnesses, formally opening on February 24. The initial facility was located at Rossville, Staten Island. Radio owners on Staten Island complained that WBBR's religious programs and Bible studies, originating from a pair of 200-foot (61 m) wooden masts, were hard to tune out and blocked reception of other New York stations. It was the first radio station owned by the group: by 1926, there were six, including WORD at Chicago and four stations in Canada.

WBBR promotional poster

The station operated on 720 kHz, but not full-time. In 1927, after it objected to its assignment to share time with station WHAP, WGL was moved to share with WBBR, and the two stations wound up broadcasting over each other one April night in a dispute over time allotments. The result was a spring and summer of legal fighting among stations for frequencies, which included an application to share with WJZ, one of the most important stations in the United States, that attracted national attention. It was ultimately assigned 1170 kHz until the 1928 General Order 40 reallocation, when it moved to 1300 kHz, retaining its power level of 1,000 watts. This frequency was shared by three other stations: WEVD, WHAZ in Troy, New York, and WHAP, which later became WFAB and was deleted in 1938 when it was bought by WEVD. WBBR, WEVD and WHAZ moved to 1330 kHz in 1941 under NARBA. WBBR was allowed to increase power to 5,000 watts during the day in 1947. The station presented light music, Bible readings, lectures, and newscasts. Between 1930 and 1947 and again from 1950 to 1957, the station's main studios were at the Jehovah's Witnesses complex at 124 Columbia Heights in Brooklyn.

=== WPOW ===
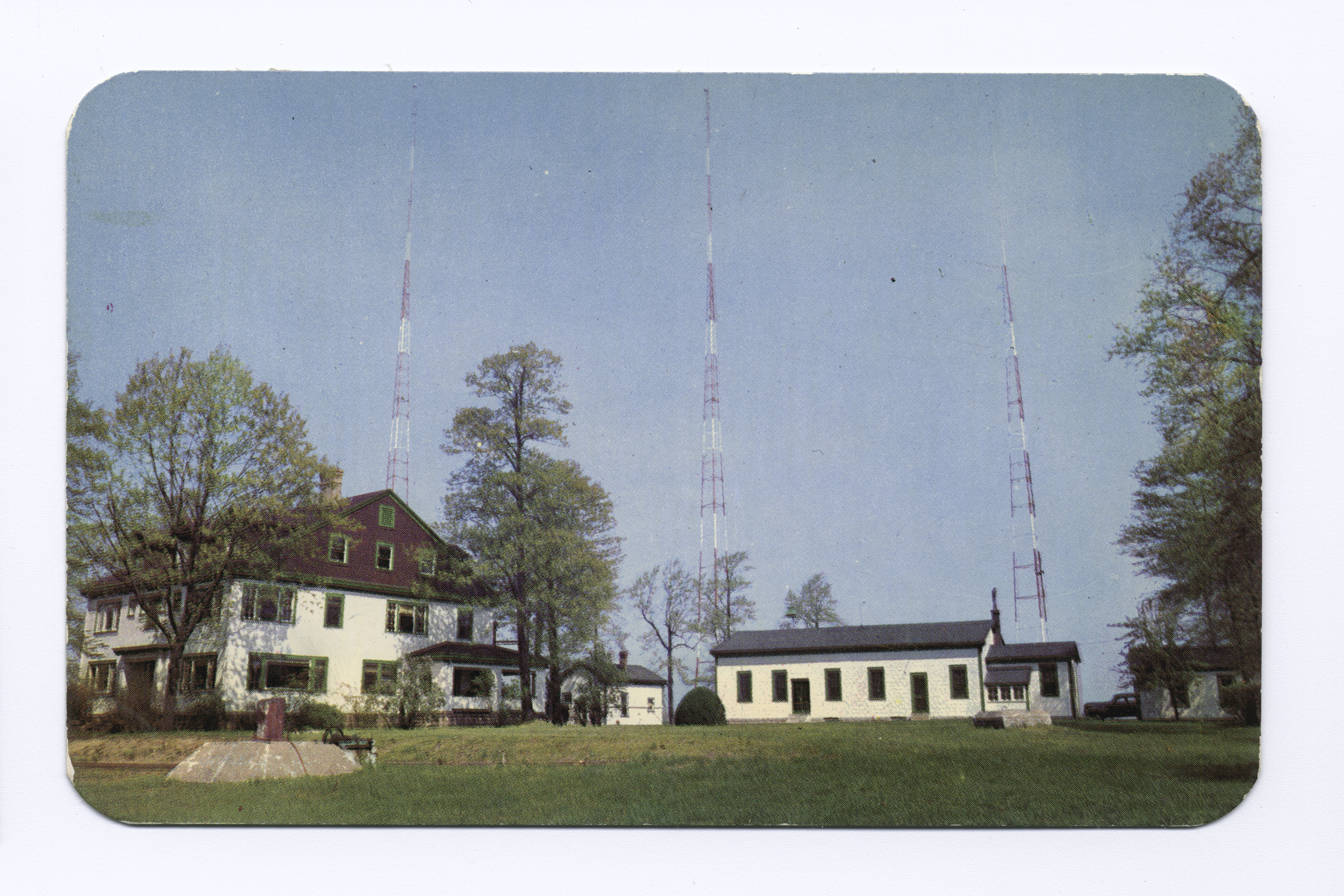
Undated picture of the former WBBR-WPOW transmitter site in Staten Island, as part of what was originally a 30-acre (12 ha) farm owned by the Jehovah's Witnesses.

In 1957, citing the ability to reach the faithful better through in-person contact and publications, the Jehovah's Witnesses sold WBBR to Tele-Broadcasters, Inc. of New York, for $133,000. The acquisition included the license and 18-acre (7.3 ha) transmitter site, as well as twenty chicken houses, a barn, two greenhouses and a swimming pool, representing more than half of a 30-acre (12 ha) vegetable farm owned by the Witnesses. In the decade, the group also owned a dairy at Long Branch, New Jersey, and a beef ranch at Lansing, New York. From one congregation in the New York area when WBBR signed on, the Jehovah's Witnesses now counted sixty.

Tele-Broadcasters changed the call letters to WPOW, effective April 15 (though the station did not launch until May 1), and moved the studio equipment that the Witnesses had in Brooklyn Heights to the transmitter site; it then received FCC approval to move from Brooklyn to New York, where its studios would be located at 41 E. 42nd Street. It was billed as the first new commercial station in New York in 14 years. It broadcast from 6 to 7:45 a.m. and from 5 to 8 p.m. daily. Tele-Broadcasters sold WPOW after two years to John M. Camp, owner of a religious advertising agency in Wheaton, Illinois, for $250,000. Camp primarily ran religious programming on the station. He also set out to eliminate one of the two remaining time-share partners by buying WHAZ in 1967 and turning it into a religious station broadcasting to the Troy area, operating during daytime hours only.

On December 31, 1984, WPOW went off the air in a deal arranged with Salem Communications, owners of WNYM, which had replaced WEVD in 1981. The move allowed one station on 1330 to go to a full-time operation for the first time ever.
