= KINE (AM) =

- Kingsville, Texas; United States
- Broadcast area: Kingsville-Alice-Falfurrias
- Frequency: 1330 kHz
- Branding: La Tejanita Christiana

Programming
- Format: Spanish Religious

Ownership
- Owner: Cotton Broadcasting

History
- First air date: 1949

Technical information
- Licensing authority: FCC
- Facility ID: 14018
- Class: B
- Power: 1,000 watts day 280 watts night
- Transmitter coordinates: 27°36′36″N 97°47′42″W
- Translator: (92.1 MHz) K221GP (Corpus Christi)

Links
- Public license information: Public file; LMS
- Webcast: Listen live
- Website: ganandoalmasparacristo.yolasite.com

KINE (1330 AM, "La Tejanita Christiana") is a radio station broadcasting a Spanish religious format. Licensed to Kingsville, Texas, United States, the station serves the Kingsville-Alice-Falfurrias area. The station is currently owned by Cotton Broadcasting.
