= WHAZ-FM =

Simulcasts WHAZ, Troy
- Hoosick Falls, New York; United States
- Broadcast area: Eastern New York and Southwestern Vermont
- Frequency: 97.5 MHz
- Branding: Alive Radio Network

Programming
- Format: Religious

Ownership
- Owner: Capital Media Corporation
- Sister stations: WHAZ

History
- First air date: July 4, 1991 (as WNGN)
- Former call signs: WNGN (1991–1998); WZEC (1998–2005)
- Call sign meaning: see WHAZ

Technical information
- Licensing authority: FCC
- Facility ID: 6765
- Class: A
- ERP: 420 watts
- HAAT: 361 meters (1,184 ft)
- Transmitter coordinates: 42°51′49.3″N 73°13′57.4″W
- Translator: See § Translators

Links
- Public license information: Public file; LMS
- Website: aliveradionetwork.com

WHAZ-FM (97.5 FM) is a radio station broadcasting a religious format. Licensed to Hoosick Falls, New York, United States, the station serves the easternmost portion of the Capital District, Bennington, Vermont, and North Adams, Massachusetts as a satellite of WHAZ. The station is owned by Capital Media Corporation.

== History ==
The station signed on July 4, 1991, as WNGN, a gospel station owned by Northeast Gospel Broadcasting. The station was sold to Aritaur Communications in 1998, who renamed the station WZEC with the intention of implementing a simulcast of Pittsfield top 40 station WBEC-FM (then at 105.5, now WWEI; now on 95.9). WNGN's programming was then merged into WNGX (91.9), which took the WNGN call letters. However, WNGN continued to run WZEC well into 1999, as the sale did not close until June 30; the next day, Aritaur sold WZEC, along with WBEC and WBEC-FM, to Tele-Media Broadcasting, who finally implemented the WBEC-FM simulcast by that September. By the following May, the station had again changed format, this time to a modern adult contemporary format, "The Point", modeled on sister stations WCPT (100.9; now WKLI-FM) and WKBE (then at 100.3, now WFFG-FM; now on 107.1). The station was sold to Vox Media in 2002, and shifted to soft adult contemporary in 2004.

Vox sold WZEC to Capitol Media in 2005, who changed the call letters to the current WHAZ-FM and implemented a classic gospel format on November 7, before switching to a straight simulcast of the AM station by April 2007. It is one of several FM stations used to augment WHAZ's coverage; the AM station must reduce its power to all-but-unlistenable levels at night.

== Translators ==
WHAZ-FM's programming was previously rebroadcast by four translators. The licenses for all four translators were cancelled by the Federal Communications Commission (FCC) on August 8, 2017, due to the licensee failing to comply with the terms of an FCC consent decree.

== See also ==
- WHAZ (AM)
