= WGTJ =

- Murrayville, Georgia; United States
- Frequency: 1330 kHz
- Branding: 97.5 Glory FM

Programming
- Format: Christian radio

Ownership
- Owner: Vision Communications, Inc.

History
- Former call signs: WKZD (1986–1999)
- Call sign meaning: We've Got The Joy

Technical information
- Licensing authority: FCC
- Facility ID: 23911
- Class: D
- Power: 1,000 watts day
- Transmitter coordinates: 34°22′12.30″N 83°56′53.30″W
- Translator: 97.5 W248DL (Murrayville)

Links
- Public license information: Public file; LMS
- Webcast: Listen Live
- Website: glory1330.com

WGTJ (1330 AM) is a radio station broadcasting a Christian radio format with 1,000 watts during daytime hours. WGTJ is simulcast on an FM translator W248DL at 97.5 MHz. The broadcast facility is licensed to Murrayville, Georgia, USA. The station is owned by Vision Communications, Inc.

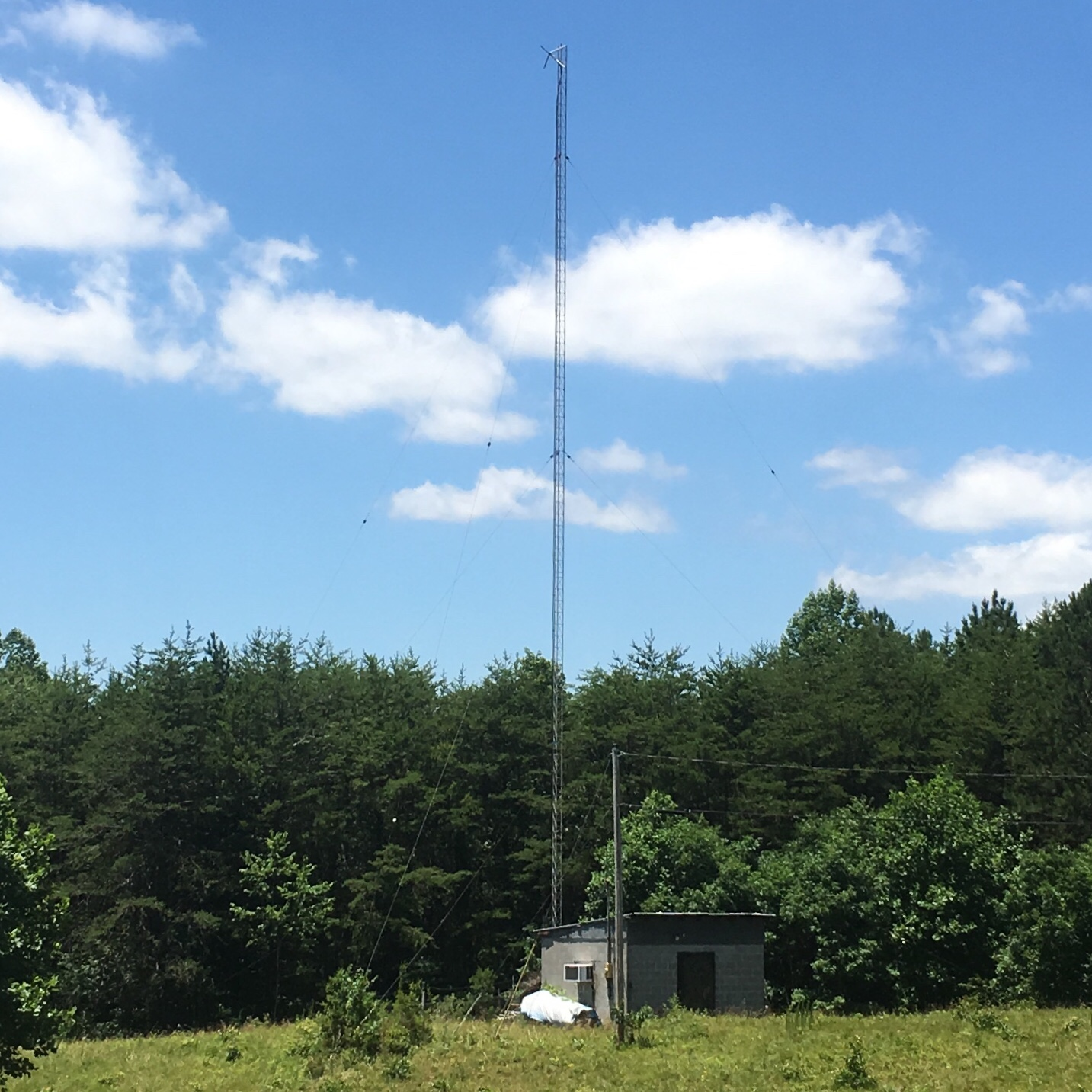
Antenna Tower and Transmitter in Murrayville, GA off of McKinney Road

== History ==
The station went on the air as WKZD on July 1, 1986. On July 30, 1999, the station changed its call sign to WGTJ.

Former logo
