= KYOZ =

- Spokane, Washington; United States
- Broadcast area: Spokane metropolitan area
- Frequency: 1330 kHz
- Branding: Worship 24/7

Programming
- Format: Worship music

Ownership
- Owner: 247 Media Ministries; (Hope Media Group)

History
- First air date: July 12, 1959
- Former call signs: KCFA (1959–1974); KMBI (1974–2016)
- Call sign meaning: from "The Wizard of Oz," previous format

Technical information
- Licensing authority: FCC
- Facility ID: 65985
- Class: D
- Power: 5,000 watts days 23 watts nights
- Transmitter coordinates: 47°36′57″N 117°21′57″W
- Translator: 95.7 K239CL (Spokane)

Links
- Public license information: Public file; LMS
- Webcast: Listen Live
- Website: Worship247.com

KYOZ (1330 kHz) is a commercial AM radio station in Spokane, Washington, owned by 247 Media Ministries. It airs a worship music radio format, known as "Worship 24/7".

KYOZ has a daytime power of 5,000 watts. But to protect other stations on AM 1330, it drastically drops its night-time power to 23 watts. It uses a non-directional antenna at all times. The transmitter is on East 42nd Avenue near Regal Avenue in Spokane.

Listeners can hear KYOZ around the clock on FM translator K239CL at 95.7 MHz, powered at 210 watts. On October 29, 2021, KYJJ (94.1), licensed to Boardman, Oregon and serving the Tri-Cities, went on the air as a brand-new license won months earlier as a part of the FCC's Auction 109, simulcasting KYOZ. This simulcast broke off when KYOZ joined the "Worship 24/7" network.

== History ==
Previous logo of KYOZ

On July 12, 1959, the station first signed on as KCFA. It was owned by Christian Services, Inc. and aired a Christian radio format. KCFA was a daytimer, required to be off the air at night, when AM radio waves travel further.

In November 2013, the station, then known as KMBI, was knocked off the air by copper thieves. It was estimated to cost thousands of dollars to get the station back on the air.

On December 29, 2014, KMBI broke away from its simulcast of KMBI-FM to bring Spokane its first Spanish language outlet. Selected programming from Moody Radio continued to be featured on the AM.

On September 21, 2016, KMJY, LLC was granted a Federal Communications Commission construction permit to move K237DS, an FM translator licensed to Walla Walla, Washington, to Spokane as a translator for KMBI, operating on 95.7 MHz with a power of 127 watts.

On October 11, 2016, the Moody Bible Institute sold KMBI to Radio Station KMJY, LLC, which changed the station's call sign to KYOZ and began stunting. On October 28, KMJY, LLC, signed FM translator 95.7 K237DS on the air simulcasting the stunt programming of KYOZ. The translator was issued a license to operate on November 29, 2016, as K239CL.

On October 29, 2016, KYOZ began airing a classic rock format, branded as "Oz 95.7". The moniker referred to the movie "The Wizard of Oz." The station carried the weekly syndicated Pink Floyd program "Floydian Slip."

On January 31, 2017, KYOZ was granted an FCC construction permit that would allow night operation of 23 watts.

On July 20, 2020, KYOZ changed its format from classic rock to Regional Mexican, branded as "Ke Buena 95.7".

Effective July 16, 2021, Legend Broadcasting sold KYOZ, KNHK-FM, and translator K239CL to Tom Hodgins and Christopher Jacky's Xana Oregon, LLC for $395,000.

On April 8, 2022, Xana Oregon announced it would sell the station and translator K239CL to 247 Media Ministries and would join its "Worship 24/7" network. The sale, at a price of $225,000, was consummated on July 18, 2022.
