= WHAZ (AM) =

Christian radio station in Troy, New York, United States

- Troy, New York; United States
- Broadcast area: Eastern New York and Southern Vermont
- Frequency: 1330 kHz
- Branding: Alive Radio Network

Programming
- Format: Christian radio

Ownership
- Owner: Capital Media Corporation

History
- First air date: September 11, 1922
- Call sign meaning: "With Holiness and Zeal" (backronym; originally randomly assigned by the Department of Commerce)

Technical information
- Licensing authority: FCC
- Facility ID: 8674
- Class: D
- Power: 1,000 watts (day); 49 watts (night)
- Transmitter coordinates: 42°46′35.28″N 73°41′8.43″W
- Translator: 105.1 W286DI (Cambridge)
- Repeater: See § Simulcasts

Links
- Public license information: Public file; LMS
- Webcast: Listen live
- Website: www.aliveradionetwork.com

WHAZ (1330 AM) is a commercial radio station licensed to Troy, New York, and serving New York's Capital District. The station is locally owned by the Capital Media Corporation and broadcasts a Christian radio format.

WHAZ transmits fulltime with a non-directional antenna on Van Schaick Island in Cohoes, while its studios are on Park Avenue in Cohoes. By day, it operates with 1,000 watts, at night it greatly reduces power to 49 watts to protect other stations on 1330 AM from interference. WHAZ's programming is also simulcast on four FM stations and one FM translator on the fringes of the market, branded the "Alive Radio Network".

== History ==
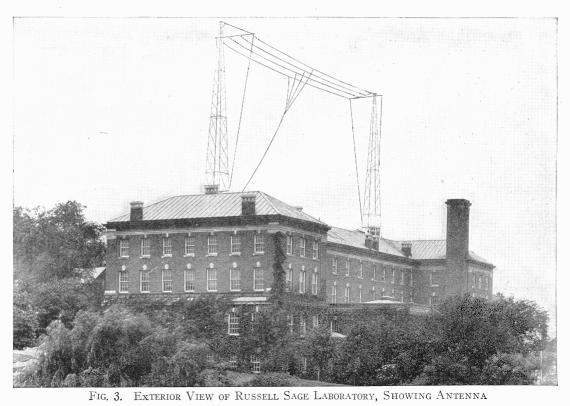
WHAZ was originally located at Rensselaer Polytechnic Institute's Russell Sage Laboratory.

WHAZ is the second oldest radio station in the Capital District. It went on the air more than a century ago, seven months after WGY in Schenectady.

On December 1, 1921, the U.S. Department of Commerce, which regulated radio at this time, adopted a regulation formally establishing a broadcasting station category, which set aside the wavelength of 360 meters (833 kHz) for entertainment broadcasts, and 485 meters (619 kHz) for market and weather reports. WHAZ's first license, for both broadcasting wavelengths, was issued on July 18, 1922, to the Rensselaer Polytechnic Institute (RPI) in Troy, New York. The call letters were randomly assigned from an alphabetic list of available call signs.

Unlike many pioneer college radio stations, the Institute only had limited previous experience with radio technology. Funds for construction of the station at the Electrical Engineering Laboratory were primarily provided by three members, all RPI alumni, of the Roebling family: Washington A., John A., and Charles G.

The station made its first formal broadcast on September 11, 1922. Later that month the Department of Commerce set aside a second entertainment wavelength, 400 meters (750 kHz) for "Class B" stations that had quality equipment and programming. WHAZ was assigned to this new wavelength on a timesharing basis with General Electric's WGY in nearby Schenectady. In May 1923 additional "Class B" frequencies were made available, with the Schenectady/Troy region allocated 790 kHz, and WHAZ and WGY were reassigned to this new shared frequency.

On May 3, 1927, WHAZ was assigned by itself to 750 kHz, before being reassigned later that year to 980 kHz. On November 11, 1928, as part of a nationwide implementation of the provisions of the Federal Radio Commission's General Order 40, WHAZ was assigned to 1300 kHz in an historic four-way timeshare with three stations in New York City-area: The Jewish Daily Forward's WEVD, the Watchtower Bible and Tract Society's WBBR and the Defenders of the Truth Association's WHAP. WHAP later changed its call sign to WFAB, and in 1938 was sold and its hours transferred to WEVD. WHAZ continued to share time with WEVD and WBBR, and in March 1941, implementation of the North American Regional Broadcasting Agreement resulted in the three stations moving to 1330 kHz. At this time WHAZ operated daytime only, except for Monday night programming.

With the launch of an FM station, WRPI on November 1, 1957, and with most WHAZ programming transferred to the school's carrier current station, WRPI AM 640, WHAZ became expendable, only being operated with a minimal schedule and programming classical music. In 1963 it was determined that the station was far enough from New York City to allow it to operate with unrestricted hours during the daytime, although timesharing was still needed at night. In 1965 RPI attempted to sell WHAZ in two parts, with the station's daytime hours going to the Troy Record Company for $15,000, and its nighttime allocation, which was Monday nights from 6 p.m. to midnight, being transferred to WEVD for $50,000. However, WPOW, successor to WBBR, successfully blocked the sale, on the grounds that it needed to approve any changes in the timesharing agreement.

In 1967, WPOW, Inc., headed by John M. Camp, purchased WHAZ from Rensselaer Polytechnic Institute for $65,000. The Federal Communications Commission approved the license assignment on June 12, 1967. Camp operated an advertising agency in Wheaton, Illinois, specializing in religious advertising. Under the Camps’ ownership, WHAZ adopted a Christian religious format and became a daytime-only station.

Camp died on June 6, 1972, at his home in Wheaton, aged 60. His obituary identified him as WHAZ’s owner and president and listed his wife, Ruth, among his survivors. Ruth Camp continued the family’s broadcasting interests; the 1973 Broadcasting Yearbook listed her as principal owner of Camp Stations, which included WHAZ.

In 1973, WHAZ nearly added an FM variant of its programming on 107.7 MHz, however the death of that station's owner led to those plans being scrapped by his children, in favor of country music, with the station becoming WGNA. The station was later sold to Paul Lotters, in 1986, who still owns the station today through Capital Media Corporation.

Lotters spent several years trying to increase WHAZ's power and operating hours, and gradually won approval to remain on the air 24 hours a day. However, its daytime signal only provides Grade B coverage to most of Schenectady, the market's second largest city. Its nighttime signal operates at only 49 watts, rendering it all but unlistenable outside Rensselaer County; nighttime coverage is severely limited even in areas close to Troy. However, all efforts to increase WHAZ's power failed, since the FCC was unwilling to risk causing interference with the New York stations (WEVD's successor, WNYM, had by 1983 purchased and deleted WPOW's license, allowing WNYM to operate on a full-time basis).

Beginning in the 1990s, WHAZ expanded to FM through the acquisitions of four stations, including WMYY 97.3 (licensed to Schoharie, New York, and serving the Mohawk Valley), WBAR-FM 94.7 (licensed to Lake Luzerne, New York, and serving the Saratoga Springs and Glens Falls areas), and WMNV 104.1 (licensed to Rupert, Vermont, and rimshots Manchester and Rutland). In 2005, WZEC (licensed to Hoosick Falls, New York) was acquired and converted into a classic Christian contemporary format for the Bennington, Vermont area and the Berkshires under the WHAZ-FM callsign, and later converted to an outright simulcast of WHAZ. This allows WHAZ to provide at least secondary coverage from southwestern Vermont to the Mohawk Valley.

== Simulcasts ==
Call sign	Frequency	City of license	FID	ERP W	Height m (ft)	Class	Transmitter coordinates	First air date	Former callsigns
WHAZ-FM	97.5 FM	Hoosick Falls, New York	6765	420	361 m (1,184 ft)	A	42°51′49.3″N 73°13′57.4″W	July 4, 1991 (as WNGN)	WNGN (1991–1998); WZEC (1998–2005)
WBAR-FM	94.7 FM	Lake Luzerne, New York	8678	1,250	220 m (720 ft)	A	43°18′17″N 73°45′5″W	1990	WZBR (9/21-11/1/1990)
WMYY	97.3 FM	Schoharie, New York	8677	800	273 m (896 ft)	A	42°37′51.2″N 74°15′59.4″W	1988	—
WMNV	104.1 FM	Rupert, Vermont	20596	4,300 horizontal	61 m (200 ft)	A	43°16′1.2″N 73°15′19.3″W	1989	WRQL (1989–1990)

Broadcast translator for WHAZ
Call sign	Frequency	City of license	FID	ERP (W)	Class	Transmitter coordinates	FCC info
W286DI	105.1 FM	Cambridge, New York	200332	250	D	43°2′20.9″N 73°24′54.1″W	LMS

== See also ==
- WHAZ-FM
