= WBGW (AM) =

Coordinates: 38.0533°N 87.5944°W

Evansville, Indiana; United States
- Broadcast area: Tri-State (SW Indiana, NW Kentucky, SE Illinois)
- Frequency: 1330 kHz
- Branding: Thy Word Network

Programming
- Format: Christian radio
- Affiliations: Moody Broadcasting

Ownership
- Owner: Music Ministries, Inc.; (Music Ministries, Inc.)
- Sister stations: WBGW-FM 101.5 Ft. Branch-Evansville, IN; WBHW 88.7 Loogootee, IN; WBJW 91.7 Albion, IL; WBFW 94.5 Smith Mills, KY; WBGW-FM Translator 106.5 Owensboro, KY; WBGW-FM Translator 93.7 Tell City, IN

History
- Former call signs: WJPS (1948–1982); WKKR (1982–1983); WVHI (1983–2016)
- Call sign meaning: We Broadcast God's Word

Technical information
- Licensing authority: FCC
- Facility ID: 24138
- Class: B
- Power: 5,000 watts day 1,000 watts night
- Translator: 102.5 W273DY (Evansville)

Links
- Public license information: Public file; LMS
- Webcast: Listen Live
- Website: www.thyword.us

WBGW (1330 AM) is a radio station broadcasting a Christian radio format. Licensed to Evansville, Indiana, United States, the station serves the Evansville area. The station is currently owned by Music Ministries Inc. and features programming from Moody Broadcasting.

== History ==
The station went on the air as WJPS on 1948-10-30. The station changed its call sign to WKKR on 1982-04-01. On 1983-04-21, the station changed its call sign to WVHI. On November 23, 2016, it changed its call sign to the current WBGW.
