= WWRV =

Spanish-language Christian radio station in New York City

- New York, New York; United States
- Broadcast area: New York metropolitan area
- Frequency: 1330 kHz
- Branding: Radio Visión Cristiana

Programming
- Language: Spanish
- Format: Christian music; and teaching

Ownership
- Owner: Radio Visión Cristiana Management Corp.

History
- First air date: 1926
- Former call signs: WJBV (1926); WSOM (1926–1927); WEVD (1927–1981); WNYM (1981–1989)
- Call sign meaning: Radio Visión

Technical information
- Licensing authority: FCC
- Facility ID: 54874
- Class: B
- Power: 10,000 watts (day); 3,800 watts (night)
- Transmitter coordinates: 40°50′42.36″N 74°1′10.5″W
- Repeater: 1310 WRVP (Mount Kisco)

Links
- Public license information: Public file; LMS
- Website: www.radiovision.net

WWRV (1330 AM) is a Spanish-language Christian music and teaching station, licensed to serve New York City, owned by Radio Visión Cristiana Management. Its studios are at 419 Broadway in Paterson, New Jersey.

== History ==
The station was first licensed on July 27, 1926, with the sequentially issued call letters WJBV, to Union Course Laboratories at 9024 Seventy-eighth Street in Woodhaven, borough of Queens, New York City. The station was established during a period when the government had lost the authority to assign transmitting frequencies. Initially reported to be at 640 kHz, as of December 31, 1926, it was reported to be on a self-assigned frequency of 1040 kHz. The call sign was changed to WSOM in December 1926, broadcasting from New York's Hotel Somerset, which took over in early 1927. Beginning June 1, 1927, the newly formed Federal Radio Commission (FRC) reassigned the station to 1220 kHz.

In August 1927 the Socialist Party of America purchased WSOM as a means of reaching a mass audience with socialist ideas. It became WEVD, making use of the initials of recently deceased party leader Eugene Victor Debs in its call sign. The station was purchased with a $250,000 radio fund raised by the Socialist Party in its largest fundraising effort of the 1920s, and was intended as spreading progressive ideas to a mass audience. A number of national trade unions and other institutions aided the Socialists in obtaining the station.

After the formation of the FRC, stations were initially issued a series of temporary authorizations starting on May 3, 1927. In addition, they were informed that if they wanted to continue operating, they needed to file a formal license application by January 15, 1928, as the first step in determining whether they met the new "public interest, convenience, or necessity" standard. On May 25, 1928, the FRC issued General Order 32, which notified 164 stations, including this one, that "From an examination of your application for future license it does not find that public interest, convenience, or necessity would be served by granting it."

Representatives of WEVD and 109 other threatened stations made their way to Washington, D.C. in July 1928 for two weeks of regulatory hearings on the issue. Station manager August Gerber responded with a statement emphasizing the importance of defending free speech and the right of political minorities to submit their ideas to a broad public. Party leader Norman Thomas echoed this perspective, declaring the value of WEVD and other community stations as a bulwark against a "big chain system" which tended to "standardize — to make robots and Babbitts of the American people."

The efforts of Gerber and Thomas ultimately proved successful, with the FRC approving the WEVD renewal application one month later. In the FRC's judgment WEVD had followed a "very satisfactory policy" of representing a range of political and economic perspectives befitting "the mouthpiece of a substantial political or religious minority." An editor at the New York Times concurred with the radio regulators' assessment, noting that revoking WEVD's license on the basis of its political views "would be both unjust and stupid."

Beginning in 1928, WEVD shared its frequency with WBBR (Watchtower Brooklyn Broadcasting Radio), owned by the Watchtower Bible and Tract Society, publishing arm of the religious group Jehovah's Witnesses. On November 11, 1928, as part of the implementation of the FRC's General Order 40, WEVD was moved to 1300 kHz, and was able to boost ts power somewhat. While the move had been sought by the Debs Memorial Radio Fund, the change ultimately solved little. WEVD remained underpowered, and had to share this frequency with three other stations: WBBR (later WPOW), WHAZ, the station of Rensselaer Polytechnic Institute in Troy, New York, whose broadcasts at night were limited to only Monday evenings, and WHAP.

Owing to the party's financial difficulties the station was taken over by the publishing association of the left wing Yiddish-language daily newspaper The Jewish Daily Forward in 1932. From the time of the 1932 broadcasting agreement through the 1970s the Socialist and Yiddish-language WEVD continued to share its station frequency with the religious group, transmitting 86 hours per week while leaving Sundays and early mornings until 8 a.m. to WPOW, and Monday nights to WHAZ. WHAZ was sold to the owners of WPOW in 1973 and turned into a non-interfering, daytime-only station, with WPOW taking the old WHAZ Monday night hours.

In March 1941, with the implementation of the North American Regional Broadcasting Agreement, the stations on 1300 kHz were moved to 1330 kHz.

In 1981 The Forward sold WEVD to Salem Communications, now known as the Salem Media Group, a large owner of religious radio stations. Salem renamed the station WNYM and made it a Christian formatted station from 6 a.m. to 4:30 p.m. while running foreign language religious shows after 4:30 p.m.

In 1983 Salem leased the entire broadcast day except from 6 a.m. to 9 a.m. to Radio Visión. The station at that time shifted to its current Spanish religious format. In 1984, WNYM bought out WPOW, the successor to WBBR, enabling it to broadcast full-time on 1330. In 1989 Salem bought WMCA and sold WNYM to Radio Visión. The Spanish religious format was expanded to broadcast all day, every day, and the station call sign was changed to WWRV to reflect the station's new identity.

== See also ==
- WEVD
