= KMZT =

KMZT may refer to:

- KKAR, a radio station (1260 AM) licensed to serve Beverly Hills, California, United States
- KDFH, a radio station (95.9 FM) licensed to serve Big Sur, California, which held the call sign KMZT-FM from 2012 to 2013 and 2014 to 2016
- KARW, a radio station (97.9 FM) licensed to serve Salinas, California, which held the call sign KMZT-FM from 2013 to 2014
- KKGO, a radio station (105.1 FM) licensed to serve Los Angeles, California, which held the call sign KMZT-FM from 2000 to 2007
- KSFN, a radio station (1510 AM) licensed to serve Piedmont, California, which held the call sign KMZT from 2000 to 2001 and 2003 to 2005
