= KSUR =

Radio station in Monterey, California

- Monterey, California; United States
- Broadcast area: Monterey Bay Area
- Frequency: 630 kHz
- Branding: K-Surf

Programming
- Format: Oldies

Ownership
- Owner: Mount Wilson FM Broadcasters

History
- First air date: 1955
- Last air date: April 30, 2023
- Former call signs: KXXL (1952–1957); KIDD (1957–1987); KXDC (1987–1991); KIDD (1991–2021)
- Call sign meaning: "K-Surf"

Technical information
- Facility ID: 7721
- Class: B
- Power: 1,000 watts
- Transmitter coordinates: 36°41′28″N 121°48′0″W
- Translator: 106.7 K294CA (Monterey)

KSUR (630 AM) was a commercial radio station licensed to Monterey, California. KSUR served the Monterey Bay and Santa Cruz area. The station was owned by Mount Wilson FM Broadcasters and broadcast an oldies radio format.

KSUR broadcast at 1,000 watts, using a directional antenna to protect other stations on 630 AM from interference. In addition, it broadcast on FM translator K294CA at 106.7 MHz.

== History ==
In 1955, the station first signed on as KXXL. It was owned by Pacific Ventures, Inc. The station was later owned by Robert Sherry and his wife Julie Conway. Sherry owned and managed the station until Walton Broadcasting bought it in the mid-1970s. Sherry had been an NBC staff announcer in New York. Conway was an entertainer who had a million-selling record, "Jingle Jangle Jingle". Walton, owner of several stations in the Southwest, brought Claude D. Barnett to Monterey. Walton had to surrender the license of KIKX, Tucson, Arizona, to the Federal Communications Commission (FCC) after his staff staged a phony kidnapping as a ratings stunt.

For many years, KIDD offered an adult standards/MOR format, using the name "Magic 63". On April 7, 2009, the station shifted to an oldies playlist comprising a wide range of mid-1950s to 1970s pop songs. This was prompted by KOMY's dropping of the oldies format. The mornings were hosted by Kevin Kahl, who had been an on-air voice for "Magic 63". Weekend host Ed Dickinson's long-running "Way Back Now" music-nostalgia program survived the format change for two additional years before being canceled in late May 2011. At the time of its shutdown in 2014, the station was carrying the ESPN Radio Network.

Structural problems with the station's towers at Reservation Road and Seaside Court prompted owner Buckley Broadcasting to take KIDD silent on December 31, 2014. The towers, more than 50 years old and badly rusted, were dismantled. Buckley (already liquidating its other assets) put the license up for sale. In April 2015, KIDD was purchased by Saul Levine's Mount Wilson FM Broadcasters, owner of Monterey station KBOQ and Los Angeles stations KKGO, KMZT, and KMZT-FM. Because the original tower site is now a protected wetlands, new towers could not be erected there. The sale of KIDD was consummated on July 31, 2015, at a purchase price of $50,000.

On October 23, 2015, KIDD returned to the air with a classical music format. It was operating under FCC special temporary authority at the KNRY tower, which is quite short for 630 kHz and nondirectional. At the previous site, KIDD was licensed with two directional patterns to protect 620 kHz in Hanford. It can't be permanently licensed as nondirectional.

In November 2019, Levine donated KIDD to The Balanced Radio Foundation, a nonprofit broadcasting company incorporated October 7 in Foresthill, California, but the donation was never consummated.

In April 2020, KIDD went silent. On November 12, 2021, Mount Wilson FM changed the station call sign to KSUR (which was previously used by 1260 AM until December 1, 2020) and returned to the air in December 2021 with an oldies format. On April 28, 2023, Mount Wilson FM surrendered KSUR's license, effective April 30.

== Past personalities ==
KIDD's glory days were the 1960s and rose back to the top of the Arbitron ratings in the early 1980s with a Top 40 format. KIDD remained a driving force in Monterey radio until 1985. In 1985, while facing strong competition from FM stations, under the direction of General Manager Claude D. Barnett, KIDD fired the entire air staff and joined a growing movement at the time in radio by switching to satellite programming. Many of the Central Coast's top personalities worked there, including Dave Andrews (the son of movie star Dana Andrews), Dave Bennett, Buck Buchanan, Byng Robbins, Phil Keller and Rob Mahr. Others appearing on KIDD include Jack Paar, Anthony Mafazolli, Jerry Teal, Ed Dickinson, Nick Souza, Sloan "Not So Loud the Neighbors Will Hear Us" Brown, Eileen Cashman, news stringer Jerry, Gene Rusco of KGO fame, and Rich Dixon who had a brief run at KGO in the late 1980s. Art Bell was on KIDD, when he lived in the Monterey area in the 1970s. Sean "Hollywood" Hamilton also spent some time on KIDD before moving on to Z-100 in New York and KIIS-FM in Los Angeles.
