= KYZZ =

KYZZ may refer to:

- KARW, a radio station (97.9 FM) licensed to serve Salinas, California, which held the call sign KYZZ from 2006 to 2013 and from 2014 to 2016
- KDFH, a radio station (95.9 FM) licensed to serve Big Sur, California, United States, which held the call sign KYZZ from 2013 to 2014
