= KMBY (AM) =

Radio station in Monterey, California

- Monterey, California; United States
- Broadcast area: Monterey, California
- Frequency: 1240 kHz
- Branding: KMBY 1240 & 106.7 FM

Programming
- Format: Classic hits

Ownership
- Owner: Hanford Youth Services Inc

History
- First air date: 1935
- Former call signs: KFUH (CP); KDON (1935–1949); KMBY (1949–1978); KESE (1978–1982); KNRY (1982–2020); KNBI (2020–2022)
- Former frequencies: 1210 kHz (1935–1941)

Technical information
- Licensing authority: FCC
- Facility ID: 35276
- Class: C
- Power: 1,000 watts (unlimited)
- Transmitter coordinates: 36°36′55.9″N 121°53′57.8″W
- Translator: 106.7 K294DN (Monterey)

Links
- Public license information: Public file; LMS
- Webcast: Listen live
- Website: kmbyradio.com

KMBY (1240 AM) is a radio station licensed to Monterey, California, United States, and serving the Monterey, Salinas and Santa Cruz areas. The station is owned by Hanford Youth Services Inc and broadcasts a classic hits format. It simulcasts via FM translator K240EV on 106.7 MHz.

== History ==
The station went on the air in 1935 as KDON. It moved from 1210 to 1240 kHz in 1941 when NARBA took effect.

Saul Levine's Mount Wilson FM Broadcasters, Inc., bought KNRY from IHR Educational Broadcasting in December 2013. The format was changed to jazz in early January 2014. In May 2014, KNRY dropped the jazz format and began stunting, first with a simulcast of Los Angeles classical station KMZT ("K-Mozart") and then with a loop of 25 alternative rock songs. On June 9, KNRY-FM (K294CA) became alternative rock "Alt 106.7". KNRY simulcast KMZT-FM.

On March 30, 2015, KNRY changed their format from a simulcast of classical-formatted KMZT-FM to adult standards, branded as "K-SURF 1240". The syndication was also heard on KKGO's HD2 subchannel in Los Angeles.

In April 2020, KNRY went silent. In October 2020, Mount Wilson FM Broadcasters transferred the station to Hanford Youth Services Inc but retained the callsign and studio equipment. The donation was consummated on December 7, 2020.

Hanford Youth Services relaunched the station as oldies-formatted KNBI—branded KMBY, using the call sign associated with this station between 1949 and 1978—in December 2020. The transfer required Hanford Youth Services to close its low-power FM station in Hanford, KOAD-LP, as a group cannot own a full-service and a low-power FM radio station at the same time. The KMBY call sign formally returned on April 20, 2022.
