= KARW =

Air 1 radio station in Salinas, California

- Salinas, California; United States
- Broadcast area: Monterey Bay Area
- Frequency: 97.9 MHz (HD Radio)
- Branding: Air1

Programming
- Format: Christian worship
- Subchannels: HD2: Radio Nueva Vida
- Affiliations: Air1

Ownership
- Owner: Prunedale Educational Foundation for Central California, Inc.

History
- First air date: 1997 (as KLXM)
- Former call signs: KLXM (1997–2000); KHMZ (2000–2001); KEBV (2001–2005); KEXA (2005–2006); KYZZ (2006–2013); KMZT-FM (2013–2014); KYZZ (2014–2016); KLXY (2016–2017)

Technical information
- Licensing authority: FCC
- Facility ID: 15197
- Class: B1
- ERP: 4,500 watts
- HAAT: 188 meters (617 ft)
- Transmitter coordinates: 36°33′08.6″N 121°47′20.9″W
- Translator: 102.9 K275CU (Monterey)

Links
- Public license information: Public file; LMS
- Webcast: Listen Live
- Website: air1.com nuevavida.com (HD2)

KARW (97.9 FM) is a non-commercial radio station in Salinas, California, broadcasting to the Santa Cruz-Monterey-Salinas, California, area.

KARW is owned by Prunedale Educational Foundation for Central California, Inc., and airs Educational Media Foundation's Air1 Christian Worship format.

== History ==
The station was owned by Wolfhouse Broadcasting until late 2005. Under Wolfhouse's tenure, 97.9 had many formats. Originally, the programming was Spanish contemporary music.

In July 2002, 97.9 became "97.9 En Fuego" - a Latino-leaning CHR/Rhythmic station. Included was music by Lil' Rob, Nightowl, N.O.R.E. and other Latino hip-hop artists. Voiceovers were by Angie Martinez; the slogan was "Blazin' Hip Hop y Mas" (Blazing Hip Hop and More). The format was launched prior to the Reggaeton phenomena, and subsequently did not have enough variety or promotional power to compete with crosstown heritage CHR/Rhythmic KDON-FM.

Notable Djs/Turntablist & Radio personalities of the former 97.9 En Fuego include the (SQRATCHAHOLIX) Alias, B-Klepto, Earwax, Neato, Romezee, & Fizzle.

In 2003, the station switched back to Spanish contemporary.

In July 2005, the station switched again, this time picking up a franchised format, Mexico's Exa FM from MVS Radio. "EXA-FM... The Orange Station." The station featured a bilingual CHR/Rhythmic mix with Reggaeton, Mexican artists such as Fey and Moenia, and American hip-hop tracks. The format was also not very successful, and morphed into a more Reggaeton-leaning station by Fall 2005.

In late 2005, 97.9 FM was sold to Buckley Broadcasting, owners of crosstown KWAV and KIDD. Prior to the sale, all Exa FM programming was moved to Wolfhouse's 93.9 FM frequency, which became KEXA-FM.

On January 3, 2006, 97.9 FM began broadcasting as CHR/Top 40 "Z-97.9" with new calls KYZZ. It became the first Mainstream Top 40 radio station in the Monterey Bay since the early 1990s. Artists included All-American Rejects, Green Day, Fort Minor, Nelly Furtado, Pussycat Dolls, James Blunt, Juelz Santana, Kelly Clarkson, Nelly, and Gwen Stefani. Also included were more Latino-based artists such as Pitbull, Frankie J, and Daddy Yankee. Programming on the station was under the direction of OM Bernie Moody and consulted by Rene Roberts, Freeze was brought in as APD/MD.

After two unsuccessful ratings books, "Z-97.9" flipped to CHR/Rhythmic "Jammin' 97.9" in early November 2006. Freeze quit, but much of the airstaff remained. The new format is again Latino-leaning, and also includes numerous "Hyphy" songs by E-40, The Federation, The Team, and Mistah F.A.B. Current ratings show very little change from the former CHR/Top 40 format. Notable jocks of the former Jammin 97.9 include Amy, Fredo on the Radio, and the world-famous DJFM. Local disc jockeys were also included in broadcasts, such as: DJ AJ BEE, DJ Jigar, DJ Luis Aldama, and DJ A-Z.

On February 1, 2010, Jammin 97.9 switched formats from CHR/Rhythmic to hits of the 60s and 70s, as Z 97.9.

In September 2012, KYZZ changed their format to sports, with programing from ESPN Radio.

In May 2013, KYZZ was purchased by Saul Levine, owner of country KKGO and classical KMZT in Los Angeles.

Station's logo as KMZT-FM

On July 31, 2013, sports KYZZ went silent and returned to the air with a classical music format on August 12, 2013. It was simulcast through translators on 95.1 and 106.7 in Monterey, CA. The station changed its call sign to KMZT-FM on August 29, 2013, as part of a call sign swap.

On May 20, 2014, KMZT-FM dropped classical music. The KYZZ call letters returned and the station switched to country music as "Z Country 97.9." The new format launched with 10,000 songs in a row, commercial-free.

In June 2016, Mount Wilson FM Broadcasters sold the 97.9 frequency to the Educational Media Foundation. The frequency will air EMF's K-Love contemporary Christian format.

On September 16, 2016, KYZZ changed their call letters to KLXY and changed their format to EMF's K-Love contemporary Christian format on September 19. The station changed its call sign again on April 17, 2017, to KARW and switched to EMF's Air 1 Christian rock format.

On June 23, 2017, it was announced that Educational Media Foundation would be swapping KARW to Prunedale Educational Foundation for Central California, Inc. for KLVM Prunedale, California/Salinas and its five translators. The swap was consummated on December 19, 2017. Prunedale Educational Foundation is associated with Calvary Community Church in Prunedale.

== KYZZ-HD2 ==
On September 1, 2015, KYZZ's HD2 subchannel switched from a simulcast of KYZZ's country format to contemporary hit radio, branded as "Hot Hits 106.7". (simulcast on translator K294CA 106.7 FM Monterey). KYZZ-HD2 went silent in June 2016 when KYZZ's main frequency was sold to EMF.
