= Michael Jackson (radio commentator) =

American talk radio host (1934–2022)

Michael Jackson MBE
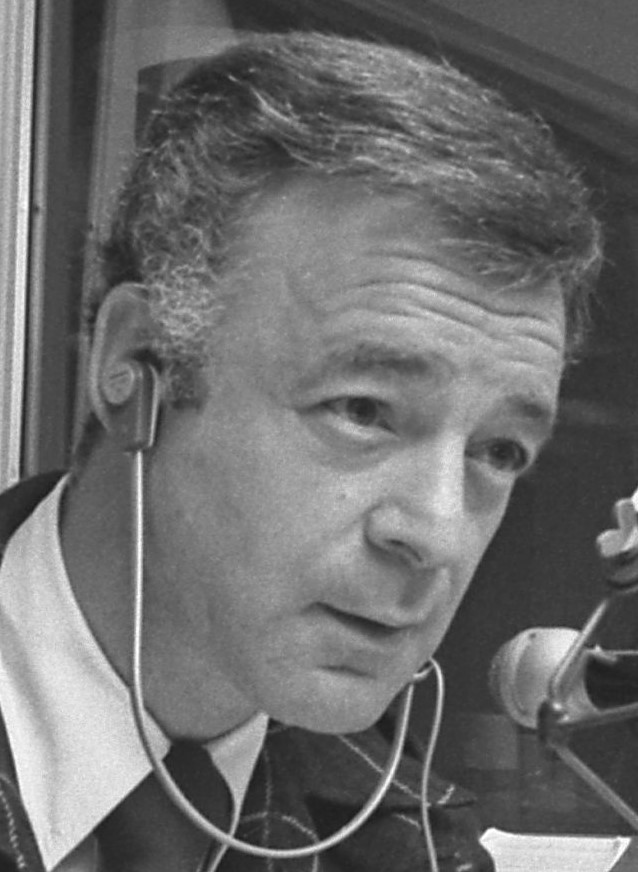
- Jackson in 1974
- Born: Michael Robin Jackson; 16 April 1934; London, England
- Died: 15 January 2022 (aged 87); Los Angeles, California, U.S.
- Burial place: Forest Lawn Memorial Park, Glendale, California, US
- Known for: Radio host and interviewer
- Spouse: Alana Ladd (m. 1965; died 2014)
- Children: 3
- Website: Michael Jackson Talk Radio

Michael Robin Jackson (16 April 1934 – 15 January 2022) was a British-American talk radio host. He was based in the Los Angeles area. Jackson is best known for his radio show which covered arts, politics, and human interest subjects, particularly in the Los Angeles and greater Southern California area in the era before "shock jocks". His show originally aired on L.A. radio station KABC and briefly aired on KGIL.

== Early life ==
Jackson was born in London, England, on 16 April 1934 and experienced the Blitz bombing campaign as a child. After the war, during which his father served in the RAF as a navigator trainer, his family moved to South Africa where he became a radio disc jockey and struck up what was to become a lifelong friendship with South African pianist and composer, Charles Segal. The Jacksons were appalled by the apartheid then dominant in South Africa, and they moved to the United States in 1958. Jackson had always wanted to be on the radio in Los Angeles, but first, he worked in cities like San Francisco, where he did a Top-40 show for station KYA. He made an appearance on the U.S. television program What's My Line? on 7 August 1960.

Listeners reportedly loved his British accent, but he didn't especially enjoy being a rock DJ. In fact, he hated rock music and ended up getting fired. When he was hired in the early 1960s at KEWB to do an overnight shift, he gradually phased out playing records and began chatting with callers. He got the reputation of being a problem-solver, and comedian Mort Sahl, a big fan of his, jokingly called him "the all-night psychiatrist". The police regularly monitored his show, with his permission, so they could trace the calls of the occasional listener who expressed suicidal thoughts and make sure the person was okay. Time magazine praised him for his ability to maintain a calm demeanour no matter what the subject turned out to be.

== Career ==
The Time article and other favourable publicity earned him some offers, and Jackson was finally hired in Los Angeles, where he briefly did the 7 p.m.-to-midnight shift at KHJ. Radio and TV critic Don Page of the Los Angeles Times took notice of him almost immediately, saying he was a "good talker and a patient listener," with an "elegant and flexible" command of the language. But when his ratings weren't what KHJ hoped, he was fired. Fortunately, the CBS affiliate KNX picked him up, but he found their format very confining. Finally, in 1966, heritage talk station KABC hired him, and it was a perfect fit. The station was having great success with their talk radio format, and they gave Jackson the 9 a.m.-to-1 p.m. (later 9 a.m. to noon) spot. Jackson remained with them for the next three decades, with critics continuing to compliment him for being "cultivated and enlightened". At that time, KABC broadcast the Joe Pyne show, and in the mid-1970s, when Jackson beat him in the ratings, he told a reporter that this proved "you do not have to be rude to be successful".

He was on The Michael Jackson Show on Los Angeles TV Station KCET Channel 28 from 20 March 1978 to 4 May 1979.

Jackson liked to book his own guests, and he became well known for talking to interesting news makers from all around the world, ranging from Richard Nixon's former counsel Charles Colson to economist Milton Friedman to Israeli military leader Moshe Dayan. He also talked to celebrities, psychologists and comedians, but he seemed to enjoy talking about current events. On the other hand, he was sometimes criticised for being too nice with his guests and not asking enough tough questions.

== Later years ==
Jackson continued to be successful into the 1980s, but radio was changing. Although regarded by many as a liberal, he was not alone in that point of view: KABC had several liberal hosts, as well as several who were conservative. Rush Limbaugh was Jackson's competitor, on the air at crosstown KFI, and Limbaugh had little difficulty defeating the veteran KABC talk show host. KABC's management ultimately felt Jackson's style no longer fitted with the modern "in your face" talk shows, the vast majority of which were conservative. On 3 July 1997, Jackson did his last daily talk show for KABC, to the dismay of his fans and a number of critics. Said one, "Jackson has served as one of the radio dial's last passionate voices of liberal politics...." The timing was especially bad given that Jackson had just won an award as "Radio Talk Show Host of the Year" from the Los Angeles Times. He was moved to weekends and ultimately let go in November 1998, after more than 32 years with KABC.

=== Return ===
Jackson would return to radio, finding employment at KRLA (1110 AM), where he secured good ratings, but was still not able to beat Limbaugh. KRLA was pleased, however, because he increased the size of their audience. They had recently changed their format from oldies to all-talk, and station management felt that because he was so well known in Los Angeles, Jackson would be able to attract new listeners. Jackson found himself out of work again when KRLA was sold in October 2000.

In addition to changing hands, KRLA would also change its programming, becoming a sports station. He was then hired at KLAC, only to be placed out of work again in 2002 when the station changed its format back to music. In 2003, Jackson was inducted into the Radio Hall of Fame; he was still a talented announcer, but at that point, he had no station to work for. The Englishman did some freelance work, producing interviews for all-news radio station KNX and doing some work as a news analyst. But he chose not to renew his contract, citing a lack of a regular time-slot as well as frustration when his long and thorough interviews were edited down into two-minute snippets.

Next Jackson joined the new KGIL 1260 AM; it had been playing classical music, but now the owner, Saul Levine, wanted to change formats, and Jackson was one of the talk-show hosts he hired. His first show for KGIL was on 29 October 2007, and he remained there for almost a year. His show was two hours in length, and his interviews of political guests with frequent call-ins were highly respected. Still courteous, still non-combative, Jackson was then 73 and as he told Steve Carney of the Los Angeles Times, he hoped that this time, he could settle in and work until whenever he chose to retire. That was not to be, as he was let go without explanation on Friday, 12 September 2008 upon his return from vacation two days earlier. He was not allowed to say a final farewell to his long-time listeners. The station reportedly decided to switch to syndicated programming.

In fall of 2009 Jackson returned to KABC as the co-host of an investment-oriented show called "The Financial Insider with Michael Jackson" airing Sundays from 11 a.m. to noon. As of February 2010 the program was still on the air. Jackson filled in for regular host Patt Morrison on her KPCC (National Public Radio affiliate at Pasadena, California) show on 18–19 July 2011.

== Personal life and death ==
In 1965, Jackson married Alana Ladd, daughter of actor Alan Ladd and his agent, Sue Carol. Alana died in 2014. The couple had three children, Alan Jackson, Alisa Magno, and Devon Jackson, and six grandchildren, Lucky, Taylor, Adeline, Emily, Amelia, and Hugo.

Jackson died at his home in Los Angeles following a long battle with Parkinson's disease, on 15 January 2022, at the age of 87.

== Awards ==
Jackson was repeatedly voted Outstanding Radio Personality of the Year. His peers recognised his entertaining and probing style with four Golden Mike Awards for excellence in radio broadcasting. In 1997–98, he was voted Number One Radio Talk Show Host of the Year. He was inducted into the Radio Hall of Fame in 2003. He was a Member of the Order of the British Empire and of France's Ordre national du Mérite. He held an honorary Doctorate of Laws from California Western School of Law.

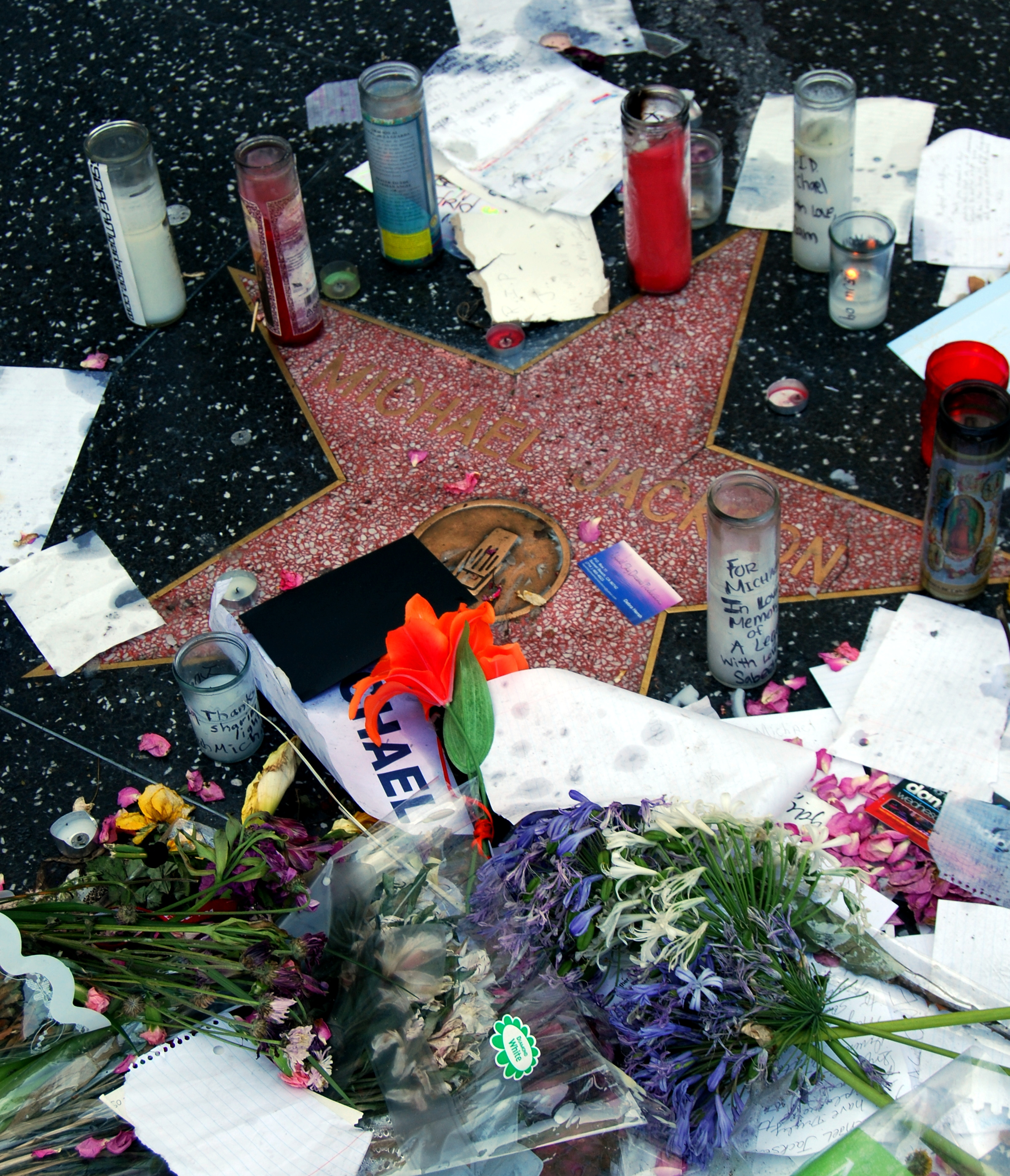
Jackson's star after the 2009 death of the musician of the same name. (Note the ribbon microphone, signifying a radio personality; musical artists have a phonograph icon.)

He has a star on the Hollywood Walk of Fame. When the singer of the same name died on 25 June 2009, the singer's star on the Walk of Fame was blocked off due to the premiere of the film Brüno at nearby Grauman's Chinese Theatre. Fans of the singer started a makeshift memorial at the star belonging to the radio personality instead. (The stars are near-identical, except for the "category" symbols below the names; a microphone denoting the radio category is on the radio personality's star, and a record denoting the music category is on the singer's star.) Jackson posted on his website: "I am willingly loan[ing] [my star] to him and, if it would bring him back, he can have it. He was a real star. Sinatra, Presley, The Beatles, and Michael Jackson."

== Filmography ==
Year	Title	Role	Notes
1964	The Munsters	TV Announcer	Episode: "Low-Cal Munster"
1964	Goodbye Charlie	Michael Jackson	
1964	My Living Doll	Dr. Karandas	Episode: "Foreign Relations"
1966	Camp Runamuck	Arnold Benedict	Episode: "Look Out, Here Comes Arnie"
1966	Way...Way Out	Roger Carlyle, BBC TV Announcer	
1971	Julia	The M.C.	Episode: "Swing Low, Sweet Charity"
1971	The Love Machine	Newscaster	
1972	The Rookies	Bevins	Episode: "Dead, Like a Lost Dream"
1976–1978	Police Story	News Commentator / TV Host	2 episodes
1977	Switch	TV Interviewer	Episode: "Dancer"
1978	The Hardy Boys/Nancy Drew Mysteries	Newscaster	Episode: "Sole Survivor"
1988	The Serpent and the Rainbow	Newscaster	
1990	Countdown (game show)	Host	U.S. pilot episode
1998	Moby Dick	Shantyman	2 episodes
2006	Commander in Chief	BBC Anchor	Episode: "The Elephant in the Room"
2011	Green Lantern: Emerald Knights	Ganthet	Voice, direct-to-video
2011	Green Lantern: Rise of the Manhunters	Ganthet	Voice, video game
2012–2013	Batman: The Dark Knight Returns	Alfred Pennyworth	Voice, direct-to-video
