= KIDD =

KIDD may refer to:

- KIDD (FM), a radio station (103.9 FM) licensed to serve Fort Mohave, Arizona, United States
- KSUR, a defunct radio station (630 AM) formerly licensed to serve Monterey, California, United States, which held the call sign KIDD from 1957 to 1987 and from 1991 to 2021
