= XESURF-AM =

Christian radio station in Tijuana

- Tijuana, Baja California; Mexico
- Broadcast area: San Diego–Tijuana
- Frequency: 540 AM
- Branding: Radio Zion

Programming
- Format: Spanish-language Religion

Ownership
- Owner: Radio Rys, S.A. de C.V.
- Operator: Zion Multimedia

History
- First air date: May 13, 1991
- Former call signs: XETIN-AM (1991-1997); XEBACH-AM (1997-2000); XEJAZZ-AM (2000-2002)
- Call sign meaning: Station was known as The Surf from 2002–2005

Technical information
- Licensing authority: CRT
- Class: B
- Power: 25,000 watts day; 100 watts night
- Transmitter coordinates: 32°30′44.6″N 117°6′38″W

Links
- Webcast: Listen live
- Website: radiozion.net

XESURF-AM (540 kHz) is a Mexican radio station licensed to Tijuana, Baja California, serving the San Diego–Tijuana metropolitan area. XESURF airs a Spanish-language Christian radio format. It is operated by Zion Multimedia Inc. located in Downey, California.

XESURF's transmitter site is located near Mexican Federal Highway 1D in Playas de Tijuana. By day, it is powered at 25,000 watts, with its signal heard throughout much of Southern California, including the San Diego and Los Angeles metropolitan areas, as well as northern Baja California. But 540 AM is a clear channel frequency. So to avoid interference at night, XESURF must reduce power to 100 watts at sunset.

== History ==
In the 1940s, 540 AM was home to KFMB in San Diego. When KFMB moved up the dial to 760 kHz, the government broadcast authorities in the U.S. and Mexico reserved 540 kHz for a Mexico-based radio station. However, for a few years in the 1980s, there was a U.S.-licensed radio station at this frequency, KSHO in Hesperia, California, and later KNNZ in Costa Mesa, California.

It was not until May 13, 1991, that the concession was awarded for XETIN-AM, which was originally licensed as a 5,000-watt daytimer and owned by Víctor Manuel Moreno Torres. Ultimately, a Mexican concessionaire took over operation of XETIN for Los Angeles radio station owner Saul Levine.

In 1995, XETIN became an all-news station branded as "K-News", simulcast with KNNS in Beverly Hills and KNNZ in Costa Mesa. The three stations attempted to compete with CBS Radio-owned KNX and Westinghouse Broadcasting's KFWB, both highly rated all-news operations. The all-news format was discontinued two years later.

The station became XEBACH-AM in 1997, and aired a classical music format. The format flip was spurred by San Diego's original classical station, KFSD, moving from full-powered 94.1 FM to a lower-power suburban station, 92.1 FM in Escondido. A year later, KNNZ moved to 1650 AM, leaving XESURF as the only station in the region broadcasting on AM 540.

In June 2000, XEBACH became XEJAZZ-AM with a jazz format relayed from KJAZ in Los Angeles. The format did not last long, and XEJAZZ promptly became XEBACH again in May 2001. In March 2002, motivated by low ratings and the move of the San Diego Opera to KPBS-FM, Levine opted to flip formats, and the station was relaunched with an adult standards format known as "The Surf", which aired on newly rechristened XESURF-AM and on KSUR in Los Angeles. The station spent much of the mid-2000s simulcasting that standards format until February 2004, then oldies until February 2005, and then adult standards again until October 2006.

In October 2006, the station ended its simulcast and flipped to a country music format. Although San Diego had country music on KSON-FM and KUSS, Saul Levine sought to fill the void created when KZLA-FM in Los Angeles dropped the country music format. The XESURF signal reaches Orange County, which Levine called "the center of country music listening". The country format was simulcast with KKGO starting on December 1, 2006. When KKGO and the country music format moved to 105.1 FM in February 2007, the format was still simulcast on XESURF. In May 2007, the station split from the simulcast to air classic country music as "540 The Zoo".

On November 27, 2007, XESURF changed formats yet again, to a news/talk format simulcast from KGIL. After KGIL dropped the talk format on August 27, 2009, XESURF temporarily carried an oldies format until changing to Spanish-language programming that September.

In March 2010, the concession was transferred to a Mexican company named Radio Rys, S.A. de C.V. It is owned by members of the Alonso Coratella family, which also holds the Mexican concessions for Entravision Communications's three Mexican stations, including XHAS-TDT and XHDTV-TDT in the Tijuana area.
