= 540 AM =

AM radio frequency

The following radio stations broadcast on AM frequency 540 kHz: 540 AM is a Canadian and Mexican clear-channel frequency. CBK, Watrous-Regina, Saskatchewan, and XEWA San Luis Potosí, Mexico, share Class A status on 540 kHz.

Because 540 kHz is a multiple of both 9 and 10, the frequency is available for use by broadcast stations in all three ITU regions.

== Argentina ==
- LRA14 in Santa Fe, Santa Fe.
- LRA25 in Tartagal, Salta.
- LU17 in Puerto Madryn, Chubut.
- Radio Pasión in Buenos Aires.
- Presidente Perón in Buenos Aires.

== Australia ==
- 4QL in Longreach, Queensland
- 7SD in Scottsdale, Tasmania

== Belgium ==
- ORU Brussels

== Brazil ==
- ZYH295 in Manaus, Amazonas
- ZYH610 in Canindé, Ceará
- ZYH755 in Goiânia, Goiás
- ZYH894 in Barra do Corda, Maranhão
- ZYJ450 in Rio de Janeiro, Rio de Janeiro
- ZYJ778 in Rio do Sul, Santa Catarina
- ZYK226 in Canoas, Rio Grande do Sul
- ZYK322 in Santo Ângelo, Rio Grande do Sul
- ZYK734 in Sumaré, São Paulo
- ZYL331 in Ipanema, Minas Gerais
- ZYI914 in Água Branca, Piauí

== Canada ==
Stations in bold are clear-channel stations.

Call sign	City of license	Daytime power (kW)	Nighttime power (kW)	Transmitter coordinates
**CBK**	Watrous, Saskatchewan	50	50	51.68°N 105.446667°W
CBKO	Coal Harbour, British Columbia	0.04	0.04	50.601111°N 127.573056°W
CBYW	Wells, British Columbia	0.04	0.04	53.106944°N 121.545833°W

== Chile ==
- CB-054 Melipilla
- CD-054 Valdivia

== China ==
- CNR The Voice of China, mainly in Anshun, Baiyin, Changsha, Dandong, Daxing'anling Prefecture, Guiyang, Haixi Prefecture, Honghe Prefecture, Jiamusi, Jining, Jinzhong, Linfen, Linxia Prefecture, Linyi, Ningbo, Ordos, Pinglinag, Qianxinan Prefecture, Qitaihe, Qujing, Shanghai, Shenyang, Suzhou (Anhui), Weifang, Wenzhou, Wuhai, Xi'an, Xianning, Xianyang, Xinzhou, Xuancheng, Yingkou, Zhaotong and Zunyi

== Colombia ==
- HJKA Bogotá

== Costa Rica ==
- TICAL Cartago

== Dominican Republic ==
- HICM Santo Domingo

== Ecuador ==
- HCFA2 Guayaquil

== El Salvador ==
- YSHV San Salvador
- YNOW Managua

== Ethiopia ==
- ETEBS Ghimbi

== Finland ==
- OFF Oulu

== Grenada ==
- ZBF-AM Morne Rouge

== Guatemala ==
- Radio Amistad (call-sign unknown) San Pedro La Laguna
- Radio Cobán (call-sign unknown) Cobán

== Hungary ==
- HAL-3 Solt

== Indonesia ==
- RRI Pro-4 in Bandung, West Java
- PM5DXA Barabai
- PM8CNI Trimurjo

== Iran ==
- EPM-3 Mashhad

== Japan ==
- JOSK Kitakyushu
- JOSG Matsumoto
- JOMG Miyazaki
- JOJG Yamagata

== Kuwait ==
- 9KV-1 Kabd

== Mali ==
- TZH Bamako

== Mexico ==
Stations in bold are clear-channel stations.

Call sign	City of license	Power (kW)	Transmitter coordinates
XESURF-AM	Tijuana, Baja California	25	32.512389°N 117.110556°W
XETX-AM	Nuevo Casas Grandes, Chihuahua	25	30.371219°N 107.980844°W
XEWF-AM	Tlalmanalco, State of Mexico	20	19.170417°N 98.846972°W
XEHS-AM	Los Mochis, Sinaloa	25	25.808889°N 108.969444°W
**XEWA-AM**	San Luis Potosí, San Luis Potosí	150	22.157944°N 100.92625°W

== New Zealand ==
- ZL1XC Tauranga/Papamoa
- ZL2XNR New Plymouth/Kaimata

== Nicaragua ==
- YNDW Managua

== Pakistan ==
- APP-1 Peshawar

== Panama ==
- HOPU Los Algarrobos / David, Chiriqui
- HOU 23 Los Algarrobos, Veraguas

== Peru ==
- OBX4E Lima
- OCX2D Trujillo

== Philippines ==
- DZWT Baguio City – (Catholic Media Network)
- DYRB Cebu City – (Radio Corporation of the Philippines)
- DXGH General Santos – (Manila Broadcasting Company)
- DYDW Tacloban City – (Word Broadcasting Corporation & Catholic Media Network)

== Russian Federation ==
- RW388 Orenburg

== Samoa ==
- 5W2AP Apia

== South Korea ==
- HLCZ-AM Hongsong
- HLSC-AM Jumchon
- HLSN-AM Changsu

== Spain ==
- EAJ15 Barcelona

== Taiwan ==
- CNR The Voice of China in Lianjiang County (transferred from China)

== Thailand ==
- HSAT-AM Bangkok

== United States ==
Call sign	City of license	Facility ID	Class	Daytime power (kW)	Nighttime power (kW)	Transmitter coordinates
KDFT	Ferris, Texas	145	D	1	0.249	32.513056°N 96.574444°W (daytime); 32.514444°N 96.573889°W (nighttime)
KMLB	Monroe, Louisiana	35249	D	4	0.026	32.621944°N 92.064167°W
KNMX	Las Vegas, New Mexico	58915	D	5	0.02	35.573611°N 105.171389°W
KRXA	Carmel Valley, California	9849	B	10	0.5	36.66°N 121.541389°W
KVIP	Redding, California	51177	D	2.5	0.014	40.623611°N 122.280278°W
KWMT	Fort Dodge, Iowa	38591	D	5	0.17	42.495833°N 94.209167°W
WASG	Daphne, Alabama	51141	D	2.5	0.019	30.745833°N 88.094167°W
WAUK	Jackson, Wisconsin	10824	B	0.4	0.4	43.333333°N 88.153056°W
WBWD	Islip, New York	37805	B	10	0.22	40.751667°N 73.213889°W
WDAK	Columbus, Georgia	60764	D	4	0.038	32.432778°N 84.950556°W
WETC	Wendell-Zebulon, North Carolina	18269	B	10	4.4	35.869167°N 78.432222°W
WFLF	Pine Hills, Florida	51970	B	50	46	28.481389°N 81.661944°W
WGTH	Richlands, Virginia	12043	D	1	0.097	37.083611°N 81.782778°W
WKFN	Clarksville, Tennessee	65202	D	4	0.055	36.541944°N 87.325556°W
WRGC	Sylva, North Carolina	73286	B	1	0.187	35.393056°N 83.193889°W
WWCS	Canonsburg, Pennsylvania	5349	B	5	0.5	40.289444°N 80.185278°W
WXYG	Sauk Rapids, Minnesota	161448	B	0.85	0.25	45.605°N 94.139167°W
WYNN	Florence, South Carolina	22048	D	0.25	0.166	34.218056°N 79.808333°W

== Puerto Rico ==
- ACE Roosevelt Roads Naval Station, Puerto Rico

== Venezuela ==
- YVUR San Juan de Manapiare
- YVOV La Villa del Rosario
