= KDFT =

Radio station in Ferris, Texas

Coordinates: 32°30′47″N 96°34′28″W

- Ferris, Texas; United States
- Broadcast area: Dallas–Fort Worth Metroplex
- Frequency: 540 kHz
- Branding: "La Poderosa"

Programming
- Language: Spanish
- Format: Religious

Ownership
- Owner: Multicultural Broadcasting; (Way Broadcasting Licensee, LLC)
- Sister stations: KMNY

History
- First air date: 1986 as KLCA
- Former call signs: KLCA (1986)
- Call sign meaning: Dallas/Fort Worth, Texas

Technical information
- Licensing authority: FCC
- Facility ID: 145
- Class: D
- Power: 1,000 watts day 249 watts night

Links
- Public license information: Public file; LMS
- Website: kdft540.com

KDFT (540 kHz) is a commercial AM radio station licensed to Ferris, Texas and broadcasting to the Dallas-Fort Worth Metroplex. It is owned and operated by Multicultural Broadcasting and airs a Spanish-language Christian talk and teaching radio format. Its slogan is "La Ponderosa" or "The Power."

By day, KDFT is powered at 1,000 watts. But 540 AM is a Mexican and Canadian clear channel frequency. So to avoid interference, KDFT reduces its nighttime power to 249 watts. It uses a directional antenna at all times. The transmitter is off Wickliffe Road in Bristol, Texas.

== History ==
=== Gospel years ===
The station began its broadcasting activities under Freedom Network's direction in 1986 with a Southern Gospel format the temporary call sign KLCA before making a permanent switch to KDFT two months later.

Then in 1990, the station was sold to Way Broadcasting, and changed its format to urban gospel, focusing on Dallas-Fort Worth's African American community. From that day on, it was known as "The Rainbow Across North Texas" (the station's slogan).

=== Change to Spanish ===
In 1998, KDFT again changed its format to Spanish Christian radio format under the same name and slogan until 1999. In 2000, Radio Unica purchased KDFT from Way Broadcasting. Then in 2004, its current owners Multicultural Broadcasting absorbed KDFT and the remainder of Radio Unica's stations after that company filed for bankruptcy a year prior.

Throughout the station's existence, it has operated as a daytimer, required to sign off at night. But in 2004, it received Federal Communications Commission permission to expand its airtime to 24 hours a day.
