= KOMY =

Radio station in La Selva Beach, California

- La Selva Beach, California; United States
- Broadcast area: Monterey Bay Area
- Frequency: 1340 kHz

Programming
- Format: Talk radio
- Affiliations: Genesis Communications Network; Premiere Networks; Salem Radio Network; Townhall News; USA Radio Network; Westwood One

Ownership
- Owner: Zwerling Broadcasting System, Ltd
- Sister stations: KSCO

Technical information
- Licensing authority: FCC
- Facility ID: 22694
- Class: C
- Power: 1,000 watts day 850 watts night
- Transmitter coordinates: 36°57′42.8″N 121°58′54.9″W

Links
- Public license information: Public file; LMS
- Webcast: Listen Live
- Website: ksco.com

KOMY (1340 AM) is a radio station broadcasting a news/talk format. Licensed to La Selva Beach (Santa Cruz County), California, United States, the station serves the Monterey Bay Area. KOMY was originally licensed to nearby Watsonville for many years. Damage occurred to KOMY's original transmitter site as a result of the October 17, 1989 Loma Prieta earthquake, and subsequently, new owners moved the facilities to the Santa Cruz area.

KOMY is owned by the Zwerling family and originates from sister-station KSCO's 1080 AM's facilities. KOMY was acquired shortly after the Zwerlings acquired KSCO on January 31, 1991.

== History ==
KOMY began in 1937 as KHUB, "The Hub of the Monterey Bay Area". KHUB became KOMY in 1957.

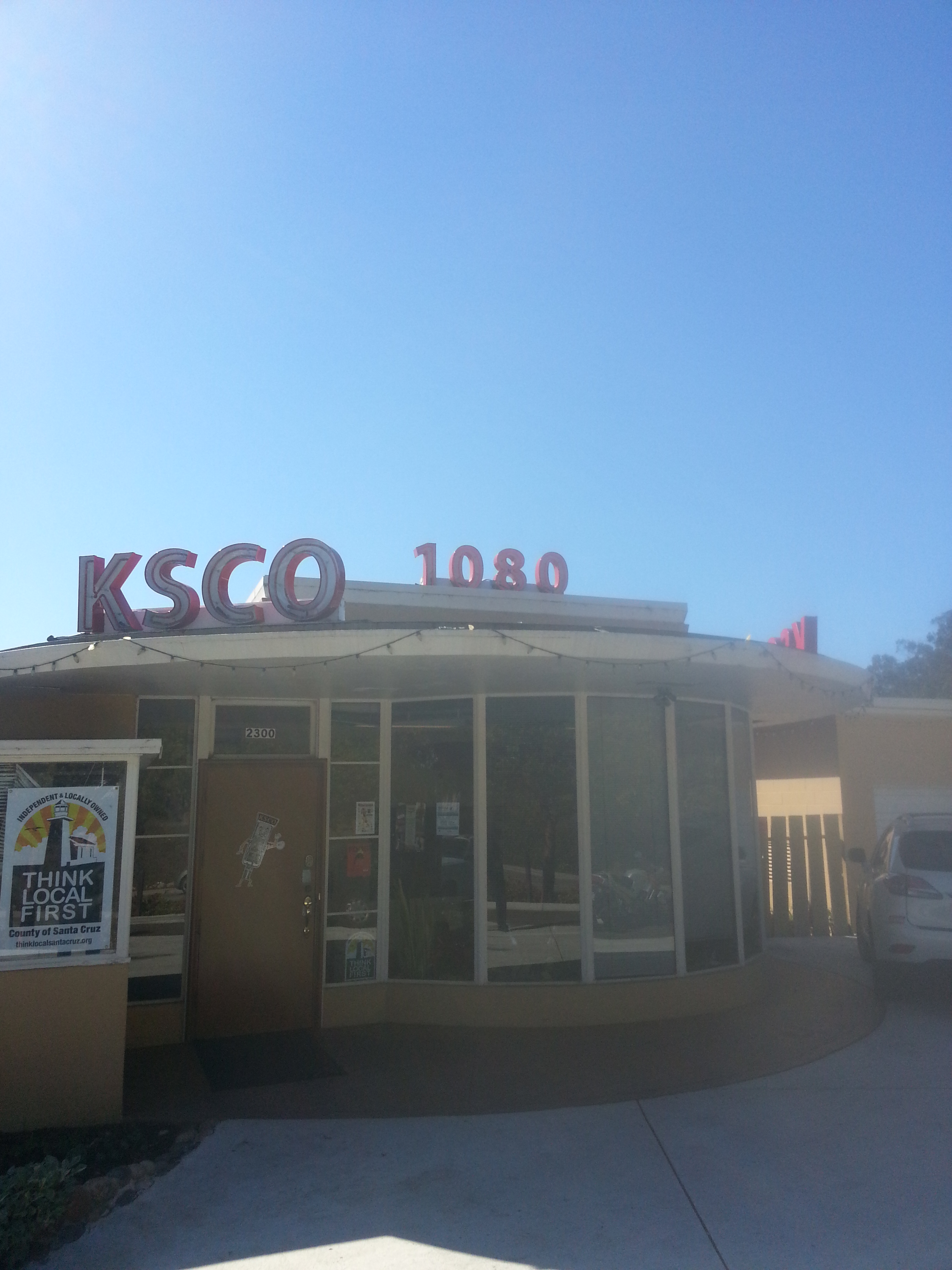
KSCO/KOMY's studios on 2300 Portola Drive in Santa Cruz, CA

Former logo

== Programming format changes ==
=== Liberal talk – 2005 ===
In the Fall of 2005, following different music and other programming over the years, KOMY began airing a progressive talk format, becoming an Air America Radio affiliate. Thus, KOMY was considered the "liberal version" of sister-station KSCO, which primarily aired conservative programming.

On June 28, 2006, KOMY dropped The Majority Report with Janeane Garofalo. According to station owner Michael Zwerling, this decision was because the show had failed to gain a single advertiser during the year that it was on the station. After three consecutive Arbitron zero ratings periods between January and November in 2006, KOMY would change formats in January 2007.

=== Oldies music – 2007 ===
On Thursday, January 25, 2007, at 10 a.m., KOMY 1340 dropped the progressive talk format and went to a 1950s/1960s 'oldies' format. For nearly two months, beginning on January 25, the original Oldies programming broadcast on the air by KOMY was fed via the Bay Area Radio Museum's Internet audio server, with custom "KOMY 1340" PAMS jingles that were freshly recorded for the station.

On March 20, 2007, KOMY began 'stunting,' using construction sound effects and promoting roughly every four minutes that KOMY would return with a better signal and programming. Two days later, KOMY adopted the Jones Satellite Networks' oldies format.

This format change was a return to the roots of KOMY 1340, a popular Top-40 station back in the 1960s, when it was very briefly the home of radio legend Robert W. Morgan early in his career.

=== Adult standards music – 2009 ===
In the first week of April 2009, KOMY management decided that they were no longer satisfied with Jones' oldies format, which had changed as a result of recent radio network mergers. For no more than a few days, KOMY was basically simulcasting sister station KSCO's talk programming. There was now no Oldies format station in the Monterey Bay Area AM market.

Then KIDD (formerly known as 'Magic 63' ) seized on this opportunity and without notice immediately changed its format from an Adult Standards/Big Band format to an Oldies format as Oldies 630. Magic 63's listeners were quickly in an uproar over the loss of the only Standards station in the market.

Recognizing a loyal listener demographic, KOMY quickly followed KIDD's change and immediately adopted a hybrid Adult Standards format. The music and formatics adopted by KOMY, including the Magic & Memories imaging, were put in place by David Jackson of the Bay Area Radio Museum, with voice imaging by KSCO/KOMY production director Bill Graff.

=== Current programming – 2017 ===
Currently, KOMY during the weekdays airs programs from the Genesis Communications Network and the Salem Radio Network in addition, the station originates the health show, "Dead Doctors Don't Lie" with Dr. Joel Wallach. On weekends, KOMY simulcasts sister station KSCO's programming. Like KSCO, KOMY relies on commissions from the sale of Wallach's nutritional supplements as its primary source of revenue.

Former KOMY 1340 logo until 2009
