= KSCO =

Talk radio station in Santa Cruz, California

- Santa Cruz, California; United States
- Broadcast area: Monterey-Salinas-Santa Cruz
- Frequency: 1080 kHz
- Branding: KSCO AM 1080 & FM 104.1

Programming
- Format: Talk radio
- Affiliations: Premiere Networks; Salem Radio Network; Townhall News; Westwood One

Ownership
- Owner: Zwerling Broadcasting System, Ltd
- Sister stations: KOMY

History
- First air date: September 21, 1947
- Former call signs: KLRS (1988–1989)
- Call sign meaning: "Santa Cruz's Own"

Technical information
- Licensing authority: FCC
- Facility ID: 41594
- Class: D
- Power: 10,000 watts (day); 28 watts (night)
- Transmitter coordinates: 36°57′41.5″N 121°58′55.3″W
- Translators: 95.7 K239CN (Watsonville); 104.1 K281CA (Santa Cruz); 107.9 K300DD (Watsonville)

Links
- Public license information: Public file; LMS
- Webcast: Listen live
- Website: ksco.com

KSCO (1080 AM) is a commercial radio station licensed to Santa Cruz, California, United States, serving Monterey, Salinas and much of Central California. Owned by Zwerling Broadcasting System, Ltd, it features a talk radio format with studios on Portola Drive in Santa Cruz.

KSCO also has three translator stations to rebroadcast its programming on the FM dial.

== History ==
KSCO signed on the air on September 21, 1947. It originally was powered at 1,000 watts by day and was housed in a distinctive art deco building, which was constructed for the station, and still broadcasts there today. The founder was Charles Vernon Berlin, who also served as general manager and chief engineer. In 1962, he added 99.1 KSCO-FM (now KSQL).

In 1986, Berlin sold KSCO-AM-FM to Fuller-Jeffrey Broadcasting which owned numerous stations around the country. The AM station went to an automated format of adult standards. On March 10, 1987, KSCO-FM changed its call letters to KLRS (Colors) and its format to a new-age music format, the first station in North America to do so, with Mark Hammond as program director and Jay Peterson music director.

Since 1991, KSCO has been owned by the Zwerling family and has a talk radio format. The Zwerlings later acquired another local AM station, 1340 KOMY. Both Michael and his mother Kay Zwerling took an active role in the station with the former regularly hosting the call-in show Saturday Special and the latter writing and voicing politically conservative commentaries on a variety of topics, especially politics and current events. On January 3, 2017 Kay Zwerling died at 95 years old.

Logo before translator sign on

On September 25, 2006, the offices of KSCO and KOMY received an envelope containing white powder. The envelope, which had no return address and contained no letter, was addressed to "AUNTIE KSCO" in handwriting described by Program Director Rosemary Chalmers as "chicken-scratch." Emergency response teams arrived on scene, and all KSCO personnel in the building were evacuated by a HazMat crew. By the evening of Tuesday, September 26, an FBI lab had determined that the powder was inert, and KSCO/KOMY's broadcast studios were deemed safe. Regular broadcasting resumed at 8 p.m. None of the four people who came in contact with the envelope experienced symptoms of any illness.

On October 24, 2022, the FCC proposed a $20,000 fine for Zwerling Broadcasting System, because KSCO had been operating outside of its licensed nighttime parameters since late 1996. On December 15, 2022, the FCC denied Zwerling Broadcasting's appeal, and affirmed the $20,000 fine for KSCO.

Apparently as a consequence of the cited long-term unauthorized nighttime operations, KSCO was directed to apply for a daytime-only (Class D) license, with nighttime power sufficiently reduced to fully protect KRLD (AM). The application was submitted, and authorization was granted. The application requested 0.028 kW (twenty-eight watts) nights, non-directionally. Daytime power remains 10 kW, also non-directionally.

The new license for 28 watts at night was granted on April 18, 2024.

== Programming ==
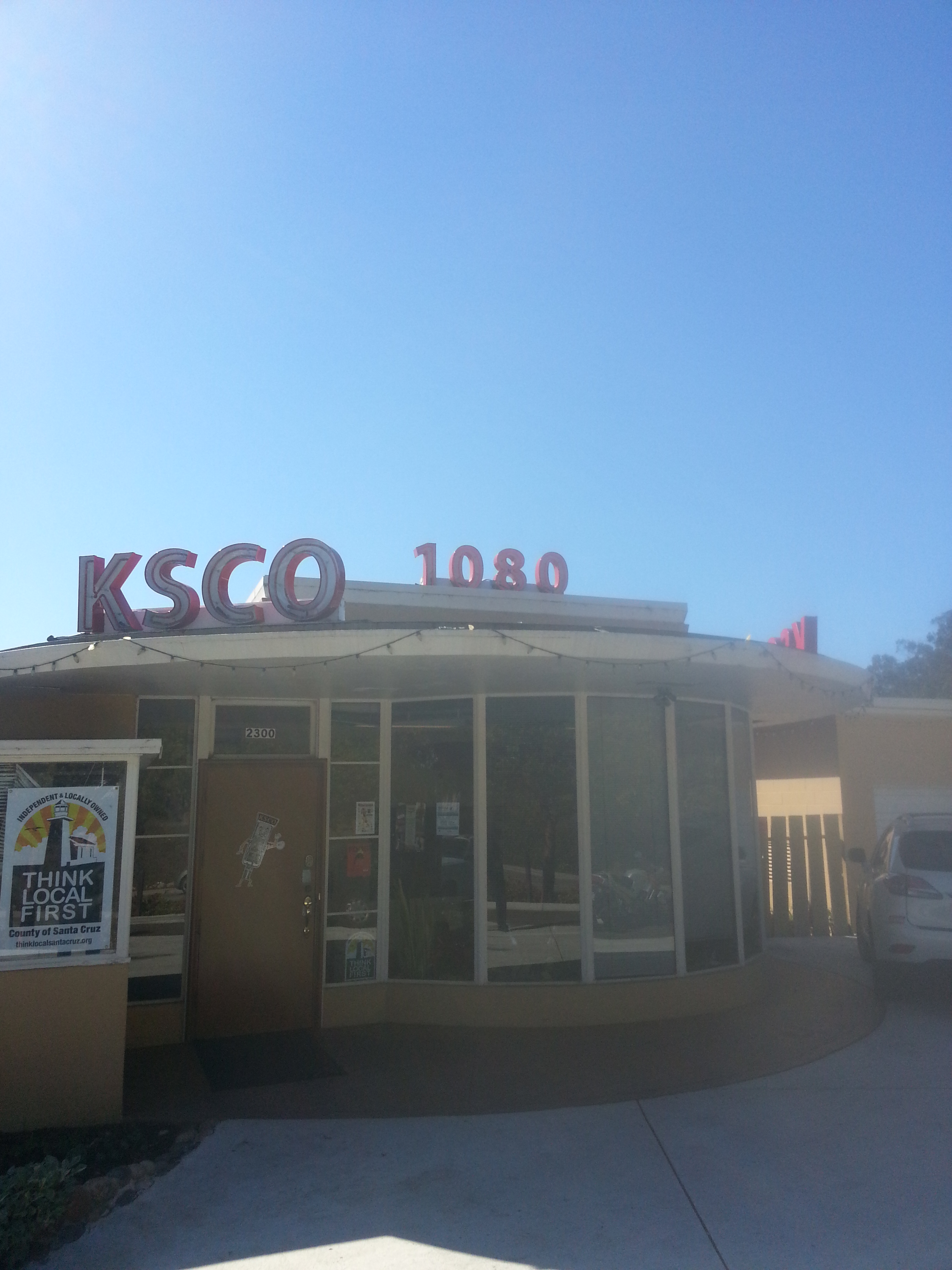
KSCO/KOMY's studios on 2300 Portola Drive in Santa Cruz, CA

The station programming is a mix of local, syndicated and brokered programming (meaning a person can purchase an available hour of time and produce their own show). A host can either pay for the hour out of his or her own pocket or find local businesses to sponsor the show in exchange for advertising.

The programming is a mix of local and national shows. The morning hours feature a syndicated news and commentary show called Armstrong & Getty, followed by NewsMax host Rob Carson, financial advisor Dave Ramsey, and various local shows covering money management, real estate law, and everything about cars. Afternoon drive time comedy and local interest is hosted by Dave Michaels. Evening and nighttime offerings include Dr. Joel Wallach, Wayne Allen Root, and Coast to Coast AM with George Noory.

KSCO does not subscribe to rating services, so listenership is unreported.

Past KSCO local programs were hosted by Rosemary Chalmers, Michael Olson, Vernon Bohr, Ethan Bearman, Daryl Alan Gault, Rob Roberts, Brian Maloney, and more. Current local hosts include Pamela Fugitt-Hetrick, Duncan McCollum, and Dean Sutton.

== Translators ==
Broadcast translators for KSCO
Call sign	Frequency	City of license	FID	ERP (W)	Class	Transmitter coordinates	FCC info
K281CA	104.1 FM	Santa Cruz, California	153874	190 (vert.)	D	37°3′27.8″N 121°46′33.8″W	LMS
K300DD	107.9 FM	Watsonville, California	88248	24 (vert.)	D	37°3′27.8″N 121°46′33.8″W	LMS
K239CN	95.7 FM	Watsonville, California	142038	37 (vert.)	D	37°3′27.8″N 121°46′33.8″W	LMS

On August 3, 2015, KSCO launched an FM simulcast on 104.1 MHz with translator K281CA from the Mt. Madonna Tower. It uses a directional antenna with most of the signal directed at Santa Cruz.

On May 11, 2017 KSCO was granted a license for translator K300DD on 107.9 MHz from the Mt. Madonna Tower. It uses a directional antenna with most of the signal directed at Morgan Hill.

On June 8, 2017 KSCO was granted a license for translator K239CN on 95.7 MHz from the Mt. Madonna tower. It uses a directional antenna with most of the signal directed at Gilroy.
