= Leroy Hurte =

American musician, businessman (1915–2011)

Leroy E. Hurte
- Born: May 2, 1915; Muskogee, Oklahoma, United States
- Died: April 16, 2011 (aged 95)
- Burial place: Sunset Hills Memorial Park, Apple Valley, California, United States
- Other name: LeRoy Hurte
- Education: Jefferson High School, Juilliard School
- Occupations: Businessman, vocalist, music conductor, educator, composer, author, record producer

Leroy E. Hurte (May 2, 1915 – April 16, 2011), was an American businessman, music conductor, composer, educator, author, guitar player and vocalist, music store owner, and record producer. He was one of the few Black symphony conductors in the United States. Hurte was active in Los Angeles, California. He was a member of the music group The Four Blackbirds, an owner of the Flash Records store and Bronze Recording Company. He was the founding conductor of Angel City Symphony Orchestra, had a sheet music business, and created music publications. For a few year he owned a radio station. He wrote and published The Magic of Music: An Autobiography Bronze-Lyric Publishing Co, Apple Valley, California in 1997. Ball Records issued a record of him conducting the Angel City Symphony (CAM 1502 VG). One of the pieces performed is by William Grant Still. He was a baritone and played guitar.

== Early life and education ==
Leroy E. Hurte was born in 1915, in Muskogee, Oklahoma, his father was Black and his mother was a member of the Creek tribe. His family moved in 1927 to Los Angeles, California, where he attended Jefferson High School.

Huerte studied at Juilliard School in New York City. Additionally he studied under Léon Barzin, Darrell Calker, Everett Lee, and Emanuel Balaban.

== Career ==
From 1938 to 1939, Hurte operated Flash Record Store in Los Angeles. He was an owner and producer of Bronze Recording Company in Los Angeles, from 1939 to 1950.

Hurte was the founding conductor of the Angel City Symphony Orchestra, from 1958 to 1968. He also worked as a guest conductor at the Fresno Philharmonic Orchestra, Compton Symphony, Los Angeles Philharmonic Orchestra, and Inglewood Philharmonic.

He established a music school, Leroy Hurte School of Music, in Los Angeles from 1958 to 1960.

From 1960 until 1968, Hurte operated Lyric Music Store in Los Angeles. He also sold his sheet music. Hurte was the publisher of Lyric magazine, active from 1958 until 1967 in Los Angeles, and later re-established the magazine with the same name in May 1970 in Hanford, California. Hurte owned radio station KOAD-LP in Hanford, California, from 1968 to 1971.

In July 1995, Hurte was interviewed for three days by Steven L. Isoardi from the UCLA Oral History Program, where he discussed his early life and work.

== Filmography ==
- Memories and Melodies (1935), a Metro-Goldwyn-Mayer short musical film directed by James A. FitzPatrick, about festivities on a Kentucky plantation

== Publications ==
- Hurte, Leroy E. (1984). So You're the Choir Director? A Handbook for the Choir and its Director. Los Angeles, California: Lyric Pub. Co.
- Hurte, Leroy E. (1997). The Magic of Music: An Autobiography. Apple Valley, CA: Bronze-Lyric Publishing Co.

== See also ==
- Bihari brothers, and Joe Bihari
- Dean Dixon
