= KOAD-LP =

Hanford, California; United States
- Broadcast area: Hanford, California; Lemoore, California; Kings County, California
- Frequency: 92.5 MHz

Ownership
- Owner: Denise M. White; (Hanford Youth Services, Inc.)

History
- First air date: February 9, 2015
- Last air date: December 30, 2020

Technical information
- Facility ID: 196317
- Class: L1
- ERP: 100 watts
- HAAT: 24.4 meters (80 ft)
- Transmitter coordinates: 36°19′36.4″N 119°38′46.0″W

KOAD-LP was a classic rock formatted broadcast radio station. The station was licensed to Hanford, California and serving Hanford, Lemoore, and Kings County in California. KOAD-LP was owned by Denise M. White and operated under the Hanford Youth Services, Inc.

== History ==
Leroy Hurte became the radio manager of KOAD radio station in 1968; and from 1968 to 1971 he owned it.

Denise M. White and Hanford Youth Services, Inc. applied for the construction permit to begin the process of building what would become KOAD on November 12, 2013. The station received a License to Cover, allowing it to begin broadcasting, from the Federal Communications Commission (FCC) on November 13, 2014.

KOAD-LP signed-on for the first time on February 9, 2015 with a classic rock format. This would bring English-language radio back to Kings County after 20 years. After signing on, local entertainment promotion personality Joey Perez was hired by KOAD-LP for their morning show. By 2016, plans were in place to regionally syndicate the morning show. Other programming included a live, weekly sports show from a Buffalo Wild Wings location in Hanford.

The station made regional headlines in 2018 when a photo, taken by morning show host Joey Perez, of Tom Cruise shooting scenes for Top Gun: Maverick at nearby Naval Air Station Lemoore. Hanford Youth Services received the donation of KNBI in Monterey, California, and per FCC rules, had to request the cancellation of KOAD-LP's license on December 3, 2020. KOAD-LP ceased broadcast operations, but continued to operate over internet radio until April 2022, when the stream was flipped to KMBY Monterey.

== Translator ==
In addition to KOAD-LP's primary frequency, the station's programming was simulcast on the following translator station to widen KOAD-LP's broadcast area.

Broadcast translator for KOAD-LP
Call sign	Frequency	City of license	FID	ERP (W)	HAAT	Class	Transmitter coordinates	FCC info
K272GD	102.3 FM	Fresno, California	144742	75	96 m (315 ft)	D	36°47′55.8″N 119°47′27.5″W	LMS
