= WASG (AM) =

- Daphne, Alabama; United States
- Broadcast area: Mobile, Alabama
- Frequency: 540 kHz

Programming
- Format: Urban gospel

Ownership
- Owner: Alabama Radio Corporation

History
- First air date: 1981

Technical information
- Licensing authority: FCC
- Facility ID: 51141
- Class: D
- Power: 2,500 watts (day); 19 watts (night)
- Transmitter coordinates: 30°44′45.7″N 88°5′39″W
- Translator: 106.1 W291CY (Mobile)

Links
- Public license information: Public file; LMS
- Webcast: WASG 540 Listen live
- Website: www.wilkinsradio.com/our-stations/wasg-540am-106-1fm-mobile-al

WASG (540 AM) is a radio station licensed to Daphne, Alabama, United States, broadcasting an urban gospel format.

The station was assigned the WASG call letters by the FCC on January 5, 1981.

In the fall of 2016, the station began to be heard on FM translator W291CY on 106.1 MHz.
