= KKAR =

- Beverly Hills, California; United States
- Broadcast area: Los Angeles County; Greater Los Angeles; Southern California
- Frequency: 1260 kHz (HD Radio)
- Branding: K-Mozart

Programming
- Format: Classical

Ownership
- Owner: Mount Wilson FM Broadcasters
- Sister stations: KKGO-FM

History
- First air date: October 19, 1947
- Former call signs: KGIL (1947–1993); KJQI (1993–1995); KNNS (1995–1997); KGIL (1997–2000); KJAZ (2000–2002); KSUR (2002–2005); KKGO (2005–2007); KMZT (2007); KGIL (2007–2011); KMZT (2011–2016); KBOQ (2016–2017); KSUR (2017–2020); KMZT (2020–2024); KKGO (2024–2025); KMZT (2025–2026)
- Call sign meaning: Car

Technical information
- Licensing authority: FCC
- Facility ID: 43937
- Class: B
- Power: 20,000 watts (day); 7,500 watts (night)
- Transmitter coordinates: 34°14′57″N 118°27′17.3″W
- Translator: 98.3 K252FO (Los Angeles)
- Repeater: 105.1 KKGO-FM HD2 (Los Angeles)

Links
- Public license information: Public file; LMS
- Webcast: Listen live
- Website: www.kmozart.com

KKAR (1260 kHz) is a commercial AM radio station licensed to Beverly Hills, California. Owned by Mount Wilson FM Broadcasters, the station serves Greater Los Angeles and much of surrounding Southern California. The KKAR studios are located in Los Angeles' Westwood neighborhood, while the station transmitter resides in the nearby Mission Hills neighborhood. Besides a standard analog transmission, KKAR broadcasts over through the HD Radio in-band on-channel standard for AM stations.

The station went on the air in 1947 as KGIL. It has undergone numerous call sign changes since 1993, including two restorations of the KGIL call sign and multiple periods as KSUR, KKGO, and KMZT; it has also frequently changed its format, including multiple stints with adult standards, oldies, talk, and (as "K-Mozart") classical music formats, as well as serving as the original home of KKGO-FM's country music format from 2006 to 2007.

== Station history ==
KGIL began broadcasting October 19, 1947, on 1260 kHz with 1,000 watts of power full-time. The station was licensed to San Fernando Valley Broadcasting Company, with studios and executive offices at 4919 Van Nuys Boulevard, Sherman Oaks, California.

At that time, it aired a big band music format. KGIL aired other formats including talk until 1993.

From 1993 to 1995, it had the call sign KJQI, playing adult standards music. In 1995, it became KNNS ("K-NEWS"), simulcasting with XETIN in Tijuana and now-defunct KNNZ in Costa Mesa, California. K-NEWS was an all-news radio service with content from the Associated Press or local announcers Peter Arbogast, Jim Roope, and H.K. Malay. K-NEWS was also the home of the Los Angeles Clippers and had an unprecedented eight traffic reports an hour, causing competitors KNX and KFWB to add more traffic reports to their schedules. On January 3, 1997, the station reverted to the KGIL call sign and aired an all-Beatles format until August 31. On September 1, 1997, the station switched to a format of Broadway show tunes. In July 1998, the station switched to Music of Your Life. In 2000, KGIL adopted a mainstream jazz format and changed its call sign to KJAZ. Then, in 2002, it took on the call sign KSUR and began broadcasting an adult standards format, changing to KKGO in 2005. From August 2004 to June 2005 the station had a 1950s-1960s oldies format.

On December 1, 2006, KKGO changed to a country music format, filling the void left behind when KZLA became rhythmic adult contemporary as KMVN earlier in 2006. On February 26, 2007, KKGO swapped call signs and formats with FM sister station KMZT, moving the country music format to 105.1 FM, and the classical format known as "K-Mozart" to 1260 AM and to a new HD channel at 105.1 HD2. On October 29, 2007, KMZT changed its calls back to KGIL and flipped formats from classical to talk radio, with Michael Jackson as the headline host. Jackson was laid off from the station about a year later and replaced by John Ziegler, who left after a few months. Aside from Jackson and Ziegler, the bulk of KGIL's programming was syndicated, mostly of second-tier programs left over from what KFI, KRLA and KABC did not want.

On November 27, 2007, KGIL started simulcasting on XESURF (540 AM) (the former XETIN), which flipped from classic country music.

Owner Saul Levine decided to return KGIL to a music format after the debut of a similar talk radio format on KFWB, which took place in September 2009. On August 27, 2009, the station switched to a mix of oldies and adult standards as "Retro 1260". Mornings had John Regan, middays had Gary Hollis, afternoons had Kimber Murphy, followed by Chuck Southcott, who had worked at KGIL from 1962 to 1975. "Retro 1260" emphasized vocals and played Elvis Presley, Sam Cooke, The Beatles, and The Beach Boys, as well as Frank Sinatra, Ella Fitzgerald, Steve Tyrell, and Michael Feinstein. In addition to music, KGIL was the Los Angeles-area affiliate for California Golden Bears football and aired games of the Los Angeles Clippers and Los Angeles Kings that conflicted with other events on their normal flagship stations.

On March 28, 2011, the Los Angeles Times reported that the station would begin airing classical music on April 4. The final song on "Retro 1260" was "How Sweet It Is (To Be Loved by You)" by Keely Smith at 11:58 p.m. on April 3, 2011. "Retro 1260" would soon be relaunched as an internet stream at Retro105.com and on KKGO's HD3 subchannel. KMZT's classical music format was also heard on a sister station in Big Sur, California, KMZT-FM 95.9.

On August 19, 2016, KMZT switched to an adult standards format and rebranded as "Unforgettable 1260", duplicating the format and branding of sister station KNRY (1240 AM) in Monterey. On September 7, 2016, KMZT changed its call sign to KBOQ. This call sign previously belonged to a classic hits station owned by Saul Levine in Monterey, which had become KDFG after he sold it to the University of Southern California.

On March 17, 2017, KBOQ flipped to oldies as "LA Oldies K-SURF". On March 20, 2017, the station changed its call sign to KSUR.

In July 2020, the "K-Mozart" classical music format returned on KKGO-HD4. On November 21, 2020, KSUR and KKGO-HD2 switched to full-time Christmas music. Subsequently, station management announced that it would return to a classical music format on December 1, with the oldies format remaining on KKGO-HD2. The station also changed back to its former KMZT call sign on December 1.

On September 6, 2024, KMZT again dropped "K-Mozart" (which continued on KKGO-HD2 and HD3, as well as Los Angeles FM translator 98.3 K252FO) and began stunting with all-Taylor Swift music. On September 27, the station switched to a loop of "Gone Country" by Alan Jackson, before relaunching as classic country Go Country Gold on October 2 as a companion to KKGO-FM. On April 29, 2025, KKGO AM resumed simulcasting the "K-Mozart" programming of KKGO-FM HD2 ahead of a return to the KMZT call sign; "Go Country Gold" remained on KKGO-FM HD4.

On September 29, 2026, Mount Wilson FM Broadcasters filed an application with the Federal Communications Commission to change the station's call letters to KKAR, effective October 30, 2026. On that date, KMZT changed its call letters to KKAR and switched to 1950s-60s-70s oldies as "K-Kar 1260." On November 9, 2026, the classical format returned to 1260 AM and the online stream switched to a simulcast of 105.1 KKGO-HD3, which is playing Christmas music through New Year's Day 2027. News reports identified the format change as being due to technical difficulties (Levine mentioned "vandalism at the transmitter site") and that the oldies format, which continues to be carried online, could potentially return in 2027.
