= KKGO-FM =

Country music radio station in Los Angeles

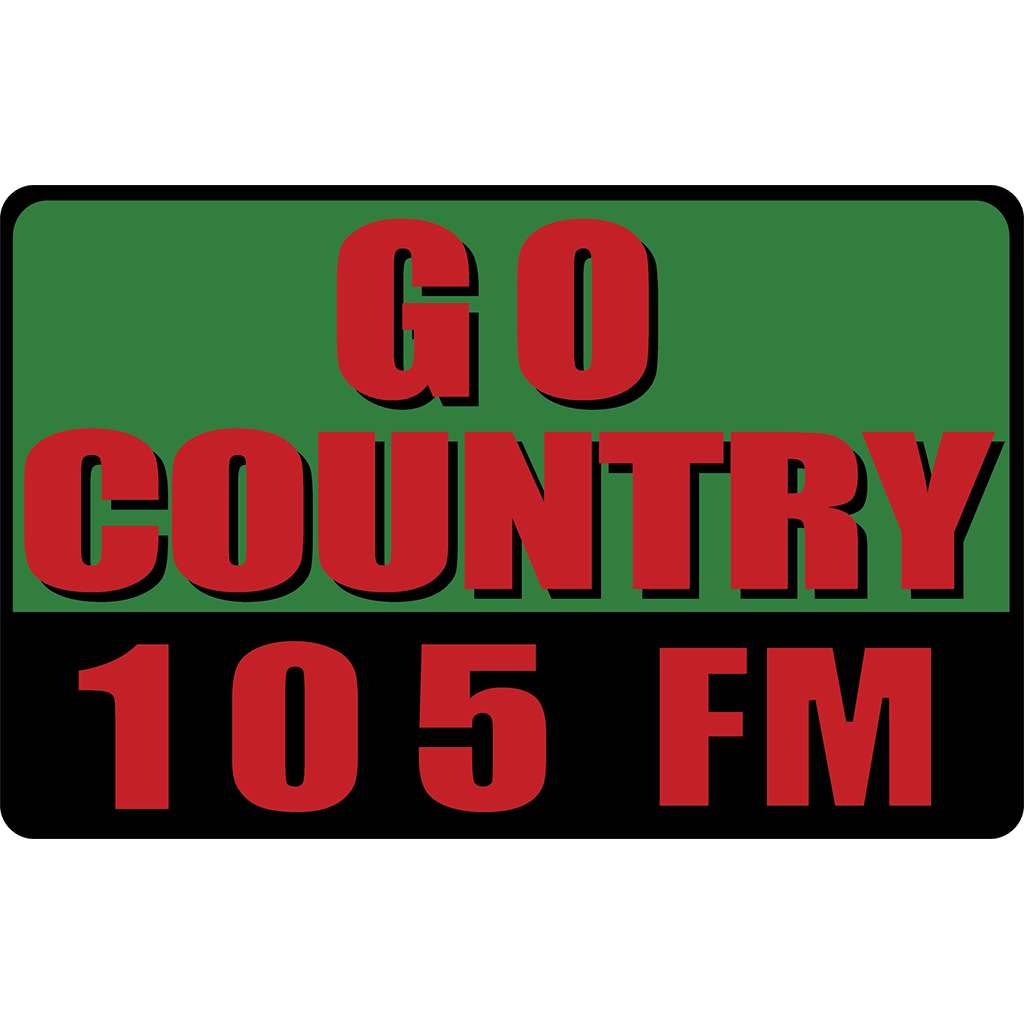
- Los Angeles, California; United States
- Broadcast area: Greater Los Angeles
- Frequency: 105.1 MHz (HD Radio)
- Branding: Go Country 105

Programming
- Format: Country
- Subchannels: HD2: Classical (KKAR); HD3: KKAR Oldies (Oldies); HD4: "The Surf" Smooth jazz

Ownership
- Owner: Mount Wilson FM Broadcasters
- Sister stations: KKAR

History
- First air date: February 18, 1959
- Former call signs: KDBX (1956–1958); KBCA (1958–1979); KKGO (1978–1988); KKGO-FM (1988–2000); KMZT-FM (2000–2007); KKGO (2007-2024)
- Call sign meaning: The word "GO"

Technical information
- Licensing authority: FCC
- Facility ID: 43939
- Class: B
- ERP: 18,000 watts
- HAAT: 880 meters (2,890 ft)
- Transmitter coordinates: 34.229°N 118.069°W

Links
- Public license information: Public file; LMS
- Webcast: Listen live; HD2: Listen live; HD3: Listen live; HD4: Listen live
- Website: gocountry105.com; HD2: kmozart.com; HD3: kkaroldies com; HD4: ksurf.org

KKGO-FM (105.1 FM, "Go Country 105") is a commercial radio station licensed to Los Angeles, California, United States. It is owned by Mount Wilson FM Broadcasters and airs a country music format. The studios are on Cotner Avenue at Ohio Avenue in Los Angeles' Westwood neighborhood, while the transmitter is atop Mount Wilson. Besides a standard analog transmission, KKGO-FM broadcasts four HD Radio channels and is available online.

KKGO-FM is notable in being the lone remaining full-power commercial FM signal licensed to Los Angeles that is still independently owned and operated.

== History ==
=== Jazz (1959–1989) ===
Saul Levine launched the station at 105.1 FM in February 1959 as KBCA, one of the first FM stations to broadcast from Mount Wilson. In 1979, the station changed its call sign to KKGO. This was prompted by a court challenge from KABC, according to one local podcaster. In 1988 the call sign was modified to KKGO-FM. The format was aired until 1989.

=== Classical (1989–2007) ===
After Evergreen Media's record-setting purchase of KFAC-FM (92.3 FM) on January 15, 1989, followed by rumors and publicity stunts suggesting that station music format (one which had its roots in KFAC (1330 AM), itself divested prior to Evergreen's purchase of the FM), KKGO announced that it would flip to classical effective January 1, 1990, with the jazz format being transferred to 540 AM.

Mount Wilson FM Broadcasters chairman Saul Levine made an initial bid for KFAC's music library, one which dated back to the 1940s, but withdrew his bid when presented with an asking price upwards of $1 million; a combination of KUSC, the Los Angeles Public Library, and Stanford University acquired it instead. In the time between KFAC-FM's switch on September 20, 1989, and KKGO's switch the following January 1, KKGO offered classical programming for part of the day, with former KFAC host John Santana hired as a part-time announcer.

KKGO celebrated the complete conversion to classical by playing selections from Franz Lehár's operetta The Land of Smiles. Another KFAC programming staple would be revived on KKGO that March: the Gas Company Evening Concert, which ran on KFAC and KFAC-FM between 1940 and 1989; former KFAC announcer Tom Dixon was hired as host of the new program's incarnation.

In 2000, the call letters were changed to KMZT-FM to reflect on their rebranding as "K-Mozart". The KKGO call letters were then moved to the co-owned station at 1260 AM.

=== Country (2007–present) ===
When longtime country music station KZLA (93.9 FM) flipped formats in August 2006, it left the two largest media markets in the United States and three of the top four without a full-time country music station. The New York City market had been without a country station following the format change of WYNY and three repeaters in 2003, while the San Francisco Bay Area was without one following KZBR's 2005 format change. The other top-three market, Chicago, is served by WUSN.

On February 26, 2007, at 5:00 a.m., in a surprise move announced only three days earlier, Mount Wilson Broadcasters flipped KKGO from K-Mozart to country as "Go Country 105". The company cited declining advertising revenues for the classical format. Saul Levine swapped the formats of 105.1 FM with 1260 AM, bringing the country format and the KKGO calls back to FM while moving the classical programming and the KMZT calls to the AM signal. (XESURF-AM continued to play country music, first simulcasting KKGO's format, but later splitting its programming from that of KKGO). After playing Mozart's "String Quartet no. 23 in F major, K. 590", Los Angeles was left once again without a commercial analog FM classical music station.

KKGO brought country music back to the FM dial after a six-month absence, much to the delight of Southern California country fans who had spent that time petitioning the radio community to restore country radio in Los Angeles. Such activities included writing letters, making phone calls, wearing "I Want My Country Music Back" shirts, and distributing ribbons reading "Save Country Music". Their goal was to assure broadcasters and others that the country music format would be a valuable asset to a local radio station. The first song on Go Country 105 was "Only in America" by Brooks & Dunn.

K-Mozart returned to KKGO on April 4, 2011, this time on the HD2 subchannel. As of March 2017, K-Mozart is heard on KKGO-HD4 while KKGO-HD2 airs an oldies format.

On May 8, 2013, KKGO began limiting access to the online stream of Go Country 105 to listeners in California due to rising royalty rates from the exponential growth of the streaming audience. KKGO's sister stations and HD subchannels did not restrict their respective streams. As of 2015, this restriction has been lifted; access to the stream is available throughout the United States via the KKGO website as well as through iHeartRadio.

Until 2015, KKGO was simulcast on KGIL in Johannesburg, California, extending Go Country 105's reach into the Mojave Desert. The simulcast ended after Mount Wilson's sale of KGIL to Adelman Broadcasting closed.

In addition to its K-Mozart AM sister stations, KKGO also had an AM radio station on 540 AM.

=== Christmas music ===
On November 15, 2016, KKGO began an annual tradition of airing Christmas music for part of November and December, rebranding itself as "105.1 Your Christmas Destination". With this move, the station competed directly with ratings-leader KOST 103.5 FM, which also switches to an all-Christmas format. During this time, KKGO's regular, non-seasonal country music remained available on one of the station's HD channels and online. The station reverted to its basic country format on December 26, 2016. It continued switching to Christmas music in November and December for nearly a decade.

KKGO often had notable musical artists host Christmas programming. Guests included Jordan Davis, Dan + Shay, Chris Young, Mitchell Tenpenny, Carrie Underwood, Idina Menzel, and Martina McBride.

In October 2024, KKGO-HD2 and its FM translator on 98.3 MHz ("K-Mozart") temporarily dropped its classical format and began airing Christmas music through December 31. Conversely KKGO-FM's main channel continued with its regular country format during the 2024 holiday season for the first time since 2015.

== HD Radio ==
=== Digital subchannels ===
The station began broadcasting an HD Radio digital signal in 2005. As of 2026, KKGO-FM broadcasts on four subchannels:

- KKGO-FM HD1 is a digital simulcast of the analog signal.
- KKGO-FM HD2 carries a Classical music format branded as "K-Mozart" as a simulcast of KKAR (1260 AM). This HD2 subchannel feeds FM translator K252FO at 98.3 MHz.
- KKGO-FM HD3 airs a Christmas music format branded as "KKAR Oldies"
- KKGO-FM HD4 airs a smooth jazz format branded as "The Surf."

=== Unforgettable ===
In 2005, Mount Wilson Broadcasting started simulcasting the programming of two of its AM stations at the time, KKGO 1260 in Beverly Hills, California, and XESURF-AM 540 in the Tijuana—San Diego border area, on KMZT-FM's HD2 signal. It began airing an adult standards format known as "Unforgettable 540 & 1260". While the AM signals combined to cover much of the Southern California region, they were still weak, especially at night in Orange County; the FM HD2 simulcast helped boost the reach of the format.

In March 2015, the HD3 subchannel became Unforgettable FM, flipping from classic country. Songs representative of this adult standards format, collectively referred to as the "Great American Songbook", come from such artists as Tony Bennett, Nat "King" Cole, Barbra Streisand, Harry Connick, Jr., Mel Tormé, Rosemary Clooney, Dean Martin, Andy Williams, Frank Sinatra and Michael Bublé. This took the subchannel back to a format similar to the one it aired a few years prior under the banner of "Retro 105". However, Retro 105 was only heard in Los Angeles whereas Unforgettable was classified as syndicated and was heard on KNRY in Monterey, California, as well. Later, Unforgettable moved to KKGO's HD4 subchannel. Unforgettable would be dropped altogether, but brought back later.

On July 28, 2023, KKGO HD3 temporarily dropped the "Unforgettable" standards format and switched to an all-Taylor Swift format in anticipation of her Eras Tour shows in Los Angeles. KKGO HD3 switched to classical music as K-Mozart2 in April 2024 and aired an oldies format, branded as "K-Surf," in 2025. On January 1, 2026, KKGO HD3 switched to an all-Beatles format as "K-Beatle." On March 4, 2026, KKGO HD3 switched to classical music as K-Mozart+. On May 8, 2026, KKGO HD3 began stunting with a loop of Gene Autry's "Back in the Saddle Again" and promos announcing "Something big is coming to KKGO 105.1 HD3." On June 8, 2026, KKGO 105.1 HD3 begin playing smooth jazz. On June 10, 2026, the loop of "Back in the Saddle Again" returned. On July 15, 2026, KKGO 105.1 HD3 switched to 1970s-'80s-'90s-2000s classic country as "Big Country." On July 16, 2026, KKGO 105.1 HD3 began playing a loop of California-themed songs including Scott McKenzie's "San Francisco", Dionne Warwick's "Do You Know the Way to San Jose", America's "Ventura Highway" and the Eagles' "Hotel California". On August 21, 2026, KKGO 105.1 HD3 rebranded as "America's Christmas Station" and will play Christmas music through New Year's Day. On October 30, 2026, its sister station KMZT AM changed its call letters to KKAR switched to 1950s-60s-70s oldies as "K-Kar 1260." On November 9, 2026, KKAR switched to a simulcast of KKGO HD3.

== General references ==
- Countryboards.com — Country music message board set up as a command center for fans to get country music back on FM radio after losing KZLA
- Fybush, Scott (May 23, 2007). "Levine's KKGO/KMZT Embrace HD Radio". Radio World.
