= KDFH =

Radio station in Big Sur, California (2012–2017)

- Big Sur, California; United States
- Frequency: 95.9 MHz

Programming
- Format: Defunct (was Classical)

History
- First air date: 2012
- Last air date: August 1, 2017
- Former call signs: KMZT-FM (2012–2013, 2014–2016); KYZZ (2013–2014)

Technical information
- Facility ID: 183343
- Class: A
- ERP: 1,000 watts
- HAAT: 251 meters (823 ft)
- Transmitter coordinates: 36°13′24″N 121°45′27″W

KDFH (95.9 FM) was a radio station licensed to Big Sur, California, United States. The station served the Monterey and Santa Cruz areas.

== History ==
In June 2016, Mount Wilson Broadcasting donated KMZT-FM's 95.9 frequency to the University of Southern California. The 95.9 frequency would become part of USC's classical music radio network. Mount Wilson FM Broadcasting retained the KMZT-FM call letters. On August 26, 2016, KMZT-FM changed their call letters to KDFH and on August 31, 2016, it switched to a simulcast of KDFC in San Francisco.

At the licensee's request, KDFH's license was cancelled on August 1, 2017.
