= Mount Wilson FM Broadcasters =

Radio broadcasting company in California, United States

Mount Wilson FM Broadcasters, Inc., a subsidiary of Mt. Wilson Broadcasting Inc., is a Los Angeles-based radio broadcasting company owned by Saul Levine. The company was founded in 1959, and Levine is the only independent operator of an FM commercial radio station in Los Angeles, that being KKGO-FM, today.

== Stations ==
Mount Wilson owns the following radio stations:

Los Angeles

- KKGO-FM Go Country 105— 105.1 FM — Country music
- KKAR (AM)- Rockin' Around The Clock— 1260 AM — Oldies music Coordinates: 34.249167°N -118.453889°W

== History ==
Levine established KKGO-FM in 1959 (originally KBCA) on limited funds, helped greatly by the fact that he was able to buy a used FM transmitter for $1,500 from a Michigan station which had gone off the air. The station's original antenna was built in a garage for $300. Initially, KKGO was a classical station and the first broadcast was a selection from Franz Lehár's Land of Smiles. But the station was unable to compete for advertising.

As a result, it changed to an all-jazz format and remained jazz until 1989 when it switched back to classical as a result of KFAC and KFAC-FM changing its format. KBCA was one of Los Angeles' main jazz stations, with shows hosted by disc jockeys Rick Holmes (also a Grammy nominated spoken word recording artist), Jim Gosa, Chuck Niles, Jai Rich, Dennis Smith and Richard Leos, who handled a pioneering Latin jazz show in the evenings. In 1969, KBCA tested jazz performers as hosts, including weekly shows for Gerald Wilson and Calvin Jackson.

In 1969, KBCA hosted a "jazzmobile" series of free concerts around the city, with a flatbed truck setting up in shopping centers and city parks, to expose listeners in the Central Los Angeles area and around colleges to jazz. Jimmy Witherspoon appeared on the first jazzmobile free concert.

In 2007, KKGO adopted a country music format due to declining revenues.
