= Scott Mason (radio personality) =

American radio personality

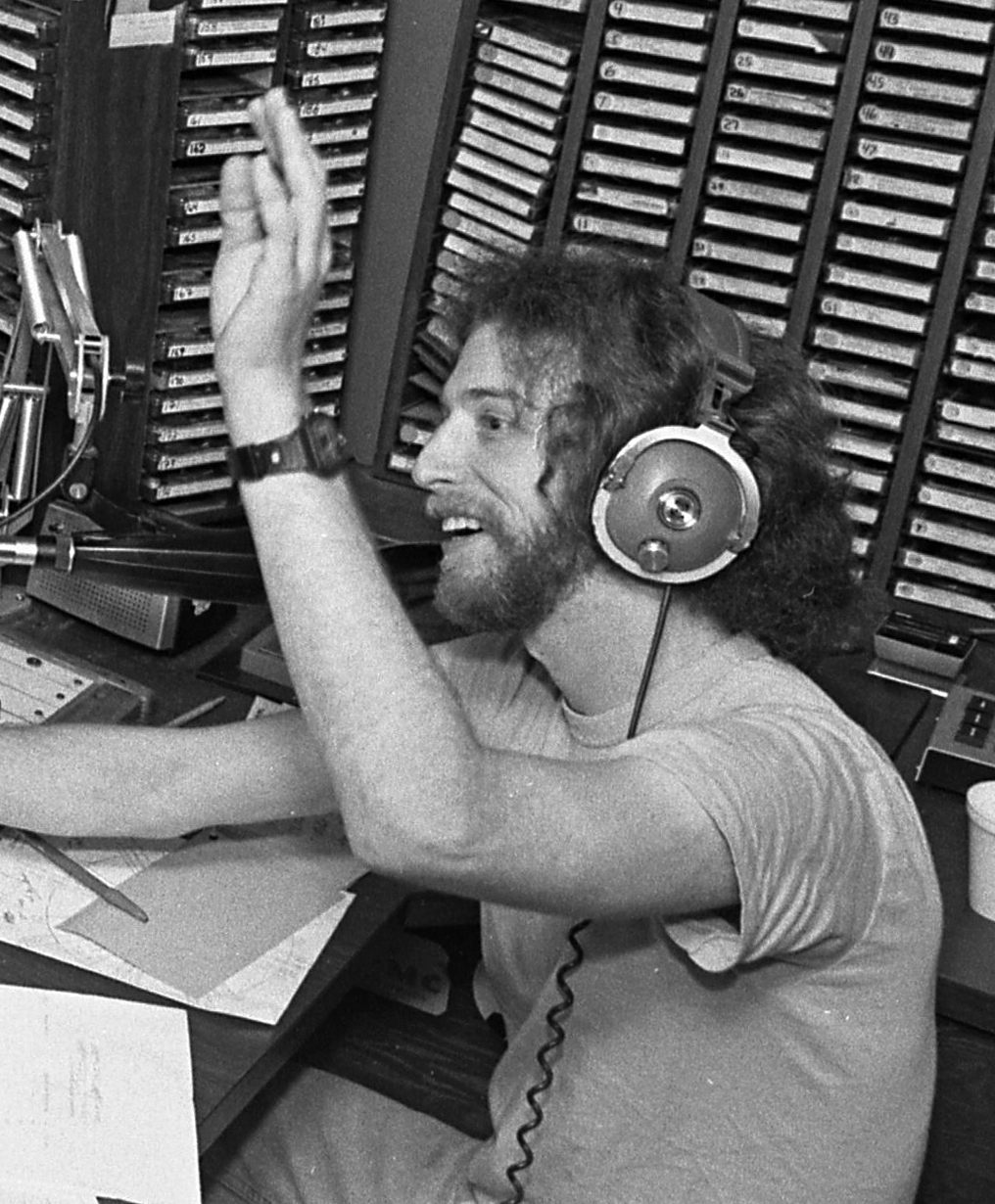
- Mason in 1985
- Born: Scott Cary Mason; September 26, 1959
- Died: April 19, 2015 (aged 55)
- Education: CSUN
- Occupation: Radio personality

Scott Cary Mason (September 26, 1959 – April 19, 2015) was an American radio personality, executive and engineer who worked at Los Angeles radio stations KKDJ, KIQQ, KGBS/KTNQ, and KROQ-FM. Mason suffered from kidney problems for most of his adult life and received two kidney transplants prior to his death in 2015 at the age of 55.

== Life and career ==
Born in New York and raised in southern California, Mason studied at LA Valley College and later at California State University at Northridge. He began his career in radio at the age of 14 in Los Angeles, answering phones for program director Rick Carroll at 102.7 KKDJ. At age 15, he acquired his third-class, broadcast-endorsed FCC operator's license. When Carroll and most of the KKDJ staff were released, Mason moved to KIQQ "K-100", where he was a board operator.

In 1976 Mason moved to a new LA radio station, KTNQ "Ten-Q", where he was an entry-level engineer who answered request lines. Ten-Q had a country FM sister station, KGBS, where Mason DJ'd on weekends. Mason also worked at KKOK/KBIK in Lompoc on weekends during this time. He remained at Ten-Q and KGBS until 1979, when it was sold just prior to switching to Spanish-language programming.

In May 1979, Rick Carroll was hired to run KROQ-FM. Carroll hired Mason as a weekend DJ and chief engineer, even though he was still a teenager. Since that time, Scott would go on to work every air shift on KROQ-FM at one time or another. Scott was an original host of Loveline with The Poorman and Dr. Drew.

One Saturday afternoon in 1980, Mason called himself Spacin' Scott Mason on the air. He immediately received a call on the hotline from Carroll, who told him to continue to use Spacin' Scott Mason as his radio name.

In 1999, Infinity Broadcasting CFO Farid Suleman put Mason on the company's Y2K team. That team eventually became the CBS Radio regional engineering team, and Mason was appointed regional director of engineering for the West Coast, ultimately overseeing operations of 45 stations. Mason was also accountable for oversight of CBS Radio's construction projects for Wilshire Broadcast Center on the Miracle Mile and the Venice Studios. Concurrent with his engineering work, Mason also maintained his on-air shift at KROQ up to the time of his death in 2015 and was active in the Society of Broadcast Engineers (SBE).

For nearly twenty years, Mason hosted "OpenLine", KROQ-FM's Sunday morning public affairs program. By 2008, the program was being heard In 2006, the show also aired on KCBS-FM /JACK-FM. In 2008, the show was broadcast in Los Angeles on K-Earth 101 (renamed "The Forum" for K-Earth broadcasts) and on 94.7 The Wave KTWV.

Mason suffered from kidney disease throughout his adult life. He received a kidney transplant in 1999 followed by a second transplant in 2012 — this one from personal friend and KROQ DJ Gene "Bean" Baxter, since he was very far down on the transplant recipient list — but died on April 19, 2015.

== Other interests ==
In addition to his involvement with SBE, Mason was a scuba diving instructor, taught broadcasting at Los Angeles Valley College, was a volunteer EMT, and also volunteered with the Boy Scouts.

Preceded by —	Co-Host of Loveline; 1983 – 1987	Succeeded by Riki Rachtman
