= KPCC (FM) =

Public radio station in Pasadena, California

- Pasadena, California; United States
- Broadcast area: Greater Los Angeles
- Frequency: 89.3 MHz (HD Radio)
- Branding: LAist 89.3

Programming
- Language: English
- Format: Public radio; All-news radio
- Subchannels: HD2: KCMP simulcast (Adult album alternative)
- Affiliations: American Public Media; NPR; Public Radio Exchange

Ownership
- Owner: Pasadena City College; (Pasadena Area Community College District)
- Operator: Southern California Public Radio (American Public Media Group)

History
- First air date: August 2, 1957
- Former call signs: KPCS (1957–1979)
- Call sign meaning: Pasadena City College

Technical information
- Licensing authority: FCC
- Facility ID: 51701
- Class: B
- ERP: 600 watts
- HAAT: 891 meters (2,923 ft)
- Transmitter coordinates: 34°13′36″N 118°03′58″W
- Translator: See § Translators and boosters
- Repeater: See § Repeaters

Links
- Public license information: Public file; LMS
- Webcast: Listen live
- Website: laist.com

KPCC (FM 89.3) – branded LAist 89.3 – is a non-commercial educational radio station licensed in Pasadena, California. KPCC itself primarily serves Greater Los Angeles and the San Fernando Valley; through rebroadcasting and translator stations, KPCC's programming also reaches the Santa Barbara, Coachella Valley, Palm Springs, and Ventura County, California, areas, and part of the Inland Empire area. The station is owned by Pasadena City College and operated by the American Public Media Group's Southern California Public Radio (SCPR), in addition to serving as an affiliate for National Public Radio and Public Radio Exchange. It originates some of its own shows. The studios are located inside the Mohn Broadcast Center and Crawford Family Forum on South Raymond Street in Pasadena, and the station transmitter is on Mount Wilson.

As of 2023, SCPR served "more than 527,000 listeners each week". It is one of two full NPR members in the Los Angeles area; Santa Monica-based KCRW is the other.

== History ==
Pasadena City College has a history in radio back to when it was still Pasadena Junior College, a combined high school and college; in 1934 it began hosting a monthly radio show on the Pasadena Presbyterian Church station KPPC (AM). Pasadena City College's 75th anniversary history book mentions "an experimental program every Monday night in 1942 on KPCS" named "Presenting Pasadena for Pasadena Preferred", produced by the PCC Radio Division and the Chronicle.

Pasadena City College opened a radio studio on December 14, 1947, with a studio classroom, engineering room, work room, and reception room, and no transmitter or broadcast license; the studio instead continued to broadcast its programs over other local radio stations, such as KPPC and KXLA (AM). The college was also active in television from September 1949, using the Pasadena Playhouse, which had its own television department.

The college began its own broadcasts on FM in April 1957 as KPCS, with a transmitter purchased from KWKW. One of the few two-year college stations with an FCC broadcast license, it was originally on the air from 11 a.m. to 2 p.m., it went to "all day" broadcasting on October 1, 1962. The original call sign of KPCS stood for "Pasadena City Schools". The call sign was changed to KPCC at the end of 1971.

During the 1970s and 1980s the station won numerous broadcasting awards. The radio station and television studio were flooded in the 12-day rainstorm that affected Pasadena in 1983.

KPCC's transmitter and radio tower moved from the C Building at PCC to a higher-powered facility on Mount Wilson in 1988. In 1993, the studios also moved out of the C Building, where they had been confined to a cramped basement, and into the newly built Shatford Library with the television production studios and Media Center, where the radio studios remained until 2010. The station expansion, particularly in signal coverage area, led to years of controversy in the 1990s over the station's change in focus from Pasadena-area to Los Angeles regional interest. However, by the end of the 1990s, KPCC remained a small, student-operated National Public Radio station with various music programs and a budget of $300,000.

=== Southern California Public Radio ===
Around 1999 or 2000, Pasadena City College received an offer from Minnesota Public Radio for MPR to form a new branch, Southern California Public Radio (SCPR), to take over operation of KPCC, with PCC continuing to hold the official broadcast license. SCPR is a not-for-profit organization now controlled by American Public Media Group, parent organization of Minnesota Public Radio.

Under the operation of SCPR, the music and some of the local programming was replaced by network programming. Though there were still internship opportunities for students in technical roles, there were much fewer on-air voice opportunities. In response to this, PCC started an additional, 1 watt, radio station on 88.9 MHz in 1998, which became known as Lancer Radio, and had an Internet audio stream and a website by 2005.

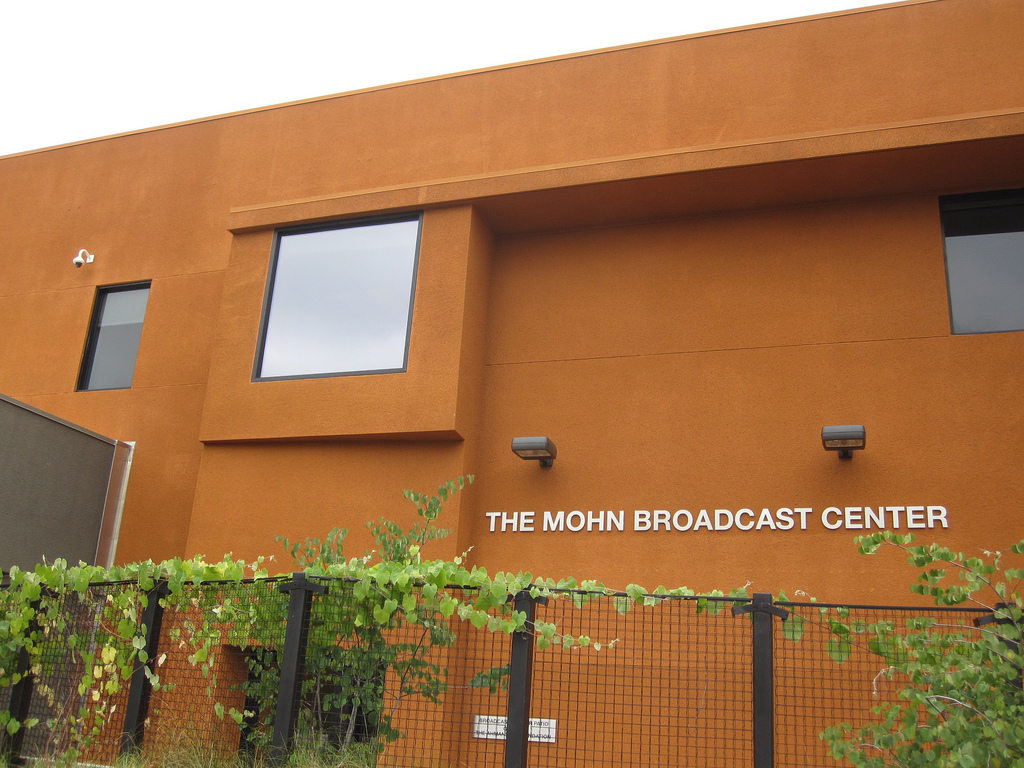
KPCC's Mohn Broadcast Center in June 2011

In March 2010, KPCC moved from the Shatford Library to a 35,000-square-foot (3,300 m^{2}) converted office building on Raymond Avenue in Pasadena, at a cost of $24.5 million, and named the new facilities the Mohn Broadcast Center and Crawford Family Forum.

In February 2018, SCPR, along with the operators of public radio stations WNYC in New York City and WAMU in Washington, D.C., acquired much of the assets of the blog Gothamist and its sister sites LAist and DCist, using donations from two anonymous donors, and with plans to merge LAist into SCPR's existing studio operations.

On January 31, 2023, SCPR announced that the radio stations would move away from using "KPCC" as a brand, and adopt the "LAist" name across all its platforms, including the radio stations. The official call letters for the Pasadena radio station remained KPCC after the re-brand.

== Programming ==
Broadcast programming originating at KPCC includes the L.A.-centric AirTalk and film-focused FilmWeek with Larry Mantle, The Loh Down on Science with Sandra Tsing Loh, and pop culture trivia show Go Fact Yourself with J. Keith van Straaten and Helen Hong. The stations also carry multiple public radio shows from National Public Radio (NPR), the Public Radio Exchange (PRX), and LAist/SCPR's sister organization American Public Media (APM). In 2025, LAist began a news partnership with commercial television stations KCBS-TV and KCAL-TV.

== See also ==
- Campus radio
- List of college radio stations in the United States
