= Loveline =

Call-in radio program

- Genre: Talk; Advice; Comedy
- Running time: Approximately 93 minutes (Two hours, including commercials)
- Country of origin: United States
- Home station: KROQ-FM (1983–2018, 2024–2025); Channel Q (2018–2022)
- TV adaptations: Loveline (1996–2000)
- Hosted by: Jim Trenton (1983–1993); Drew Pinsky (1984–2016); "Swedish" Egil Aalvik (1983–1990); Scott Mason (1983–1987); Lee "Harvey" Alpert (1986–1989); Riki Rachtman (1993–1996); Adam Carolla (1995–2005); Stryker (2006–2009); Michael Catherwood (2010–2016); Simone Bienne (2011–2012); Amber Rose (2016–2018); Chris Donaghue (2016–2022)
- Created by: Scott Mason; Jim Trenton
- Produced by: Ann Wilkins-Ingold
- Original release: 1983
- Website: lovelineshow.com

Loveline is a syndicated radio call-in program in North America that features medical and relationship advice, often with guest appearances by actors and musicians. For most of its original run until ending in 2016, the show was hosted by Drew Pinsky, who was paired with a radio personality. Several relaunches of the show with new hosts have occurred since that time. As of March 2025, new episodes of the show are no longer being produced.

At the height of its popularity, Loveline was also adapted into a weekly live television program on MTV, also titled Loveline. The television version was hosted by Pinsky, Adam Carolla, and a rotating third co-host.

== Format ==
Loveline follows a call-in, question-and-answer format, primarily aimed at helping youth and young adults with issues related to relationships, sexuality, and drug addiction. The program combines the medical expertise of Pinsky, an internist and addiction medicine specialist, with the perspective and humor of a comedic co-host. Adam Carolla described his role as a "sheep in wolf's clothing". Humor is often used to keep the tone approachable, even when discussing serious topics such as addiction, sexual abuse, and domestic violence.

The show occasionally addresses general medical questions, especially during slower segments or when the topics are atypical. Listeners are also invited to participate in various games featured on Loveline.

== History ==
=== Radio origins ===
Loveline began in 1983 as a Sunday night dating and relationships segment on Los Angeles radio station KROQ-FM, hosted by DJ Jim "Poorman" Trenton, DJ "Swedish" Egil Aalvik, and Scott Mason.

The show aired live Sundays through Thursdays from 10 p.m. to midnight PT (Mondays through Fridays from 1 to 3 a.m. ET). Its flagship station was KROQ-FM in Los Angeles. It was syndicated primarily on rock, alternative, and adult talk radio stations.

In 1984, Trenton introduced a segment called "Ask a Surgeon," hosted by his friend Drew Pinsky, then a fourth-year medical student at the University of Southern California. A prior legal segment had featured a lawyer known as "Lawyer Lee." As the show gained popularity, Pinsky emerged as a regular presence and became known informally as "Dr. Drew."

Mason departed following a breakup, and the legal and Swedish Egil segments were discontinued. Trenton continued with Pinsky as co-host. In February 1992, Loveline expanded to five nights a week. Trenton was replaced in August 1993 by former MTV VJ Riki Rachtman.

Adam Carolla joined the show in October 1995, coinciding with its national syndication. Carolla and Rachtman often competed for airtime, leading to Rachtman's departure in January 1996. Carolla and Pinsky remained co-hosts until Carolla's departure in November 2005.

During their decade-long partnership, the show's popularity grew significantly. Carolla's humor and Pinsky's medical expertise created a distinctive dynamic. Together, they refined the format, toured, hosted a television version on MTV from 1996 to 2000, co-wrote a book, and made cameo appearances across various media. Carolla left to launch The Adam Carolla Show in January 2006.

Following Carolla's departure, the show featured a rotation of celebrity guest hosts. Pinsky later revealed that the shortlist for a permanent co-host included Carson Daly, Joel McHale, Danny Bonaduce, Steve-O, and Daniel Tosh. On July 23, 2006, KROQ-FM DJ Stryker was named co-host.

Stryker left the show on April 22, 2009, citing budget cuts at Westwood One. Another round of guest hosts followed until Mike "Psycho Mike" Catherwood from The Kevin and Bean Show became permanent co-host on March 11, 2010.

Simone Bienne, who had guest-hosted extensively, was introduced as co-host in December 2011. Presented by Pinsky on Lifechangers, she became the show's first female co-host, but departed in November 2012.

On December 7, 2012, Carolla and Pinsky launched a "Reunion Tour" to promote their podcast, The Adam & Dr. Drew Show.

On January 5, 2015, Catherwood and Pinsky launched Dr. Drew Midday Live with Mike Catherwood on KABC in Los Angeles.

Catherwood announced his departure on March 16, 2016, to focus on family. His final episode aired March 31. On April 21, Dr. Drew confirmed that Loveline would end after the April 28 broadcast. Carolla returned for the final episode. The radio version concluded in April 2016.

=== Podcast ===
After a hiatus, the show returned on September 8, 2016, as a weekly podcast hosted by Amber Rose and sex therapist Chris Donaghue, with Ann Ingold as producer. The podcast ended on March 8, 2018.

=== Channel Q ===
On November 1, 2018, Loveline was revived on the LGBTQ network Channel Q, hosted by Dr. Chris Donaghue. It aired Monday through Thursday from 7 to 9 p.m. Eastern Time, broadcast via Audacy's streaming service and HD Radio subchannels in about 20 markets including New York City, Los Angeles, and Chicago. Although no cancellation was officially announced, new episodes ended in December 2022 before the show's next iteration began in 2024.

=== Brief KROQ Reboot - December 2024 to March 2025 ===
A third version launched on KROQ-FM on December 15, 2024, hosted by Kevan Kenney and Tara Suwinyattichaiporn, who holds a doctorate in human communication. The showed aired only on KROQ Sunday nights from 10pm to midnight. Amid layoffs at parent company Audacy, the show ended in March 2025 after 12 Sunday broadcasts.

== Personalities ==
=== Regular hosts ===
- Drew Pinsky (December 1984 – April 28, 2016)
- Jim "The Poorman" Trenton (1983 – August 1993)
- "Swedish" Egil Aalvik (1983–1990)
- Scott Mason (1983–1987)
- Attorney Lee "Harvey" Alpert (1986–1989)
- Riki Rachtman (August 1993 – January 17, 1996)
- Adam Carolla (October 1995 – November 3, 2005)
- Stryker (July 23, 2006 – April 22, 2009)
- Michael Catherwood (March 21, 2010 – March 31, 2016)
- Simone Bienne (December 6, 2011 – November 11, 2012)
- Amber Rose (September 8, 2016 – March 17, 2018)
- Chris Donaghue (November 1, 2018 – December 15, 2022)
- Kevan Kenney (December 15, 2024 – March 2025)
- Tara Suwinyattichaiporn aka "Dr. Tara" (December 15, 2024 – March 2025)

=== Recurring fill-ins ===
For Pinsky (in the case of medical physicians) or Psycho Mike (in the case of usual comedic co-host)

- Dr. Gary Alter: "Dr. Alter" ("Dr. Whack 'n' Sack, Dr. Alter-men")
- Nicole Alvarez: DJ on KROQ-FM
- David Alan Grier: a popular and frequent guest, sometimes referred to as the "Third Host" of Loveline or DAG.
- Dr. Ohad Ben-Yehuda: "Dr. Ben" (OB/GYN, Infertility, High Risk Obstetrics)
- Dr. Marcel Daniels: "Dr. Marcel"
- Dr. Bruce Heischober: "Dr. Bruce" (Ichabod Bruce, Dr. Spaz)
- Dr. Bruce Hensel: "Dr. Bruce"
- Dr. Reef Karim: "Dr. Reef"
- Dr. Robert Rey: "Dr. 90210", a plastic surgeon from Beverly Hills
- Trina Dolenz: former host of VH1's Tool Academy and couples therapist
- Emily Morse: "Sex with Emily"

=== Producers ===
- Ann Wilkins-Ingold (1988 – April 28, 2016)
- Lauren (Junior Producer) (2002 – December 20, 2007)
- Jonathan "Beer Mug" Kantrowe (December 2024 to March 2025)

=== Radio engineers ===
The show has had many engineers throughout the years who have developed their own on-air presence. Whether it be conversations with hosts and guests or specific "radio drops" that they have produced usually from clips of previous shows.

- Mike Dooley (October 1995 – June 20, 1999) ("Dooley," "The One-Nut Wonder," produced "The Drew Shuffle" and "The Drew Boogie")
- Anderson Cowan (June 21, 1999 – April 28, 2016) ("The Magic Fingered One," "The Liberace of the Potentiometers," produced "Millionaire", PAB, Co-Host of "The After Disaster")
- Damion Stephens (2000–2002)
- Chris Perez (2003–2005)
- Michelle (2004 – November 2005) (left for The Adam Carolla Show)

Timeline

== Media tie-ins and cultural influence ==
A TV version of Loveline, also titled Loveline, aired on MTV from 1996 to 2000 and was produced by Stone Stanley Entertainment. It followed a similar format to the radio program but featured a live audience and a rotating female co-host alongside Pinsky and Carolla. The co-host role was filled during the show's run by MTV VJ Idalis, actresses Kris McGaha, Catherine McCord, Diane Farr, and comedian Laura Kightlinger. The show was filmed at Hollywood Center Studios.

The Dr. Drew and Adam Book: A Survival Guide to Life and Love, an advice book written in a tone similar to the radio program, was released in 1998.

The series also inspired several games mentioned on the show.

A thinly veiled reference to Loveline appears in the 1988 film Heathers in a scene featuring a fictional radio call-in show titled Hot Probs, hosted by Jim Trenton, the then-host of Loveline.
