= Dusty Street =

American radio personality

- Born: October 19, 1946; Palo Alto, California, U.S.
- Died: October 21, 2023 (age 77); Eugene, Oregon, U.S.
- Occupations: Disc jockey, radio host

Dustine "Dusty" Frances Street (October 19, 1946 – October 21, 2023) was an American disc jockey. As one of the first women to work on-air in FM radio on the West Coast, she was associated with station KROQ in Los Angeles in the 1980s, and was inducted into the Bay Area Radio Hall of Fame in 2015.

== Early life and education ==
Street was born in Palo Alto, California, the daughter of Emerson Street, a journalist and labor organizer, and Mildred Ruth Sutherland Street, a journalist. She graduated from Cubberley High School in 1964; she attended but did not graduate from San Francisco State College.

== Career ==
Street began her radio career in San Francisco, where she worked with Tom Donahue at KMPX in the late 1960s and at KSAN from 1969 to 1979. She worked at KROQ in Los Angeles from 1979 to 1989, with a year away at other stations in the city. She was credited with being one of the first women DJs on West Coast radio and with introducing several major artists and genres to American commercial radio, including Billy Idol and Siouxsie and the Banshees. "Nobody in the country was playing what we were playing when we started," she recalled, in an oral history interview about her time at KROQ, conducted by Liz Ohanesian in 2007. "It was all about the freedom. It was never about the money, it was never about the acclaim, it was all about the freedom." She was known for her sign-off slogan, "Fly low and avoid the radar."

From 2002 to 2022, Street hosted on Deep Tracks and Classic Vinyl, channels on SiriusXM, from her home in Cleveland. She and her longtime colleague Raechel Donahue were part of the Moonlight Groove Highway radio project of the Rock and Roll Hall of Fame in 2004, and part of NPR's Airplay documentary project in 2011. She also had a podcast, the Fly Low Show. In 2023, she appeared in the documentary San Francisco Sounds: A Place in Time. She was inducted into the Bay Area Radio Hall of Fame in 2015.

== Personal life ==
Street died in 2023, at the age of 77, in Eugene, Oregon.
