= List of people from Reston, Virginia =

The following is a list of notable individuals who were born in and/or have lived in Reston, Virginia.

== Arts and entertainment ==
- Donna Andrews, mystery fiction writer
- Aja Barber, author and fashion activist
- Big Pooh, MC in the hip hop group Little Brother; attended South Lakes High School
- Benny Blanco, born Benjamin Levin, songwriter and producer who has worked with artists such as Katy Perry, Britney Spears, and 3OH!3
- Roy Buchanan, guitarist and blues musician
- Matt Duke (born 1985), singer-songwriter/musician; signed to Rykodisc; has released multiple albums; born in Reston
- Aldn (born 2001), singer, songwriter and record producer.
- Jeremy Gelbwaks, child actor from The Partridge Family
- Evan Helmuth, actor (The Devil Inside, Fever Pitch, Jobs); raised in Reston
- Michael Hersch, composer and pianist
- Lubomir Kavalek, chess grandmaster
- George Taylor Morris, radio host who popularized the "Dark Side of the Rainbow" phenomenon
- Steve Niles (born 1965 in Jackson Township, New Jersey), comic book author, screenwriter and punk rock musician; grew up in Reston
- Jacob Sartorius, singer and internet personality
- Eddie Timanus (born 1968 in St. Joseph, Missouri), Jeopardy! champion; USA Today sportswriter; grew up in Reston
- Lynd Ward, artist

== Business ==
- Stephanie Hannon, developer of Google Wave, first female technology officer of a major political campaign
- Michael Pocalyko, businessman, entrepreneur and author
- Robert E. Simon, founder of Reston

== Crime ==
- Lloyd R. Woodson, arrested in 2010 with military-grade illegal weapons he intended to use in a violent crime, and a detailed map of the Fort Drum military installation

== Politics and government ==
- Randy Babbitt, former administrator of the Federal Aviation Administration
- Milt Bearden, retired Central Intelligence Agency officer; author (The Black Tulip, The Main Enemy); frequent contributor to the New York Times, Los Angeles Times and Wall Street Journal
- T. Keith Glennan, first administrator of NASA
- Alan Larson (born 1949), diplomat and ambassador
- Kenneth R. Plum (D), Virginia House of Delegates Democratic Caucus leader, represented Reston
- Howard Wolpe, former member of the United States House of Representatives

== Science and academia ==
- Gordon P. Eaton, geologist
- Arnold Kramish, nuclear physicist who worked on the Manhattan Project
- Stephen C. Smith, author and professor

== Sports ==
- Maame Biney, US Olympic Speed Skater in the 2018 Winter Olympics
- Grant Hill, NBA player for the Detroit Pistons, Orlando Magic, Phoenix Suns, and Los Angeles Clippers; South Lakes High School graduate; analyst for CBS and TNT Sports
- Michael Jackson, South Lakes High School graduate; 1984 NCAA champion with Georgetown University; NBA player for the Sacramento Kings; former executive at Nike, Inc.
- Paul Mulvey, former professional hockey player
- Kevin Payne, former president of D.C. United
- Eddie Royal, NFL wide receiver for the Chicago Bears; played football for one season at South Lakes High School
- Michael Shabaz, professional tennis player
- Wyatt Toregas, MLB player, Cleveland Indians and Pittsburgh Pirates
- Alan Webb, professional track athlete; holder of the American record in the mile run; attended South Lakes High School
- Carlos Yates, George Mason University nationally ranked top scoring basketball player; record holder; attended Flint Hill School
