= KROQ (disambiguation) =

KROQ may refer to:

- KROQ-FM, a radio station (106.7 MHz) in Pasadena, California
- KROQ (1500 AM), a defunct radio station in Burbank, California, which held the call sign KROQ from 1972 to 1984
- 92.5 Gold FM, a radio station in Gold Coast, Queensland, Australia formerly known as KROQ
