= KROQ-FM =

Alternative rock radio station in Los Angeles

- Pasadena, California; United States
- Broadcast area: Greater Los Angeles
- Frequency: 106.7 MHz (HD Radio)
- Branding: World Famous KROQ

Programming
- Language: English
- Format: Alternative rock
- Subchannels: HD2: New wave; classic alternative "Roq of the 80s"

Ownership
- Owner: Audacy, Inc.; (Audacy License, LLC)
- Sister stations: KCBS-FM; KFRG; KNX; KNX-FM; KRTH; KTWV; KXFG

History
- First air date: April 23, 1962
- Former call signs: KPPC-FM (1962–1973)
- Call sign meaning: Taken from KROQ (AM), billed "The ROQ (rock) of Los Angeles"

Technical information
- Licensing authority: FCC
- Facility ID: 28622
- Class: B
- ERP: 5,500 watts; 5,600 watts with beam tilt
- HAAT: 423 meters (1,388 ft)
- Transmitter coordinates: 34°11′49.21″N 118°15′32.07″W

Links
- Public license information: Public file; LMS
- Webcast: Listen live (via Audacy); Listen live (via Audacy) (HD2)
- Website: audacy.com/kroq; audacy.com/roqofthe80s (HD2)

KROQ-FM (106.7 MHz) is a commercial radio station licensed to Pasadena, California, serving Greater Los Angeles. Owned by Audacy, Inc., it broadcasts an alternative rock format known as "The World Famous KROQ" (pronounced /keɪrɑːk/). Its current weekday lineup includes Klein.Ally.Show. in the mornings, middays with Doug "Sluggo" Roberts, afternoon drive with Kevin Ryder, and evenings with Megan Holiday.

The station has studios at the intersection of Wilshire Blvd. and Hauser Blvd. in the Miracle Mile neighborhood of Los Angeles. The transmitter is based in the Verdugo Mountains. It was the flagship station of Kevin & Bean and Loveline which was originally hosted by Jim "The Poorman" Trenton with Dr. Drew Pinsky.

== History ==
=== KPPC ===
KPPC logo used during the freeform period

On April 23, 1962, KPPC-FM signed-on on 106.7 MHz. It was owned by the Pasadena Presbyterian Church as a companion to its KPPC, a limited-hours AM radio station that had broadcast since 1924.

In 1967, the Pasadena Presbyterian Church sold KPPC-AM-FM to Crosby-Avery Broadcasting for $310,000. The church had been attempting to sell the radio stations for a year; station manager Edgar Pierce said the church found commercial radio incompatible with the noncommercial nature of its other efforts. Crosby-Avery was owned by Leon Crosby, a general manager of San Francisco's KMPX, a station that had just gone to a full-time freeform progressive rock format, and Lewis Avery, former partner in a national ad sales firm. With KMPX soaring to success but KPPC, with its middle-of-the-road format, ailing, Crosby and Avery brought in the architects of KMPX, Tom and Raechel Donahue, to turn around their new station in Southern California.

Hosts during KPPC's "underground" format included B. Mitchel Reed, Tom Donahue, Les Carter, Ed Mitchell, Steven Clean, Outrageous Nevada, novelty music historian Dr. Demento, Charles Laquidara, Elliot Mintz, blues archivist Johnny Otis, Barbara Birdfeather, and more.

In 1969, Crosby sold KPPC-AM-FM and KMPX to the National Science Network for $1.2 million. Crosby used the funds to buy a then-silent San Francisco television station, KEMO-TV. National Science Network's management of the KPPC stations was turbulent, capped by an October 1971 mass firing of the air staff, but the period also included technical upgrades. NSN moved the studios out of the church basement and to 99 Chester Street in Pasadena and the transmitter to Flint Peak, with a slight power increase to 25,700 watts.

In 1971, Ludwig Wolfgang Frohlich, founder of the National Science Network and previous owner of an ad agency, died. Upon his death, control of the estate was transferred to Ingrid and Thomas Burns.

=== KROQ AM and KROQ-FM ===
==== Beginnings and brief closing (1972–1974) ====
Country music station KBBQ (1500 AM) in Burbank became KROQ in September 1972, changing its format to Top 40 and hiring established disc jockeys from other stations. The new KROQ called itself "K-ROCK, the ROQ of Los Angeles". In 1973, with National Science Network's estate selling off its assets, KROQ's owners bought KPPC-AM-FM (immediately divesting the AM station to meet then-current ownership limits), changed the calls to KROQ-FM and hired Shadoe Stevens to create a new rock format described as high-energy "all-cutting-edge-rock-all-the-time" and began simulcasting as "The ROQs of L.A.: Mother Rock!" Meanwhile, KPPC on 1240 AM was sold to Universal Broadcasting, a religious broadcaster, and remained on the air with its limited-schedule of Wednesday evening and Sunday operation until subsequent owners took the station off the air permanently in 1996.

The two stations (KROQ-AM/FM) were wildly successful initially with the new format, but poor money management plagued the enterprise. When concert promoter Ken Roberts booked Sly and the Family Stone and Sha Na Na for one KROQ-sponsored show at the Los Angeles Coliseum and the station found itself unable to cover expenses, Roberts agreed to pay for the band to play the show in exchange for a small ownership stake in the station. Roberts joined a sprawling ownership group which included a doctor, two dairymen, a political lobbyist, a secretary, and several other minor investors. Roberts, with his background in the music industry, made him a logical choice for president of the struggling company in the minds of the other shareholders, and he was elected such at the first meeting he attended in 1974.

By 1974, the station's finances were already untenable following a year of commercial-free programming – a stunt implemented in an effort to gain market share. The stations' debt load reached $7 million; paychecks began to bounce and Shadoe Stevens and the bulk of the staff walked out, shutting the stations down. The closure would last for nearly two years.

==== Rebirth and increasing popularity (1975–1989) ====
Logo used from the station's 1976 relaunch until 1979

In late 1975, the FCC ordered KROQ to return to the airwaves or surrender the stations' licenses. With barebones equipment, KROQ returned to the airwaves on June 10, 1976, broadcasting initially from the transmitter location, followed by a penthouse suite in the Pasadena Hilton Hotel, then again across the street from the Hilton (117 S. Los Robles).

Ken Roberts returned to the reborn station in a more forceful ownership role, buying out his partners one by one until he remained the sole owner of the station.

KROQ's rebirth was simultaneous with the emergence of punk rock in the late 1970s and new wave, and KROQ quickly became the voice of the burgeoning Los Angeles punk and new wave scene. Disc jockey Rodney Bingenheimer introduced many new bands on his show. As punk expanded its hold on the music scene during the mid to late 1970s, and KROQ steadily adding more of it to their freeform format, this cemented their place in the Los Angeles market.

In 1979, Shadoe Stevens once again left the station, with Rick Carroll taking over as program director, and took all of the new music and combined it in a Top 40 formatic structure. By 1980, the station had fully committed to a post-new wave modern rock orientation. KROQ became an even greater success as the "Rock of the 80s" evolved. During that decade, the station mixed punk rock, such as the Ramones, the Clash, the Weirdos, Fear, the Pandoras and X, with new wave, such as U2, Oingo Boingo, Talking Heads, the Police, the Cars, Devo, Sparks, Berlin, Duran Duran, Pet Shop Boys, Blondie, the Go Go's, Squeeze, Culture Club, the Jam, Elvis Costello, the Bangles, Bananarama, the Cult, the Cure, ska and similar genres with artists such as English Beat, Fine Young Cannibals and 1960s underground rocker Iggy Pop, and huge mainstream artists such as the Beach Boys and the Rolling Stones. It was also not uncommon for certain KROQ dee-jays to play then-current hip hop and soul/funk artists such as Arrested Development, Prince and Parliament-Funkadelic.

In 1980, the original AM station broke away from the FM's rock programming, becoming a Spanish-language music station. Due to multiple regulatory violations on the part of its owner, the FCC would not renew the station's license, and it would cease broadcasting in 1984.

By 1982, Billboard magazine reported that KROQ Arbitron numbers of 3.7 were closing in on AOR leaders KMET at 4.0 and KLOS at 3.9.

Carroll, as a consultant, took the "Rock of the 80s" format to other stations, including 91X in San Diego, KOEU in Palm Springs, California, KMGN FM in Bakersfield, California, The Quake in San Francisco and KYYX in Seattle, among a few others on the US West Coast in the 1980s.

In 1986, KROQ was purchased at a then-record $45 million by Infinity Broadcasting. By the late 1980s, the station had started dipping in the ratings. New wave had declined in popularity and electronic dance bands, such as Depeche Mode and New Order, started getting more airplay on the station. Also during this period, KROQ began focusing on college rock (or so-called alternative rock) by adding bands into their playlist such as R.E.M., the Red Hot Chili Peppers, the Psychedelic Furs, ABC, the Smiths, Frankie Goes to Hollywood, Bronski Beat, Echo & the Bunnymen, the Replacements, Camper Van Beethoven, Jane's Addiction, the Pixies, the Alarm, the Cult, Violent Femmes, Love and Rockets, Dramarama, and Social Distortion, as well as heavier acts like Faith No More and Living Colour and guitar-oriented hip-hop groups like Run-DMC and the Beastie Boys.

==== KROQ in the 1990s and continued popularity (1990–1999) ====
Throughout the 1990s, KROQ's format focused on mainly alternative rock (or alternative metal), grunge, pop-punk, Britpop, industrial music and nu metal, giving up-and-coming bands their first exposure on the station or in Southern California, including Nirvana, the Red Hot Chili Peppers, the Smashing Pumpkins, Pearl Jam, Nine Inch Nails, Oasis, the Gin Blossoms, Foo Fighters, Green Day, the Offspring, Sublime, No Doubt, Rage Against the Machine, Korn, Bad Religion, Weezer, Blink-182, Jimmy Eat World, Hole, Garbage, Lenny Kravitz and System of a Down. They also began adding heavier acts to their playlists such as Metallica, Soundgarden, Alice in Chains and Tool, all of whom were staples on the Long Beach heavy metal radio station KNAC, formerly an alternative/new wave/punk rock radio station. These helped the station surge back to number one in the ratings, at which it remained until the mid-2000s, when it slipped to the middle-of-the-pack, ratings-wise, for Los Angeles area radio stations.

The 1990s also saw a continuation of the weekday morning Kevin & Bean Show, as well as "Rodney on the Roq," hosted by Rodney Bingenheimer, on Sunday nights. In late nights, the station aired Loveline, hosted by "The Poorman" Jim Trenton and Dr. Drew Pinsky. The show's purpose was to bring correct information regarding human sexuality and relationships to those 13 to 25 years of age. KROQ also began its own festivals Almost Acoustic Christmas and Weenie Roast, which had taken place every year since 1990 and 1993 respectively; due to the COVID-19 pandemic, there were no lineups for Almost Acoustic Christmas in 2020 and 2021, while there have been no editions of the Weenie Roast since 2019.

In June 1990, Kevin and Bean secretly arranged for a friend to pretend to confess to killing his girlfriend during their "Confess Your Crime" segment. The hoax resulted in investigations by the Sheriff's Department, the FCC, NBC's Unsolved Mysteries and other news media. The hoax was exposed 10 months later after KROQ had unknowingly hired the caller, Doug "the Slug" Roberts, as a DJ and the three were heard talking about the hoax on a monitored phone line at KROQ. Kevin and Bean paid the Sheriff's Department $12,170 for the cost of the investigation, and performed 149 hours of community service to compensate for the 149 hours the homicide detective spent on the case. KROQ received a letter of reprimand from the FCC for the incident, the lightest punishment the FCC could give.

In 1997, KROQ/Infinity merged with CBS, later changing its name to CBS Radio.

==== Later history (2000–2016) ====
Originally located at 117 S. Los Robles Avenue in Pasadena, the station moved to 3500 W. Olive Avenue in Burbank in 1987 as part of the purchase agreement and to be closer to the music industry. In 2002, the station was moved to a facility at 5901 Venice Boulevard in the Crestview neighborhood in West Los Angeles.

Unlike most other (Class B, but with grandfathered greater than B facilities) FM stations in Los Angeles whose transmitters are atop Mount Wilson, KROQ's (Class B) transmitter is located on Tongva Peak in Glendale at an altitude of 2,650 ft., which results in somewhat weaker signal coverage.

KROQ's format had varied throughout the 2000s and 2010s. The radio station's format had repeated much of the same formula as the 1990s, mixing heavier acts like Linkin Park, Staind, P.O.D., Seether, Velvet Revolver, Cold and Saliva, with punk rock like Rise Against, Sum 41, AFI, Fall Out Boy, My Chemical Romance, Jimmy Eat World, Panic! at the Disco and Thrice, and with alternative/indie/garage rock acts such as Muse, Queens of the Stone Age, the Strokes, the Bravery, Arcade Fire and the Killers. This new crop of rock acts found considerable popularity on the radio station while sharing airspace with many KROQ veterans such as Nirvana, the Red Hot Chili Peppers, Metallica, Foo Fighters, Weezer, Green Day, the Offspring, Blink-182, No Doubt, System of a Down, Korn, Jane's Addiction, the Beastie Boys, Sublime, Bad Religion, Stone Temple Pilots, Incubus, Nine Inch Nails, Social Distortion and Cypress Hill.

KROQ logo from the 2000s/2010s on display in Westchester, Los Angeles, California (2026)

In 2004, KROQ began broadcasting in HD Radio. On February 20, 2006, KROQ added streaming music from the radio station to its website. On June 9, 2006, KROQ launched an HD sub-carrier, KROQ HD-2, which airs new wave and alternative tracks from the 1980s which were popular during KROQ's heyday (and is also branded "KROQ 2: Roq of the 80s").

In February 2010, CBS Radio, which controlled the live stream, blocked access for listeners outside of the United States.

Steve Jones came to KROQ from Indie 103.1 with a Sunday night show called "Jonesy's Jukebox", which ran from 7 to 9 pm during 2010–2013 before moving to KLOS.

In February 2015, KROQ severed ties with Boyd "Doc on the Roq" Britton and Lisa May after deciding to drop news and traffic. The news came as a shock for longtime listeners as Doc on the Roq had been reporting news for the station for 27 years while Lisa May had been reporting traffic for the past 24 years. Fans took to Facebook to boycott the station for not renewing their contracts.

==== Management and audience changes, ratings decline (2017–2022) ====
On February 2, 2017, CBS Radio announced it would merge with Entercom. The merger was approved on November 9, 2017, and was consummated on November 17.

Logo used from 2020 to 2022

After a 28-year run at the station, Senior VP of Programming Kevin Weatherly exited the station to start a new role as Spotify's new Head of North American Programming. Mike Kaplan replaced Weatherly at KROQ in February 2020.

On March 18, 2020, Kevin Ryder announced on Twitter that he, Allie MacKay, Jensen Karp, and producer Dave Sanchez had all been let go from the morning show. The show would be replaced by afternoon hosts Ted Stryker and Kevin Klein. In September 2020, the show would be added on sister stations KVIL in Dallas, KITS in San Francisco, and KRBZ in Kansas City via syndication as part of a company initiative to expand networked programming among the company's alternative stations due to COVID-19 pandemic-related cutbacks and layoffs.

The firing of Ryder marked a new chapter for KROQ under the leadership of brand manager Mike Kaplan. Kaplan previously served as program director of iHeartMedia's KYSR from 2013 to 2018.

By the end of the Weatherly era, KROQ had essentially shifted to a classic alternative format that leaned heavily on heritage acts. Weatherly added new titles to the playlist very conservatively. Kaplan's strategy differed from Weatherly's; he immediately shifted the playlist to focus on alternative pop, with heavy airplay of artists including Billie Eilish, Machine Gun Kelly, Post Malone, Powfu, 24kGoldn, Beabadoobee and Dominic Fike. The station also decreased airplay of most 1990s and 2000s alternative titles and artists that defined the station during its heyday, including System of a Down and Muse. The changes drew ire from cultural critics and former KROQ on-air talent, followed by a steep ratings decline.

In 2021, Stryker left KROQ (later landing at rival KYSR) and the morning show was renamed "Klein.Ally.Show." Around this time, the show stopped being syndicated to focus solely on its KROQ audience. Also in 2021, longtime DJ Kat Corbett left the station, having joined in 1999.

==== Return to form (2022–present) ====
Weatherly would return to KROQ as Senior Vice President of Programming in May 2022, replacing Kaplan. Since then, the station has greatly reduced its focus on alternative rock and has increased airplay of classic alternative tracks from the 1990s and 2000s.

On October 5, 2024, KROQ introduced a new electronic dance music show, KROQ EQ, on Saturday nights, with Justice performing a guest DJ set for its premiere edition.

For a short period in 2024-25, the station resurrected Loveline as a local, Sunday night show hosted by Kevan Kenney and Dr. Tara Suwinyattichaiporn.

Kevin Ryder returned to KROQ on April 1, 2025, after five years, this time as an afternoon host. Current afternoon host Megan Holliday shifted to the night shift, replacing Kevan Kenney. In July 2025, longtime DJ Nicole Alvarez left the station and later penned a farewell message that lamented the state of the radio industry. In November 2025, Variety reported that the station was experiencing its highest ratings in 15 years thanks to the return of Weatherly, Ryder, and a rock-heavy playlist.

== Awards ==
KROQ was awarded Radio Station of the Year in 1992 and 1993 by Rolling Stone magazine readers poll issues.

In 2007, the station was nominated for the top 25 markets Alternative station of the year award by Radio & Records magazine. Other nominees included WBCN in Boston, Massachusetts; KTBZ-FM in Houston, Texas; KITS in San Francisco, California; KNDD in Seattle, Washington; and WWDC in Washington, DC.

KROQ was the recipient of an Alternate Contraband Award for Major Market Radio Alternative Radio Station of the Year 2012.

KROQ was inducted into the Rock Radio Hall of Fame in 2014.

== HD Radio ==
KROQ broadcasts a second HD Radio subchannel, with KROQ-HD2 airing The ROQ of the 80's, which features classic rock from the 1980s. In August 2018, Entercom announced it would re-launch the subchannel, adding former KROQ personalities Freddy Snakeskin and Tami Heide as DJs. In 2020, KROQ activated an HD3 subchannel, which aired a new alternative rock format branded as "New Arrivals." On September 23, 2022, the HD3 channel was dropped from the broadcast lineup entirely.

== Notable staff ==
- Rodney Bingenheimer (1976–2017)
- Richard Blade (1982–2000)
- Adam Carolla, Loveline, "Mr. Birchum" on the morning drive time Kevin and Bean Show (1995–2005)
- Carson Daly (1996)
- Raechel Donahue (1980–1986)
- Ralph Garman (1997 – November 30, 2017)
- Mark Goodman (1990s)
- Jed the Fish (Edwin "Jed" Gould, III), week-day drive time show (1978–1984, 1985–2011)
- Chris Hardwick (1994–1998)
- Thomas Gaither "The Thomas Guide", Late nights and weekends (1992–1995)
- Tami Heide (1991–2004, 2018–2022 HD2)
- J. J. Jackson (1987)
- Kennedy (1991–1992)
- Kevin and Bean (1990–2020)
  - Kevin Ryder (solo: January–March 2020, 2025–present)
- Jimmy Kimmel "Jimmy the Sports Guy" on the morning show (1994–1999)
- "Spacin'" Scott Mason (1979–2000), former Director of Engineering; West Coast at CBS Radio
- Kevin McKeown (1976–1978) GM, exec. prod. Hollywood Niteshift, future Mayor Santa Monica
- Frank Murphy, producer of Kevin and Bean
- Cassandra Peterson "Elvira Mistress of the ROQ" (1982–1983)
- Dr. Drew Pinsky, Loveline
- Riki Rachtman, Loveline (1993–1996)
- Frazer Smith (1976–1980)
- Matt "Money" Smith "KROQ Sports Guy" (1994–2005)
- Shadoe Stevens (1973–1980) First air personality and founding program director.
- Dusty Street (1979–1989), on-air host
- Stryker
- Jim Trenton "The Poor Man" (1982–1993), creator and host of Loveline, also host of the show for many years with co-host Dr. Drew Pinsky
- Ian Whitcomb (Weekends – early 1980s)
- Stanley Sheff (1977–1982)
- Klein and Ally
- Farley Malorrus (1983-1992) KROQ Astrologer, Love line Host, Famous for Earthquake Predictions on KROQ (KOBE/NORTHRIDGE), Late Show appearance

== Festivals ==
- KROQ Almost Acoustic Christmas, first held in December 1989. The festival was initially called KROQ Xmas Bash. Due to the COVID-19 pandemic, there were no editions of the Almost Acoustic Christmas for 2020 and 2021.
- KROQ Weenie Roast, first held in June 1993; however, this festival had been presented in May from 2005 to 2009 and again from 2012 to 2018. Due to the COVID-19 pandemic, there have been no editions of the Weenie Roast since 2019.
- KROQ LA Invasion, held from 2001 to 2007.
- Epicenter, held from 2009 to 2015, although there was no 2014 edition of this festival.

== KROQ-related albums ==
- KROQ Calendar & New Music, a compilation of new singles that premiered in the subsequent year (1995–present)
- Rodney on the ROQ, Vol. 1 a classic punk compilation from KROQ's Rodney Bingenheimer
- Rodney on the ROQ Volume 2 more good punk from KROQ's Rodney Bingenheimer
- Rodney on the ROQ Vol III even more punk from KROQ's Rodney Bingenheimer
- At KROQ (1991), a CD-single by Morrissey
- On KROQ's Loveline, CD by Hagfish
- The Best of KROQ's Almost Acoustic Christmas (1999), a compilation of concerts recorded at the Acoustic Christmas
- Kevin & Bean's Super Christmas (2006)
- Kevin & Bean's Christmastime in the 909 (2004)
- Kevin and Bean: The Year They Recalled Santa Claus (2003)
- Kevin and Bean: Fo' Shizzle St. Nizzle (2002)
- Kevin and Bean: Swallow My Eggnog (2001)
- Kevin and Bean: The Real Slim Santa (2000)
- Kevin and Bean: Last Christmas (1999)
- Kevin and Bean: Santa's Swingin' Sack (1998)
- Kevin and Bean: A Family Christmas in Your Ass (1997)
- Kevin and Bean: Christmastime in the LBC (1996) – cassette tape
- Kevin and Bean: How the Juice Stole Christmas (1995) – cassette tape
- Kevin and Bean: No Toys for OJ (1994) – cassette tape
- Kevin and Bean: Santa Claus, Schamanta Claus (1993) – cassette tape
- Kevin and Bean: We've Got Your Yule Logs Hangin' (1992) – cassette tape
- Kevin and Bean: Bogus Christmas (1991) – cassette tape
- Kevin and Bean: Feel the Warmth of Kevin and Bean's Wonderful World of Christmas (The White Album) (1990) – LP
- KROQ Locals Only Vol. 1 (2019)
- Kroqing in Pasadena, a single from XTC (1989)
- Richard Blade's Flashback Favorites, Volumes 1–6 (1993)

== See also ==
- KROQ Top 106.7 Countdowns
