= Deep Tracks =

- Broadcast area: United States; Canada
- Frequencies: Sirius XM Radio 308; Dish Network 6027

Programming
- Format: Classic Rock

Ownership
- Owner: Sirius XM Radio

Technical information
- Class: Satellite Radio Station

Links
- Website: SiriusXM: Deep Tracks

Deep Tracks is a SiriusXM Radio channel created by George Taylor Morris, which features lesser-known classic rock music selections such as album tracks, live recordings, "forgotten 45s" and B-sides. Carl Kranz is Deep Tracks' current programming director.

Previous logo, used until April 2009. Still seen on current brochures of Sirius Canada.

The current (as of May 2026) DJ lineup is Earle Bailey and Carol Miller. Earle's 6-hour shift starts at 11 am ET, beginning each program with an hourlong (sometimes longer) thematic set called The Daily Bailey Head Trip. Carol hosts weekend mornings beginning at 8 am ET. Greg Roberson, who had hosted shows 7 days a week, aired his final show on April 10, 2026. Early Times, who also had been on every day of the week, aired his final program on May 3, 2026, leaving the station with only 2 regular show hosts.

As of May 2026, a pair of guest-hosts air monthly shows on the channel: Joe Elliot (of Def Leppard) hosts a one-hour show called Songs from the Vault, and Steven Wilson (of Porcupine Tree) hosts a two-hour program called Intrigue: The Progressive Rock Show.

Dusty Street and Jim Ladd were prominent hosts for the channel; both died in 2023.

The station appears on SiriusXM Radio as channel 308.

Originally it replaced The Vault as a part of the Sirius/XM merger in 2008. It can also be heard on Dish Network channel 6027 (It was previously on 6016, until Sirius XM's The Blend took Sirius XM Radio 16 and Dish Network 6016.) As of April 2009, this channel has changed its logo, taking the logo from former XM channel Top Tracks, which was replaced by Classic Vinyl post-Sirius/XM merger.

The name is a remnant of XM's old classic rock stations: Big Tracks, Top Tracks, and Deep Tracks. Big Tracks became Classic Rewind. Top Tracks became Classic Vinyl.

The original programmer for the channel, George Taylor Morris, departed in the summer of 2008 due to health issues.

Before the station moved from Channel 27 to its current (as of 2026) home on Channel 308, it would occasionally dedicate multi-day remembrances for important musicians who had died very recently. For one week in January 2020, the station exclusively played music by Rush in tribute to the band's drummer Neil Peart, who died on January 7, 2020. On October 6, 2020, the station started playing music by Van Halen in tribute to Eddie Van Halen, who had died that day. The first song played was "Jamie's Cryin'." Other artists highlighted in this way included Christine McVie, David Crosby, and Charlie Watts.

== Core artists ==
- Aerosmith
- The Alan Parsons Project
- Alice Cooper
- Allman Brothers
- Arlo Guthrie
- The Band
- Be Bop Deluxe
- The Beach Boys
- The Beatles and solo careers
- Billy Joel
- Blood, Sweat & Tears
- Blue Öyster Cult
- Bob Dylan
- Bob Seger
- Bonnie Raitt
- Bruce Springsteen
- Bryan Ferry
- The Byrds
- Cactus
- Camel
- Canned Heat
- Cat Stevens
- The Chambers Brothers
- Cheap Trick
- Chicago
- The Clash
- Cream
- Creedence Clearwater Revival
- Crosby, Stills, Nash & Young
- Curved Air
- David Bowie
- Deep Purple
- Dire Straits
- Donovan
- Doobie Brothers
- The Doors
- Dr. John
- Eagles
- Electric Light Orchestra
- Elton John
- Eric Burdon and The Animals
- Emerson, Lake & Palmer
- Faces
- Fairport Convention
- Fleetwood Mac
- Frank Zappa
- Free
- Genesis
- Grateful Dead
- The Guess Who
- Heart
- Humble Pie
- J. Geils Band
- Jackson Browne
- Janis Joplin
- Joe Walsh and James Gang
- John Prine
- Jefferson Airplane
- Jethro Tull
- Jimi Hendrix Experience
- Joe Cocker
- Joe Jackson
- John Mellencamp
- Joni Mitchell
- Kansas
- King Crimson
- The Kinks
- Laura Nyro
- Led Zeppelin
- Leon Russell
- Little Feat
- Loggins & Messina
- Love
- Lynyrd Skynyrd
- MacDonald & Giles
- Manassas
- Moby Grape
- The Moody Blues
- Mott the Hoople
- Mountain
- Neil Young & Crazy Horse
- Nick Lowe
- NRBQ
- Patti Smith
- Paul Butterfield Blues Band
- Peter Frampton
- Pink Floyd
- The Police
- The Pretenders
- Procol Harum
- Queen
- Quicksilver Messenger Service
- Randy Newman
- Rare Earth
- The Rascals
- Renaissance
- Richie Havens
- Robert Palmer
- The Rolling Stones
- Rush
- Santana
- Savoy Brown
- The Sonics
- Spirit
- Small Faces
- Steely Dan
- Steppenwolf
- Steve Miller Band
- Supertramp
- T. Rex
- Taj Mahal
- Ten Years After
- Thin Lizzy
- Tina Turner
- Todd Rundgren
- Tom Petty
- Tower of Power
- Traffic
- Van Morrison
- War
- Warren Zevon
- Wishbone Ash
- Yardbirds
- Yes
- The Who
- Velvet Underground
- ZZ Top
- The Zombies
- 10cc
