= Keep On Truckin' =

Keep On Truckin' may refer to:

- Keep On Truckin' (comics), a comic and visual motif of underground comix by Robert Crumb

== Television ==
- Keep On Truckin' (The Conners), the 2018 series premiere of the American sitcom The Conners
- Keep On Truckin' (TV series), a 1975 American comedy series

== Music ==
- "Keep On Truckin'" (song), a 1973 song by Eddie Kendricks
- "Ja-Da" or "Keep On Truckin'", a 1918 song written by Bob Carleton
- Keep On Truckin', an album by Dave Dudley, or its title song
- Keep On Truckin', an album by Larry Scott
- "Keep On Truckin'", a song by Pnau from Sambanova
- "Keep On Truckin'", a song by the Road Hammers from The Road Hammers
- "Keep On Truckin", a 1972 song by Hot Tuna from Burgers

== See also ==
- "Truckin'", a song by the Grateful Dead
- "Truckin' My Blues Away", a 1936 song by Blind Boy Fuller, to which the R. Crumb comic refers
