= Stryker (DJ) =

American radio personality (born 1971)

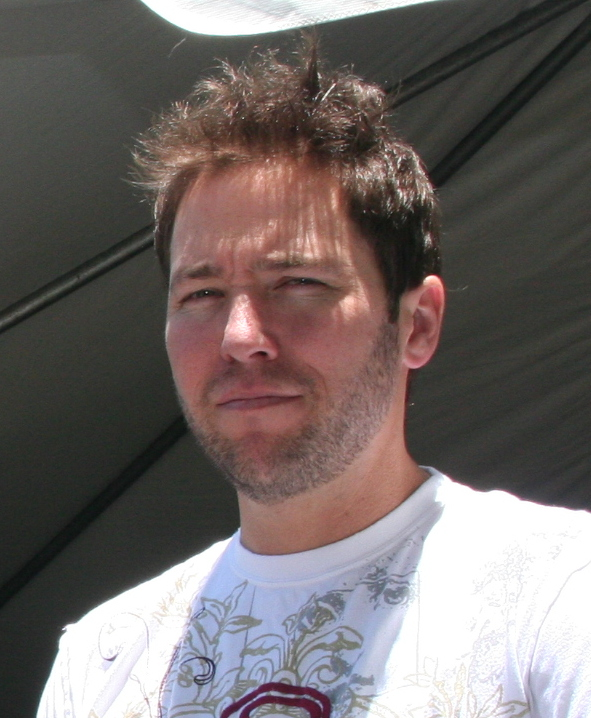
- Stryker in 2007
- Born: Gary Ramón Sandorf; June 4, 1971 (age 55); Los Angeles, California, U.S.
- Presenting career
- Show: Afternoons with Booker & Stryker
- Station: KYSR
- Time slot: 3-7 p.m. weekdays
- Country: United States

Theodore "Ted" Ramón Stryker (born Gary Ramón Sandorf; June 4, 1971), known on-air as simply "Stryker", is an American radio personality and disc jockey.

== Biography ==
Stryker began his radio career while attending the University of Arizona where he was a member of the Alpha Tau Omega fraternity. During those six and a half years, he began working at 92.1 KFMA in Tucson, Arizona, taking his air name from Robert Hays' character in the movie Airplane!. He eventually moved back to Los Angeles, California, and worked at KROQ-FM/106.7 as a music DJ from 4-7p.m. (PT).

From September 4, 2007 to September 9, 2008 he was the on-stage DJ for the 5th season of The Ellen DeGeneres Show. Stryker voiced himself as the in-game radio disc jockey in Burnout 3: Takedown. He has also hosted shows on MTV, Fox Sports, VH1, Fuse and Direct TV and has acted in several feature films, including Grandma's Boy, Out Cold and The Sweetest Thing (he played a club-goer who stumbles upon the sight of Christina Applegate being felt-up by two other women in the restroom).

During the August 2, 2004 episode of Loveline with guest Randy Jackson, it was discussed that he had been hired as one of the original judges on American Idol, a position which he turned down before filming began over image concerns. Jackson related Stryker's position as "It's going to blow my cool."

On February 3, 2009, Stryker announced on Loveline that he would be serving as a Dean for the 3rd season of VH-1's Charm School along with "LaLa" Vasquez and Ricki Lake. Coincidentally, he will be replacing Riki Rachtman, who also hosted Loveline from 1990 to 1995.

During the September 24, 2008 episode of Loveline, both DJ Samantha Ronson and actress Lindsay Lohan spoke to Stryker regarding the plane crash involving DJ AM and Travis Barker. During the conversation, Stryker casually asked Lohan how long she and Ronson had been together, to which Lohan confessed that they had been in a relationship for "a very long time". Despite obvious evidence before this incident, this remark unintentionally became what is widely regarded as Lohan officially 'coming out'.

Stryker has a handful of quirks, such as being able to spell and pronounce people's names backwards on the fly and formulate palindromes, as well as being mildly mysophobic. He revealed during several interviews that he was born with a tail, a benign protrusion of his coccyx (tail bone) from his lower back.

On April 22, 2009, Stryker announced his departure from Loveline per Westwood One. Ann Wilkins-Ingold briefly explained on the air that Stryker would be greatly missed, and the decision was solely based on Westwood One's unfortunate need to tighten its financial belt. Stryker was sad to leave, but upbeat during his announcement. He mentioned he would be back from time to time (as Westwood One has invited him to guest host periodically in the future). Stryker signed off officially at 10:56 p.m. Pacific Standard Time on April 22, 2009.

Stryker was on the air on KAMP-FM/97.1 from 3-7 p.m. weekdays. However, it was announced on February 26, 2010 that Stryker would return to his former position at KROQ-FM as the afternoon drive host on March 1, 2010.

On April 16, 2014 Stryker was a guest star on the webseries Talking Marriage with Ryan Bailey.

On March 18, 2020, Stryker and co-host Kevin Klein moved to mornings on KROQ replacing Kevin Ryder and the former morning show. Ryder was one half of the famed Kevin and Bean show that had been on the station since 1990. The Stryker & Kelin show also aired on KITS in San Francisco, KVIL in Dallas, and KRBZ in Kansas City.

On June 9, 2021, Stryker announced he would exit the KROQ morning show but would still be available for fill-in work.

On February 1, 2022, Stryker began co-hosting the afternoon show with Chris Booker at "ALT 98.7" KYSR in Los Angeles.

== Discography ==
=== Mixed compilations ===
- 2008: Total Dance 2008, Vol. 2

| Preceded by Adam Carolla | Co-host of Loveline; 2006–2009 | Succeeded by Psycho Mike |
