= Dihydrogen monoxide parody =

Parody where water is presented by an uncommon name

Dihydrogen monoxide is a name for the water molecule, which comprises two hydrogen atoms and one oxygen atom (H_{2}O).

The dihydrogen monoxide parody is the satirical phenomenon of referring to water (H_{2}O) by its unfamiliar chemical systematic name "dihydrogen monoxide" (DHMO) and describing some of its properties using alarming language – such as its ability to accelerate corrosion (rust) and cause suffocation (drowning) – often calling for it to be banned, regulated strictly, or labeled as a hazardous chemical.

The parody satirizes the irrational anxieties around chemicals (chemophobia), demonstrating how exaggerated analysis, information overload, and a lack of scientific literacy can lead to misplaced fears.

Sometimes other unfamiliar technical names are used: "hydrogen hydroxide", "dihydrogen oxide" and "hydric acid".

== History ==
In 1983, on April Fools' Day, an edition of the Durand Express, a weekly newspaper in Durand, Michigan, reported that "dihydrogen oxide" had been found in the city's water pipes, and warned that it was fatal if inhaled, and could produce blistering vapors.

The first appearance of the parody as "dihydrogen monoxide" on the Internet was attributed to the "Coalition to Ban Dihydrogen Monoxide", a parody organization at the University of California, Santa Cruz following on-campus postings and newsgroup discussions in 1990. This new version of the parody was created by housemates while attending UC Santa Cruz, in 1990, revised by Craig Jackson in 1994, and was published in Analog Science Fiction and Fact in March 1996. It received widespread public attention in 1997 when Nathan Zohner, a 14-year-old student, gathered petitions to ban "DHMO" as the basis of his science project, titled "How Gullible Are We?"

Jackson's original site included the following warning:

Dihydrogen monoxide:

- is also known as hydroxyl acid, and is the major component of acid rain.
- contributes to the "greenhouse effect".
- may cause severe burns.
- contributes to the erosion of our natural landscape.
- accelerates corrosion and rusting of many metals.
- may cause electrical failures and decreased effectiveness of automobile brakes.
- has been found in excised tumors of terminal cancer patients.

Despite the danger, dihydrogen monoxide is often used:

- as an industrial solvent and coolant.
- in nuclear power plants.
- in the production of styrofoam.
- as a fire retardant.
- in many forms of cruel animal research.
- in the distribution of pesticides. Even after washing, produce remains contaminated by this chemical.
- as an additive in certain "junk-foods" and other food products.

A mock material safety data sheet has also been created for DHMO.

== Molecular terminology and naming conventions ==
The water molecule has the chemical formula H_{2}O, meaning the molecule is composed of two hydrogen atoms and one oxygen atom. Literally, the term "dihydrogen monoxide" means "two hydrogen, one oxygen": the prefix di- in dihydrogen means "two", the prefix mono- in monoxide means "one", and "oxide" designates oxygen in a compound (the consecutive o's that would occur in "monooxide" are combined into one).

Using chemical nomenclature, other names for water include hydrogen oxide, hydrogen hydroxide, which characterises it as a base, and several designating it as an acid, such as hydric acid or hydroxyl acid. The term used in the original text, hydroxyl acid, is a non-standard name.

Under the 2005 revisions of IUPAC nomenclature of inorganic chemistry, there is no single correct name for every compound. The primary function of chemical nomenclature is to ensure that each name refers, unambiguously, to a single substance. It is considered less important to ensure that each substance should have a single unambiguous name, although the number of acceptable names is limited. Water is one acceptable name for this compound, even though it is neither a systematic nor an international name and is specific to just one phase of the compound (its liquid form). The other IUPAC recommendation is oxidane.

== Public use ==
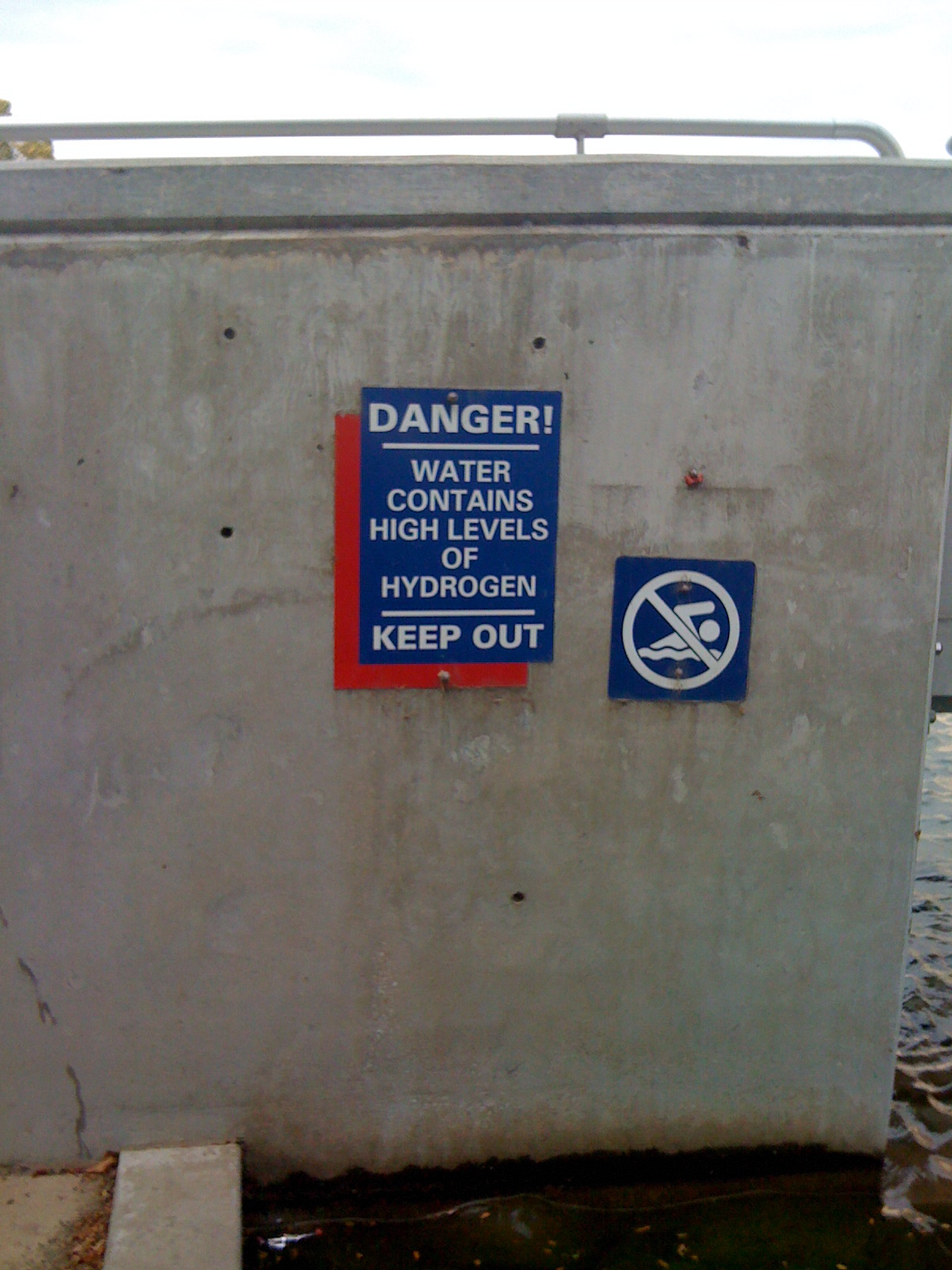
Tongue-in-cheek warning sign on a water tank in Louisville, Kentucky

- In 1989–1990, several students circulated a dihydrogen monoxide contamination warning on the University of California, Santa Cruz, campus via photocopied fliers.
- In 1994, Craig Jackson created a web page for the Coalition to Ban DHMO.
- The Friends of Hydrogen Hydroxide website was created by Dan Curtis Johnson, partly as a foil on the Coalition page, claiming to oppose its "subversive agenda". The site points out that hydrogen hydroxide is "environmentally safe" and "enhances the functionality, growth, and health of many forms of life".
- In 1997, Nathan Zohner, a 14-year-old student at Eagle Rock Junior High School in Idaho Falls, Idaho, gathered 43 votes to ban the chemical, out of 50 ninth-graders surveyed. Zohner received the first prize at Greater Idaho Falls Science Fair for analysis of the results of his survey. In recognition of his experiment, journalist James K. Glassman coined the term "Zohnerism" to refer to "the use of a true fact to lead a scientifically and mathematically ignorant public to a false conclusion".
- In late 1997, drawing inspiration from Jackson's web page and Zohner's research, Tom Way created a website at DHMO.org, including links to some legitimate sites such as the Environmental Protection Agency and National Institutes of Health.
- On April 1, 1998 (April Fools' Day), a member of the Australian Parliament announced a campaign to ban dihydrogen monoxide internationally.
- In 2001, a staffer in New Zealand Green Party MP Sue Kedgley's office responded to a request for support for a campaign to ban dihydrogen monoxide by saying she was "absolutely supportive of the campaign to ban this toxic substance". This was criticized in a press release by the National Party, one of whose MPs fell for the very same joke six years later.
- In 2002, radio talk show host Neal Boortz mentioned on the air that the Atlanta water system had been checked and found to be contaminated with dihydrogen monoxide, and set about relating the hazards associated with that "dangerous" chemical. A local TV station even covered the 'scandal'. A spokesperson for the city's water system told the reporter that there was no more dihydrogen monoxide in the system than what was allowed under the law.
- The idea was used for a segment of an episode of the Penn & Teller documentary show Penn & Teller: Bullshit!, in which actress Kris McGaha and a camera crew gathered signatures from people considering themselves "concerned environmentalists" to sign a petition to ban DHMO.
- In March 2004, Aliso Viejo, California, almost considered banning the use of foam containers at city-sponsored events because dihydrogen monoxide is part of their production. A paralegal had asked the city council to put it on the agenda; he later attributed it to poor research. The bill was pulled from the agenda before it could come to a vote, but not before the city received a raft of bad publicity.
- In 2006, in Louisville, Kentucky, David Karem, executive director of the Waterfront Development Corporation, a public body that operates Waterfront Park, wished to deter bathers from using a large public fountain. "Counting on a lack of understanding about water's chemical makeup", he arranged for signs reading: "DANGER! – WATER CONTAINS HIGH LEVELS OF HYDROGEN – KEEP OUT" to be posted on the fountain at public expense.
- In 2007, Jacqui Dean, New Zealand National Party MP, fell for the joke, writing a letter to Associate Minister of Health Jim Anderton asking "Does the Expert Advisory Committee on Drugs have a view on the banning of this drug?"
- On April 1, 2009, then-Canadian Member of Parliament, Andrew Scheer (who was later elected leader of the Conservative Party), used the DHMO parody as the basis for an April Fool's Day "media release" on his website, in which he claimed to have presented a bill to ban the substance from all federal government buildings.
- In February 2011, during the campaign of the Finnish parliamentary election, a voting advice application asked the candidates whether the availability of "hydric acid, also known as dihydrogen monoxide" should be restricted. 49% of the candidates answered in favor of the restriction.
- In April 2013, as part of an April Fools' Day prank, two radio personalities at Gator Country 101.9, a station in Lee County, Florida, were suspended for a few days after telling listeners that dihydrogen monoxide was coming out of their water taps. The prank resulted in several calls by consumers to the local utility company, necessitating that the company send out a press release stating that the water was safe.
- In May 2018, a noticeboard in Wuling Farm warned visitors that they were "using dihydrogen monoxide" (to make it look like using a pesticide) at the apple tree farms to prevent theft.

== Notable older uses ==
- Robert A. Heinlein's 1961 novel "Stranger in a Strange Land" references "hydrogen monoxide."

== See also ==
- Sense and reference
