= KBLV =

KBLV may refer to:

- KBLV (FM), a radio station (88.7 FM) licensed to Tehachapi, California, United States
- KZPT (FM), a radio station (99.7 FM) licensed to Kansas City, Missouri, United States, which held the call sign KBLV from January 2008 to January 2009
- Scott Air Force Base / MidAmerica St. Louis Airport ICAO Code KBLV
- A defunct AM radio station in Pasadena, California on 1240 kHz
