= The Vault (Sirius) =

- Broadcast area: Off-air
- Frequency: Sirius 16; Dish Network 6016

Programming
- Format: Deep Classic rock

Ownership
- Owner: Sirius Satellite Radio

Technical information
- Class: Satellite Radio Station

Links
- Website: www.sirius.com/thevault

The Vault was a Deep Album Cuts Classic rock music channel that aired on Sirius Satellite Radio channel 16 and Dish Network channel 6016. The channel was officially dropped on November 12, 2008 because of the Sirius-XM merger, and replaced by XM's Deep Tracks.

The Vault was one of the early satellite stations to broadcast in Dolby matrix surround sound.

The station advertised itself as one that would play deep cuts of classic rock, and Entertainment Weekly described The Vault as "a channel that spins less-familiar songs by dad-rock favorites like Eric Clapton and the Kinks". The station aired a week-long marathon of Pink Floyd and David Gilmour tracks in March 2006.

== See also ==
- List of Sirius Satellite Radio stations
