= Loveline (TV series) =

- Genre: Late-night talk show
- Presented by: Drew Pinsky; Adam Carolla
- Country of origin: United States
- Original language: English
- No. of seasons: 5

Production
- Executive producers: Scott A. Stone; David G. Stanley
- Camera setup: Multiple
- Running time: 60 minutes
- Production companies: MTV; Stone Stanley Productions

Original release
- Network: MTV
- Release: November 11, 1996 – 2000

Loveline is a weekly television talk show that aired on MTV from 1996 to 2000, hosted by Drew Pinsky, a doctor and addiction medicine specialist, and comedian Adam Carolla. It is an adaptation of Loveline, a radio call-in show that the two hosted at the same time. The show always features a third, female call-in host; eight different women appeared in that role throughout the show's run. There is typically a celebrity guest as well, usually an actor or musician. Together, the group takes questions from, and offers advice to, teenagers and young adults on subjects including sex, relationships and drug use.

Loveline was produced by Stone Stanley Productions, and was distributed by Westwood One.

The show's female co-hosts were:

- Kris McGaha (1996–1997)
- Laura Kightlinger (1997)
- Lou Thornton (1997)
- Carmen Electra (1997)
- Idalis DeLeon (1997)
- Diane Farr (1998)
- Catherine McCord (1999–2000)
- Donna D'Errico (Loveline: Live in Times Square) (2000)
- Sasha Alexander (2001)
