= Jim Ladd =

American disc jockey (1948–2023)

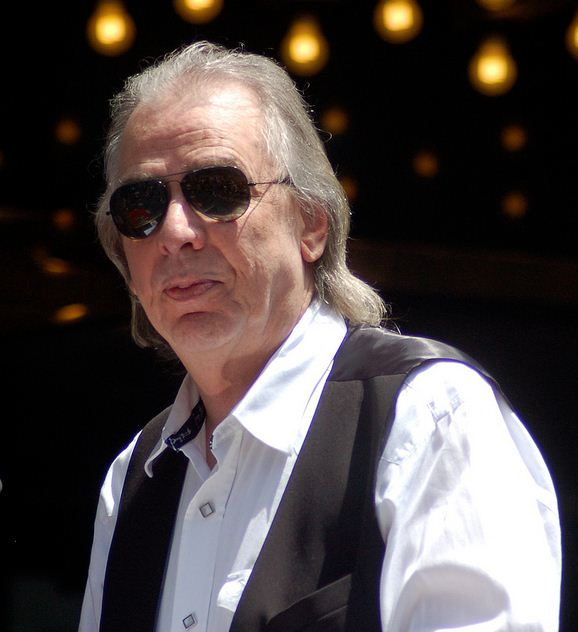
- Ladd in 2012
- Born: James William Ladd; January 17, 1948; Lynwood, California, U.S.
- Died: December 17, 2023 (aged 75); Carmichael, California, U.S.
- Occupations: Disc jockey; radio personality; writer
- Spouse: Helene Hodge
- Website: jimladdrocks.com

James William Ladd (January 17, 1948 – December 17, 2023) was an American disc jockey (DJ), radio producer and writer. He was one of the last notable remaining free-form rock DJs in United States commercial radio.

Ladd first gained national prominence as host of the hour long nationally syndicated radio program Innerview, which aired weekly on over 160 stations nationwide for twelve years.

== Biography ==
=== Early years and KMET ===
Ladd began his career in 1969 at KNAC, a small Long Beach rock station. After two years there, he moved to Los Angeles station KLOS. In 1974 he moved to KMET, known to its legions of listeners as "The Mighty Met", where he would remain for most of the next 13 years (returning to KLOS in 1984, but going back to KMET again, 2 months before they changed format), while also hosting and producing Innerview, an hour-long nationally syndicated interview program that aired during the same period.

After what many listeners and people in the industry perceived as a long steady decline in the station's output, attributed by most accounts to the station's decision to bring in consultant Lee Abrams and the strict "album-oriented rock" formatting he favored, KMET management shocked southern California and all of radio by abruptly dumping rock music, the call letters, and the entire air staff on February 14, 1987, becoming KTWV ("The Wave"), featuring a new age format with no DJs at all.

=== Jumping station to station, and side projects ===
In 1987, Ladd appeared on Pink Floyd bassist Roger Waters' second solo album Radio K.A.O.S., portraying a fictional disk jockey named DJ Jim who talks to the album's protagonist, a handicapped boy named Billy. Ladd joined Waters on the tour that followed, and appeared in the three music videos for the album. Ladd also played an all-night DJ in Cameron Crowe's 1989 film Say Anything.... Ladd's work has also been featured in major motion pictures such as Tequila Sunrise, Rush, She's Out of Control, and Defendor starring Woody Harrelson.

For several years, Ladd worked only on-and-off on the radio because he refused to follow a playlist, as most station owners demanded. In the late 1980s, Ladd worked at KMPC-FM, where he helped to shape its "Full Spectrum Rock" blend of classic and modern rock and was enthusiastic about its rebranding as KEDG "the Edge" in March 1989. However, Ladd was laid off when the station abruptly abandoned its rock format two months later.

In 1991 Ladd released a semi-autobiographical book titled Radio Waves: Life And Revolution On The FM Dial (St. Martin's Press), based on his radio career and the rise and fall of freeform rock radio in LA, from the genesis of freeform on the West Coast through the demise of KMET in 1987. The names of many people and radio stations Ladd encountered during that two-decade period were swapped for pseudonyms; however, Raechel Donahue has said that she insisted Ladd use her real name and that of her late husband Tom Donahue in the book. David Perry, Ace Young, Jack Snyder, Damion, and the late personalities B. Mitchel Reed and J. J. Jackson, were also among those identified by their actual "air names".

That same year, Ladd was hired by KLSX. In July 1995, Ladd and the entire KLSX staff were summarily fired as the station abruptly changed its format to talk radio.

=== Free-form show on KLOS and the internet ===
Ladd and his free-form rock music returned to KLOS in 1997 and aired until October 26, 2011, Monday thru Thursday from 10PM to 2AM (PDT) and on Sunday from 9PM to Midnight. His show routinely led its time slot in Arbitron ratings. KLOS renewed his contract in January 2007. In addition, he produced, wrote, and narrated a number of nationally syndicated programs, including interviews, concert specials and album premieres.

Later, Ladd used his MySpace and Facebook pages to interact with his listeners, whom he referred to as "The Tribe." He often took requests in the comments section and used the site as a source to promote free form radio. Beginning March 10, 2008, Ladd's show was streamed on KLOS's web site.

On October 26, 2011, Ladd was among various staffers fired from KLOS following the acquisition of station owner Citadel Broadcasting by Cumulus Media.

On November 5, 2011, Ladd gave a three-hour farewell broadcast on AM station KFI in Los Angeles.

=== Sirius XM ===
On December 2, 2011, Sirius XM Radio announced that Jim Ladd would host a live, daily free-form music show on Deep Tracks, channel 27 (now 308). This show ran from January 2012 to December 2023.

=== Hollywood Walk of Fame ===
On May 6, 2005, Ladd received a star on the Hollywood Walk of Fame in recognition of the first 38 years of his groundbreaking radio career at 7018 Hollywood Boulevard. Friend Jackson Browne made a speech.

=== Personal life and death ===
Ladd was married to writer, poet and musician Helene Hodge. He died of a heart attack on December 17, 2023, at the age of 75.
