= Raechel Donahue =

Raechel Donahue is a rock radio pioneer generally associated with her husband Tom Donahue, who died in 1975. She was the original entertainment reporter for CNN, briefly served as VJ for the short-lived Cable Music Channel and a longtime radio personality in San Francisco on KSAN and in Los Angeles on KMET, KROQ-FM, KIIS-FM, and in 2006 was heard on SIRIUS Satellite Radio (SIRIUS), Classic Vinyl and Sirus Gold.

== Background ==
In 2009 she had a daily audio blog on the All Star Radio Network called Brush With Fame and a weekend show on the Dial-Global Radio Network and broadcast daily on Boss Boss Radio for seven years Author, journalist and voiceover artist for film, television and commercials, she is featured in the Rock and Roll Hall of Fame main hall and in The Paley Center for Media. She was honored by the latter in both the New York and Los Angeles exhibitions entitled She Made It: Women Creating Television and Radio. She is also a major figure (along with husband Tom) in Jim Ladd's semi-biographical account of the history of KMET, "Radio Waves: Life and Revolution on the FM Dial". Currently, Raechel works as a documentary film maker; "Airplay", was released in the summer of 2007 and she wrote, produced, and directed "Drawn to Yellowstone" for Wyoming PBS in 2009 and the self-produced documentary about World War II Japanese internment camps, "Heart Mountain: An All American Town," was played on public television stations across America and in 175 countries and territories by the Armed Forces Network. Donahue has written hundreds of articles about travel and food for USAToday.com, eHow, AZCentral and other publications. Raechel's books include Fabulous After Fifty, The Golden Rules of Modern Romance, The Golden Rules for Polite Society, and The Venetian Duck, all listed on Amazon.
