= Larry Scott (radio personality) =

American country music disc jockey

Larry Scott (September 27, 1938 – July 10, 2016) was an American country music disc jockey who hosted a number of country music shows in the U.S.

First announcing on a radio station in Neosho, Missouri in 1955, Larry received a call from Al Brumley, originally from Powell, Missouri. Al and his brother, Tom, were in Bakersfield, California, playing country music. Al told Larry that if he ever wanted to be anybody in country music he needed to get out there. Larry packed his bags and headed West. He went to work for Cousin Herb Henson at KUZZ. He was there when it all happened, the Bakersfield Sound. He had an air shift at a KUZZ television show, produced Barbara Mandrell's first 45, plus making lifelong friends with Buck Owens, Merle Haggard, Bill Woods, and the other greats of Bakersfield music scene. Scott later moved to Los Angeles where he worked at radio stations KBBQ and KLAC from 1967 to 1982.

During his time in Los Angeles, his boss and dear friend, Bill Ward, knew the talent, but wanted him to gain more experience, KVEG, Las Vegas and WiL. St. Louis. Then he returned to Los Angeles. Bill and Larry had met in Dallas at a Gordon McLendon station. They were the first all country Station. Larry did the night shift, Bill was daytime. Larry still had his old California friends and knew about country music going to Los Angeles. He asked Bill if he wanted to go to California. They left Dallas for Burbank and KBBQ.

Next stop KFDI, Wichita, Kansas 1975 as program director and on-air personality. During this venture. Larry's love for Bob Wills and The Texas Playboys revived. They were in contact with Leon McAuliffe and Smoky Dacus in Arkansas. The band members were playing single dates. It was Larry and Mike's efforts with the assistance and permission of Betty Wills, assistance of Smoky and Leon to book them again as Bob Wills' Texas Playboys. They booked them for the Cotillion Ballroom in Wichita, Kansas. PACKED and SRO.

1977, Phoenix, AZ, KNIX

1979, Dallas, TX KRLD

1980, KLAC

1981, KWKH Shreveport, LA.

Born in Modesto, California, Scott was noted in country music circles for hosting The Interstate Road Show which aired overnight on KWKH from Shreveport, Louisiana and on KVOO (now KOTV) in Tulsa, Oklahoma. The show involved a mix of country music, news, vital weather reports and road conditions for truckers that were on the road. Mr. Scott is also known as a devotee of Western swing music and hosted Western Swing revival shows across the Southwestern United States. The most recent show honoring this genre occurred in Wichita Falls, Texas in 2006.

He was Entertainment Director for The Lincoln County Cowboy Symposium. Ruidoso, New Mexico, 25 years, booking the greats of Western Swing, with The Playboys featured and honored for 3 nights. Sold out crowds for 4 days and 3 nights.

Larry Scott also released an album of truck driving songs for Alshire Records in 1972 titled Keep On Truckin' (A/S). One song on the LP, "Phantom 570," alluded to his Phantom 570 truckers' show in which he played host on KLAC (570) radio in Los Angeles. A popular track from the album was "Diesel Cecil."

Larry Scott was retired from the radio business for a time and ran a trucking service out of Terrell, Texas. He returned to Shreveport to host several one-hour shows on KWKH on Sunday mornings until KWKH instituted a format change to sports talk in May 2012.

Larry Scott received the Deejay of the Year 1981 from the Country Music Association and from the Academy of Country Music Disc Jockey of the Year (1971, 72) and Radio Personality (1968, 74). Larry is also an inductee into the Texas Gospel Music Hall of Fame. Other awards include:

- Academy of Western Artists - Disc Jockey 1999
- Founding member, Southern Gospel Music Association. Memphis, TN
- Emceed Albert E Brumley SunDown to SunUp Gospel Singing, Springdale AR. 25+ years.

Larry Scott died in Oak Ridge, Kaufman County, Texas 2 1/2 months before his 78th birthday.

== Sources ==
- Classic country sound in full swing Tulsa World, December 13, 1999
- The King Of Swing Bob Wills Crossed the Border and Put His Playboys On the Map Tulsa World, August 24, 1997
- State dance festival slated Wichita Falls Times Record News, June 4, 2006
- Academy of Country Music Website, July 11, 2016
- Texas Gospel Music Hall of Fame and Museum, July 11, 2016
- Academy of Western Artists, July 11, 2016
