= Kris McGaha =

American actress and comedian (born 1966)

- Born: February 6, 1966; Oswego, New York
- Died: September 4, 2026 (aged 60)

Kris McGaha (February 6, 1966 – September 4, 2026) was an American actress, comedian, and television program hostess. McGaha appeared on MTV's Loveline television show, co-hosting with Adam Carolla and Dr. Drew Pinsky.

== Biography ==
McGaha started her career at 16 as a performer and stand-up comedian at Houston's Comedy Workshop. Her big break came with co-hosting 65 episodes of MTV's Loveline. In addition to hosting, she did sketch work on The Tonight Show with Jay Leno, Later, and guest-starred on Curb Your Enthusiasm. She also appeared on various hidden camera shows, including Invasion of Hidden Cameras, Spy TV and a hidden-camera segment (relating to "dihydrogen monoxide") on Penn & Teller: Bullshit!

McGaha died on September 4, 2026 of a brain tumor.

== Filmography ==
=== Films ===
Year	Film	Role	Director	Notes
1991	Rush	Yellow Rose Tequila Shot Girl	Lili Fini Zanuck	Uncredited
1998	The Curve	Renee	Dan Rosen	
2000	Radio Free Steve	Ragina	Jules Beesley and Lars von Biers	
2002	Following Tildy	Tildy St. John	Jonathan Schmock	Short film
2002	Strippers Pole	Host	Mike Rotman	Short film
2003	Oh So Twisted	Reporter	Dave Schulz	Short film
2004	Nobody's Perfect		Hank Azaria	Short film
2012	Janeane from Des Moines	Tea Party Speaker #2	Grace Lee	Short film
2012	I Can't Find a Toy for My Baby	Mom	Eban Schletter	Short film
2025	Asteria	Aurelia	Eban Schletter	

=== Television ===
Year(s)	Title	Role(s)	Notes
1995	The L.A. Thing with John Doe	Self	
1996	Night Stand with Dick Dietrick	Rene Sayer	S1E50 "Is Bigger Better?"
1996–1997	Loveline	Self (co-host)	65 episodes
1997	HBO Comedy Showcase	Self (comedian)	
2000	Now or Never, Face Your Fears	Self (co-host)	Television special
2000	Curb Your Enthusiasm	Diane Keaton's Assistant	S1E5 "Interior Decorator"
2001	The Test	Self (panelist)	S1E34 "The Sex Fiend Test"
2001	Spy TV	John Grey's Mistress	S1E5
2001	Unreal TV	Janice Reynolds; Stripper on Smack	Television special
2001	The Tonight Show with Jay Leno	"Excess Hollywood" Correspondent	
2001	A Day in Their Lives: Iron Workers	Iron Worker's Wife	TV movie
2002	O2Be	Trading Trailers Host	S1E1 "O2Be"
2002	Invasion of the Hidden Cameras	Self	Main role
2003	Ask Rita	Self	Episodes dated February 26 and November 4, 2003
2003	Penn & Teller: Bullshit!	H2O Petitioner	S1E13 "Environmental Hysteria"
2003	UFOs: Put to the Test	Mole	TV movie
2003	Monsters: Put to the Test	Various roles	TV movie
2004–2005	9 on the Town	Self (co-host)	7 episodes
2006	Dirty Jobs	Self	S2E22 "100th Dirty Job Special"
2007	Wildest Court Show Moments	Self	Television special
2012–2014	Parental Discretion with Stefanie Wilder-Taylor	Self	4 episodes
2013–2015	Comedy Bang! Bang!	Vocalist	S2E10 "Casey Wilson Wears a White Lace Dress & a Black Blazer"; S4E14 "Lil Jon Wears a Baseball Cap and Sunglasses"
2014	The Birthday Boys	Band Vocalist	S2E1 "Snobs and Slobs"
