= Jim Trenton =

American radio broadcaster

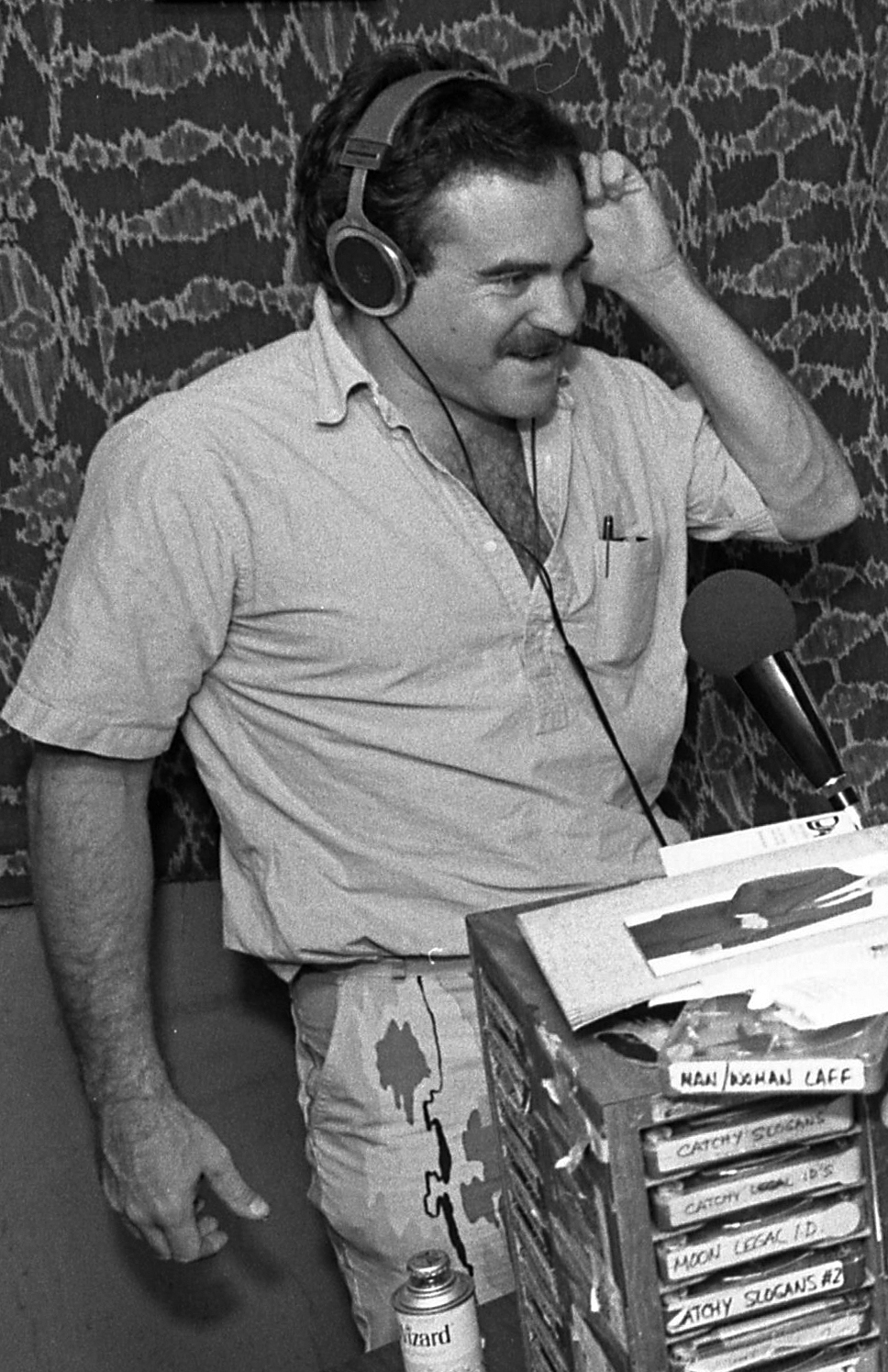
- Trenton in 1985
- Born: James Trenton
- Other name: The Poorman
- Occupations: Radio broadcaster, actor, author

James Trenton, nicknamed "the Poorman", is an American radio broadcaster. He is best known as the creator and host of Loveline on KROQ-FM in Los Angeles from 1983 to 1993. He currently hosts a morning radio program on KOCI 101.5 FM, a station located in south Orange County, California. "Poorman's Morning Rush" is also now in 4 markets. Three shows are taped daily M-F (KBSZ, KZFX, KLUK) and KOCI is live five days a week.

== Career in radio ==
Trenton began his entertainment career in the mid-80s on then underground alternative radio station KROQ-FM in Los Angeles. During the following decade, he created and hosted the popular nighttime show Loveline, co-hosted the KROQ morning show, and appeared on Oprah.

=== Early years ===
Under "The Poorman" moniker, Trenton wrote and self-published two guidebooks about dining in the Los Angeles area on a budget. In May 1981, Trenton broadcast his first of several reviews of inexpensive restaurants on KROQ.

Trenton continued as the local surf reporter and went on to co-host the KROQ morning show with Richard Blade. From there, he became one of the station's most popular figures, when he created Loveline.

=== Loveline ===
Trenton created Loveline in 1983 as a Sunday night dating and relationships segment on Los Angeles radio station KROQ, hosted by Trenton, DJ Swedish Egil (Egil Aalvik), and Scott Mason. It began as a serious "public service" segment hosted by Mason, but Trenton revamped the format to a hybrid of advice and comedy. As Trenton found himself unable to answer serious medical questions related to sexual issues, he added a segment called "Ask a Surgeon," and later "On Call with Dr. Drew," hosted by his friend Drew Pinsky, who at the time, was a fourth-year medical student at the University of Southern California. This format became a fast hit for KROQ, catapulting Trenton and Drew to celebrity.

On August 20, 1993, Trenton was a victim of a prank played by morning DJ Gene "Bean" Baxter, where Bean had an assistant walk into Trenton's unlocked house—while he was sleeping—to "celebrate" Trenton's 40th birthday. In response, Trenton organized approximately 500 listeners to gather on the front lawn of Bean's house at midnight, to have their own celebration. Bean complained to the station's management, which responded by terminating Trenton's employment. That month, he was replaced on Loveline by former MTV VJ Riki Rachtman.

Loveline continued without Trenton, eventually becoming syndicated, and spawning a television version which ran on MTV for a number of years.

=== Other radio work ===
From 1994 through 2004, Trenton worked at several Los Angeles-area radio stations. After departing KROQ, Trenton hosted shows on GrooveRadio (103.1), KIIS-FM (102.7), KPWR-FM (105.9), and twice at KYSR-FM (98.7).

Later in 2001, Poorman joined the Rick Dees in the Morning Show on KIIS-FM Los Angeles as Rick Dees' sidekick through 2004, until Dees was replaced by Ryan Seacrest. Trenton became the only on-air talent in Los Angeles radio history to work at all three Los Angeles new music giants: KROQ, POWER 106, and KIIS.

==== KCAA and Poorman's Nation ====
In late 2010, Trenton began one of various stints on the pay-your-own-way broadcast station KCAA, based out of San Bernardino, California. While most hosts on the station pay hourly to host their own vanity programs, Poorman was given a free air slot, and had an agreement with station ownership to split the revenue from any advertising sold. The show "Poorman's Radio Invasion", ended after about a year, at which point he moved to New York to prepare for his new syndicated program.

On October 10, 2011, Trenton began his syndicated show, called Poorman's Nation. Despite originally being promoted as a live call-in show, Poorman's Nation instead consisted solely of taped interviews from Occupy Wall Street. The program was syndicated by the Genesis Communications Network, and produced by Mike Lundgren with KCAA, which carried his original Radio Invasion program earlier in the year. Trenton conducted his on-the-street interviews while wearing only a Depression-era-style barrel, which earned him some degree of media attention, including an appearance on The Young Turks. However, the show failed to pick up any additional affiliates or local sponsors, and was canceled by the syndicator on November 7, 2011.

Trenton returned to KCAA twice from 2012 to 2015, with neither show lasting more than nine months.

=== Host ===
While working at KROQ in the mid-1980s, local Orange County TV station KDOC had a program called Adventures with the Poorman hosted by Trenton.

In the late 1980s, Trenton hosted a show on KDOC called Request Video. This was a live show featuring videos of primarily rock and independent bands. In addition, Trenton took live phone calls and interviewed bands. His show was the first to interview the then-unknown Gwen Stefani and her band No Doubt.

=== The Love Channel and Poorman's Bikini Beach ===
In 1994, Trenton launched a live, late-night call-in TV advice show called The Love Channel on KDOC. He co-hosted the show with “Dr. Danielle” Ardolino, a UCLA Medical School graduate who was then completing her residency at the UC Irvine Medical Center. The show featured a mix of advice to callers, celebrity interviews and band performances. The show attempted to replicate the success of Loveline, but it was ultimately canceled. In 1999, Trenton again returned to the television landscape, producing a program called Poorman's Bikini Beach. Like The Love Channel, Poorman owned and controlled the show, renting airtime from various television stations. It ran subsequent years, on various television stations including the Los Angeles station KJLA.

Trenton canceled the program on January 17, 2011, to pursue other career opportunities in New York.

=== KOCI ===
In 2019, Trenton began hosting a morning drive-time radio program, Poorman’s Morning Rush, on KOCI-FM 101.5, "The Low Power Blowtorch" broadcasting from Costa Mesa, California.

=== KLIE ===
Trenton also simulcasts his morning show, Poorman’s Morning Rush, on KLIE-LP 90.3 FM, another local station based in Garden Grove, California and broadcasting out of Fountain Valley, California. The station is also known by its more popular name, Radio Suerte, where it is the first bilingual station run by both Maria Luisa Luna and Victor Mendez.

== Appearances and stints ==
Trenton worked as a field reporter on KTTV's Good Day LA and the Los Angeles UPN station's news program.

He appeared as an extra on the program Boardwalk Empire, which aired in October 2012.

In 2014, Trenton appeared on episode two of Frankenfood on Spike TV. His creation, the Nuclear Torpedo, also called a "Poor Man's Giant Garbage Burrito" was panned by all three judges. Host Tony Luke, Jr. bet $100 that a dog would not eat Trenton's giant burrito, and, in fact, the dog refused to eat Trenton's creation.

Trenton has also appeared in four films, including the 1987 B movie North Shore as the opening surf contest announcer, the 1988 hit Heathers (as the 'Hot Probs' D.J.) and the 1990 film Men at Work (as the narrator). He also appeared alongside Nick Offerman in the music video for the song "The Greatest" by They Might Be Giants.

Trenton is a member of SAG/AFTRA.

== Personal life ==
Trenton completed law school while in his 20s, but did not pass the California State Bar exam. This occurred before he got involved in radio.

Trenton is also a photographer, and has exhibited his work at various art galleries throughout California including The Gray Matter of Art Gallery.

Trenton is married to long time girlfriend, Aime McCrory.
