= Durand Express =

The Durand Express was a weekly newspaper published in Durand, Michigan from 1888 until 2003.

It was owned by a number of different individuals until being sold to the Argus-Press of Owosso, Michigan.

It is known for Its 1983 April Fools edition where it reported that "dihydrogen oxide" (Water) had been found in the city's pipes, and warned that it was fatal if inhaled and could produce blistering vapors.
