= George Taylor Morris =

American disc jockey and radio personality

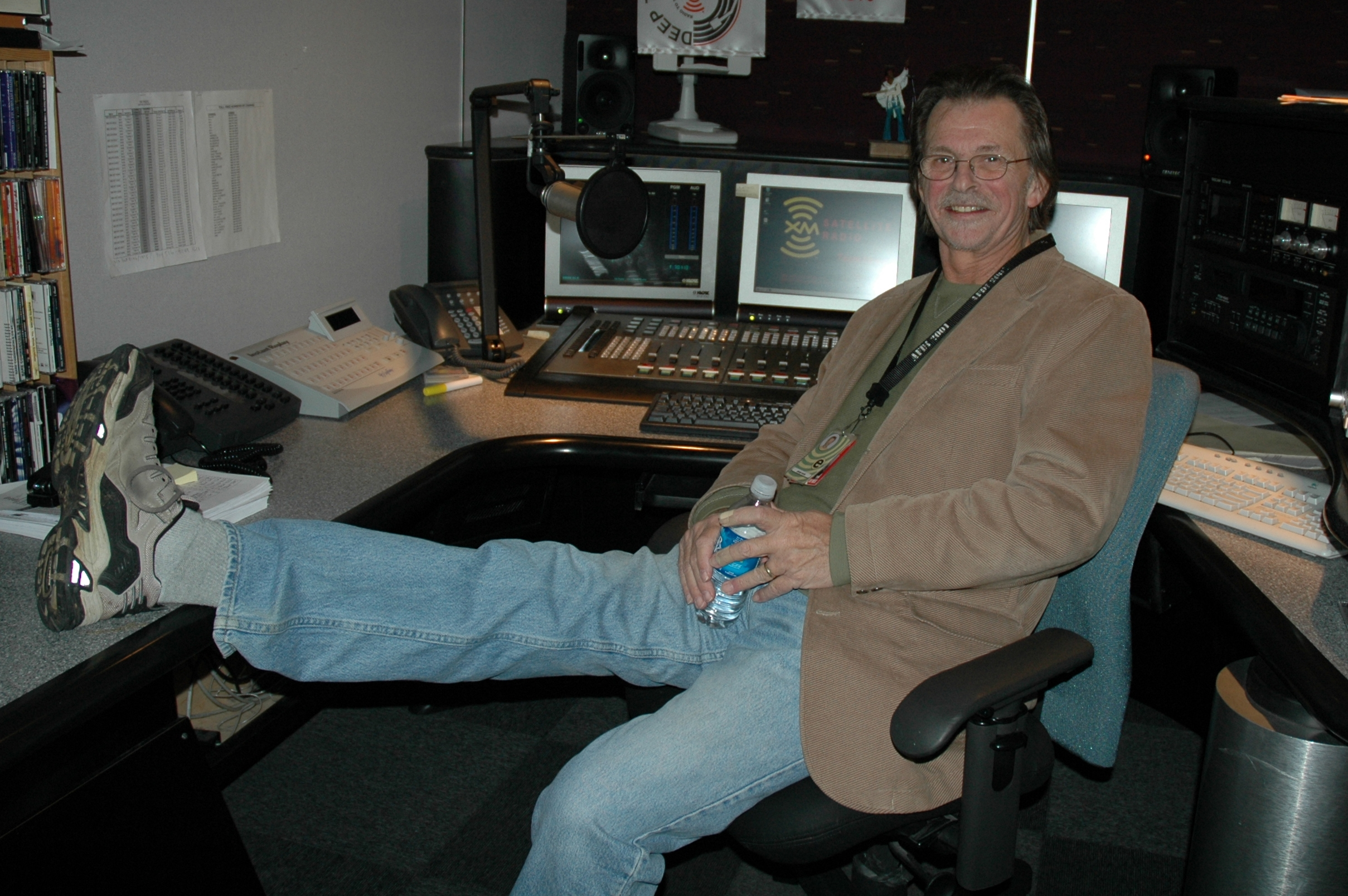
- Born: George Taylor Morris; May 10, 1947; King City, California, U.S.
- Died: August 1, 2009 (aged 62); Reston, Virginia, United States
- Occupations: Radio personality, disc jockey
- Spouse: Gail Markens Morris
- Children: Evan Markens Morris

George Taylor Morris (May 10, 1947 – August 1, 2009) was an American disc jockey and radio personality who grew up with and on the radio. Initially working on AM radio, then switching to the FM radio format, Morris' career evolved to where he became a "founding father of satellite radio at Sirius XM", according to the station. After working at a number of radio stations, he received media attention in the late 1990s when he popularized the "Dark Side of the Rainbow" phenomenon, in which the 1973 Pink Floyd album The Dark Side of the Moon is said to be synchronized with the images in the 1939 film The Wizard of Oz. Morris was the morning host of the Deep Tracks classic rock channel on XM Satellite Radio and was a host on its interview show XM Artist Confidential.

== Biography ==
Born in King City, California, Morris had his first job in radio at KRKC while a high school sophomore, in 1963. He worked as a radio host in Lake Tahoe, Nevada and Santa Barbara, California after high school graduation. Morris moved to New York's Long Island, where he was news director at WHLI and was an on-air personality at other area radio stations, including Top 40 WBLI and WWDJ, and progressive WLIR. He later worked at WHCN Hartford and WCOZ (now WJMN) Boston.

He worked at The Source radio network, starting as a news anchor in 1979, covering major news events and eventually becoming the network's entertainment director in 1981. From 1984 to 1999 he produced and hosted Reelin' in the Years, a syndicated Album-oriented rock show. From 1999 to 2000 George worked as an internet DJ and program manager for the defunct Discjockey.com an internet radio station that was closely aligned to Broadcast.com, the forerunner to Yahoo radio.

While at classic rock station WZLX in Boston in 1996, Morris became aware of some uncanny similarities between Pink Floyd's album The Dark Side of the Moon and the movie The Wizard of Oz, in which lyrics of the album's songs are related to events taking place on the screen when the movie and album are played at the same time. Some of the connections were said to include the song "Brain Damage" appearing in time with the Scarecrow singing "If I Only Had a Brain" and the heartbeat at the end of the song "Eclipse" coming at the same time that Dorothy is listening to the Tin Man's chest. Morris played the two simultaneously and found the first few minutes "kind of interesting", but saw "an amazing series of cosmic coincidences" once Dorothy enters the house. After mentioning the synchronicity on his radio show, the phenomenon became a media sensation, reported in major newspapers, on NPR and other outlets in the United States, several other countries including Japan, and MTV.

In 2001 Morris was hired by XM Satellite Radio as host of XM Artist Confidential, where he interviewed artists including Tony Bennett, Amy Grant, Ludacris, Paul McCartney, Willie Nelson, Odetta and Pink. Morris also served as program director and morning host of XM's classic rock channel Deep Tracks.

Morris died at age 62 on August 1, 2009, at his home in Reston, Virginia after struggling with throat cancer. He was survived by Gail Markens Morris, his second wife, and their son, Evan Markens Morris. His first marriage had ended in divorce.
