= KROQ (1500 AM) =

Radio station in Burbank, California (1952–1984)

- Burbank, California; United States
- Broadcast area: Los Angeles, California
- Frequency: 1500 kHz

Ownership
- Owner: Burbank Broadcasting Company

History
- First air date: June 21, 1952
- Last air date: July 26, 1984
- Former call signs: KBLA (1952–1967); KBBQ (1967–1972)
- Former frequencies: 1490 kHz (1952–1958)
- Call sign meaning: ROQ is pronounced "rock"

Technical information
- Facility ID: 57891
- Class: B
- Power: 10,000 watts (day); 1,000 watts (night)

KROQ (1500 AM) was a radio station licensed to Burbank, California, serving the Los Angeles metropolitan area. 1500 AM is a clear-channel frequency in the United States.

== History ==
=== KBLA ===
The station began broadcasting on June 21, 1952, with the call sign KBLA. It originally operated at 1490 kHz and transmitted at 250 watts.

In 1958, the owners obtained a construction permit to change frequency to 1500 kHz, with a power upgrade to 10,000 watts 24 hours a day. However, the station encountered several obstacles before completion. Hubbard Broadcasting's KSTP in St. Paul, Minnesota, contested the proposal based on interference that it believed would occur within its nighttime coverage area. The Glendale, California, city council and zoning board also rejected KBLA's proposed tower site. KBLA filed suit against Glendale and its mayor Cal Cannon, alleging that Cannon, who was general manager of KIEV, conspired to influence the zoning board to deny KBLA's permit. The station ended up operating at 1,000 watts at night using a directional array, protecting KSTP but shrinking the coverage area of the station. Its tower site was located in the Verdugo Mountains. The power increase and frequency change were completed on February 12, 1965.

In August 1964, the station began shifting to a contemporary hits format in anticipation of the power increase and frequency change. The station had been airing block programming. The Lawrence Welk Show aired mornings on the station until 1965. The initial personalities heard on KBLA during its contemporary hits period were Tom Duggan, Sid Wayne, Jim Wood, William (Rosko) Mercer, Tom Clay, and Dick "Huggy Boy" Hugg. The station became completely automated in July 1965, but live DJs were brought back in December, with hosts Harry Newman, Roger Christian, Harvey Miller (Humble Harve), Dave Diamond, Vic Gee (Jim Carson), and William F. Williams. By 1966, Emperor Bob Hudson, Bob Dayton, and Hal Pickens had joined the airstaff.

=== KBBQ ===
The small station could not compete with more established and powerful competition, after playing The End followed by the National Anthem, so they switched to country music as KBBQ in June 1967. DJs on KBBQ included Harry Newman, Bob Jackson, Vic Gee, Alan King, Bill Williams, and Larry Scott. To celebrate its first anniversary as a country station, KBBQ sponsored a country music show at Shrine Auditorium, which featured Merle Haggard, Bonnie Owens, Ferlin Husky, Sheb Wooley, Tex Williams, Jimmy Wakely, Freddie Hart, Jerry Wallace, and Jimmy Bryant. Station Owner since 1956, George E. Cameron, Jr. died of a heart attack on May 22, 1970.

=== KROQ ===
On September 2, 1972, the station's call sign was changed to KROQ, and it adopted a rock format as "The Rock (ROQ) of Los Angeles". Personalities on KROQ included Charlie Tuna, Sam Riddle, Jay Stevens, Steve Lundy, Jim Wood, and Jimmy Rabbitt.

On November 25, 1972, KROQ presented a concert at Los Angeles Memorial Coliseum, billed as "The Ultimate ROQ Concert/Festival", to benefit the Southern California Council of Free Clinics, which featured performances by Chuck Berry, Stevie Wonder, Frankie Valli and the Four Seasons, the Eagles, the Bee Gees, Sly & the Family Stone, and the Raspberries, among others.

In 1973, KROQ's owners bought KPPC-FM, and on November 12, it began simulcasting KROQ, with the new call sign KROQ-FM. Less than a year later, KROQ and KROQ-FM experienced financial difficulty, and owed employees over $73,000 in unpaid salaries and owed over $14,000 to the American Federation of Television and Radio Artists pension and welfare fund. In June 1974, program director Shadoe Stevens and night personality Dana Jones resigned; this was followed by the entire staff going on strike on July 29, shutting the stations down.

On June 10, 1976, the stations returned to the air because KROQ's authorization to remain off the air had expired, and its license was due to be revoked. Shortly thereafter, the station would begin presenting weekend concerts, primarily featuring punk rock bands. At the time, Rodney Bingenheimer was introducing many new and local bands, including the Ramones and the Runaways, on his Sunday night show.

In 1980, KROQ ended its simulcast with KROQ-FM and began airing a Spanish-language format. In 1982, the station's license renewal was denied by the FCC due to numerous violations by the station's owners. KROQ-FM's license renewal was also denied shortly thereafter. These rulings were appealed, and in a 1984 settlement the license of KROQ-FM was assigned to Ken Roberts, who owned a 49% stake in the stations, and Roberts was ordered to pay compensation to the other applicants for the FM frequency. However, KROQ's license had to be surrendered, and Royce International's application for a new station on the frequency was granted; Royce International was headed by KWOD (106.5 FM)-Sacramento owner Ed Stoltz.

This new station was never built and, after numerous extensions using both the KRCK and KIEV calls, the permit was canceled on February 12, 2013. On February 5, 2020, the FCC gave Schwab Multimedia LLC final approval for a new station on 1500. KWIF was to be based in Culver City and would broadcast from a transmitter and tower in Montecito Heights. The construction permit expired on April 13, 2020. On December 7, 2020, the FCC dismissed all applications for modifications to the construction permit, concluding that Schwab "had not submitted any evidence that it had tried to construct the station". Schwab appealed the FCC's decision. On March 6, 2023, an appeals court unanimously upheld the decision.

A travelers' information station broadcasts on 1500 AM, operated by the City of Beverly Hills.
