= Rick Carroll =

American radio executive

Rickey Floyd "Rick" Carroll (September 15, 1946 – July 10, 1989) was an American program director (PD) for influential radio station KROQ-FM in Los Angeles, California, United States, where he introduced the "ROQ of the Eighties" format. The format was synonymous with KROQ-FM and eventually developed into the modern rock format. Carroll spread this format to a number of radio markets across the United States either directly, as a radio consultant during the 1980s, or indirectly as stations adopted the KROQ-FM sound.

== Biography ==
Born in Contra Costa County, California, Rick Carroll began his radio career as an intern at KPOP, Roseville / Sacramento, California, continuing at KERS while attending California State University-Sacramento. His professional career included stints as consultant or programming director for various California radio stations, including KKDJ and KEZY before moving to KROQ-FM in 1978.

During the late 1970s and early 1980s, mainstream acts dominated rock radio via the Album Oriented Rock (AOR) format, leaving little opportunity for most new artists. Carroll's approach was to play music from the emerging new wave, punk and related genres while retaining a Top 40 presentation style and Top 40 rotations. Noted for his ability to pick breakout hits, Carroll guided songs to prominence via the "Hot Clock," a pie chart prescribing the music to be played during each portion of a disc jockey's air shift. His system also included a "Jock's Choice" at the end of each hour of programming, during which a DJ could play any song of his or her own choosing. The Jock's Choice became a vehicle for new artists such as Depeche Mode and Juluka to break into KROQ-FM's regular rotation.

Starting in 1983, Carroll consulted other radio stations where he implemented the Rock of the Eighties format, including 91X (San Diego, CA), KYYX (Seattle, WA), KPOP Roseville / (Sacramento, CA), WAAF (Boston, MA), WIFI (Philadelphia, PA), KQAK (San Francisco, CA), WRQC (Cleveland, OH) and WYDD (Pittsburgh, PA) among many others.

Carroll died of AIDS-related pneumonia on July 10, 1989.

Rick was inducted into the Rock Radio Hall of Fame in the "Legends of Rock Radio-Programming" category on 2014.
