= KPPC (AM) =

Radio station in Pasadena, California (1924–1996)

- Pasadena, California; United States
- Frequency: 1240 kHz

Ownership
- Owner: Douglas Broadcasting; (KPPC Radio, Inc.)

History
- First air date: December 25, 1924
- Last air date: April 19, 1996 (Note: Regular programming ended on this date; the station continued to solely transmit weekly church services through September 1, 1996.)
- Former call signs: KXPA (1996–1997); KBLV (1997) (Note: Neither call sign was ever used on air. The KXPA call letters were assigned after most regular programs were abandoned. The KBLV call letters were given to this facility in order to assign KXPA to a co-owned radio station in Bellevue, Washington.)
- Call sign meaning: Pasadena Presbyterian Church

Technical information
- Facility ID: 35491
- Class: C
- Power: 250 watts
- Transmitter coordinates: 34°08′47″N 118°08′21″W

KPPC was a radio station licensed to Pasadena, California, United States, broadcasting on 1240 kHz between 1924 and 1996. Operating as a limited-hours, low-power station for most of its history, it carried primarily Christian radio programming and was originally owned by the Pasadena Presbyterian Church. Toward the end of its existence, it also aired ethnic programs. KPPC also spawned KPPC-FM (106.7), which was an influential free form, progressive rock station in the late 1960s and early 1970s and went on to become KROQ-FM.

KPPC ceased broadcasting in 1996 after Douglas Broadcasting acquired the station to eliminate interference with co-owned KYPA on 1230 kHz.

== History ==
=== Early history and church ownership ===
The Pasadena Presbyterian Church received the license to build KPPC in January 1925, but the station had already gone on air on December 25, 1924, with Christmas services from the church. KPPC broadcast on 1310 kilohertz with 50 watts. In 1927, it was joined on the frequency by another station, KELW, which held the distinction of being the first radio station built in the San Fernando Valley. In General Order 40, it was reallocated to 1200 kHz, shared with San Bernardino's KFWC. That station had moved to San Bernardino from Upland in 1926, but relocated to Ontario for a brief time. In January 1930, the station moved again to 1210, shared with the San Bernardino station, which had changed its callsign to KFXM the preceding year (it today is KTIE 590). Further technical changes followed in 1931 when the station began using the antenna system of the former KPSN (the station of the Pasadena Star-News, next door to the church), and in 1936 when it began transmitting with 100 watts. NARBA reallocated KPPC and KFXM to 1240 kHz in 1941; the stations were just 10 kHz from KGFJ (1230 AM), a situation that prevented significant facility improvements for decades.

On June 13, 1944, KPPC was authorized to broadcast at limited time: Sunday nights from 6pm to midnight and Wednesdays from 7 p.m. to 11 p.m. These hours allowed it to broadcast Sunday services and the Wednesday prayer meeting and had already been in use for several years prior to formal authorization. It would eventually increase its broadcast hours to 23 hours a week by broadcasting 18 hours on Sundays and another five hours on Wednesdays.

A desire to broadcast additional programming, not possible on the 1240 AM frequency due to the technical constraints of additional stations, led the Pasadena Presbyterian Church to build an FM radio station, KPPC-FM 106.7, which began broadcasts April 23, 1962.

=== Freeform years ===
In 1967, the Pasadena Presbyterian Church sold KPPC AM/FM to Crosby-Avery Broadcasting for $310,000. The church had been attempting to sell the radio stations for a year; station manager Edgar Pierce said the church found commercial radio incompatible with the noncommercial nature of its other efforts. The church retained the right to broadcast services over the stations, and the stations also did limited simulcasting. Crosby-Avery—owned by Leon Crosby, a general manager of San Francisco's KMPX, a station that had just gone to a full-time rock format, and Lewis Avery, former partner in a national ad sales firm—turned KPPC-FM into an influential progressive rock station, using a format similar to KMPX.

A further ownership change came in 1969 when Crosby-Avery sold KPPC AM/FM and KMPX to the National Science Network for $1.2 million. Crosby used the funds to buy a then-silent San Francisco television station, KEMO-TV. National Science Network's management of the KPPC stations was turbulent, capped by an October 1971 mass firing of the air staff.

=== Universal Broadcasting ===
In 1971, Ludwig W. Frohlich, the owner of National Science Network, died. Two years later, KPPC AM and FM were split; the FM station went to a group of investors known as the Burbank Broadcasting Company (already owners of 1500 AM), while KPPC, Inc., owned by Howard and Miriam Warshaw and Marvin Kosofsky, bought the AM frequency which had to be divested. The new owners integrated KPPC, still broadcasting on limited hours on Sundays and Wednesdays, into a growing chain of stations carrying religious programs, including Arcadia, California's KMAX-FM 107.1.

KPPC got a major broadcast time upgrade in 1985, operating at nighttime only Monday through Saturday and all day on Sundays. The changes also, however, allowed upgrades for the other stations around KPPC on the dial, which in the long run impaired the station's signal. By this time, KPPC was primarily airing programming in Spanish, though Hindi-language shows also were broadcast on the station, along with the Pasadena Presbyterian Church service, which had aired continuously since the church owned the station. In 1990, the Star-News newspaper ordered KPPC to move from the towers on its building, resulting in the construction of a new AM transmitter site.

=== Closure ===
In late 1995, the adjacent-channel station on 1230, KGFJ, was sold to Douglas Broadcasting, which relaunched it as KYPA "Personal Achievement Radio" in February 1996. Initially considering a simulcast of KYPA's programming on KPPC but instead deciding to buy the license to take it dark, Douglas acquired 1240 AM for $825,000 in December 1995. Though the church proposed a lease agreement to take back the 1240 frequency, concerns over future applications and the interference to the station on 1230 doomed the idea. On April 19, 1996, the station aired its final regular program, a look back at more than 71 years of broadcasting. However, the church discovered it had six more months on its longstanding contract to broadcast church services on the 1240 frequency, and with the license still nominally active, the station went on air for one hour a week for Pasadena Presbyterian Church's services, with the final broadcast coming September 1, 1996. (It also still identified as KPPC, even though Douglas had given the station new KXPA call letters, matching KYPA and its Personal Achievement programming, on May 1, 1996. It would later transfer those call letters to its station in Bellevue, Washington, in a move that left the KPPC license's final call letters officially KBLV.)
