= Catherine McCord =

American model and hostess

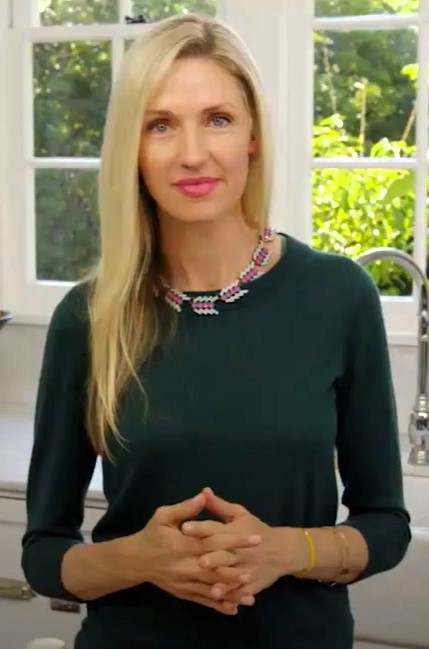
- McCord on The More You Know in 2019
- Born: Louisville, Kentucky
- Spouse: Jonathan Gordon
- Children: 3
- Modeling information
- Height: 1.80 m (5 ft 11 in)
- Hair color: Blonde
- Eye color: Blue/green
- Website: https://www.weelicious.com

Catherine McCord is an American CEO, Entrepreneur, former model, actress, and television program hostess. She is the founder of Weelicious, a website dedicated to helping parents expose their children to wholesome, delicious homemade food. She is also the co-founder of One Potato, an organic home meal delivery kit service, focused specifically on the mealtime needs of families, and the author of the cookbooks, Weelicious: One Family. One Meal. Weelicious Lunches: Think Outside the Lunchbox. and The Smoothie Project

McCord appears regularly on the Food Network's Guy's Grocery Games as a judge and has had guest spots on the Food Network's shows Next Food Network Star and Duff Till Dawn. She won the Guy's Grocery Games Delivery episode - Pantry-Palooza, beating Melissa D'Arabian and Troy Johnson, and won $17,000 for heart arrhythmia research.

== Biography ==
McCord was born in Louisville, Kentucky, and began modeling for Elite Model Management at the age of 14. She has appeared on the covers of Glamour and Elle magazines, and walked the runway for Donna Karan and Calvin Klein. From 1999 to 2000 she was the female co-host of the MTV show Loveline. FHM magazine readers voted her one of the sexiest women in the world for 2001.

McCord appeared in the films Stuck on You, starring Matt Damon; Derailed, starring Clive Owen and Jennifer Aniston and Gridiron Gang starring Dwayne "The Rock" Johnson. She also appeared on Two and a Half Men (2005).

She is a native of Louisville, Kentucky, and a graduate of Kentucky Country Day and the Institute of Culinary Education.

== Blogging ==
McCord in 2018

McCord owns and runs Weelicious.com, a website which "provides a solution to parents' hectic lives by showing them how to cook recipes that are kid-friendly, quick, and nutritious" with an aim on making "cooking accessible using few, but fresh ingredients." The site is updated daily with a new recipe or tip and includes a weekly how-to cooking video.

In August 2010, People voted McCord one of the 50 most influential "Mommy Bloggers." She has appeared multiple times in People, Self and Real Simple Magazine, on the Today Show, The Chew, Access Hollywood Live and Good Morning America. She is a regular contributor to People.com, Baby Center, Lilsugar.com, and Goodbite.com.

== Personal life ==
McCord is married to Jonathan Gordon and has three children: Kenya Gordon, Chloe Jade Gordon, and Gemma Gordon

== Bibliography ==
- McCord, Catherine (September 18, 2012). Weelicious: 140 Fast, Fresh, and Easy Recipes. William Morrow Cookbooks. ISBN 978-0062078445.
- McCord, Catherine (September 3, 2013). Weelicious Lunches: Think Outside the Lunch Box with More Than 160 Happier Meals. William Morrow Cookbooks. ISBN 978-0062078452.
