= The Dark Side of the Rainbow =

Pairing of Pink Floyd and The Wizard of Oz

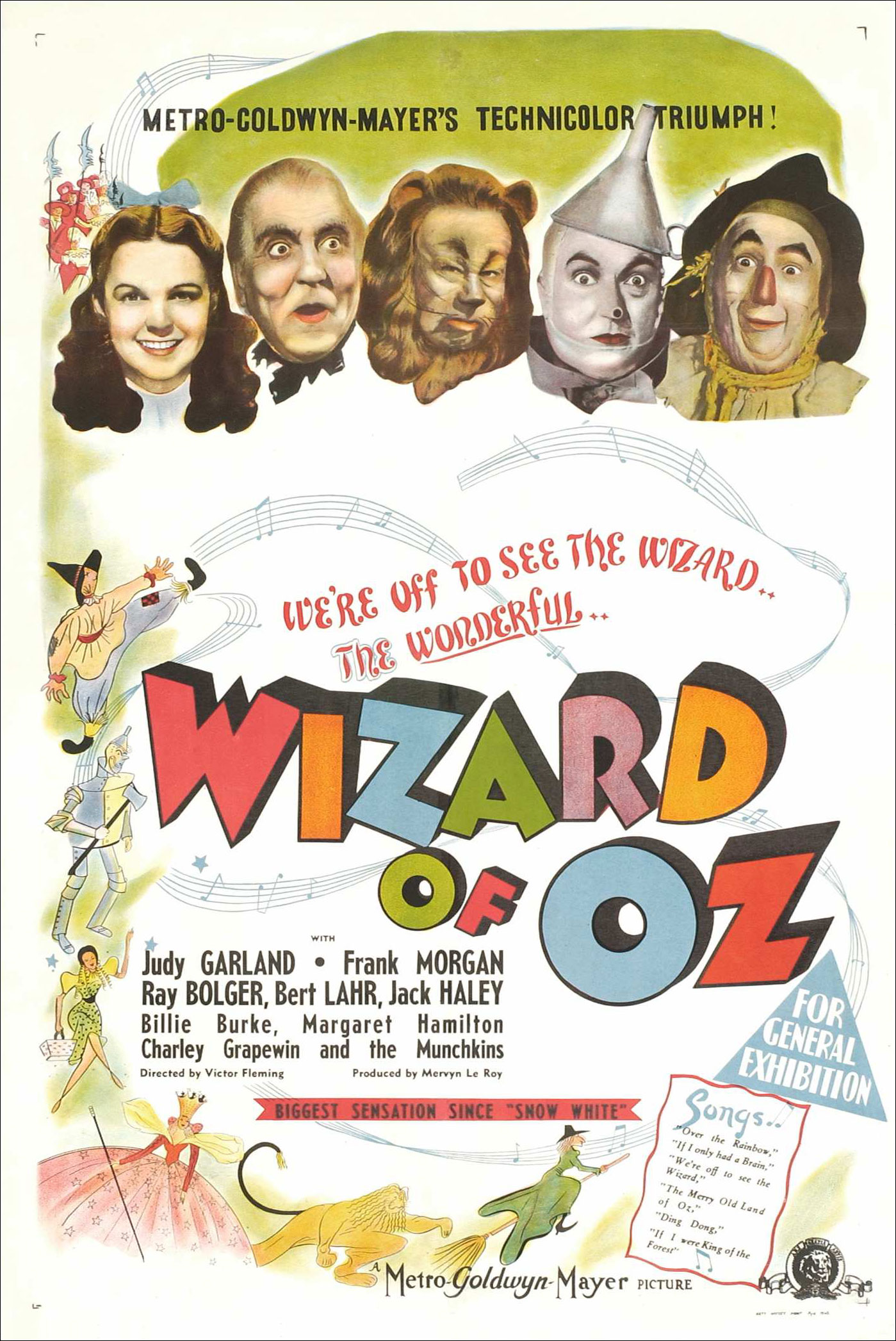
Pink Floyd's 1973 album The Dark Side of the Moon and the 1939 film The Wizard of Oz, which fans synchronize to create the "Dark Side of the Rainbow" experience

The Dark Side of the Rainbow—also known as Dark Side of Oz or The Wizard of Floyd—is the pairing of the 1973 Pink Floyd album The Dark Side of the Moon with the 1939 film The Wizard of Oz. This produces moments of apparent synchronicity where the film and album appear to correspond.

Members of Pink Floyd and the Dark Side of the Moon engineer Alan Parsons denied any intent to connect the album to the film. Detractors argue that the phenomenon is the result of the mind's tendency to find patterns by discarding data that does not fit.

== History ==
In August 1995, the Fort Wayne Journal Gazette published an article by Charles Savage suggesting that readers watch the 1939 film The Wizard of Oz while listening to the 1973 Pink Floyd album The Dark Side of the Moon. Savage said the idea was first shared on an online Pink Floyd newsgroup. According to Savage, if listeners start the album as the MGM lion roars, "The result is astonishing. It's as if the movie were one long art-film music video for the album. Song lyrics and titles match the action and plot. The music swells and falls with character's movements ... expect to see enough firm coincidences to make you wonder whether the whole thing was planned." In his 1995 article, Savage favoured starting at the lion's first roar, but he acknowledged in 2023 that the third roar had by then become the usual start point.

Instances of synchronicity include the lyric "balanced on the biggest wave" aligning with Dorothy's tightrope walk; the lyric "No one told you when to run" aligning with Dorothy running away from home; the rising and falling intensity of "The Great Gig in the Sky" aligning with the tornado scene; "Brain Damage" aligning with the Scarecrow, who has no brain; and the album's closing heartbeat playing as Dorothy listens to the Tin Woodman's chest.

Fans created websites about the experience and catalogued moments of synchronicity. In April 1997, the DJ George Taylor Morris discussed "Dark Side of the Rainbow" on Boston radio. In July 2000, Turner Classic Movies aired The Wizard of Oz with the option of synchronising the broadcast to the album using the SAP audio channel. Numerous venues have staged Dark Side of the Rainbow shows, where the film is projected while either a recording of the album is played or else a jam band or Pink Floyd tribute act covers it live; for example, Moe's 2000 New Year's Eve show at the Tower Theater in Upper Darby, Pennsylvania.

== Response ==
Members of Pink Floyd have denied any connection between the album and the film. The guitarist, David Gilmour, dismissed it as the product of "some guy with too much time on his hands". The bassist, Roger Waters, said it was "bullshit" with no connection to anyone who worked on the album. The Dark Side of the Moon engineer, Alan Parsons, also denied any connection, saying the band had no means of playing video tapes in the studio at the time of recording. He said he was disappointed by the results when he tried watching the film while listening to the album, and that "if you play any record with the sound turned down on the TV, you will find things that work". The drummer, Nick Mason, said: "It's absolute nonsense. It has nothing to do with The Wizard of Oz. It was all based on The Sound of Music."

Detractors argue that the phenomenon is the result of apophenia. The film critic Richard Roeper concluded that while Pink Floyd may have had the resources and technical abilities to produce an alternative film soundtrack, it would have been impractical, and noted that The Dark Side of the Moon is approximately an hour shorter than The Wizard of Oz.

== See also ==
- Apophenia – Tendency to perceive connections between unrelated things
- Lincoln–Kennedy coincidences urban legend
- Pareidolia – Perception of meaningful patterns or images in random or vague stimuli
