= Riki Rachtman =

American television and radio personality

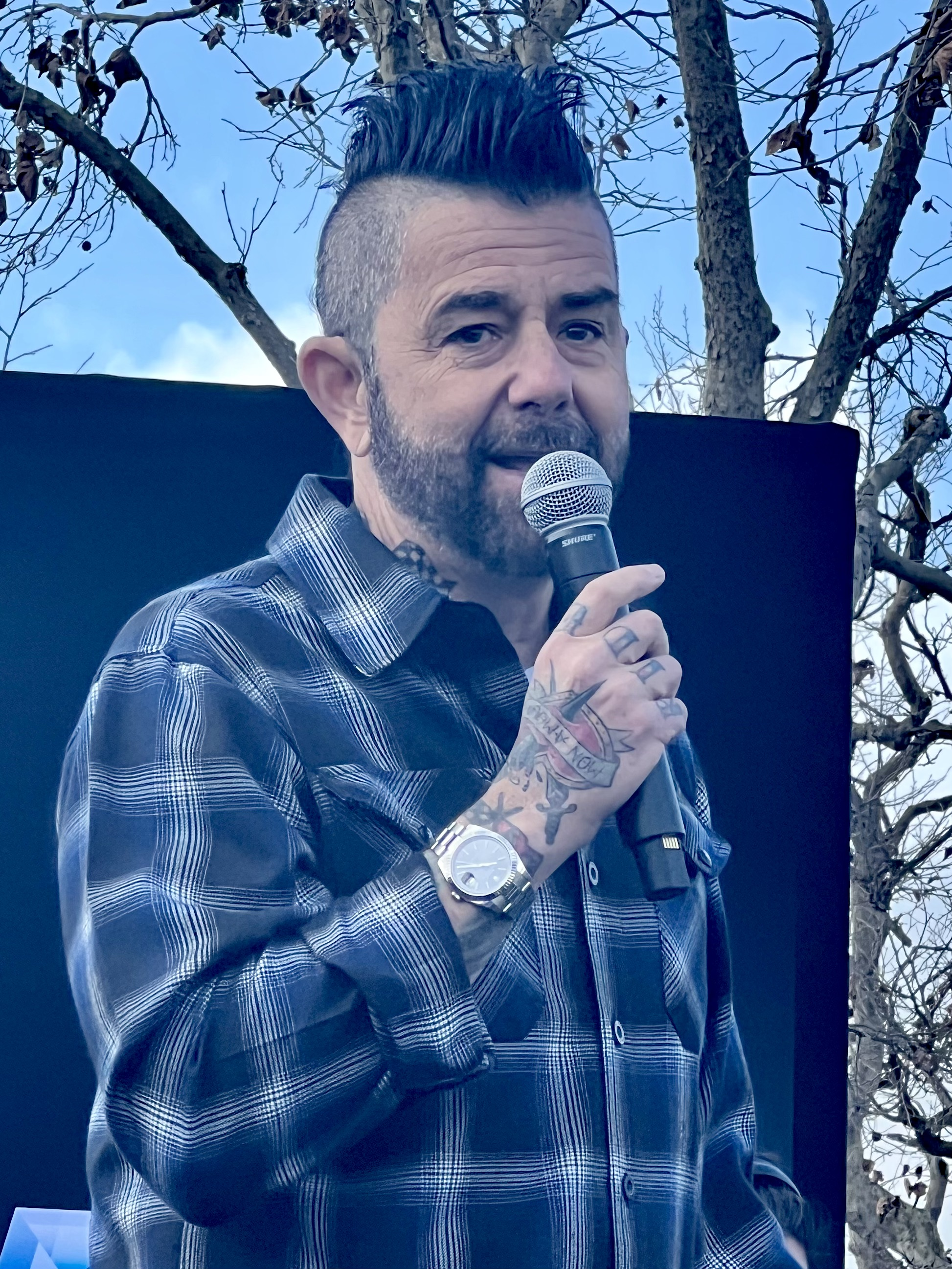
- Rachtman at the Los Angeles Memorial Coliseum in 2023
- Born: June 15, 1965 (age 61); Van Nuys, Los Angeles, California, U.S.
- Occupations: Television and radio personality
- Known for: Host of Headbangers Ball

David Andrew "Riki" Rachtman is an American television and radio personality. He is best known for his association with the late 1980s and early-to-mid 1990s hard rock and heavy metal scene, hosting MTV's Headbangers Ball from 1990 to the show's cancellation in 1995, and he was the owner of the Hollywood-based nightclub The Cathouse.

== Career ==
=== Rock scene ===
Riki Rachtman grew up in Van Nuys, California but later moved to the Hollywood Hills. At the age of 16, Rachtman auditioned to sing in the band the Angry Samoans, and the next year he was in a band called the Fairlanes. In the late 1980s, Rachtman was lead vocalist of the L.A. metal act Virgin. In the 1990s, he spent over a year in a band called Battery Club, which toured with The Offspring.

Rachtman appears in Attack of Life: The Bang Tango Movie, which is a 2016 documentary film directed by Drew Fortier about 80's L.A. hard rock band Bang Tango.

=== Hosting ===
Rachtman made appearances for MTV's heavy metal show Headbangers Ball in 1989 as a fill-in host and guest VJ, while Adam Curry was the show's main host. His friend at the time, Axl Rose of Guns N' Roses, had flown with Rachtman to New York City for an audition at MTV Studios. Despite having no TV experience, he got the job and eventually replaced Curry. From 1990–1995, Rachtman hosted Headbangers Ball as a full-time VJ. Rachtman had a brief appearance as a wedding guest in Guns N' Roses' music video "November Rain".

From August 1993 to January 1996, Rachtman co-hosted the radio advice program Loveline with Dr. Drew Pinsky, before being joined by Adam Carolla in October 1995. The trio hosted together until Rachtman decided to leave and pursue other ventures in January 1996.

In 1999 and 2000, Rachtman worked for World Championship Wrestling as a backstage interviewer. He also hosted Nitro, WCW's flagship program. Rachtman had previously appeared on WCW programming as a guest co-host for the May 30, 1992, edition of Saturday Night.

On the Los Angeles radio station KLSX, Rachtman hosted a show called 'Riki Rachtman Radio.' The show came to an abrupt end when he assaulted fellow KLSX show host Doug Steckler after Steckler insulted Rachtman's girlfriend at the time, adult-film actress Janine Lindemulder.

In 2003, Rachtman hosted 22 Greatest Bands for MTV2.

In 2003, he became the host of a syndicated rock music and NASCAR-themed radio show called Racing Rocks, which is heard on over 120 stations across America. He hosted Nascar 24/7 Live. He was a former co-host of the show NASCAR RaceDay, as of 2008 is no longer part of the program.

Starting in 2020, Rachtman became a part of the American Flat Track motorcycle racing series as an on air personality and hype man at all the live events.

=== Entrepreneurship ===
Rachtman was the owner of The Cathouse nightclub, for many years a showcase for many of the heavy metal bands that were featured on Headbangers Ball. During this time, he also ran another nightclub called the Bordello. Rachtman and the Cathouse club are featured in the Penelope Spheeris documentary, The Decline of Western Civilization Part II: The Metal Years. During their heyday, they were also featured in Rolling Stone and Newsweek magazines.

Rachtman also owns a skateboard company called Pool School.

In the summer of 2015, Rachtman became an ordained minister and performed his first marriage ceremony on August 15, 2015, at the Cathouse Live Concert at Irvine Meadows officiating the ceremony of Skye Hazard and Sean Kelehan of Omaha, Nebraska.

In 2019, Rachtman opened up Cathouse HQ in Mooresville, North Carolina.

In May 2022, Rachtman launched a limited release of CATHOUSE COFFEE.

=== VH1 ===
Rachtman co-hosted the 2007 reunion show for Rock of Love, which starred his friend, Poison frontman Bret Michaels. Rachtman was also a dean on Rock of Love: Charm School, which featured Sharon Osbourne as headmistress and contestants from Rock of Love seasons 1 and 2, and he also hosted its reunion special. In 2008, he hosted the reunion special for Rock of Love 2. In 2009, he again hosted the reunion special for Rock of Love Bus. He was last seen on Daisy of Love, a Rock of Love spin-off starring Daisy De La Hoya, Rachtman's friend and Rock of Love 2 runner-up.

== Personal life ==
By 1999, he had lived in Orange County, California. In 1994, Rachtman told Chris Cornell on a Soundgarden episode of The Headbanger's Ball that he used to live in New Zealand. He spent a year in New Zealand at the age of 16.

In 1991, Rachtman was picked by Bam Magazine as one of the 50 most influential people in music.

In 2018, Rachtman tweeted that he had been drug- and alcohol-free for 30 years.

In November 2014, he announced on his Facebook account that he would be moving to Charlotte, North Carolina.

Every year Rachtman raises money and goes on a motorcycle ride throughout North America. It is called Riki's Ride, and so far has raised close to $50,000 for various charities. On December 6, 2020, during a live web broadcast from Indian Motorcycle of Charlotte, Rachtman announced that 2020 was his last Riki's Ride and presented a check for more than $22,000 to Ryan Blaney for the Ryan Blaney Family Foundation.

On December 12, 2021, Rachtman married Lea Vendetta from the television show Ink Master. Together they live in Mooresville, North Carolina. They divorced in June 2026.

Preceded by Jim Trenton	Co-Host of Loveline; 1993 – 1996	Succeeded by Adam Carolla
