= Classic Vinyl =

- Broadcast area: United States, Canada
- Frequencies: Sirius XM Radio 26; Dish Network 6026

Programming
- Format: Classic rock

Ownership
- Owner: Sirius XM Radio

History
- First air date: 2002
- Former names: Top Tracks (2001; 2008)
- Former frequencies: Sirius 14; XM 46

Technical information
- Class: Satellite Radio Station

Links
- Website: SiriusXM: Classic Vinyl

Classic Vinyl is a Sirius XM Radio channel focusing on classic rock music mostly from the late-1960s to the mid-1970s, with the channel's name meant to indicate that it consists of music that first appeared on vinyl records. This encompasses music from as far back as the early 1960s at times. It broadcasts on Sirius XM Radio channel 26 and Dish Network channel 6026.

== History ==
Classic Vinyl was launched with the rest of the Sirius Satellite Radio lineup in 2002 as the classic rock channel for the station. From the beginning, the station has broadcast live 24/7 from the Rock and Roll Hall of Fame in Cleveland, in conjunction with a deal between Sirius and the Hall. Several other Sirius legacy channels have also had tie-ins with the Hall of Fame. Initially, the channel broadcast on Sirius channel 14. Like other Sirius legacy channels, Classic Vinyl had live DJs in between some songs except on the overnight hours.

Top Tracks logo, 2006-2008.

Meanwhile, then-rival XM Satellite Radio broadcast a similar Classic rock channel called Top Tracks that aired much of the same programming as well as some overlapping programming from Classic Rewind, which airs the "later era" of classic rock. Top Tracks largely cut off at the start of the 1980s where Big Tracks would pick up, although it did air songs from Pink Floyd's The Wall (which was released in November 1979 but is generally viewed as a 1980s album) as well as John Lennon's songs from the 1980 album Double Fantasy just before his murder. Top Tracks aired on XM channel 46 and unlike Classic Vinyl, Top Tracks was completely automated.

As a result of the Sirius-XM merger, Classic Vinyl and Top Tracks merged on November 12, 2008. Although the Classic Vinyl name was carried over, the on-air format is largely that of Top Tracks, with the DJs from Classic Vinyl making on-air appearances. Most of the Top Tracks songs from about 1977 on were moved to Classic Rewind, which merged with Big Tracks. Classic Vinyl initially continued to broadcast from the legacy Sirius and XM channels of 14 and 46, respectively, after the merger of Classic Vinyl with Top Tracks. In 2011, Sirius XM largely realigned the channel lineups to match both services as well as group them by genre, moving Classic Vinyl to its current position on channel 26 for both Sirius and XM radios.

== Classic Vinyl artists ==
- Led Zeppelin
- The Rolling Stones
- The Beatles
- The Who
- The Doors
- The Eagles
- Creedence Clearwater Revival
- Elton John
- Pink Floyd
- The Doobie Brothers
- Eric Clapton
- David Bowie

== Internet Player ==
The internet player can be biased toward "earlier" (60s) or "later" (70s) artists and adjusted as to the amount of British artists which play.

== See also ==
- List of Sirius XM Radio channels
