= Pasadena Presbyterian Church =

Church in Pasadena, California, US

Coordinates: 34.1461°N 118.1390°W

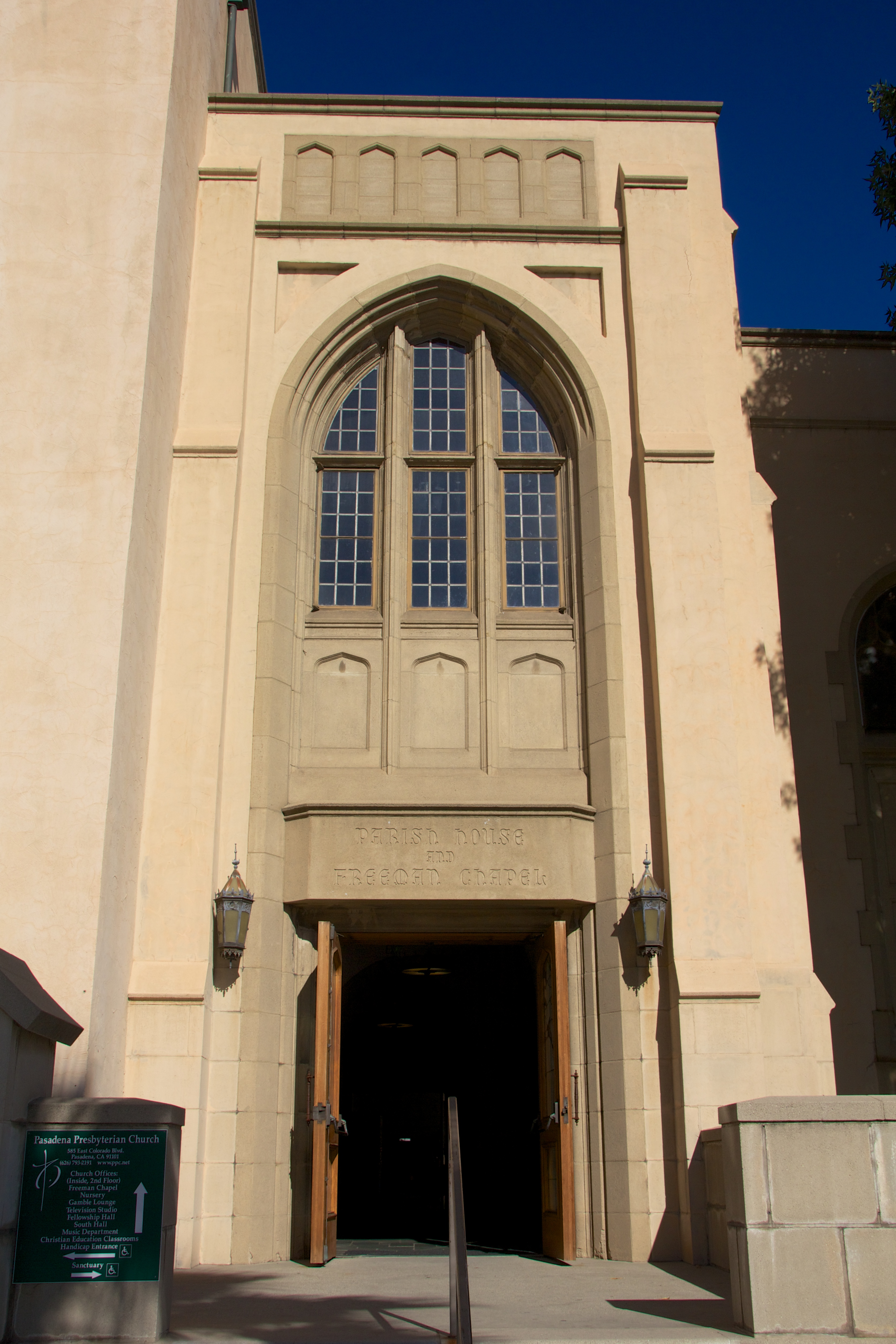
- Pasadena Presbyterian Church
- Country: United States
- Denomination: Presbyterian Church (USA)

Pasadena Presbyterian Church is the first church in Pasadena, California, United States, it was established in 1875. It is located at 585 East Colorado Boulevard. The Modern-style sanctuary was designed by architect John Gougeon of Gougeon-Woodman, completed in 1976.

Los Angeles Children's Chorus (LACC) has office and rehearsal space in Pasadena Presbyterian Church.
