= WFUV =

Radio station in New York City, US

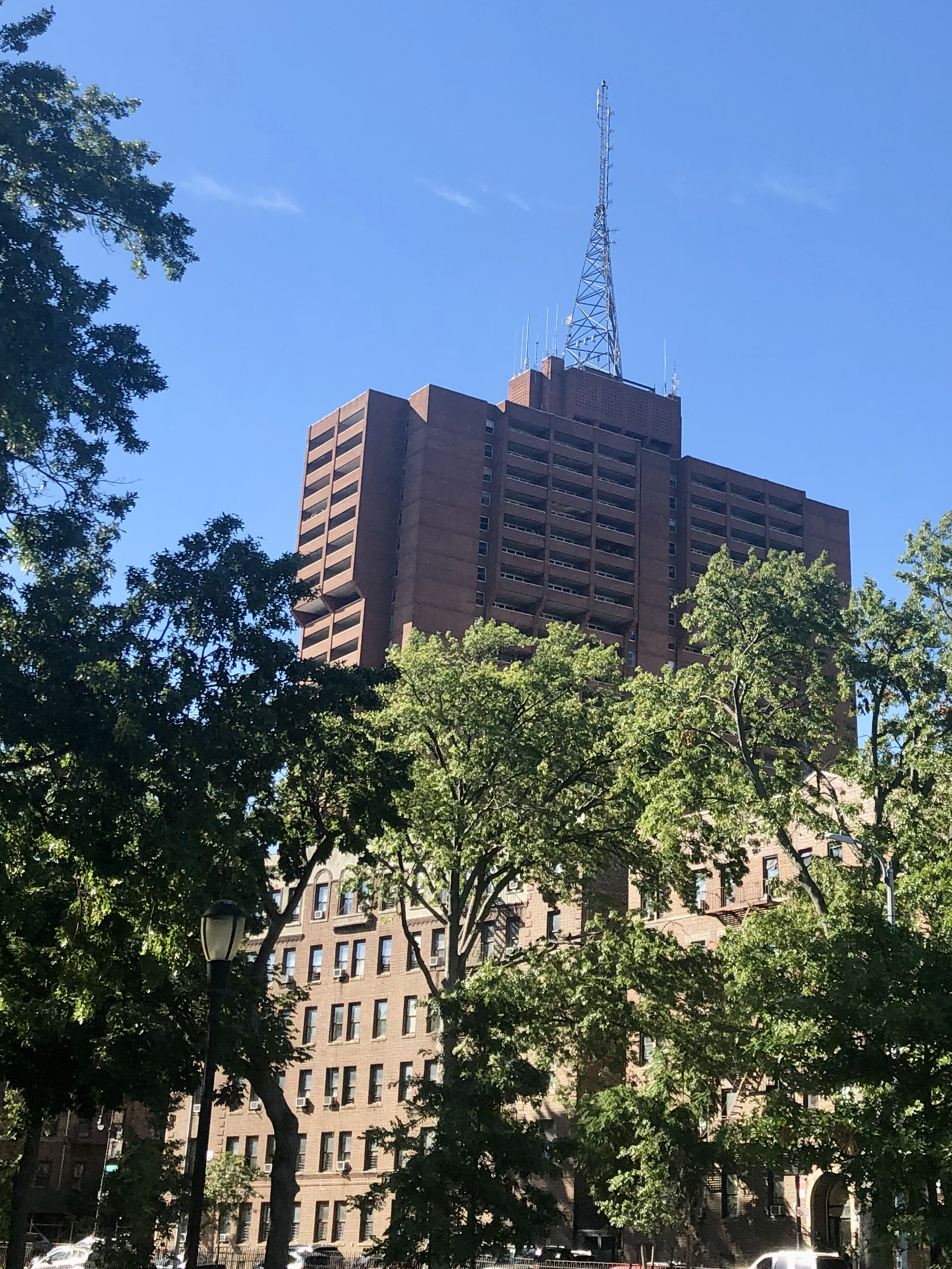
- WFUV's broadcast tower, shared with WVBN, at Montefiore Medical Center
- New York, New York; United States
- Frequency: 90.7 MHz (HD Radio)
- Branding: 90.7 WFUV

Programming
- Language: English
- Format: Adult album alternative; Adult contemporary music
- Subchannels: HD2: "FUV All Music"; (Adult album alternative)
- Affiliations: NPR

Ownership
- Owner: Fordham University

History
- First air date: September 24, 1947
- Call sign meaning: "Fordham University's Voice"

Technical information
- Licensing authority: FCC
- Facility ID: 22033
- Class: B
- ERP: 47,000 watts
- HAAT: 155 meters (509 ft)
- Transmitter coordinates: 40°52′48.4″N 73°52′38.5″W
- Repeater: 90.7 WFUV-FM3 (New York)

Links
- Public license information: Public file; LMS
- Webcast: Listen live
- Website: wfuv.org

WFUV (90.7 FM) is a non–commercial radio station licensed to New York, New York. The station is owned by Fordham University, with studios on its Bronx campus and its antenna atop the nearby Montefiore Medical Center. WFUV first went on the air in 1947. It became a professional public radio station in 1990 and is one of three NPR member stations in New York City. Its on-air staff has included Dennis Elsas, Vin Scelsa, Pete Fornatale, and Rita Houston.

== Background ==
Founded in 1947 by Fordham University, WFUV became a student-run 50,000-watt station in 1968–1969 before transitioning to a public station during the late 1980s. WFUV is a National Public Radio affiliate. The station's call letters stand for "Fordham University's Voice." Though operated as a professional public radio station, WFUV's mission also includes a strong training component for Fordham students. Students receive intensive instruction and are heard on the air in news and sports programming. The station is known for its adult album alternative (AAA) format – a mix of adult rock, singer songwriters, world and other music, formerly branded as "City Folk" as well as Celtic music.

The station serves 375,000 weekly listeners in the New York area and 100,000 more worldwide on the web each month. As of January 2021, WFUV is the third most popular station in any rock music format in the New York market after WAXQ and WNYL. In terms of weekly audience, it is the most listened to noncommercial alternative music station (Note: Excluding KCRW which has a dual talk radio and AAA format.) in the United States. Of all noncommercial stations regardless of format, it is the third most popular in the New York market (after WNYC and WQXR) and 22nd most popular nationally (as of May 2018).

=== Programming ===
Outside of its weekday AAA programming, WFUV airs a variety of specialty shows, which include genres such as folk music and early pop and jazz. National programs heard on WFUV, as of 2021, include World Cafe, The Grateful Dead Hour, and The Thistle and Shamrock. Since 1974 the station has maintained a program called Ceol na nGael, a Sunday tradition of airing a mix of Celtic music accompanied by Fordham University programming during the day and eclectic folk in the evening. In-studio interviews and performances are also a prominent feature of its programming.

== History ==
WFUV was founded in 1947 by Fordham University's communication department. Early programming was a mix of classical, popular, ethnic music and the university's sports broadcasts. Many chamber music and piano recitals were broadcast live from now-defunct Studio B in the 1950s. The station also broadcast a long-running series of live Sunday classical broadcasts from The Ethical Culture Society in Manhattan.

WFUV was on the verge of going off the air in September 1968 due to budgetary cuts by the university, but the students and staff went on strike, organizing rallies and demonstrations to save the station. Around this time, the station became part of the school's Student Affairs division, which was run by students. It had been a 3,500-watt station from its inception until February 21, 1969, when its effective radiated power was increased to 50,000 watts. WFUV's daily rock music programming also began in the late 1960s.

WFUV began broadcasting in stereo on March 31, 1973. In the mid-1980s, the station began to transition to a professionally-operated public station "to increase its public service and community impact". WFUV has been a professional noncommercial radio station since 1990. To be more competitive in the New York market at this time, it introduced a more folk and alternative music sound under the name "City Folk", as well as news/talk radio elements such as weather and traffic reports. The station also adopted the nascent adult album alternative format. This shift was overseen by longtime general manager Dr. Ralph Jennings and program director Chuck Singleton.

In May 1994, Fordham started building a 480-foot-tall (150 m) transmission tower for WFUV on its Rose Hill campus, directly across from the New York Botanical Garden (NYBG)'s Enid A. Haupt Conservatory. The NYBG, which did not know about the tower's construction, subsequently requested that construction of the tower be halted. Construction was delayed for several months before the New York City Department of Buildings ruled that the tower could be built 25 feet (7.6 m) away from its originally proposed location. However, both the NYBG and Fordham disagreed with the proposed compromise. In 1997, the FCC ruled that the tower would negatively affect the NYBG if it were finished, but a New York state court upheld its legality. In 2002, Montefiore Medical Center offered to move WFUV's antenna to its own facilities on Gun Hill Road, one of the highest locations in the Bronx, and Fordham agreed. Fordham subsequently announced in 2004 that it intended to destroy the half-built tower on Rose Hill.

In 2005, the studios, offices, and transmitter moved from the third floor of Keating Hall on Fordham's Rose Hill campus to Keating Hall's basement. The move allowed the station to improve its equipment and gain more space. In 2011, music director Rita Houston took over as the station's program director from Chuck Singleton, who, in turn, became general manager; Houston held the position through 2020. In June 2021, the station named Rich McLaughlin as program director; in addition to his career in radio and streaming music programming, McLaughlin is a Fordham University alumnus who worked for the station as an undergraduate as well as for its digital offering, The Alternate Side.

=== Notable former staff ===
==== Former professional staff ====
Notable past-staff at WFUV include DJs Pete Fornatale and Vin Scelsa. Alan Light, former editor-in-chief of music magazines Vibe and Spin and music critic at the New York Times, was an on-air contributor and music critic during the mid-2000s at WFUV. Longtime DJ Rich Conaty presented his big band show The Big Broadcast on the station from 1972 to 1992, and again from 1998 until his death in 2016. Former program director and DJ Rita Houston, who worked at the station from 1994 until her death in 2020, was a noted New York tastemaker and early champion of artists like Brandi Carlile, Mumford & Sons, Adele, and the Indigo Girls. Binky Griptite, best known as part of Sharon Jones & the Dap-Kings, hosted the weekly show The Boogie Down from 2017 to 2021.

Radio announcer Marty Glickman instructed students in the sports department after his retirement. Glickman was the radio announcer of the New York Knicks, New York Giants, and New York Jets, and the subject of the Martin Scorsese-produced 2013 HBO documentary film Glickman.

==== Former student staff ====
WFUV's rock music shows were formerly hosted by Fordham students, most notably Pete Fornatale, whose first show began in November 1964, when he was a sophomore and who returned to WFUV in 2001 after a 30-year hiatus, remaining until his 2012 death. Other alumni include:

- Alan Alda, M*A*S*H and The West Wing actor
- Ozzie Alfonso, Emmy Award-winning director and writer of educational shows 3-2-1 Contact and Sesame Street
- Jack Haley Jr., film and television producer
- Bob Keeshan, actor, most notable for his role as Captain Kangaroo
- Ted May, Emmy Award-winning director for Sesame Street
- Charles Osgood, retired host of CBS News Sunday Morning and The Osgood Report on CBS Radio
- John Schaefer, noted music journalist and host of WNYC's New Sounds and Soundcheck; former WFUV program director
- Raymond Siller, the head writer for Johnny Carson

News department alumni are/were heard on many stations and networks nationally. These include:

- Scott Detrow, co-host of The NPR Politics Podcast and NPR White House Correspondent
- Alice Gainer, Emmy Award-winning reporter for CBS in New York City
- Richard Hake, longtime WNYC reporter and host of Morning Edition
- Greg Kelly, formerly of Good Day New York and Fox and Friends
- Jonathan Vigliotti, Emmy Award-winning foreign correspondent for CBS News

The sports department has produced numerous notable alumni, most notably, Brooklyn/Los Angeles Dodgers announcer and Baseball Hall of Famer Vin Scully, who helped found WFUV. Other alumni include:

- Mike Breen, television announcer for the New York Knicks and the NBA on ABC, recipient of the 2020 Curt Gowdy Media Award
- Chris Carrino, radio announcer for the Brooklyn Nets and Compass Media
- Jack Curry, studio analyst for YES Network, former sportswriter for The New York Times
- Spero Dedes, television announcer for CBS and Turner, former radio announcer for the Los Angeles Lakers and New York Knicks
- Michael Kay, television announcer for the New York Yankees and host of the radio show The Michael Kay Show and CenterStage
- Malcolm Moran, sportswriter for USA Today and The New York Times, founder of WFUV show One on One, recipient of the 2007 Curt Gowdy Media Award
- Sal Marchiano, retired two-time Emmy Award-winning sports anchor WPIX in New York
- Bob Papa, radio announcer for the New York Giants, announcer for NBC and Golf Channel
- Tony Reali, host of ESPN's Around the Horn and sports contributor to Good Morning America
- Ryan Ruocco, television announcer for the Brooklyn Nets, New York Yankees, NBA on ESPN, and WNBA on ESPN
- Charlie Slowes, radio play-by-play announcer for the Washington Nationals
- Mike Yam, host at Pac-12 Network, former host of ESPN's SportsCenter

== Recognition ==
WFUV has received numerous awards and nominations from professional organizations on local, state, and national levels. The Princeton Review named it one of the top twenty college radio stations every year from 2012 to 2020. In 2013, Complex listed it as the eighth best college radio station in the country.

WFUV is regularly distinguished for their newscasts and public affairs coverage. Nationally, the newsroom has been awarded nearly every year over the past two decades by the Public Radio Journalist Association and the Alliance for Women in Media Foundation's Gracie Awards on both professional and student levels. Since 2009, assistant news and public affairs director Robin Shannon has been awarded six times by these two organizations for Best News Anchor/Newscast. Former music and program director Rita Houston was awarded on multiple occasions by trade organizations FMQB, JBE, Gavin Report, and ASCAP for her work.

Selected national professional awards (1998–present)

- 2000: ASCAP Deems Taylor Awards – Broadcast Award for WFUV's City Folk, The Big Broadcast and Swing Time (Rita Houston and Rich Conaty)
- 2001: Gavin Music Director of the Year – Rita Houston
- 2001: Gavin Station of the Year – WFUV
- 2001: FMQB Triple A Conference – Progressive Noncommercial Radio Station of the Year
- 2002: FMQB Triple A Conference – Progressive Noncommercial Radio Station of the Year
- 2003: FMQB Triple A Conference – Progressive Noncommercial Radio Station of the Year
- 2003: R&R Triple A Summit Industry Achievement Awards – Music Director of the Year – Rita Houston
- 2004: R&R Triple A Summit Industry Achievement Awards – Air Personality of the Year – Rita Houston
- 2004: Lincoln University's Unity Awards in Media – Outstanding Reporting of Education for "Cityscape: Education Beat"
- 2004: National Federation of Community Broadcasters' Golden Reels Awards – Best National Public Affairs Programming for "Democracy on the Block" (Finalist)
- 2005: RTDNA's National Edward R. Murrow Awards – Best News Series (Radio Large Market) for Subculture
- 2007: ASCAP Deems Taylor Awards – Broadcast Award for WFUV's Idiot's Delight (Vin Sclesa)
- 2011: Society of Professional Journalists' Sigma Delta Chi Awards – Best Radio Feature Reporting for "Ernie Harwell: Our Friend in the Booth"
- 2012: FMQB Triple A Conference – Program Director of the Year – Rita Houston
- 2019: FMQB Triple A Conference – Program Director of the Year (Noncommercial) – Rita Houston
- 2020: JBE Triple A Awards – Program Director of the Year (Noncommercial) – Rita Houston
