= WNEW-FM =

Radio station in New York City

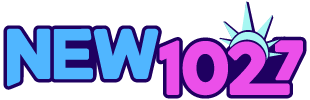
- New York, New York; United States
- Broadcast area: New York metropolitan area
- Frequency: 102.7 MHz (HD Radio)
- Branding: NEW 102-7

Programming
- Language: English
- Format: Hot adult contemporary
- Subchannels: HD2: Channel Q; HD3: Talkline Network (Jewish talk)

Ownership
- Owner: Audacy, Inc.; (Audacy License, LLC)
- Sister stations: WCBS-FM; WFAN; WFAN-FM; WHSQ; WINS; WINS-FM; WXBK

History
- First air date: August 25, 1958
- Former call signs: WWFS (2007–2016)
- Call sign meaning: New York

Technical information
- Licensing authority: FCC
- Facility ID: 25442
- Class: B
- ERP: 6,000 watts (analog); 287 watts (digital)
- HAAT: 415 meters (1,362 ft)
- Transmitter coordinates: 40.748°N 73.986°W

Links
- Public license information: Public file; LMS
- Webcast: Listen live (via Audacy); HD2: Listen live (via Audacy)
- Website: www.audacy.com/new1027; HD2: www.audacy.com/wearechannelq

WNEW-FM (102.7 MHz, NEW 102-7) is a hot adult contemporary formatted commercial radio station, licensed to New York, New York, and owned by Audacy, Inc. The station's studios are located at the Audacy facility in the Hudson Square neighborhood of Manhattan, and its transmitter is located at the Empire State Building.

WNEW-FM is best remembered for one of its previous incarnations, a progressive rock radio format that began in 1967 and lasted into the 1990s. That station became influential in the development of rock music during the 1970s and 1980s.

Between 1958 and 1986, the station shared the WNEW call sign with former sister AM station WNEW (1130 kHz) and television station WNEW-TV (channel 5), with all being owned by Metromedia. After WNEW-TV was sold to News Corporation in 1986 and the AM station was sold to Bloomberg L.P. in 1992, 102.7 FM retained the WNEW-FM call sign until it was changed in 2007; the call letters returned to 102.7 on March 15, 2016.

WNEW-FM broadcasts in the HD Radio format.

== History ==
=== Abortive efforts ===
The 102.7 FM frequency was first assigned in the mid-1940s as WNJR-FM from Newark, New Jersey. Intended to be a simulcasting sister to WNJR (1430 AM), the FM station never made it to the air despite being granted several extensions of its construction permit. WNJR gave up and turned in the FM license to the Federal Communications Commission (FCC) in 1953.

In 1955 the FCC awarded a new permit for 102.7 FM to a group called Fidelity Radio Corporation, based in West Paterson, New Jersey. The station was later granted the call sign WHFI, and a year later the community of license was moved back to Newark from West Paterson. Once again, the owners failed to put the station on the air.

=== WNEW-FM ===
In November 1957, the WHFI construction permit was purchased by the DuMont Broadcasting Corporation, which already owned television station WABD (channel 5) and earlier in the year purchased WNEW radio. In January 1958, WHFI was renamed WNEW-FM, and DuMont completed its build-out, moving the license to New York City. The station finally came on the air on August 25, 1958, mostly simulcasting WNEW (AM) with a popular music format. DuMont Broadcasting, meanwhile, would change its corporate name twice within the next three years before settling on Metromedia in 1961.

==== All-female DJ staff ====
WNEW-FM's early programming also included an automated middle-of-the-road format, followed quickly by a period (July 4, 1966, to September 1967) playing pop music with an unusual twist in its day...an all-female air staff. The lineup of disc jockeys during this stunt included actress and TV personality Peggy Cass, Alison Steele (who stayed on to become the "Night Bird" on the progressive rock format), Rita Sands (later with WCBS Newsradio 880), Margaret Draper, Ann Clements, Arlene Kieta, Pam McKissick, and Nell Bassett. The music was similar to that of WNEW (AM)'s MOR format. But only Bassett, Cass, Draper, Sands and Steele had broadcast experience, and not as disc jockeys. Meanwhile, the male DJs on WNEW (AM) were still very popular, so it was hard for WNEW-FM to find an audience. The all-female disc jockey lineup endured for a little more than a year, switching in September 1967 to a mixed-gender staff, before a major change the following month.

=== "Where Rock Lives" ===
==== Origins and disc jockeys ====
Late 1960s logo, similar to other Metromedia rock stations

On October 30, 1967, WNEW-FM adopted a progressive rock radio format. It was not the first in New York to do so – WOR-FM preceded it – but it was the one that prospered and became famous for the format and that in turn influenced the rock listenership as well as the rock industry. The original disc jockeys were Bill "Rosko" Mercer, who started on October 30, 1967; Jonathan Schwartz, who made his debut on November 16, 1967; and "the Professor" Scott Muni, who first appeared on November 18, 1967. Alison Steele would stay on from the female staff and eventually take over the overnight shift on January 1, 1968.

The station's disc jockeys would broadcast in ways that bore out their personalities:

- morning host Dave Herman was not afraid to mix Erik Satie or Donna Summer into the playlist;
- noontime host Pete Fornatale promoted the Beach Boys when it was not fashionable and later started his eclectic weekend Mixed Bag program;
- afternoon host Muni would use his gravelly voice to introduce largely unknown British artists on his "Things from England" segments;
- nighttime host Schwartz was a raconteur who would sneak in the Sinatra pop standards that he not-so-secretly liked better than rock;
- overnight host Steele would play new-age music and space rock groups in between readings of her equally spacey poetry;
- weekend host Vin Scelsa started his idiosyncratic Idiots' Delight program, which soon gained a devoted following.

Other notable disc jockeys who worked at the station included Dennis Elsas, Meg Griffin, Carol Miller, Richard Neer and John Zacherle.

==== Height of influence ====
WNEW-FM was among the first stations to give Bruce Springsteen significant airplay, and conducted live broadcasts of key Springsteen concerts in 1975 and 1978; Springsteen would sometimes call up the DJs during records. Later, Dave Herman featured a "Bruce Juice" segment each morning. John Lennon once stopped by to guest-DJ along with Dennis Elsas and appeared on-air several other times during his friend Scott Muni's afternoon slot. Members of the Grateful Dead and other groups would hang out in the studio; Emerson, Lake & Palmer's visit to Muni's show is often credited for popularizing the group in America. In addition to music, youth-oriented comedy recordings such as from Monty Python would also be aired.

The station sponsored a benefit concert at Madison Square Garden each holiday season that drew reasonably big-name acts.

The station thrived during the late 1970s when it helped boost the transition of the punk rock/new wave movement into the mainstream. During this era, the station hosted many live broadcasts from the legendary Greenwich Village night club, The Bottom Line. Among the bands featured live from the club were The Police, Joe Jackson, Squeeze, The Records, Rachel Sweet, David Johansen, Rockpile, Mink DeVille and the Tom Robinson Band. Many of these bands were being spotlighted during their debut New York City performance.

At the same time, the station began to feel the threat of disco. They hired Gianettino and Meredith Advertising to come up with a way to communicate with the New York area. The pitch by creative director George Meredith to station manager Mel Karmazin: "You can't tell them what you want to say, which is 'Disco Sucks,' but you can tell them that 'Rock Lives.'" That became their battle cry, and it could fairly be said that WNEW-FM earned the slogan "Where Rock Lives". The station's television commercials during these years featured the song "Layla" by Derek and the Dominos and was considered one of the station's anthems.

Beginning in the mid-1970s and extending into the 1980s, WNEW fielded a successful softball team, the WNEW All-Stars, playing in and around the New York metropolitan area and competing in the New York Sports and Entertainment League. Among the All-Stars were DJs Thom Morrera, Jim Monaghan, Richard Neer, Dan Neer and Pat Dawson, along with Crawdaddy editor Peter Knobler at shortstop, music business regulars Bobby Diebold, Jack Hopke, Ed Vitale, Matt Birkbeck, Ralph Cuccurullo and John "Boots" Boulos in the outfield, and Michael "Chopper" Boulos at second base. The team consistently won deep into the playoffs, playing against teams led by Meat Loaf, among others.

On the evening of December 8, 1980, Vin Scelsa broke the news of the murder of John Lennon to the WNEW-FM audience. The station became a kind of therapy center for the rock community, playing Lennon's music for 24 hours straight and opening up its lines for calls from grieving listeners.

In the 1980s, the station gradually adopted a more conventional album-oriented rock format, and sometimes seemed stodgy compared to college radio stations playing alternative rock. When long-time competitor WPLJ switched away from rock in 1983, WNEW-FM picked up some of its most popular DJs, such as Carol Miller, and years later, Pat St. John, who would take over the morning show and programming duties.

In 1986, following the sale of WNEW-TV and Metromedia's other television outlets to News Corporation, the company's radio station group was spun off from Metromedia into a new company, Metropolitan Broadcasting. Two years later, WNEW-FM was sold to Westinghouse Broadcasting, bringing it into common ownership with all-news outlet WINS. WNEW-FM and WINS became CBS-owned stations in 1996, when Westinghouse Broadcasting's corporate parent purchased the network.

==== Declining relevance and changes ====
By the 1990s, the station was further losing relevance in the face of the popularity of grunge rock and so became more of a classic rock station. It spent its remaining music days flip flopping between a variety of classic, adult album and alternative rock.

On September 1, 1990, WWHB on Long Island began simulcasting WNEW-FM. The simulcast would be dropped on December 7, 1996, when WWHB flipped to country and joined a simulcast with a network of suburban stations as Y-107.

On July 7, 1995, WNEW-FM adopted an adult album alternative format. The station, which now had the slogan of "New York's Rock Alternative", evolved to an eclectic mix of adult rock by the end of 1995. Longtime listeners were alienated when Jerry Garcia's death on August 9, 1995, was virtually ignored by the station.

In January 1996, the station declined to switch to classic rock when WXRK, also known as K-Rock, which had a classic rock format for several years, decided to adopt an alternative rock format. In July 1996, WAXQ adopted a classic rock format. In January 1997, the station reverted to a classic rock format, becoming the second choice for the format when earlier they could have been first. At this point, many long-time fans felt WNEW-FM had completely lost its focus.

Throughout the 1990s, many of WNEW-FM's DJs defected to classic rock competitors WXRK and later WAXQ, or to smaller but more freeform WFUV. Ratings remained dismal. In 1996, Westinghouse merged with CBS. Infinity Broadcasting would then merge with CBS in 1997, and CBS retained the Infinity name for its radio division; thus, ownership of this station would go from one network owner to another.

In December 1997, sister station WFAN (then flagship station of the MetroStars) announced that WNEW-FM would be their FM flagship station after Infinity Broadcasting (now Entercom) reached a six-year extension deal (starting in the 1998 MLS season) with the MSG Network and the MetroStars to simulcast their games until the 2004 season. However, in the fall of 2004, the MetroStars and the MSG Network reached a deal with Disney-owned radio station WEPN and then-sister FM station WPLJ to broadcast their games, ending their relationship with Infinity/CBS Radio.

In 1998, WNEW-FM moved to a harder-edged active rock format and continued to slump in the ratings. The remaining older DJs left on the station departed one by one during 1998. In June of that year, ex-Boston shock jocks Opie and Anthony arrived from WAAF to do afternoons on WNEW. They played several songs an hour, but for the most part, the show was a typical shock-jock talk show. Opie and Anthony immediately got attention from the station by interrupting their annual "Evolution of Rock and Roll" event by refusing to play the music, or destroying the CDs. They were confronted by WNEW peer Carol Miller a few times on the air, until they were forbidden by management to make eye contact.

With Opie and Anthony's ratings soaring, Infinity announced in June 1999 that the station would drop its 32-year rock format for a "hot talk" format in September. On September 12, 1999, sole remaining long-time jock Richard Neer signed off his Sunday morning show by playing Bruce Springsteen's dirge-like "Racing in the Street", and identifying the station one last time, changing the slogan to "Where Rock Lived". The day after, on September 13, in the run-up to 3 pm, the rock format ended with an all-request midday show by Ralph Tortora (which featured a phone call from Billy Joel, who talked about the impact WNEW had on his life), which concluded with "Thank You" by Led Zeppelin, "Better Things" by The Kinks and "The End" by The Beatles, followed by the famous final chord of their song "A Day in the Life".

=== "Hot talk" era ===
WNEW logo during its "hot talk" era

After a commercial break, the new hot talk format officially began as "FM Talk @ 102.7, Talk You Can't Ignore". Opie and Anthony signed on the talk format by saying that WNEW did not die that day or that week, but that "it died years ago", saying that WNEW's death had been "the longest funeral ever", and inaugurated "FM Talk" by holding an on-air funeral for the old rock format, complete with a coffin, hearse, and a fat lady singing "Na Na Hey Hey Kiss Him Goodbye".

The new format consisted of shock jocks, including Opie and Anthony, Don and Mike, The Radio Chick, Ron and Fez and Tom Leykis. Mornings featured "guy talk" from Mason & Kalinsky, who would be replaced by morning programming that revolved around sports, such as The Sports Guys and Ferrall in the Morning hosted by Scott Ferrall, while overnight programming featured syndicated programs such as Loveline and repeats of weekday programming. On weekends, the station retained a hard rock music format with live announcers, including Tony Pigg and Tom Rich, both of whom were held over from prior to the introduction of the hot talk format. In 2000, Viacom acquired CBS/Infinity Broadcasting, keeping the radio division under the "Infinity" banner. By 2002, WNEW added brokered programming on weekends and stopped playing music altogether, with the exception of Eddie Trunk's Friday and Saturday night hard rock-oriented shows, as well as Vin Scelsa's Idiot's Delight.

On September 11, 2001, Opie and Anthony did their show live from the WLIR studios because of the terrorist attacks on the World Trade Center, which caused city officials to block all roads going into Manhattan. The Don and Mike Show started a little earlier than usual, and stayed on for most of the morning and mid-afternoon. Ron and Fez did their show at WNEW at the regular time. All three shows opened the airways and let the listeners speak their minds and let other listeners who were looking for loved ones search for them by descriptions.

During this time, the station's ratings were abysmal apart from Opie and Anthony. A harbinger for the "hot talk" format's end came in August 2002, when Opie and Anthony were fired for encouraging a stunt involving two people allegedly engaging in sexual intercourse in a vestibule within St. Patrick's Cathedral. The FCC eventually fined Infinity $357,000—the maximum fine allowed by law, and the third largest indecency fine in American radio history at the time. FCC Commissioner Michael Copps dissented, claiming the FCC should have taken steps to revoke WNEW's license. A few months earlier, the FCC had fined Infinity $21,000 for three "patently offensive" Opie and Anthony broadcasts, including one referring to incest.

The station's ratings plummeted even further—in the fall of 2002, it only netted a 0.7 rating, an unprecedented level for a major-market FM station, and lower than ratings for noncommercial stations. With the cancellation of the only show that generated any ratings for the station, management decided that the station needed to take a new direction.

=== "Blink 102.7" ===
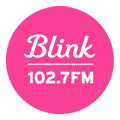
WNEW first logo as "Blink 102.7"

On January 27, 2003, at 1 am, WNEW officially dropped the talk format. For the next three months, the station stunted with CHR music, using a limited playlist of approximately 50 songs from artists like Pink, Eminem, Bowling for Soup, and Avril Lavigne, as well as nightly simulcasts of CBS's Late Show with David Letterman.

Sounders during that period teased listeners about how "a new station" would soon be coming to the 102.7 frequency, and it arrived at 8 p.m. on April 10, when WNEW became "Blink 102.7" and adopted an unusual "Entertainment AC" format, launching with "Rock Your Body" by Justin Timberlake. The station mixed old and contemporary pop hits with talk shows and entertainment news from sources such as E!; on-air personalities during this period included the morning team of Chris Booker and Lynda Lopez (who were also dating during this time), game show host Todd Newton and afternoons with Tim Virgin and Alison Stewart. Other personalities included Rick Stacy, Michael Maze and reporters Matt Wolfe and Lisa Chase, providing hourly entertainment updates. The station also used AOL Instant Messenger to take requests, and 24 star Kiefer Sutherland was the station's voice.

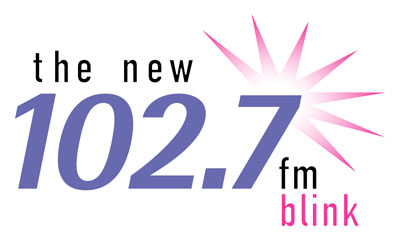
WNEW last logo as "Blink 102.7"

However, the station's ratings sank further. The station's pink logo led to the derisive nickname "Barbie Radio", and Booker & Lopez did little more on the air than talk about Jennifer Lopez, Lynda's older sister. On September 12, the station fired most of the staff, rebranded as "102.7 Blink FM: Music Women Love", and adopted a more mainstream adult contemporary format, with ratings going up slightly. That November, the station (like many AC stations) adopted the increasingly popular "all Christmas music, all the time" format, and dropped the "Blink" format after less than 7 months for the name "New York's New 102.7 FM".

=== "Mix 102.7" ===
"Mix 102.7" logo used from 2003 to 2006

On December 26, 2003, at 10:27 am, the station became "Mix 102.7", making the switch to a more rhythmic-leaning adult contemporary format, playing a range of upbeat, danceable hits from the 1970s to the 2000s, with the slogan "The Station That Picks You Up and Makes You Feel Good". The first song on "Mix" was Ain't No Stoppin' Us Now by McFadden & Whitehead. The original program director was Smokey Rivers, and the music director was Rick Martini. WNEW initially was a mainstream AC, but began to focus on dance hits, mainly from the 1970s and 1980s, by the end of January. In the succeeding months, the "mix" tended to skew towards 1990s and current dance hits (during this time, program director Frankie Blue was fired for drunken on-air behavior, not only saying "fuck" on-air, but also misidentifying the station as rival "103.5 KTU"), with this all culminating in a change with Rick Martini as the new program director and an official "classic dance" or rhythmic AC format in early 2005 under the slogan "Move to the Mix", and in the later months, adopted the "New York's Classic Dance Mix" slogan. However, the "Mix 102.7" moniker and the WNEW call letters remained. Ratings continued to be among the lowest of any major station in New York City.

On December 31, 2005, the station underwent another ownership change after Viacom and CBS Corporation organized a split that saw the Infinity Broadcasting division go under CBS ownership, which resulted in a corporate name change to CBS Radio.

In December 2006, the station began increasing the amount of Christmas music, and at the same time, Michelle Visage was let go and Joe Causi was relegated to his Sunday night Studio 54 classic Disco program. As of December 22, 2006, Paco Lopez, Efren Sifuentes, Carol Ford and Yvonne Velázquez had also been released in anticipation of an expected format change.

In 2006, WNEW launched WNEW-HD2, an HD Radio channel, broadcasting 1010 WINS.

=== "Fresh 102.7" ===
First logo for Fresh 102.7 used from 2007 to 2017. (From 2007 to 2011, this logo was used with the "Today's Fresh Music" slogan.)

On January 2, 2007, at 5 am, after playing Kool and the Gang's "Fresh", WNEW flipped to an adult contemporary format known as "Fresh 102.7", with "How to Save a Life" by The Fray being the first song played. Program director Rick Martini remained in charge of programming the new format, targeted to a younger (age 25–44) female audience, with claims of a playlist "without the kid stuff or tired, old and boring music like the lite station" (though the former is no longer mentioned), an obvious shot at competitor WLTW (in response, the station briefly dropped its Lite FM moniker and was referred to on-air as simply "106.7" during that time). The station would also compete against WPLJ. Around 2009, the station began to add more 1980s hits (most of which could not be played on its classic hits sister station WCBS-FM).

The WWFS calls were approved on January 9, 2007, by the Federal Communications Commission, resulting in the WNEW calls disappearing from the New York radio/television spectrum after being used continuously in the market since 1934. The WNEW call letters were transferred to a CBS-owned station in West Palm Beach, Florida during the second week of January 2007, reportedly to keep another New York station from claiming the historic call. In December 2011, CBS again transferred the WNEW call letters to 99.1 FM in Washington, D.C. as it began an all-news format.

Until the launch of WWFS, WLTW had gone unchallenged as the only adult contemporary station in New York City (along with rimshots New Brunswick, New Jersey's WMGQ, and Hempstead, New York's WKJY), and was the most listened to station in the city for years. WWFS's ratings improved after switching to the adult contemporary format, with increases in both the Winter 2007 and Spring 2007 ratings periods. After a peak 3.1 rating in the Spring 2007 period, WWFS settled down to a 2.5 rating in the Summer 2007 period. Some speculate that WWFS has drawn listeners from WLTW, causing that station's ratings to decline.

As a result of the station's success, CBS Radio cloned the format and branding in Chicago on WCFS-FM, Washington, D.C.'s WIAD, and KEZK in St. Louis, although the Washington station was hot AC.

On October 12, 2011, the station dropped the Today's Fresh Music slogan and shifted to hot AC while also adopting the "Fresh Music...Better Variety" slogan. (However, CBS Radio still reported the station as an AC.) WWFS did not switch to all-Christmas music on Christmas Eve and Christmas Day, 2011, as main rival WPLJ aired Christmas music during those days.

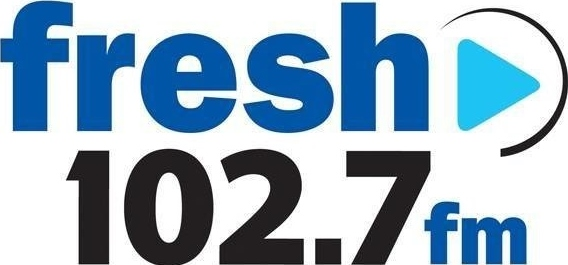
Last logo for Fresh 102.7 used from 2017 to 2018.

After the flip to hot AC, ratings improved for a time, surpassing WPLJ by having a 3.9 share over WPLJ's 2.7 in December 2011. By June 2015, with ratings down again, they started adding more adult-targeting alternative music to their playlist and saw an increase in the ratings from 2.4 in June 2015 to 3.5 in July 2015.

On March 15, 2016, the station reverted to the WNEW-FM callsign, as the previous station to hold the calls changed theirs to WDCH-FM at the same time.

On February 2, 2017, CBS Radio announced it would merge with Entercom. The merger was approved on November 9, 2017, and was consummated on the 17th.

=== The All "NEW" 102.7 ===
On the afternoon of July 13, 2018, WNEW began running jockless and airing liners between songs taking swipes at WLTW and promoting something "NEW" to come the following Monday, July 16; at 6 a.m. that day, WNEW-FM relaunched as "The All NEW 102.7", with "Send My Love (To Your New Lover)" by Adele as the first song played under the "NEW" brand, with the intention of taking direct aim at WLTW. WNEW had ranked 16th in the New York market in the June 2018 Nielsen Audio ratings with a 2.4 share, while WLTW led the market with a 7.3 share. Despite the rebranding, the station remained a hot AC station, with a playlist featuring current and recurrent hits from artists like Ed Sheeran, Taylor Swift, Fifth Harmony and Imagine Dragons, mixed with songs from as far back as the 1990s from artists like Jennifer Lopez and Aerosmith.

WNEW-FM became the only hot AC station in New York City in May 2019, when WPLJ signed off and became the east coast flagship station for the K-Love Contemporary Christian music network, after Cumulus Media sold the station to Educational Media Foundation in February 2019. Since then, WNEW-FM's ratings have been rising; a 3.3 share in the June 2019 ratings for ages 6+, 3.8 in September 2019, and then a 4.1 in December 2019 (ahead of WKTU, who had a 3.4 in December 2019).

== HD radio operations ==
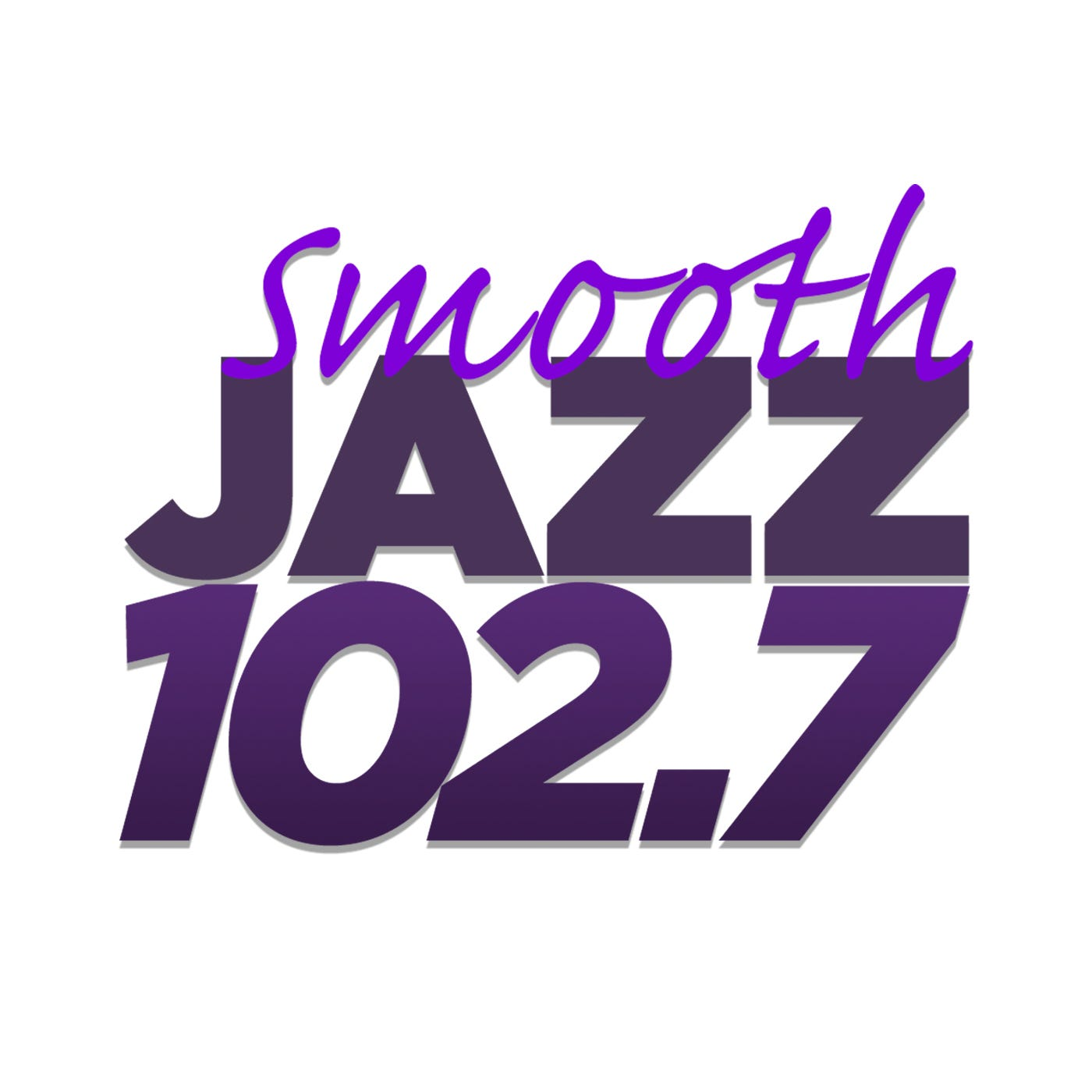
WNEW-HD2 "Smooth Jazz 102.7" logo

In April 2003, WNEW-FM launched the "Blink" format, describing itself as "The first FM station in New York to broadcast in high definition radio."

WNEW-HD2 was launched in 2006 as a simulcast of all-news sister station 1010 WINS. On April 12, 2008, WNEW-HD2 (as WWFS-HD2) flipped to a rock format, under the branding of "102.7 WNEW" and the slogan "Where Rock Lives". In early October 2008, the WINS simulcast returned to 102.7 on WWFS-HD3. After WINS began simulcasting full-time on 92.3 FM (formerly WNYL) on October 27, 2022, the WINS simulcast would be dropped from the HD3 channel, which was removed entirely.

In 2009, the rock format on WWFS-HD2 switched to an alternative format from internet radio website last.fm known as "Last FM Discover", which aired on several CBS Radio owned HD subchannels.

In November 2012, WWFS-HD2 flipped to an all-Christmas format. The Christmas format continued into January and early February. On February 7, 2013, the all-Christmas format changed to a mainstream smooth jazz format under the name "Smooth Jazz 102.7". The smooth jazz format was discontinued in February 2023, resulting in only an HD1 frequency available.

In 2016, WNEW-HD4 (as WWFS-HD4) signed on with a Russian language format as "Russkaya Reklama". In late 2017, this moved to WPLJ's HD2 sub-channel, where it remained until that station became a K-Love affiliate on May 31, 2019.

In 2024, WNEW-HD2 returned to the air with Channel Q, which moved from WINS-FM's HD3 channel. In 2024 WNEW-FM HD3 returned on the air as talklinenetwork.com.
