= The Radio Chick =

American radio personality

The Radio Chick is the on-air name for Leslie Gold, an American radio personality whose talk show features comedian Chuck Nice and her producer, Paul "Butch" Brennan. Leslie is a recurring guest host on the Fox News Radio Network heard nationally.

== Broadcasting history ==
Gold and Lori Kramer hosted Two Chicks Dishing an evening talk show on WRKO in Boston. In 1999, Gold was one of the first hosts on NYC station WNEW-FM's hot talk format change. Gold and Brennan staged a well publicized attack on Kathie Lee Gifford while Gifford was substitute hosting for David Letterman. The attack was aired on TV. "The Radiochick" show became a hit shortly thereafter, but despite the strong ratings Gold and her team were fired toward the end of 2000. She then began hosting the morning show on WAXQ, a classic rock station. At that time, Gold was the only woman headlining a morning radio show in NYC. Again, however, this did not last and Gold moved "The Radio Chick" to satellite radio. Her show was heard on Sirius Satellite radio in 2004 and 2005 on the "Sirius Stars" channel. In 2006 Gold returned to New York radio and became the afternoon drive time host for WFNY's Free FM talk format.

On May 24, 2007, Gold announced that due to WFNY's return to the K-Rock format and WXRK call letters, she was no longer going to air her show on the station. She has announced that she is currently associated with the 2008 version of The Gong Show on Comedy Central. In addition she has been slated to host the television pilot TMI which stands for "Too Much Information."

Gold broadcast at Shovio's Talk Back TV, a revolutionary technology in broadcasting. Gold guest hosts on Fox News Radio and appears as a commentator from time to time on the Fox News Channel. Gold lives in New York City with rock drummer Carmine Appice.
