= Carol Miller (DJ) =

American DJ and radio personality

Carol Miller is an American radio personality and disc jockey. She has been a steady presence on rock radio stations in the New York metropolitan area since 1973. She began her broadcasting career at WMMR in Philadelphia as an undergraduate student at the University of Pennsylvania. She later hosted radio shows at WPLJ and WNEW-FM. She has been heard most recently on WAXQ ("Q-104.3") and Sirius XM.

Miller is an ardent champion of classic rock music. In addition to her live radio program, she hosts the nightly Led Zeppelin tribute show, Get the Led Out, which has been in syndication since 1984 and is at 8:00 pm every weekday on Q-104.3. Her autobiography, Up All Night: My Life and Times in Rock Radio, was published in 2012.

== Early life and education ==
Miller was born in 1950, in Queens, New York City. At the age of 10, she and her family moved to New Hyde Park on Long Island, where she attended Herricks High School.

She attended the University of Pennsylvania in Philadelphia, where she earned a degree in biology. While there, she volunteered at the University of Pennsylvania's college radio station. In late 1971, she began working professionally at the progressive rock station WMMR in Philadelphia. She returned to Long Island to pursue a Juris Doctor degree at Hofstra Law School in Hempstead, New York, but maintained her working position at WMMR. With help from her friend and fellow disc jockey Dennis Elsas, she took on a second job at WMMR's sister station, WNEW-FM, in New York City.

== Career ==
Miller made her New York City radio debut at WNEW-FM in 1973, where she worked for a little over a year.

She worked for the short-lived WQIV-FM in 1974, and began at WPLJ in the following year. Her evening show was part of a talent roster on WPLJ that proved very successful, and included Tony Pigg, Pat St. John, and John Zacherle, and Jim Kerr.

One of Miller's favorite musical artists is Bruce Springsteen. At WPLJ, she became a very public voice of a drive to make "Born to Run" the New Jersey state anthem. On June 12, 1979, the New Jersey General Assembly acknowledged its widespread support and declared "Born to Run" to be the state's "Unofficial Youth Rock Anthem".

She returned to WNEW-FM in 1983. In 1984, she founded, Get the Led Out, a nationally syndicated radio show dedicated to Led Zeppelin. The now syndicated show, Carol Miller's Get The Led Out, chronicles the history of Led Zeppelin. In 1985, she reported on new music in 90-second spots for Entertainment Tonight.

Miller currently appears on New York radio station WAXQ ("Q-104.3") as well as Sirius XM’s Deep Tracks, Classic Rewind, and other channels. She still plays her preferred musical style: "Classic rock is not an oldies format. It’s a lifestyle format. I don’t see it as part of the past at all."

Miller's memoir, Up All Night: My Life and Times in Rock Radio, was published in 2012. In it, she chronicles her extensive battles with breast and endometrial cancers,

In 2022, Miller was inducted into the Radio Hall of Fame.

== Personal life ==
During her DJ career, Miller had relationships with rock stars Steven Tyler of Aerosmith, Paul Stanley of Kiss, and David Coverdale of Whitesnake.

From 1982 to 1987, she was married to fellow DJ Mark Goodman. She subsequently married music producer and sound engineer Paul Logus.
