= Scott Muni =

American rock disc jockey (1930–2004)

- Born: Donald Allen Muñoz; May 10, 1930; Wichita, Kansas, U.S.
- Died: September 28, 2004 (aged 74); New York City, New York, U.S.
- Occupation: Disc jockey
- Years active: 1953–2004
- Children: 5

Scott Muni (May 10, 1930 – September 28, 2004) was an American disc jockey, who worked at the heyday of the AM Top 40 format and then was a pioneer of FM progressive rock radio. Rolling Stone magazine termed him "legendary".

== Early life ==
Born Donald Allen Muñoz in Wichita, Kansas, Muni grew up in New Orleans. He joined the United States Marine Corps and began broadcasting there in 1950, reading "Dear John" letters over Radio Guam. After leaving the Corps and having considered acting as a career, he began working as a disc jockey; in 1953 he began working at WSMB (1350 AM) in New Orleans. His mentor was Marshall Pearce.

Muni joined the staff of WAKR (1590 AM) in Akron, Ohio in November 1956 as their overnight host. The following July, he was promoted to host Request Review, an evening music program famously helmed by Alan Freed a decade earlier. In addition to Request Review, Muni presented nightly weather forecasts on WAKR's television adjunct WAKR-TV (channel 49), hosted The Hop—a local music and dance program—on WAKR-TV, was WAKR's music director, and emceed teenage sock hops throughout the city. Prior to leaving the station, Muni was honored by the Akron Junior Chamber of Commerce for one sock hop that also fundraised for a local children's home.

Along with his work at WSMB and WAKR, Muni also worked for a time in Kankakee, Illinois.

== Career ==
Muni then spent almost 50 years at stations in New York City. He left WAKR in May 1958 to join WMCA (570 AM), one of the first Top 40 stations in the market. While at WMCA, Muni was briefly the subject of unwanted attention in both New York and Akron when a congressional investigation into the practice of payola called him in for questioning. He moved to WABC (770 AM) in late 1960 as that station fully converted into a Top 40 format of its own; Muni was billed as part of the "Swingin' Seven at 77" airstaff that also included fellow former WAKR colleague Charlie Greer. There he did an early evening show called "Scotland's Yard" and was among the first WABC DJs to capture the attention of the teenage audience for which the station would become famous. He also participated in the competition to cover The Beatles on their first visits to the United States, and thus began a long association with them.

In 1965, Muni left WABC and ran the Rolling Stone Night Club while doing occasional fill-in work for WMCA. Muni had explored some opportunities beyond radio: for a short time he co-hosted a local weekly television show on WABC-TV (channel 7) with Bruce "Cousin Brucie" Morrow, and he would go on to record the spoken single "Letter to an Unborn Child", about a soldier with a premonition, which was released in 1967 to little acclaim.

Muni decided to return to radio, and in 1966, he joined WOR-FM (98.7), one of the earliest stations in the country to program free-form progressive rock music. The progressive format did not last at that station. In 1967 Muni moved to WNEW-FM (102.7), which had been running a format of pop hits and show tunes, hosted by an all-woman staff. This time, the Progressive Rock format took hold, with WNEW-FM becoming a legendary rock station. Muni stayed there for three decades as the afternoon DJ and sometimes program director. Muni was described by fellow WNEW-FM DJ Dennis Elsas as "the heart and soul of the place". Under assorted management changes during the 1990s WNEW-FM changed formats, and in 1998 Muni ended up hosting a one-hour noontime classic rock program at WAXQ (104.3 FM), where he worked until suffering a stroke in early 2004.

Muni was known to his listeners by the nicknames "Scottso" or "The Professor", the latter to emphasize his rock expertise. While he sometimes spoke in roundabout phrases and succumbed to progressive rock radio clichés such as "That was a tasty cut from ...", he also conveyed on the air and in his professional relationships a gruff immediacy that was a by-product of both his time in the Marines and his earlier Top 40 skills. His low, gravelly voice was instantly recognizable and often lampooned, both by other disc jockeys and by impressionists such as on Imus in the Morning.

A bizarre exchange occurred on October 6, 1975, when a hostage-holding bank robber in lower Manhattan called Muni on the air and engaged him in a conversation about the robber's often nonsensical demands. The robber requested to hear the Grateful Dead, and the two peppered their post-hippie speech with discussions of Bob Dylan music and the like. Muni helped to keep the robber calm, and hours later the situation was resolved, and the robber captured, without any casualties. (Some Muni obituaries credit this incident as having been an inspiration for the film Dog Day Afternoon, but the film was based on a different, 1972 incident, and had already been out in theaters for a couple of weeks by the time of the Muni episode.)

Muni specialized in playing records from up-and-coming, or sometimes just-plain-obscure, acts from the United Kingdom on his weekly Friday "Things from England" segment. He also hosted the syndicated radio programs Ticket to Ride and Scott Muni's World of Rock.

Muni often referred to "we interviewed so and so," making reference to himself and either "Black" Earl Douglas or another producer. Indeed, Muni was friendly with many of the musicians whom he played, and they would often stop by the studio to visit on-air. He played poker in the studio with the Grateful Dead, and he would let Emerson, Lake & Palmer browse the station's huge record library and put on whatever they liked. An oft-related story tells that he was interviewing Jimmy Page when the guitarist suddenly passed out from the aftereffects of the Led Zeppelin lifestyle. Muni calmly put on a record, revived Page, and completed the interview on the studio floor.

Muni was close to John Lennon and his family. After Lennon's murder he vowed to always open his show with a Lennon or Beatles record, a pledge that he kept for the balance of his career, often playing a "Beatles block".

In addition to radio broadcasting, Muni also did voice-over work for radio and television; the most known were a commercial for Rolaids antacid ("How do you spell relief?") and promos for Monday Night Football. He also voiced episodes of NBC's Friday Night Videos during 1985–86 and promos for ABC Sports which included boxing events on Wide World of Sports, the USFL on ABC, the Pro Bowlers Tour, the Sugar Bowl, the 1994 Stanley Cup Playoffs, and auto racing, including the Indy 500. His voice is also heard giving the introduction on the 1971 live albums Chicago at Carnegie Hall and Melanie at Carnegie Hall.

== Personal life ==
Muni had five children: three with his first wife and two with his second wife, to whom he was married from 1966 until his death in 2004.

== Death and legacy ==
Muni died on September 28, 2004, at the age of 74 in New York City and is buried in St. Gertrude's Roman Catholic Cemetery in Colonia, New Jersey.

Muni is included in an exhibit display of important disc jockeys at the Rock and Roll Hall of Fame. The DJs at Q104.3 keep Muni's promise to New York listeners and still start their noon hour with the "12 o'clock Beatles Block".

Muni was inducted into the Rock Radio Hall of Fame in the "Legends of Rock Radio-Programming" category for his work at WNEW in 2014. He was inducted into the National Radio Hall of Fame in 2015.
