= WINS-FM =

All-news radio station in New York City

Simulcast with WINS, New York, New York
- New York, New York; United States
- Broadcast area: New York metropolitan area
- Frequency: 92.3 MHz (HD Radio)
- Branding: 1010 WINS on 92-3 FM

Programming
- Language: English
- Format: All-news radio
- Subchannels: HD2: Alternative radio (Alt 92-3); HD3: True Oldies Channel
- Affiliations: ABC News Radio; Associated Press; Bloomberg Radio

Ownership
- Owner: Audacy, Inc.; (Audacy License, LLC)
- Sister stations: WCBS-FM; WFAN; WFAN-FM; WHSQ; WINS; WNEW-FM; WXBK

History
- First air date: December 25, 1948
- Former call signs: WMCA-FM (1948–1951); WHOM-FM (1951–1975); WKTU (1975–1985); WXRK (1985−2005); WFNY-FM (2006–2007); WXRK (2007−2012); WNOW-FM (2012–2014); WBMP (2014–2018); WNYL (2018–2022)
- Call sign meaning: Taken from sister station WINS

Technical information
- Licensing authority: FCC
- Facility ID: 58579
- Class: B
- ERP: 6,000 watts (analog); 260 watts (digital)
- HAAT: 415 meters (1,362 ft)
- Transmitter coordinates: 40.748°N 73.986°W

Links
- Public license information: Public file; LMS
- Webcast: Listen live (via Audacy); Listen live (HD2); Listen live; (HD3)
- Website: www.audacy.com/1010wins; www.audacy.com/alt923 (HD2); trueoldieschannel.com; (HD3)

WINS-FM (92.3 MHz) is a radio station licensed to New York, New York, and owned by Audacy, Inc. WINS-FM simulcasts all-news radio station WINS (AM) (1010 kHz), with the station referred to on air as "1010 WINS on 92-3 FM". The station's studios are located in the Hudson Square neighborhood in Manhattan.

WINS-FM is a class B station with an effective radiated power (ERP) of 6,000 watts. Its transmitter is located at the Empire State Building. WINS-FM also broadcasts in HD Radio.

Originally co-owned with WMCA, this station has featured a series of contemporary music, soft rock, classic rock, mellow rock, alternative rock and hot talk formats from 1975 to 2022. As the home of "Disco 92 WKTU", this station overtook WABC as New York's top-rated hit music station in the late 1970s.

In 1985, the station became "K-Rock". Howard Stern was hired, giving WXRK a ratings boost. "The Howard Stern Show" was later nationally syndicated from WXRK via owner Infinity Broadcasting Corporation. WXRK's format varied between different iterations of rock, including classic and alternative, until Stern's highly publicized departure for Sirius Satellite Radio forced a relaunch. In 2006, it became WFNY, the flagship station of CBS Radio's Free FM hot talk format. WFNY's failure resulted in the station reverting to rock in 2007 as WXRK with holdover morning hosts Opie and Anthony. In 2009, it again flipped to Top 40, first as "92.3 NOW", and then as "92.3 AMP Radio" WBMP in 2014. The day that CBS Radio's Reverse Morris Trust merger into Entercom closed in November 2017, WBMP was relaunched as alternative WNYL.

On October 27, 2022, the station switched to a full-time simulcast of WINS (1010 AM), and changed its call sign to WINS-FM.

== History ==
=== WMCA-FM and WHOM-FM (1948–1975) ===
The station launched as WMCA-FM at 2:30 pm on December 25, 1948, transmitting from atop the Chanin Building. It operated daily between 3 pm and 9 pm, duplicating programming that originally aired on its AM counterpart, WMCA; both stations were co-owned by former New York state senator Nathan Straus Jr. The FM station was not a profitable success, and in December 1949 officials announced the outlet would cease for economic reasons after sign-off on December 30. General manager Norman Boggs compared running the station to "having a champagne taste with a beer pocketbook." The announcement attracted interest from a syndicate of buyers headed by Stanley Joseloff, president of Storecast Corporation of America, acquired the station for $7,500 in February 1950.

In late 1950, the owners of WHOM acquired the station and WHOM-FM went on the air on February 26, 1951, featuring a variety of formats, including ethnic, background music, classical, Spanish, and easy listening. By the early 1970s, WHOM-FM aired a Spanish-language easy listening format.

=== WKTU (1975–1985) ===
==== Mellow 92/Disco 92 ====
In the early 1970s, WHOM and WHOM-FM were sold to SJR Communications. On June 5, 1975, WHOM-FM became WKTU, taking on an adult contemporary format and was positioned as "soft rock". On air, they were known as "Mellow 92". They played current adult contemporary songs that crossed over to top 40 as well as a mix of music from 1964 forward. Core artists included Eagles, Stevie Wonder, Elton John, James Taylor, Paul Simon, Stylistics, Linda Ronstadt, Four Tops, Carly Simon, Barry Manilow, and some more contemporary cuts by Barbra Streisand. For 1960s music, the station played softer songs from the Beatles, Mamas & Papas, Spanky and Our Gang, the Association, the 5th Dimension, among others. The station steered clear of adult contemporary-only songs and standards vocalists as well as hard rock or uptempo R&B. Eventually, the station evolved, re-positioned itself as mellow rock, dropped artists like the Carpenters and most R&B product and added some softer songs from AOR artists. Unlike today's adult contemporary music formats, WKTU, by early 1978, was only playing artists heard on album-oriented rock stations, using the softer songs from their popular albums. Artists found primarily on top 40 stations were no longer included. WKTU was still called "Mellow 92" at that point. Ratings were relatively low.

Meanwhile, station executive David Rapaport (father of actor Michael Rapaport) visited New York's Studio 54 nightclub on half a dozen occasions, and was very impressed with the crowds there. He got the idea that a disco-based station was needed, as several FM-based top 40 stations were leaning disco in other markets, although no one was airing all disco music around the clock. As a result, Rapaport purchased 200 disco records and brought them into the station. WKTU abruptly flipped to a disco-based rhythmic top 40 format with the tagline "Disco 92" at 6 pm on July 24, 1978. The same disc jockeys from the mellow format were at first kept on, with Paco (full name Paco Navarro) from Spanish language sister station 1480 WJIT added for evenings. That fall, the station rose from "Worst to First", unseating long-time leader WABC in the 18−30 age demographic. Air personalities of this era included Kenn Hayes, Randy Place, Paul Robinson, Trip Reeb, Mary Thomas, Dave Mallow and Joe Guarisco. During the height of the disco craze, WKTU was the station to follow in New York.

Initially, WKTU played mostly dance/disco and a few rhythm-friendly pop and rock songs (such as "Miss You" by The Rolling Stones for example), but by 1979, the station began to add more R&B music (though they played some at the launch in 1978 as well) as well as rhythm friendly new wave rock. By then, WKTU was still regarded as a disco station, but could be more accurately described as rhythmic contemporary. Since that term was not yet used, the station had been classified as urban contemporary. During this period, the disc jockeys included Paco, G. Keith Alexander, Rosko (William Mercer), J.D. Holiday (Paul Zarcone), Dale Reeves, Bob Bottone, Jim Harlan, Carlos DeJesus, Joe Causi, Guy Broady, Jay Thomas, Freddie Colon, Don Geronimo, Al Bandiero and Diane Pryor. Paco later went to jail for drug dealing.

==== 92KTU (1981–1985) ====
In 1981, SJR Communications sold WKTU to Infinity Broadcasting (which merged with CBS Radio in 1997). Also that year, WKTU added more dance-based new wave to the format. WKTU remained among the top ten New York City radio stations through 1983. Shortly thereafter, WKTU received new competition from WHTZ and WPLJ, both of which adapted a contemporary hit radio (CHR) format. The station maintained respectable but declining ratings, due to the new competition.

By mid-1984, WKTU moved to a mainstream CHR format as well, giving up its disco past, but the ratings continued to decline. That fall, the station added legendary WABC host Dan Ingram to afternoons, and Jo "The Madame" Maeder, from Miami's Y-100, joined Jay Thomas in the morning and did her own midday show, but the station continued to struggle in the ratings. To make matters worse, then-named WAPP also went CHR that fall.

So strong was the memory of the late-1970s WKTU that despite all the subsequent on-air changes, the general public still regarded it as a disco station. Even though WAPP moved back to playing mostly rock music in the form of a rock-based CHR in June 1985, giving WKTU one less competitor, the station management thought a more drastic change was needed. Since New York City only had one full-time rock station with WNEW-FM, there was an opportunity.

=== WXRK (1985–2005) ===
==== 92.3 K-Rock ====
On July 13, 1985, at midnight, on the same day WKTU aired the historic Live Aid concert, the station switched to an album-oriented rock format, adopted the moniker "K-Rock", and changed their call letters to WXRK. (The WKTU call letters later reappeared on New York City's 103.5 FM with a dance pop format in 1996.)

Initially, the format at WXRK was similar to the pre-1983 WPLJ, as the air personalities left the station gradually in the next several months (exceptions were Maria Malito and Jo Maeder, who became known as "The Rock and Roll Madame"). Jimmy Fink from WPLJ was one of the first new radio personalities to be hired. After being fired from WNBC in October 1985, Howard Stern signed on to do afternoons, and initially combined music with talk, but on February 18, 1986, Stern took over the morning slot. His morning show became the highest-rated in the market, dethroning Don Imus, who previously had the highest-rated morning show for several years on WNBC. Later that year, Stern's show became syndicated, with WXRK as its flagship station.

By 1987, Stern stopped playing music on his show altogether, while the station changed to a classic rock format at 6 pm on June 5 of that same year. The airstaff, which included Flo & Eddie from classic rock band The Turtles, became full of veterans from other New York rock stations, including Dave Herman, Pete Fornatale, Meg Griffin, Vin Scelsa, and Alison Steele from WNEW-FM, along with Jimmy Fink, Tony Pigg, Marc Coppola, and John Zacherle from WPLJ. In 1993, The Greaseman's syndicated show was put in the nighttime slot, bookending Stern with an act that was often quite controversial.

By the mid-1990s, modern rock had become popular. In mid-1993, in New York City radio, WHTZ began to play a lot of modern rock despite primarily being a CHR station. Late in 1993, classical music station WNCN switched formats and became WAXQ ("Q 104.3"), with a mix of hard and modern rock. Moreover, WNEW-FM switched to a modern rock format in the summer of 1995, and later evolved to first an adult-based modern rock format by the end of that year, and then to a more eclectic adult rock mix by 1996. Nevertheless, by the beginning of 1996, there was no full-time modern rock station in New York City.

To fill the void, WXRK switched to an alternative-leaning active rock format on January 5, 1996, right after Stern's show. To kick off the new format, which he enthusiastically endorsed as a better fit for his audience, Stern stayed on the air until 1:06 pm that day playing music. The first song Stern played was Marilyn Manson's cover of "Sweet Dreams (Are Made of This)". Most of the classic rock DJs, including Jimmy Fink, Tony Pigg and Marc Coppola, disappeared from the station with this change, as did The Greaseman. By August 1997, the station added more music that suited an active rock station and removed pop-leaning alternative product (which they played very little of anyway), and it continued this format of a hybrid active rock/alternative for several years.

By 2003, with a new program director, the station dropped the active rock variant of music. No matter what the format, the longtime problem for the station was that while Stern always had very high ratings, the rest of the station did not fare as well. Moreover, it was hard to classify "K-Rock" an alternative station (considering classic rock acts like Led Zeppelin were being played), while it was hard to label it as active rock due to the inclusion of some, but not all, alternative artists.

Concerned about Stern's move to Sirius Satellite Radio at the beginning of 2006, and acknowledging that its target audience was looking elsewhere for modern rock music, WXRK made another format adjustment on April 4, 2005, to a mainstream rock format, which relied heavily on classic rock from artists such as Guns N' Roses, Metallica, The Smashing Pumpkins, and Nirvana, while playing new music from such established artists as System of a Down, Nine Inch Nails, Green Day and Weezer. At this time, New York City was one of the few large cities in the United States without an alternative rock station. To prevent any backlash from fans of modern rock, an Internet-only radio station called "K-Rock2" was launched at the same time as the format adjustment. The strategy did not work, as ratings did not improve much.

On October 25, 2005, as a result of the imminent departure of Howard Stern to Sirius Satellite Radio, Infinity announced that WXRK would adopt a Hot talk format on January 3, 2006.

At 10 am on Friday, December 16, after the last terrestrial Howard Stern show, "K-Rock" began a 20-minute stunt with a melange of audio sound bites, music and program line-up announcements. At 10:20, K-Rock DJ Julie Slater announced "Welcome to Free FM", and went into music.

=== WFNY-FM (2006–2007) ===
==== 92.3 Free-FM ====
The WXRK call letters were replaced by WFNY-FM (standing for "Free New York") on January 1, 2006, with the official "Free FM" launch two days later at 6 am. The station, which was one of several CBS Radio stations around the nation branded as "Free FM", featured rock singer David Lee Roth as its morning show host. Other talk shows from hosts such as The Dog House with JV & Elvis, Penn Jillette, Leslie Gold, Chris Booker, and Jake Fogelnest & Jackie Clarke aired weekdays, while an active rock music format continued to be played on weekends, called "Free Rock Weekends."

Simultaneously, the WXRK call sign moved to the former WXTM in Cleveland, also owned by Infinity/CBS Radio, and coincidentally at the same 92.3 frequency, and was rebranded as "92.3 K-Rock."

WFNY's ratings plummeted with the change to an all-talk format. As the replacement for Howard Stern, Roth lost nearly three-quarters of Stern's previous audience, dropping a 7.9 share to a 1.8. Among the core audience—18- to 34-year-old men—the numbers fell from 13.8 to 1.3. Overall station ratings went from 3.2 in Summer/Fall of 2005 to 2.7 in Winter of 2006, and later to a 2.0, leaving it in 20th place in the New York market.

After moving from afternoon drive to evenings, on April 25, 2006, Chris Booker, host of The Booker Show, announced that he was broadcasting his last show on Free FM. He soon moved over the morning show at WIOQ in Philadelphia. The abrupt end of his show, which had evolved to afternoon drive before the format switch, led the station to revert to "Free Rock" music at nights.

The following day, on April 26, 2006, Opie and Anthony replaced David Lee Roth in morning drive on Free FM, while simulcasting on XM Satellite Radio. The show aired from 6 am to 9 am on both terrestrial and satellite radio, then continued on XM exclusively to 11 am. CBS would syndicate the show to several stations around the U.S., with WFNY/WXRK as its flagship.

By spring 2007, Opie and Anthony managed to slightly improve WFNY-FM's ratings to a 1.4. However, this performance left the radio station ranked No. 22 of 25 in the New York City market.

Weekends continued to use the "Free Rock Weekend" format, which included hour-long "Freecasts" in which a single listener chose the (approximately 15) songs played during the hour. The listener also acted as guest DJ over the phone during that time.

The station was also used as a secondary broadcaster of sister station WFAN, serving as a secondary outlet for NFL football games, New Jersey Devils hockey games and New Jersey Nets basketball games when there was a conflict with another game on WFAN.

After Jim Cramer's Real Money went off the air in December 2006, WFNY-FM was left with just four talk shows (one from syndication). As a result, the station attempted to revamp its lineup with the addition of several new talk shows, the first of which occurred on December 20, 2006. Ron and Fez, who also had a show on XM, signed an agreement to broadcast a Free FM-exclusive radio show from 6 pm to 9 pm. Ron and Fez had previously been employed by CBS at WNEW-FM shortly after that station switched to Hot talk in 1999.

Additional new shows soon followed. On December 28, 2006, John and Jeff started being broadcast from syndication out of sister station KLSX in Los Angeles, broadcasting live from 2 am to 6 am. On January 2, 2007, Larry Wachs, who was half of The Regular Guys morning show on WKLS-FM in Atlanta, began hosting the 10 pm to midnight slot on the station for two weeks. That same day, Nick DiPaolo became host of the noon to 3 pm time slot. He had done some preview shows the previous week. Beginning January 3, Loveline with Dr. Drew Pinsky & Stryker aired in late nights, tape delayed, from midnight to 2 am.

Danni was Free FM's music director and was still a Free Rock disc jockey. She has been heard doing DJ shifts on co-owned Fresh 102.7 as well. "Free Rock Weekends" aired from 6 am. Saturday – Midnight Sunday, and 6 am. Sunday – 2 am Monday. Game Show Radio ran midnight–2 am on Sundays, while infomercials ran from 2 am–6 am Sunday.

Free FM was using guest hosts for the 10 pm to midnight time slot. March 2, 2007, was the last day for the Penn Jillette show on "Free FM" and CBS Radio stations. The following Monday, WFNY-FM expanded the guest host time slot by an hour, making it 9 pm to midnight.

In April 2007, during an interview with a local band, A Brief Smile, on The Dog House, hosts JV and Elvis directed numerous homophobic insults at the band's bassist. The hosts referred to the bassist as "Fag Number 1" and asked, "How many badges of honor do you have in your colon?" and kicked him out of the studio. After playing a song by the band the hosts also called the bass part "a little faggy." The bass player returned to the studio, stated he was bisexual and that he found their use of the word "faggot" offensive. Gay rights groups such as GLAAD criticized the show as being homophobic for their remarks.

JV and Elvis were later suspended on April 30, over a six-minute prank phone call peppered with ethnic and sexual slurs to a Chinese restaurant, after numerous Chinese American advocacy groups complained to CBS demanding the hosts be fired.

Beginning May 7, Free FM started using guest hosts 9 am to noon to replace The Dog House. On May 12, 2007, AP News reported that CBS Radio spokeswoman Karen Mateo said, "The Dog House with JV and Elvis will no longer be broadcast [on Free-FM]." CBS fired JV and Elvis as well as the producer of The Dog House, after numerous complaints were received from various civil rights groups.

On May 15, 2007, XM Satellite Radio suspended the Opie and Anthony Show for 30 days because of comments made by a homeless man about raping Secretary of State Condoleezza Rice and First Lady Laura Bush made on an uncensored May 9 broadcast. Their suspension was effective immediately. During this time, CBS Radio kept the show on from 6 am to 9 am. However, it was not simulcast on XM.

=== Re-launch for WXRK (2007–2009) ===
==== K-Rock returns ====
At 9 am on May 24, 2007, after Opie and Anthony, an eight-hour countdown clock began on the former Free FM website, while WFNY-FM began stunting with a sound collage. The stunting came to an end at 4:57 pm with a statement from general manager Tom Chiusano, who apologized to listeners for taking K-Rock away. Minutes later, at 5 p.m, K-Rock was relaunched on 92.3 FM, playing an alternative rock format with a playlist focused on rock from the 1990s and 2000s, along with heavy classic rock. The first song on the resurrected K-Rock was "All Apologies" by Nirvana, while the first host on air was Gregg "Opie" Hughes of Opie and Anthony, who confirmed that the show would still be on the station under its new format.

The station reverted to its previous call letters, WXRK, on May 31, 2007. The previous WXRK (92.3 K-Rock in Cleveland, also owned by CBS Radio) received the callsign WKRI. The Cleveland station is now WKRK-FM.

Initially, WXRK had no on-air staff, although on Mondays it featured a Hostile Takeover show where guest(s) sat in as the DJ. The station also had contests which begun after Opie and Anthony.

On February 8, 2008, it was announced that program director Tracy Cloherty was among the many non-programming staffers let go by CBS Radio, in an attempt to "more effectively monetize the aggregate number of listeners who hear us on the radio and the Internet." The advent of WRXP caused WXRK to morph to active rock at that time.

In December 2008, as a result of another change in the station's management, WXRK made an adjustment to a mainstream rock format focusing more on classic rock and playing even less current rock songs. With the format adjustment, Paul Turner, who was the voice of the Howard Stern Show and K-Rock when it was a classic rock station in the 1990s, returned as voice of the station's promos.

As a result of the format shift, on December 16, 2008, FMQB announced that afternoon jock Ian Camfield had left K-Rock to go back to XFM in London. K-Rock vet Chris Booker took his place, airing in afternoon drive from 2 to 7 pm.

Due to low ratings, the final terrestrial airing of the Opie and Anthony show aired on March 9, 2009.

=== 92.3 Now (2009–2014) ===
At 4:45 pm on March 11, 2009, after playing a block of goodbye-themed or departure themed songs, ending with Nirvana's "All Apologies" (a near-bookend to the format's 2007 relaunch) and "Right Now" by Van Halen, WXRK began stunting with the sound of a ticking clock. At 4:55 pm, the station announced that K-Rock was moving to 92.3 HD2, and after an introductory package, officially flipped to a rhythmic-leaning CHR format, branded as 92.3 Now. The first song on Now was "Boom Boom Pow" by The Black Eyed Peas. Nick Cannon was morning host on the station from January 2010 to February 2012.

By July 2012, major directional changes were made with a shift to a more mainstream Top 40 format. The station also added Ty Bentli for mornings. This would eventually become known as "Ty Loves NY."

On November 8, 2012, a full 3 1/2 years after the launch of the Top 40/CHR format, the station changed call letters to WNOW-FM to match the Now moniker. This was made possible by a format and call-letter change at the former WNOW-FM in Gaffney, South Carolina.

==== Howard Stern returns ====
On January 17, 2012, Howard Stern made a live appearance on WXRK for the first time in over six years. Stern was a guest on the Nick Cannon morning show, via telephone, at the same time as Cannon was guesting on Stern's SiriusXM Satellite Radio show.

==== Hurricane Sandy ====
As a result of damage suffered to WINS's transmitter during Hurricane Sandy, WINS made its first appearance on 92.3 broadcasting on the frequency for two days. Although its transmitters were restored, WINS's transmitters were on low power for at least a day. The simulcast ended at 10 am on October 31, 2012, when WINS's transmitter went back to full power.

=== 92.3 AMP Radio (2014–2017) ===
Logo of 92.3 AMP Radio

Following the station's flip in 2009, WXRK/WNOW would typically hold only a 2 share of the New York market as compared to WHTZ, which usually has a 7 share of the market. In addition, WXRK/WNOW had a constant turnover of program directors and airstaff, including the sudden releasing of all the then-current airstaff (with the exception of midday host Niko and evening host Toro) on May 21, 2014, as rumors of a complete rehauling of WNOW's format abounded. The following day at 2 pm, after stunting by giving away $1,000 to callers every 9 minutes for 2 hours, WNOW-FM relaunched as 92.3 AMP Radio under veteran PD Rick Thomas, launching with commercial-free weekends until Labor Day weekend. The final song on "Now" was "Lose Yourself" by Eminem, while the first song on "AMP" was "Summer" by Calvin Harris. On June 23, 2014, WNOW-FM changed its call letters to WBMP to match the "AMP" branding (unlike Los Angeles sister station KAMP-FM, the WAMP call letters are held by an American Family Radio religious talk radio station in Jackson, Tennessee, and the network's conservative foundational owner was unlikely to give them to a commercial operation). Concurrently, the WNOW-FM call letters were transferred to WNOU in Indianapolis. After the rebrand, the station's ratings improved significantly. On January 22, 2015, WBMP launched a new morning show titled Shoboy in the Morning with Edgar "Shoboy" Sotelo, Micho Rizzo (both of whom were once part of sister station KMVK in Dallas) and Nina Hajian from then-sister station KZZO in Sacramento.

=== Alt 92.3 (2017–2022) ===
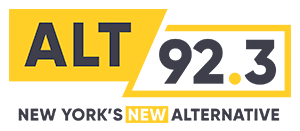
Logo as "Alt 92.3" (2017–2022), now available on the HD2 subchannel.

On February 2, 2017, CBS Radio announced it would merge with Entercom (now Audacy). The merger was approved on November 9, 2017, and was completed on November 17. On November 17, at 10 am, after playing "Too Good at Goodbyes" by Sam Smith and "Encore" by Brooklyn native Jay-Z, WBMP flipped back to alternative as Alt 92.3, launching with "My Hero" by the Foo Fighters. The switch marked the return of the format to the market for the first time since 2012, when WRXP switched to a simulcast of WFAN as WFAN-FM after its sale to CBS. A sister "AMP" station in Dallas, KVIL, also flipped to alternative with a similar brand the same day. On June 12, 2018, the call letters were changed to WNYL to match their format.

On September 13, 2020, WNYL became the primary station of Entercom's alternative stations across the United States, with its programming airing on most of those stations and local staffs being let go.

The station's morning team of "Cane and Corey" (which also aired nationwide through several stations) was terminated in mid-December 2021 for dishonesty involving profanity going out over the airwaves, non-compliance with COVID-19 vaccine rules, and launching a Patreon and Spotify podcast without notifying Audacy (which has its own podcast platform and holds contractual exclusivity for any podcasts from its employees); the hosts also told that unauthorized podcast audience that a flip to an FM simulcast of WINS was being considered by local management if ratings did not improve (Audacy had done so for most of its all-news stations, the previous being KNOU in Los Angeles becoming KNX-FM days before). On April 11, 2022, WNYL became the New York City affiliate for the Washington, D.C.–based Elliot in the Morning.

=== WINS simulcast (since 2022) ===
On October 10, 2022, Audacy officially announced it would flip WNYL to a simulcast of WINS beginning on October 27 at 9 am (while concurrently reaching an agreement with the SAG-AFTRA union to begin combining the staffs of WINS and WCBS). The "Alt" format would continue through the station's HD2 subchannel and Audacy stream.

Beginning on October 20, WNYL paid tribute to the run of "Alt", as well as the history of the rock format on the frequency, running music with a specific focus of one hourly-changed year of the format (ironically focusing on music that, while playing under the run of the "Alt" format, may not have played on the 92.3 frequency itself in that span, as the rock format was focused on progressive and album rock for most of its run; nevertheless, the DJs would still refer to the station as "K-Rock" besides the regular brand as a further nod). The station signed off the "Alt" format with a special 3-hour goodbye show with many former station staffers visiting or calling in to the station and paying tribute to the format. The "Alt" format officially signed off with "New York, I Love You But You're Bringing Me Down" by the Brooklyn-based band LCD Soundsystem. Following a 10-minute transition period, the simulcast formally launched at 9 am. Concurrently, Audacy applied for the WINS-FM call letters for the station; the call sign change took effect on October 27.

== "K-Rock2" and HD radio operations ==
As part of the K-Rock format change on April 4, 2005, from alternative rock to mainstream rock, "K-Rock2", a new Internet-only radio station, was created. Throughout the Free FM period and during the resurrection of K-Rock, "K-Rock2" continued to stream on krock2.com. Following the main channel's format change to "Now" on March 11, 2009, the HD2 channel became known as simply "K-Rock", but retained the alternative rock format. "K-Rock HD2", at one point had a full-time air staff, including a local music show, but later ran completely automated.

Starting shortly after 2 am on October 6, 2008, the "K-Rock2" audio stream was added to WXRK-HD2. A few minutes earlier, a simulcast of sister station WFAN was added to WXRK-HD3. 92.3-HD3 was initially using the delayed audio feed from wfan.com complete with internet only commercials and not the over the air broadcast feed used by WFAN on 660 AM. After a day or so, WXRK-HD3 switched to the over the air feed of WFAN, but still had a time delay of over a minute. The HD3 was dropped altogether when WFAN began simulcasting on 101.9 FM on November 2, 2012. In December 2015, WBMP added Radio Disney to their HD3 channel under a time brokerage agreement, marking the return of the radio network to New York since Radio Disney's owned-and-operated WQEW (now WFME) was sold to Family Radio in February of that year. The Radio Disney feed would be discontinued in June 2018 after the agreement between Disney and Entercom, which inherited the agreement from CBS, expired. After the analog/HD1 channel's flip back to alternative in November 2017, the HD2 channel changed to a simulcast of sister station WNEW-FM. In October 2018, the HD2 channel flipped to new alternative as "New Arrivals". In October 2022, the HD2 channel adopted the alternative format and the "Alt 92.3" moniker from the former analog/HD1 signal.

In February 2019, Audacy's Channel Q, an LGBTQ-centric talk/dance network, was launched on its third subchannel.

On March 1, 2024, it was announced that WINS-FM-HD2 would be the new home for Spanish language broadcasts of the New York Mets.

On September 16, 2024, WINS-HD3 began carrying Scott Shannon's True Oldies Channel without any local variation. The subchannel had previously carried Audacy's LGBTQ music service, "Channel Q." That service is now heard on co-owned 102.7 WNEW-FM-HD2.

== See also ==
- WKTU: the "new" WKTU started in 1996 on 103.5 MHz.
