= Richard Hake =

American journalist and reporter (1969–2020)

- Born: January 4, 1969; Bronx, New York City, New York
- Died: April 24, 2020 (aged 51); New York City
- Education: Fordham University

Richard Hake (January 4, 1969 – April 24, 2020) was a journalist and reporter for WNYC, where he was one of the hosts of the weekly morning program, Morning Edition.

== Biography ==
WNYC, New York Public Radio, where Richard Hake worked for 29 years.

Richard Scott Hake was born in the Bronx on January 4, 1969, to Richard James Hake, a New York City police detective, and Joy Mekland, a clerical worker and secretary. Hake had two brothers and one sister. He graduated from Carmel High School (Carmel, New York) in 1987, then from Fordham University in 1991, and began working at NPR in 1991 while still at Fordham. He became a news host and reporter at WNYC in 1992. He was openly gay.

He spent 28 years working as a radio news host, reporter, and producer. He featured on several local and national NPR programs, such as Morning Edition (which he hosted), Weekend Edition, All Things Considered, and On the Media. He also broadcast on MTV, the BBC, WCBS, WBGO, WOR, and WFUV radio. Hake hosted for MTV's Logo Network's The Advocate News magazine program. His documentary work includes "The Perfume of the Bronx" and the "Coney Island Cyclone Anniversary."

For his reporting, Hake was awarded accolades from the Associated Press Broadcasters Association and the Society of Professional Journalists. Hake made his Broadway debut as a chimney sweep in Mary Poppins.

Hake died on April 24, 2020, at age 51, in his Upper East Side home. His manner of death was ruled to be a result of an accident, according to the city's Medical Examiner.
