= WFAN-FM =

Sports radio station in New York City

Simulcast with WFAN, New York City
- New York, New York; United States
- Broadcast area: New York metropolitan area
- Frequency: 101.9 MHz (HD Radio)
- Branding: WFAN Sports Radio 66 and 101.9 FM, The Fan

Programming
- Language: English
- Format: Sports radio
- Subchannels: HD2: Westwood One Sports; HD3: BetMGM Network
- Affiliations: Brooklyn Nets; New York Giants; New York Yankees; Rutgers Scarlet Knights; Westwood One Sports

Ownership
- Owner: Audacy, Inc.; (Audacy License, LLC)
- Sister stations: WCBS-FM; WFAN; WHSQ; WINS; WINS-FM; WNEW-FM; WXBK

History
- First air date: October 31, 1940
- Former call signs: W2XWF (1940); W55NY (1941–1943); WFGG (1943–1945); WGHF (1945–1955); WBFM (1955–1964); WPIX-FM (1964–1988); WQCD (1988–2008); WRXP (2008–2011); WEMP (2011–2012); WRXP (2012)
- Former frequencies: 42.18 MHz (1940–1941); 45.5 MHz (1941–1946); 99.7 MHz (1946–1947)
- Call sign meaning: Sports fanatic

Technical information
- Licensing authority: FCC
- Facility ID: 67846
- Class: B
- ERP: 6,000 watts
- HAAT: 415 meters (1,362 ft)
- Transmitter coordinates: 40°44′54.4″N 73°59′8.5″W

Links
- Public license information: Public file; LMS
- Webcast: Listen live (via Audacy)
- Website: www.audacy.com/wfan

WFAN-FM (101.9 MHz) is a commercial FM radio station licensed to New York, New York. Owned by Audacy, Inc., the station simulcasts a sports radio format known as "Sports Radio 66 AM and 101.9 FM", or "The FAN", along with co-owned WFAN (660 AM). Its studios are in the Audacy facility in the Hudson Square neighborhood of Lower Manhattan.

WFAN-FM has an effective radiated power (ERP) of 6,000 watts, transmitting from atop the Empire State Building. WFAN-FM broadcasts using HD Radio technology. Its HD digital subchannels carry Audacy's national sports networks, Westwood One Sports and BetMGM.

== History ==
=== Early years ===
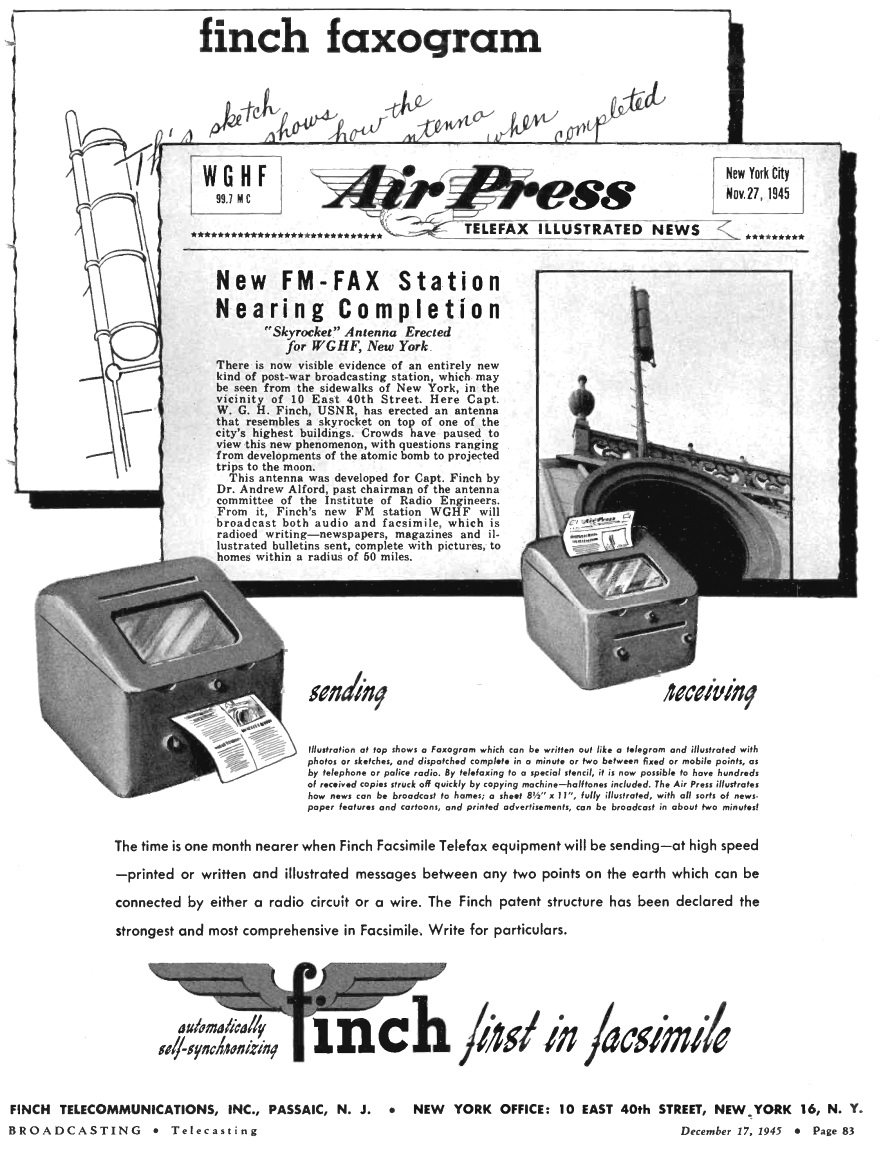
December 1945 station advertisement as WGHF, featuring the station's experimental broadcast facsimile service.

The station traces its origin to an experimental Apex band radio station, W2XWF on 42.18 MHz, which was authorized in 1940 and licensed to radio engineer William G. H. Finch.

In May 1940, the Federal Communications Commission (FCC) announced the establishment, effective January 1, 1941, of an FM radio band operating on 40 channels spanning 42–50 MHz. On October 31, 1940, the first 15 construction permits for commercial FM stations were issued, including one to W. G. H. Finch for a station in New York City on 45.5 MHz, which was issued the call sign W55NY. Effective November 1, 1943, the FCC modified its policy for FM call signs, and the station was assigned the call sign WFGG, which was changed to WGHF in 1945. One of the uses of the station was to test Finch's sub-carrier facsimile system. By 1946, the station was broadcasting on 99.7 MHz, moving to 101.9 in 1947.

In late 1948, it became the New York City affiliate of the farm-oriented Rural Radio Network based in Ithaca, New York, which owned a group of upstate stations that would later associate with WQXR. In 1955, its then-owner, Muzak, changed the call sign to WBFM. The station aired a soft instrumental beautiful music radio format.

=== WPIX-FM ===
A WPIX-FM logo from the mid-1970s.

The station was purchased by the New York Daily News in late 1963. WBFM adopted the call sign WPIX-FM on October 11, 1964, as the station was now co-owned with television station WPIX (channel 11).

Broadcasting from the "Pix Penthouse" on the 28th floor of the Daily News Building, WPIX-FM ushered in what was to become one of the most popular formats in FM radio, easy listening (later adult contemporary music), signaling the end of the dominance of beautiful music, jazz, classical and block programming on the FM band. WPIX-FM would be noted for not being able to settle on a format for any real length of time, and was derisively nicknamed "the format of the month station" by many in the New York City radio industry. The station went through 11 different formats during its post-easy listening period:

- 1971–1975; 1976–1977: Adult top 40 - a top 40 format at the time that played new songs less often than top 40 leader WABC. While still focused on current music, it mixed in rock and roll oldies from about 1964 to what were then recent.
- 1975: Top 40/disco. The New York Times reported, "Characterized by a strong bass, a simple melody, and terse repetitive lyrics...'Disco,' as this music is called...is becoming increasingly popular on AM and FM radio stations. WPIX-FM recently switched several hours of its nightly programming over to 'disco.'" The nightly show "Disco 102" was first hosted by "Doctor" Jerry Carroll, then by Howard Hoffman when Carroll moved to afternoons. By the summer of 1976, the station was back to a gold leaning top 40 format which was popular on FM stations at the time.
- 1977–1978: Top 40/rock music.
- During this time, Mark Simone launched "The Simone Phone", a pioneering FM comedy talk show featuring then-producer/writer Tom Leykis, that contained popular features such as "Dial-A-Date", which were later borrowed by other radio shows. Simone moved to WMCA in 1979.
- 1978–1980: New wave music/punk rock. At a time when other rock stations in New York were sticking with traditional AOR formats (WPLJ, WNEW-FM), adult Top 40 (WXLO) and oldies (WCBS-FM), WPIX staked out a groundbreaking format focused on new wave and punk but included older rock and roll as well, hence its advertising slogan: "From Elvis to Elvis" (meaning Elvis Presley to Elvis Costello.) It helped break in New York and nationally early records by Costello, The Police, Nick Lowe, The Clash, The Cars, Squeeze, Devo, The Kings, Iggy Pop, Lou Reed, Buzzcocks, Cheap Trick, Talking Heads, David Johansen, Tom Verlaine and Richard Lloyd, among others. The station was even featured in lyrics from the Squeeze song, 'I Think I'm Go Go' (P I X and rock and roll).
- March 1, 1980 – July 6, 1981: Rock-based top 40. A station spokesperson said WPIX-FM was "modifying the format to improve the product to make it more mass acceptable".
- July 6, 1981 – January 15, 1982: Album-oriented rock.
- January 15 – February 28, 1982: CHR (top 40). Basically a transitional format to adult contemporary.
- March 1982 – 1985: Adult contemporary music. Beginning in January 1983, WPIX-FM positioned itself as "nothing but love songs". A series of TV commercials featuring clay animation cherubs, and starring artists such as the Pointer Sisters, Bette Midler, Sheena Easton and Carly Simon were credited with bringing new listeners to the station. The tagline was, "Your ex wants you back!"
- 1985: Hot adult contemporary, a mix of love songs and eclectic music as "the ballads and beat of New York". Also in 1985, the station began running a nighttime show called "The PIX Penthouse", which played contemporary R&B and soul music as well as smooth jazz. It had been used through the 1960s as the station's tagline for its easy listening format. ("The PIX Penthouse Party" had been originally used as a program title during WPIX-FM's Punk/New Wave era and was notable for playing 1960s music that influenced Punk and New Wave Rock).
- August 16, 1986 – March 1987: Adult contemporary music/standards/AAA/smooth jazz — "The Bright and Lively Sound of New York".
- March - September 1987: Hot adult contemporary during the day and urban adult contemporary/smooth jazz evenings.
- September 1987 – August 10, 1988: Hot adult contemporary during the day and overnights using "Easy Rock" as a slogan. Smooth jazz in the evenings.

Notable air personalities during the WPIX-FM period included Mark Simone, Alan Colmes, Meg Griffin, Ted David and Jerry Carroll (a.k.a. "Dr. Jerry"). Another WPIX-FM personality, Ken Harper, host of the all-night "Manhattan After Hours", from 1964 to 1968, went on to produce "The Wiz" on Broadway.

The station gave up quickly on both the Disco and the Punk/New Wave formats, only to see both genres of music become popular several years later.

From 1966 to 1988, WPIX-FM simulcast the Christmas music played during WPIX television's annual Yule Log program on Christmas Eve and Christmas morning.

=== CD101.9 ===
Beginning with "The PIX Penthouse" in 1985, WPIX-FM started to play contemporary jazz after dark to boost its nighttime ratings, and beginning in September 1987, the station's evening programming was entirely dedicated to the genre. Then, on August 10, 1988, the station adopted a jazz-based adult contemporary format during the day and retained all jazz at night.

Later that month, on August 22, the station modified into a full-time smooth jazz radio format, with the new call letters WQCD and the new branding, "CD 101.9". While the genre had varying degrees of presence on most Top 40 and AC stations at the time, New York City had not had a full-time commercial jazz station since 1980, when WRVR (106.7 FM, now WLTW) became country music station WKHK following an ownership change two years earlier. The re-launch of 101.9 was accompanied by a new television advertising campaign which featured Al Jarreau, Miles Davis, Kenny G, Bobby McFerrin and Herb Alpert–all artists whose music formed the core of the new smooth jazz format, which proved successful and long-lasting for a station that had not been used to stability in its programming.

WQCD's early music blend featured contemporary jazz mixed with soft rock and urban adult contemporary, along with some new-age music (the "CD" branding came from the station promoting that it played between 70 and 80 minutes of music between commercial breaks, the length of an average compact disc). The station programmed an equal balance between vocal and instrumental music. At night the station played strictly contemporary jazz music, with a majority of it instrumental. As time went on, WQCD phased-out soft-rock cuts and became a full-time contemporary jazz station. The playlist continued to feature large amounts of instrumental jazz, with some new age, and several urban adult contemporary songs. This formula would largely be unchanged for over 15 years.

When the Daily News changed ownership in 1991 and was sold to Robert Maxwell, WQCD and WPIX were retained by the newspaper's former corporate parent, the Tribune Company. In 1997, Tribune sold WQCD to Emmis Communications. The combination of WQCD and Emmis's two existing New York stations, WQHT (97.1 FM) and WRKS-FM 98.7, gave the Indianapolis-based company an FM triopoly in the New York market. In 1998, Emmis moved WQCD out of the Daily News Building, and along with WQHT and WRKS into a newly constructed common facility at 395 Hudson Street.

WQCD ran an experiment from November 22, 2004, until August 2005, when the station's playlist included chill music, a relaxing sound based on the music found on the beaches of Ibiza. The ratings were not satisfactory, and the experiment ended. The station retained the tagline, "CD101.9, Your Chill-Out Station" during its successful transition back to the standard smooth jazz format. WQCD's on-air staff remained unusually stable in the generally volatile radio climate, led by morning host Dennis Quinn. Midday host Deborah Rath had been with parent company Emmis since 1988, as a veteran of both WRKS and WQHT. Afternoon drive host Paul Cavalconte was a veteran of New York jazz, classical, and rock stations, adult standards WNEW. Evening host Sharon Davis called WQCD home for nearly a decade. Other notable long-term airstaff members include Ray White, Pat Prescott, Russ Davis, Steve Harris, Ian Karr, Maria Von Dickersohn, Meryl Kubrick and John Vidaver. Rafe Gomez hosted "The Groove Boutique", a nationally syndicated groove jazz mix show that aired on Saturday nights beginning in 2003. "The Groove Boutique" was a finalist in the 2005 Best Mix Show category of the 8th annual New York Radio Market Achievements in Radio (A.I.R.) awards.

=== 101.9 RXP ===
On February 5, 2008, at 4:00 pm, Emmis Communications announced a change to a rock format under the WRXP call letters and the tagline 101.9 RXP: The New York Rock Experience. The last songs played on "CD 101.9" were "Shining Star" by The Manhattans and an instrumental rendition of "Street Life" by U-Nam, while the first two songs played on "RXP" were "Rock and Roll" by Velvet Underground and "Supernatural Superserious" by R.E.M. With the exception of Paul Cavalconte, the entire WQCD air staff was released including Dennis Quinn, who had survived every other format change at 101.9 since joining the station in 1971. Only program director Blake Lawrence was retained from the previous format for WRXP. Emmis cited a declining audience for smooth jazz, which moved to the station's HD2 subchannel. (An online version of CD101.9 would eventually be launched in late summer 2015).

WRXP was the first alternative rock station in New York City since WXRK's format flip to active rock in April 2005. Even though classified as alternative rock (with a slight adult album alternative lean), Nielsen BDS and Mediabase reported WRXP as an AAA, with suburban station WXPK recognized as the main AAA station in the New York City market. By 2011, WRXP was classified as an alternative rock station by both Nielsen BDS and Mediabase.

WRXP's first on-air personality was Brian Schock. Until leaving the station to return to San Diego in January 2009, he was also the station's assistant program director and music director. Station management promised to hire a New York rock-savvy airstaff for the rest of the station's dayparts. Among those hired were veteran radio and MTV personality Matt Pinfield as the morning drive host; Steve Craig as midday host; and Brian Phillips as evening host. The weekend air staff included Dave Greek, Greg Russ and Jennifer Kajzer, as well as Cavalconte, the only personality retained from the WQCD smooth jazz format. In March 2009, WRXP announced that Nik Carter, formerly of WXRK, and later with VH1, joined as the station as its afternoon drive personality.

On June 16, 2008, Leslie Fram, formerly of WNNX in Atlanta, was appointed Program Director. She also co-hosted the WRXP morning drive (and later midday) show with Pinfield. On November 9, 2008, Anything Anything with Rich Russo debuted on the station.

=== Merlin Media ===
On June 21, 2011, it was announced that majority ownership of WRXP was acquired by Merlin Media LLC, a new entity headed by veteran radio executive Randy Michaels. The sale, which the Federal Communications Commission (FCC) approved in September 2011, included two other Emmis-owned stations in Chicago, WLUP-FM and WKQX. Merlin registered several domains for what the new format of the station would be, including a return of WYNY's country music format, but many suggested an all-news radio format.

All of WRXP's DJs, except for Cavalconte, were dismissed, and at 5 pm on July 15, 2011, WRXP's rock format ended with "Long Live Rock" by The Who. WRXP's website (MyRXP.com) continued operation after the station left the airwaves, offering its music format via streaming online audio and later a Spotify playlist (with occasional new songs added) until Merlin acquired the domain name.

After a brief period of dead air, WRXP (whose call sign was changed to WEMP on July 21) switched to a stunt of adult contemporary music branded as "101.9 FM New", which served as a transition to the station's new format. The first song on "FM New" was "All Summer Long" by Kid Rock. "101.9 FM New" featured a live morning show that began at 6:00 am on July 18, hosted by Paul Cavalconte (who had been with 101.9 since 1998), with Jeff McKay (a New York traffic reporter formerly of Shadow Traffic and WINS) providing traffic reports and weather updates (until the next day, when meteorologist Scott Derek began). News reports and news blocks were gradually introduced beginning with a 3 pm newscast on July 25, 2011, anchored by Dave Packer and Mike Barker.

=== FM News 101.9 ===
On August 12, 2011, the station ended its adult contemporary stint and became an all-news station as "FM News 101.9". It followed in the footsteps of its Chicago sister station WWWN (the former and current WKQX), which flipped to all-news on July 29. As conceived by Merlin's then-COO, Walter Sabo, "FM News" was what Sabo considered a "redefining" of the all-news format. The on-air presentation was generally looser and conversational in tone, while an emphasis was placed on lifestyle, health, and entertainment features. The initial news staff at WEMP included people with experience in New York radio, including WINS alums Catherine Smith, Alice Stockton-Rossini, and Brett Larson, as well as former WCBS anchor Therese Crowley and WRXP holdover Paul Cavalconte.

Over time, the "FM News" approach on WEMP was adjusted. The reliance on lifestyle and entertainment features was decreased. The station turned towards a tighter on-air presentation and hard news format. Several new features were added, including "10 minutes of non-stop news" at :00, :20 and :40 past the hour (similar to the fact that WINS delivers news headlines at these intervals), the "Top 5 Trending Stories" leading off every hour, with hourly sports and business updates.

The station also advertised "traffic and weather on the 5s". Coinciding with the on-air changes was a major promotional push, including television ads. Promotions tweaked WINS' longtime "22 minutes" slogan, with WEMP proclaiming "Give us 10 minutes, we'll give you the world." (After WINS owner CBS Radio sent a cease-and-desist letter to Merlin Media, WEMP dropped the slogan, and replaced it by "non-stop news".) Then, Merlin Media fought back against WINS by demanding that station not to call itself as "New York's One and Only All-News Station" (to highlighting its round-the-clock newswheel as opposed to WCBS carrying some live sports broadcasts). Merlin Media said this was misleading according to WEMP's format at the time.

In the time FM News was in operation, it was plagued by a variety of technical issues after management in Chicago decided to automate the news, much as some music stations automate their playlists. The controversial approach led to a number of on-air gaffes, including wrong time checks and news stories misplaced. The only live elements on the air were traffic reports, which were reportedly demanded by a manager at WEMP, despite the traffic reports being recorded by their Chicago sister station. The expanded traffic reports became one of the few successes of the radio station, and several months later, Chicago's "FM News 101.1" would also return to the live traffic reports.

WEMP and its all-news format struggled to make gains in Arbitron ratings. For example, in the period ending January 4, 2012, Arbitron rated WEMP at a 0.5, far behind both of the CBS Radio-owned all-news stations in New York, category leader WINS at 3.2 and WCBS at 2.8 in that month. (WEMP's share was lower than one of the last ratings books for WRXP, a 2.6 share in July 2011.)

=== New Rock 101.9 ===
In July 2012, there was speculation that Merlin Media would convert WEMP to a news/talk hybrid, similar to its sister stations in Philadelphia, WWIQ, and Chicago, WIQI, which was also struggling in ratings with all-news and had added some talk programming. Instead, Merlin had other plans for the station.

On July 17, 2012, at 10 am, Merlin management held meetings with the news staffs of both WEMP and WIQI. While the meeting took place, a pre-recorded newscast from earlier in the day on "FM News 101.9" was abruptly cut off and replaced by the reporting of one final story – an announcement that the all-news format was ending immediately.

"This is the final story being covered by FM News. It is to announce that a format change is about to occur at 101.9. In just a few moments, FM News will become New Rock 101.9. The final line of our final story is this: A special note of thanks to everyone involved with FM News for their passion and support. Sometimes just saying thank you isn't enough, but in this case, it'll have to do. Thank you... and good-bye".

After a brief period of dead air, WEMP then returned to an alternative rock format under the "New Rock 101.9" branding, with "No Sleep Till Brooklyn" by the Beastie Boys, as the first song played. (At the very same time, WIQI transitioned from all-news to adult hits.) In a press release, Merlin CEO Randy Michaels called dropping all-news from both WEMP and WIQI "a difficult decision to make" but one that had to be made in light of "minimal audience engagement". Most "FM News 101.9" staffers were released by Merlin, with a handful retained by the company to serve as reporters for Merlin's WWIQ in Philadelphia.

"New Rock 101.9" ("New Rock for New York") featured a playlist that included current and recent alternative rock songs and artists. The presentation included an irreverent attitude and the "backselling" (identification of artist and song title) at the end of many current songs. To coincide with the format change back to rock, Merlin Media made two noteworthy moves: It filed a request with the FCC on July 18 to revert the station's call sign from WEMP to WRXP. The call letters were officially changed on July 25. Merlin also obtained WRXP-related domain names from the station's previous owner, Emmis Communications, including MyRXP.com (which would redirect to the station's NewRock1019.com website). "New Rock 101.9" ran with limited on-air talent, including former WRXP host Brian Phillips on middays, with the possibility that other former 'RXP staffers would be invited to rejoin the station.

=== WFAN-FM ===
WRXP made some gains in the Arbitron ratings with its revived alternative format. The station jumped to a 1.6 share in July, and then to a 2.1 share in August. However, Merlin Media was faced with a high debt load from recent purchases and the cost of its failed news format. Additionally, one of Merlin's investors was seeking buyers for the company's stations.

Merlin announced on October 8, 2012, that it had agreed to sell WRXP to CBS Radio. With the purchase (estimated at $75 million), CBS said it would convert WRXP to a simulcast of its sports radio station, WFAN. The simulcast began at 11:57 pm on November 1, 2012, after Jeff Buckley's "Last Goodbye" brought a close to WRXP's "New Rock" format. A call sign change from WRXP to WFAN-FM took effect the next day, November 2. CBS operated WFAN-FM under a local marketing agreement (LMA) until closing its purchase on December 10, 2012. The LMA officially relieved Merlin Media of its only New York radio property and allowed it to concentrate on its stations in the Chicago and Philadelphia markets.

The purchase of 101.9 by CBS put WFAN back on equal footing with ESPN Radio affiliate WEPN, which made its own AM-to-FM move in April 2012 (to the former WRKS). It also improved daytime coverage for WFAN; for years, radio frequency interference had rendered it all but unlistenable in parts of Manhattan. Speculation at the time suggested that the move would also allow CBS to split the WFAN simulcast at a later date and ensure a full-power New York home for its new national sports network, CBS Sports Radio, which began daily programming in January 2013 (and would ultimately air on WFAN-FM's HD2 subchannel). Such a move would have mirrored CBS-owned sports talk pairings in markets such as Baltimore, where WJZ aired CBS Sports Radio full-time and WJZ-FM aired local sports talk. CBS (and later, Entercom) chose not to break the simulcast, with Cumulus Media's suburban station WFAS (1230) serving as the de facto CBS Sports Radio flagship instead.

On February 2, 2017, CBS Radio announced that it would merge with Entercom (now Audacy, Inc.). The merger was approved on November 9, 2017, and was consummated on November 17.
