= Vin Scelsa =

American broadcaster (born 1947)

- Born: Vincent Anthony Scelsa; December 12, 1947 (age 78); Bayonne, New Jersey
- Education: Upsala College
- Awards: ASCAP Deems Taylor Radio Broadcast Award
- Presenting career
- Stations: WPLJ WABC-FM; WNEW-FM; WXRK; WFUV; WFMU
- Style: Freeform
- Country: United States
- Previous show: Idiot's Delight

Vincent Anthony Scelsa (born December 12, 1947, in Bayonne, New Jersey) is an American broadcaster who was at "the forefront of the FM radio revolution" as the host of several freeform radio programs, the best-known titled Idiot's Delight. His eclectic mix of music, reviews, and lengthy interviews with authors and artists has established Scelsa as a fixture in late night New York City radio for decades.

== Early life ==
He attended Upsala College in East Orange, New Jersey, where he spent his early broadcasting years in several functions at the college's station, WFMU. He hosted his first show there in November 1967. Scelsa originally considered becoming a Jesuit priest before pursuing a career in radio.

== Radio career ==
=== 1970s–2000s: Commercial radio ===
Scelsa went on to work in commercial radio first on Long Island in the early 1970s at WLIR and at non-commercial WBAI-FM in New York City. He became road manager for singer-songwriter Townes Van Zandt and also worked for Poppy Records. On February 14, 1971, while he was music director and a DJ at WABC-FM, the station changed its call letters to WPLJ, an acronym for and homage to the song, performed by The Four Deuces in 1955 and the Mothers of Invention in 1970, called "White Port and Lemon Juice."

When WPLJ restricted the air personalities' ability to pick their own music to play, Scelsa moved to WNEW-FM 102.7 where he hosted late nights and evenings from 1973 through 1982. In 1981 he was namechecked on The Ramones' "It's Not My Place (In the 9 to 5 World)" on the album Pleasant Dreams. Similarly, when WNEW instituted fixed playlists for all personalities in 1982, Scelsa moved on again. He surfaced briefly once again at WLIR before devoting the next two years to off-air endeavors. He joined then-new rock station WXRK-FM 92.3 K-Rock in 1985 and hosted a freeform program there through the end of 1995. His Sunday night show at K-Rock became known as "Idiot's Delight," and many fans of the show participated in the online e-mail group "Idiot's Delight Digest."

In January 1996, K-Rock changed its format from classic rock to alternative rock (except for Howard Stern in the morning, who remained all talk). Scelsa opted to leave the station rather than restrict his playlist to the newer rock and shortly thereafter returned to WNEW-FM where he continued hosting "Idiot's Delight". For a period of time at WNEW, Vin channeled his doubts regarding the station's commitment to his show by playing a different version of the standards chestnut "I'll Be Seeing You" each week. Yet Vin remained in place at WNEW through several programming formats until the end of 2000.

During the last years of this WNEW stint, "Idiot's Delight" usually did not have a fixed ending time. Rather, the show was officially scheduled to run from 8:00 pm Sunday nights through 2:00 am Monday mornings, but in actuality ended as late as 4:30 am, depending upon when Vin felt the show had reached an appropriate conclusion. The final 'Idiots Delight' on WNEW was particularly memorable. It aired on December 31, 2000, and ended at around 3:30 am on January 1, 2001.

=== 2000s–2010s: Return to public radio, and satellite ===
Scelsa announced that "Idiot's Delight" was moving to noncommercial WFUV/90.7 FM. He also briefly hosted an internet only radio show called "Live at Lunch" during 2000 and 2001 which he broadcast from his home or from a custom-built studio at J&R Music World. His WFUV program was one of the few to not be streamed on the internet initially, because Scelsa preferred to be free of the online regulations of the period which limited the programming of multiple tracks from an artist or album without special permission.

In addition to the Saturday night WFUV broadcasts, Scelsa began hosting two additional hours of "Idiot's Delight" live on both Wednesday and Thursday afternoons for Sirius/XM Satellite Radio's "The Loft," (initially called Sirius Disorder). The four weekly hours of Sirius/XM shows are repeated early Friday mornings and on Sunday nights.

On his March 28, 2015, WFUV show, Scelsa announced he would be retiring from radio. His last show on SiriusXM aired on April 30, 2015, and his final radio show aired on WFUV on May 2, 2015.

== Other projects ==
Scelsa served as the music editor of Penthouse magazine from 1988 to 1992. In 1994, he co-created a live musical series called "In Their Own Words: A Bunch Of Songwriters Sittin' Around Singing at The Bottom Line in New York City". The Bottom Line series yielded a number of live compilations on CD and albums of one-off pairings that occurred, such as Lou Reed with Kris Kristofferson, and Roger McGuinn with Pete Seeger.

From 1994 to 1996, Scelsa also selected music and wrote the liner notes for Grooves, a 14-volume budget series of compilations from Time Life Music featuring adult alternative artists. Most of the Grooves CDs featured an exclusive track of a live performance from "Idiots Delight".

Scelsa has appeared on stage numerous times, notably as Vladimir in the Luna Stage production of Waiting for Godot.
