= Pete Fornatale =

American DJ (1945–2012)

- Born: Peter Salvatore Fornatale; August 23, 1945; Bronx, New York, US
- Died: April 26, 2012 (aged 66); Manhattan, New York, US
- Education: Fordham University
- Awards: Armstrong Excellence in Broadcasting Award (1983)
- Presenting career
- Stations: WFUV; WNEW-FM; WXRK-FM; WNET
- Country: United States

Peter Salvatore Fornatale (August 23, 1945 – April 26, 2012) was a New York City disc jockey and author of numerous books on rock and roll. He is considered a "pioneer of FM rock", who played an important role in the progressive rock era of FM broadcasting. He was the first person to host a rock music show on New York City's FM band, commencing November 21, 1964, on WFUV. By broadcasting progressive rock and long album tracks, he was noted for introducing a musical alternative to Top 40 AM radio in New York in the late 1960s and early 1970s. Billboard called his station "a legend, affecting and inspiring people throughout the industry".

He gave early exposure to country-rock bands like Buffalo Springfield and Poco, and did one of the first American interviews with Elton John. In 1991 he was co-host of "Paul Simon Live in Central Park" and was often called to be an expert guest commentator on PBS specials, including those featuring Bob Dylan, John Fogerty, The Grateful Dead, Jimi Hendrix, Roy Orbison, Peter, Paul and Mary, Simon & Garfunkel, James Taylor and others.

== Biography ==
The FCC issued an edict in 1966 requiring FM stations in cities of more than 100,000 people to have independent programming from the associated AM station at least 50% of the time. This led to the first commercial rock station on FM radio, WOR-FM, which premiered July 30, 1966 and presented rock music in a more adult format then generally heard on AM Top-40 formatted radio stations. Fornatale was a key figure in this trend with his weekly program, "Campus Caravan," which was heard on Fordham University's WFUV from 1964 to 1970. He began professionally in 1969 at WNEW-FM and held shifts there until 1989 when he moved to K-Rock: WXRK (née WKTU). He returned to WNEW-FM in January 1997 for the "Classic Rock and Classic Jocks" format and stayed until the Summer of 1998. He returned to WFUV in 2001 and was heard weekly on his shows, "Mixed Bag" and "Mixed Bag Radio," the latter of which was also broadcast on XM Satellite Radio. He won the Armstrong Excellence in Broadcasting Award in 1983. Fornatale received AFTRA's Media & Entertainment Excellence Award in February 2012 at the Plaza Hotel in New York City.

He was a native of the Belmont section of the Bronx and attended Fordham Preparatory School and Fordham University, where he received a B.A. in Communication Arts in 1967. He was a member of the board of World Hunger Year.

In the Fall of 1977, Fornatale hosted the syndicated "Crawdaddy Rock Review" featuring interviews with Brian Wilson, Andy Gibb, Phoebe Snow, Karla Bonoff, George Benson, Johnny Winter, Melissa Manchester, Todd Rundgren, David Brenner and others.

Fornatale wrote several books, including The Rock Music Source Book, Radio in the Television Age, The Story of Rock 'n' Roll, and All You Need Is Love. He was also helped write The Elvis Collection trading card series. In addition, he has written many feature shows for radio and television about Rock, including the syndicated Rock Calendar, episodes of MTV's "Rock Influences," and the international television series Deja View. His latest book is Back to the Garden: The Story of Woodstock.

He hosted rock-related programs on WNET, PBS's station in New York City, and was an on-air consultant for rock music shows and specials on VH1, MTV and HBO.

In June 2010, Fornatale joined the Voice of Peace Network with his show "Back To The Garden" in support of WhyHunger.org. His show featured Pete reflecting on some of his favorite friends and musicians.

In the summer of 2011, Fornatale toured the Northeast with two different multimedia programs to support his most recent book releases. The show titled "Back to the Garden: The Story of Woodstock" focused on Fornatale's experiences as an on-air personality during that period, and it is highlighted by Woodstock-related anecdotes based on events that occurred throughout the DJ's lengthy career as an interviewer, DJ and author. The program titled "How Terribly Strange to be 70" looked at the tumultuous history of Simon & Garfunkel, beginning with their early years when they performed as the duo 'Tom and Jerry'. He was working on a book on the Rolling Stones at the time of his death.

Fornatale died at Beth Israel Medical Center in New York City at age 66 on April 26, 2012. He had suffered a brain hemorrhage April 15, 2012, and had been in the hospital's ICU.

His legacy show "Mixed Bag" on WFUV is still on the air on Saturday afternoons and is currently hosted by Don McGee.

== Bibliography ==
- The Story of Rock 'n Roll (William Morrow & Co, 1987) ISBN 0-688-06277-6
- All You Need Is Love: And 99 Other Life Lessons from Classic Rock Songs (Topeka Bindery, 2003) ISBN 0-613-65637-7
- Simon & Garfunkel's Bookends (Rock of Ages) (Rodale Books, 2007) ISBN 1-59486-427-6
- Back to the Garden: The Story of Woodstock (Simon & Schuster, 2009) ISBN 978-1-4165-9119-1

As co-author:

- with Joshua E. Mills: Radio in the Television Age (Overlook, 1980) ISBN 0-879-51106-0
