= Jonathan Vigliotti =

American journalist

- Born: March 20, 1983 (age 43); Mount Kisco, New York, U.S.
- Education: Fordham University
- Occupation: Reporter
- Spouse: Iván Carrillo (m. 2017)
- Writing career
- Subject: Environmental
- Notable work: Before It's Gone

Jonathan Vigliotti (born March 20, 1983) is an American reporter with CBS News since May 2015. He has been a national correspondent based in Los Angeles since March 2019 and was a London-based foreign correspondent from 2015 to 2019. His reports can be seen regularly on the network's news programs, and affiliate service Newspath. Previously he worked for WNBC in New York City and contributed to The New York Times.

== Early life and education ==
Born in Mount Kisco, New York, Vigliotti grew up in Westchester County. He graduated from Fordham University in 2005 with a Bachelor of Science degree in communications.

== Career ==
While a student, Vigliotti reported and anchored news updates for NPR affiliate WFUV and interned at ABC's 20/20. Before joining CBS News, he reported and anchored at KJCT-TV (ABC) in Grand Junction, Colorado, WTMJ (NBC) in Milwaukee, Wisconsin, and WNBC in New York City. He has also contributed reports for Current TV, The New York Times' Travel Section, and the Pulitzer Center on Crisis Reporting.

During his career he has covered a wide range of stories including the earthquake in Haiti, Hurricane Sandy, the Newtown school shooting, Boston Marathon bombing, ongoing search for MH370 and the Paris terrorist attack.

Vigliotti's tough questioning of Maui county officials following the deadly Lahaina fire launched a state investigation into the island's emergency response. Herman Andaya, the head of the Maui Emergency Response Agency, resigned less than 24 hours after telling Vigliotti he did not regret his decision to not sound emergency sirens. Vigliotti's reporting led to new emergency protocols and statewide reform of Hawaii's disaster response.

== Awards and honors ==
He has received one national Emmy Award and six regional Emmy awards, including "Best On-Camera Talent" for his 2011 investigation into the online gun trade and "Breaking News" for his field reporting during Hurricane Sandy in 2013. He received two Edward R. Murrow awards.

== Personal life ==
Vigliotti married Iván Carrillo in 2017.
