= Rita Houston =

American radio broadcaster (1961–2020)

- Born: September 28, 1961; White Plains, New York, U.S.
- Died: December 15, 2020 (aged 59); Valley Cottage, New York, U.S.
- Partner: Laura Fedele
- Presenting career
- Show: The Whole Wide World
- Station: WFUV
- Country: United States

Rita Houston (September 28, 1961 – December 15, 2020) was the program director of Fordham University's public radio station WFUV and the host of the show The Whole Wide World.

Houston was considered a "tastemaker" in the radio world, helping guide WFUV's musical direction for decades. She was instrumental in the Required Listening series of shows showcasing new and lesser-well-known artists at The Bottom Line club in Greenwich Village; she also interviewed songwriters for the club’s In Their Own Words series. She anchored National Public Radio's coverage of the Newport Folk Festival for several years and helped NPR with their best-of-the-year lists, as well as sometimes appearing on Morning Edition.

Houston came to WFUV in 1994 from WXPS, where she had worked since the late 1980s, hosting the program Starlight Express. She was known for showcasing new talent, such as David Gray. She began as a DJ in the midday slot, and launched her own Friday night program, The Whole Wide World, in 2001. On this show she continued to showcase new talent including Joan Osborne, Adele and Brandi Carlile, who stated "Rita was the very first person to play my music on the radio". Houston became program director in 2014.

Houston died of cancer in December 2020, having stepped down from her role at WFUV earlier in the month. In March 2021, she was honored during the 63rd Annual Grammy Awards in memoriam segment.
