= Chris Booker =

American radio and TV personality

- Born: April 17, 1971 (age 55); New Martinsville, West Virginia U.S.
- Education: West Liberty University
- Occupations: Radio talk show host, TV personality

Chris Booker is an American radio and TV personality.

== Career ==
Born and raised in West Virginia, Booker graduated from Magnolia High School in New Martinsville, WV in 1989.

Booker got his big start in radio in 1989 while attending West Liberty University in Wheeling, West Virginia after a submitting an audition tape through "a friend of a friend" at WOMP-FM. In 1992, he began his self-described "gypsy years radio tour", where he held the positions of on-air personality and music director at a number of different stations as both Chris Booker and Booker Madison in Myrtle Beach, South Carolina, Florence, Kansas City, and Pittsburgh.

In 1996, he landed the evening slot at 92.3 K-Rock in New York City, where he met the nation's top radio talk show host, Howard Stern, who made the young DJ a regular on his program. He made numerous appearances on Howard Stern's show under the name "Booger". Booker left K-Rock in 2003 for the morning drive show on the "Blink" version of WNEW. When that format failed and the show was taken off the air, Booker then worked at Sirius Satellite Radio as morning host for Octane Radio. Booker was then hired at New York Top forty (WHTZ) "Z100" as a fill-in host. Booker eventually found his way back to K-Rock in 2005, where his show aired in the afternoon until the format was changed to "Free FM" talk. His producer and on-air collaborator at the time was Al Dukes.

On January 3, 2006, Booker's "new" radio show (carrying over many of the same elements and players as his afternoon drive rock show) titled The Booker Show debuted from 7 p.m. to 11 p.m. The show aired on Monday–Thursday, and 7–10 p.m. on Fridays at WFNY-FM (92.3 Free-FM).

On May 23, 2008, Booker was fired as the morning show host on "Q102" in Philly (but was still considered an employee of "Q102", due to contractual reasons).

Booker has worked as a correspondent for TV Guide Channel covering red carpet events/ From 2000 to 2003, Booker was a full-time VJ for MTV and MTV2, hosting such shows as The Return of the Rock, First Listen with Britney Spears, and was the final host for the now defunct series 120 Minutes. From 2003 to 2004, Booker was the New York correspondent for Entertainment Tonight.

Booker returned to K-Rock 92.3 FM in NY for the afternoon drive (2–7 pm) on January 7, 2009. However, he was again removed from K-Rock 92.3 FM when it flipped to 92.3 NOW on March 11, 2009, at 5 pm.

On June 1, 2009, Booker began hosting afternoons at "97.1 AMP" KAMP in Los Angeles. In October 2019, he moved to mornings, co-hosting with Chelsea Briggs and Krystal Bee. Booker was let go on April 2, 2020.

As February 1, 2022, Booker is now a co-host of the Booker & Stryker afternoon show with Stryker at KYSR in Los Angeles.

== The Q102 Booker Show ==
Booker's first show on Q102 Philly aired on Wednesday, May 10, 2006, at 6:00 am. On his first show, Booker had a conversation/interview with Howard Stern (who was also live on the air on Sirius at the time).

In July 2007, Booker officially announced that Angi Taylor, who had been a co-host for previous Q102 morning shows, would return to Q102 and become a new co-host on The Booker Show.

On May 23, 2008, Booker was fired as the morning show host on Q102 in Philadelphia. Booker responded that he was "surprised. Very, very surprised. It's a very successful show. I've been fired before for low ratings, but never while being No. 1." The station decided to move to a show that's more music-intensive. However, on July 23, 2008, Q102 began to broadcast The Elvis Duran Morning Show. His co-host, Angi Taylor was also fired and so was his producer, Blaire Galaton. His sidekick Diego Ramos, was later released.

== Podcast ==
Since July 2015, Chris Booker and Perez Hilton have hosted a weekly podcast named The Perez Hilton Podcast with Chris Booker (PHP). According to the Billboard, the two met on the Amp Radio where Booker hosted "Morning Show on L.A. Top 40" and also appeared on "Carson Daly's Show". The podcast covers trending stories in the world of show business, interviews with celebrities and interesting personalities, and more. In April 2019, Booker and Hilton hosted their live show at The Space in Las Vegas.
