= Meg Griffin (DJ) =

American radio disc jockey (born 1953)

Meg Griffin (born December 2, 1953) is an American radio disc jockey, currently heard on the Sirius XM Satellite Radio channels The Loft, Classic Vinyl, and The Beatles Channel. She retired from the Deep Tracks station on Sunday, November 12, 2023.

Primarily known for classic and modern rock music genres, Griffin began her disc jockey career in 1975 alongside Howard Stern at WRNW in Briarcliff Manor, New York. Griffin later had stints at K-Rock (WXRK), WNEW-FM and WBAI in New York City, WLIR on Long Island, and WMMR (1978 and 1980) in Philadelphia, Pennsylvania. Her on-air nickname is "Megless."

She was originally going to be a VJ on MTV when it launched on August 1, 1981. However, she decided against it at the last minute. She was reluctant to leave her job at WNEW, she believed the salary was insufficient, and she was offended by a comment she overheard Bob Pittman make: "I have my Black, my Jew, my WASP, my sex-bomb, and now my tomboy." Rather than formally decline the offer, she didn't show up for her first day of work. A producer called her home, and Griffin's husband informed them she was no longer interested. Martha Quinn took her place.

Prior to the Sirius/XM merger in 2008, Griffin appeared on the Sirius channels Sirius Disorder and Folk Town. She also appeared on University of Massachusetts Boston station WUMB-FM in 2010–11.

She was featured in a 2015 documentary about Radio DJs called I Am What I Play, directed by Roger King.

In June 2025, Sirius XM celebrated her 25 years on the platform with an on-air special titled "25 Years of Meg Griffin". It featured tributes from various artists throughout her career, and more.
