= Dennis Elsas =

American disc jockey in New York City

- Born: Queens, New York City, U.S.
- Education: Queens College
- Career
- Stations: SiriusXM; WFUV; WNEW-FM
- Country: United States
- Website: www.denniselsas.com

Dennis Elsas is an American disc jockey and voiceover artist whose career has spanned more than 50 years. He currently hosts a weekday afternoon program on WFUV and several music programs on SiriusXM.

== Early life and education ==
Raised in Jackson Heights, Queens, Elsas attended Queens College of the City University of New York, graduating in 1968. During his time at Queens College, he was active as a disc jockey and program director and in 1966 helped establish WQMC, the campus radio station.

At the same time, the rock radio landscape was changing and some FM radio stations experimented with a more alternative approach to presenting the music in sharp contrast to the tightly formatted AM radio Top 40 stations of the time. Progressive album-oriented rock emerged as a format that gave album rock a larger platform and the DJs more freedom and influence over what music listeners heard. In 1969, Elsas joined WVOX, a suburban FM radio station in New Rochelle, New York, creating "Something Else Again," a weekly program that showcased his unique approach to presenting music within the progressive rock format.

== Radio ==
Over a radio career spanning more than half a century in New York, Dennis Elsas has worked as a disc jockey and interviewer across multiple formats and stations. His work has been featured in an exhibit at the Rock & Roll Hall of Fame and Museum highlighting America’s most influential disc jockeys. Elsas is long recognized for his mastery of “the art of the segue,” a creative hallmark that has defined his on-air style.

=== WNEW-FM ===
Dennis Elsas joined New York City’s WNEW-FM (102.7) in July 1971, after submitting a demo tape in April 1971 to the station’s program director, Scott Muni. Initially taking on overnight and other coverage shifts, Elsas became a regular member of the station’s on-air staff by 1972.

Within months of joining WNEW-FM, Elsas expanded beyond overnight work into regular fill-in daytime and weekend shifts. From 1976 to 1982, he held the station’s weekday 6:00–10:00 p.m. time slot, regarded at the time as a prime-time position in FM radio. Over the course of the 1980s and 1990s, he hosted a wide range of programs at the station, including mid-day, evening, and weekend shifts.

In early 1972, Elsas was appointed music director at WNEW-FM. His responsibilities included selecting and programming new music, coordinating with record labels, and shaping the station’s evolving sound. During this period, WNEW-FM became known for premiering new recordings and introducing emerging artists, allowing extended on-air conversations with musicians. The station developed a reputation as a cultural hub for contemporary rock music and adopted the slogan “Where Rock Lives.”

During Elsas’s tenure, WNEW-FM developed a reputation as a venue where major recording artists regularly appeared in person for extended, on-air interviews. Many of these interviews took place live in the station’s midtown Manhattan studios and often extended beyond standard promotional segments. While at the station, Elsas conducted interviews with leading figures in rock music, including Paul McCartney, Mick Jagger, Pete Townshend, Elton John, Joni Mitchell, and Paul Simon.

One of the most notable broadcasts in the station’s history occurred on September 28, 1974, when John Lennon appeared live on WNEW-FM for a two-hour on-air conversation with Elsas. Originally scheduled to promote Walls and Bridges, the appearance expanded into a wide-ranging discussion of Lennon’s career and his time with The Beatles. During the broadcast, Lennon also served as a guest disc jockey, playing records he had brought with him, reading station identifications, delivering live commercials, and offering a weather report. The broadcast has since been cited as a notable moment in WNEW-FM’s programming history.

Throughout the 1980s and 1990s, Elsas remained a consistent on-air presence at WNEW-FM as the station navigated changes in ownership, management, and its programming direction. Elsas departed the station in 1998, as WNEW-FM entered a period of transition that ultimately ended its long-standing rock format, concluding a career at the station that spanned more than twenty-five years.

=== WFUV ===
Elsas joined WFUV (90.7 FM) in the summer of 2000 and hosts the station’s weekday afternoon program from 2 to 6 PM. His show presents a wide mix of rock, folk, jazz, and blues, reflecting the progressive radio tradition associated with the station. He also hosts the weekly segment Beatles Fab Foursome, which airs on Friday afternoons.

WFUV has produced two specials highlighting his career. A four-hour program marking his 50 years in New York radio featured interview highlights, archival material, and tributes from artists. A separate retrospective celebrated his 25 years at WFUV and documented his work at the station since 2000.

=== SiriusXM ===
Elsas joined Sirius (now SiriusXM) in 2004, establishing a long-running presence on both Classic Vinyl and The Beatles Channel.

On Classic Vinyl, he appears Saturday nights for a six-hour program that blends classic rock tracks, deep album cuts, artist commentary, historical context, and behind-the-music stories drawn from his decades in New York radio.

On The Beatles Channel, Elsas co-hosts the weekly live call-in roundtable The Fab Fourum, which features celebrity interviews, listener calls, and discussions about the band. He also hosts Across the Universe: The Life and Music of John Lennon, a weekly show dedicated to Lennon’s life and music.

=== Interviews ===
Elsas is known for his extensive interviews with leading figures in rock and roll. Music producer and artist Peter Asher said of him, “Sitting down for an interview with Dennis Elsas, one can expect intelligent and perceptive questions and an original perspective.”

Over the course of his career, Elsas has conducted more than 150 interviews spanning multiple decades, formats, and platforms. His archive includes conversations with artists, songwriters, and cultural figures whose work shaped the modern rock era.

Elsas’ September 28, 1974 interview with John Lennon is widely regarded as one of the most significant radio interviews in rock history and among the finest ever conducted with him. The broadcast has been cited and excerpted extensively in books, documentaries, and archival collections, including the Paley Center for Media. Excerpts from the interview have appeared in major documentaries, including The Beatles Anthology, LennoNYC, and The Beatles: Eight Days a Week – The Touring Years. The interview is also featured on John Lennon’s official website.

Originally scheduled as a promotional appearance for Lennon’s then-new album Walls and Bridges, the broadcast evolved into a two-hour conversation covering a wide range of subjects. Lennon discussed rare Beatles anecdotes, addressed his United States immigration issues, and spoke about his affection for New York City.

Among the artists he highlighted was Electric Light Orchestra, whom he praised while discussing contemporary music influences. Additional topics included Lennon’s early relationship with the Rolling Stones in London and broader reflections on creativity after the Beatles’ breakup. Lennon acknowledged that future collaboration among the former band members was possible but expressed little interest in returning to large-scale touring.

Elsas continued his interview work across multiple platforms, including WFUV, where he interviewed Graham Nash, Ringo Starr, David Crosby, Elvis Costello, Patti Smith, and Julian Lennon.

He also interviewed Roger Daltrey on both WFUV and PM Magazine, and conducted PM Magazine interviews with Jerry Garcia, Little Richard, and Carly Simon.

== Voiceover ==
Elsas has built an extensive voiceover career across major television networks and national brands, including HBO, Cinemax, Showtime, The Movie Channel, American Express, Time, Lancôme, Procter & Gamble, and Kraft Foods. He has also narrated museum audio tours for cultural and historical exhibitions.

Elsas worked on syndicated programs including Rock Today, Rock ’n’ Roll Never Forgets, Billboard Entertainment News, and assorted Westwood One specials. He was the announcer for the Rock and Roll Hall of Fame Induction Ceremony and for VH1’s Concert of the Century at the White House. He was the narrator of Discovery Magazine on the Discovery Network and served as the voice of the Smithsonian Channel.

== Other Projects ==
Alongside his radio career, Elsas has been involved in a range of related projects, including nationally syndicated radio and television programs and a number of live events. He has interviewed major artists, hosted special programs, and taken part in panels, Q&A sessions, and retrospective discussions.

From 1979 to 1981, Elsas served as the announcer for the nationally syndicated Robert Klein Radio Show.

In 1984–1985, Elsas served as the rock correspondent for the nationally syndicated television program PM Magazine, interviewing artists such as Little Richard, Jerry Garcia, and Roger Daltrey.

His additional syndicated radio features in the 1980s included Rock Today, Billboard Entertainment News, and assorted Westwood One specials.

In September 2018, Elsas served as master of ceremonies at the United States Postal Service first-day-of-issue ceremony in New York City for the John Lennon Commemorative Forever stamp, appearing with Yoko Ono and Sean Lennon.

=== It Was Forty Years Ago Today: The Beatles Invade America ===
Inspired by his 1974 interview with John Lennon and a lifelong passion for the Beatles, Elsas produced, co-wrote, and hosted It Was Forty Years Ago Today: The Beatles Invade America, a radio documentary commemorating the 40th anniversary of the Beatles’ first visit to the United States. The program originally aired on WFUV in 2004 and received several major honors, including the New York State Broadcasters Association’s award for Best Documentary and a New York Festivals World Medal. A revised version aired in 2014 to commemorate the 50th anniversary and was included in the Grammy Museum’s traveling exhibition Ladies and Gentlemen...The Beatles! In 2024, It Was 60 Years Ago Today: The Beatles Invade America was updated and re-aired on WFUV to mark the 60th anniversary of the Beatles’ arrival in the United States. The broadcast revisited how New York radio covered the band’s 1964 landing at Kennedy Airport and competed to be the source for all things Beatles.

=== Bethel Woods ===
Elsas served as a consultant during the creation of the Museum at Bethel Woods, the cultural center built on the site of the 1969 Woodstock festival. He later became featured in the museum as the “Voice of Rock History,” contributing archival audio and context to its exhibits. In May 2008, at the opening of the Museum at Bethel Woods, Elsas interviewed Richie Havens and John Sebastian on stage about their Woodstock experience.

=== Rock 'n' Roll Never Forgets ===
In 2010, Elsas created Rock ‘n' Roll Never Forgets, a live multimedia event that showcases his historic radio interviews with music legends such as Elton John, Jerry Garcia, Pete Townshend, and John Lennon along with his personal memories and behind-the-scenes stories, starting with the Top 40 radio that he grew up with, the progressive evolution of WNEW-FM, and his current work on WFUV and SiriusXM.

In March 2026, Elsas presented Rock ’n’ Roll Never Forgets to a sold-out audience at the Sheen Center for Thought and Culture in Greenwich Village, New York City, as a benefit for WFUV.

=== Fordham University ===
In 2011 Elsas created and taught a Fordham University course, "The Rock Revolution in Music and Media" on both the graduate (2011) and undergraduate level (2016). The course is still part of the Fordham curriculum.
