= William (Rosko) Mercer =

William Roscoe Mercer (May 25, 1927 – August 1, 2000), also known as Rosko, was an American announcer, commercial voice over specialist and disc jockey (DJ). He is best known for his stints on New York's WOR-FM and WNEW-FM in the late 1960s and 1970s. He was often a rare African-American voice on radio stations that primarily broadcast to white audiences.

His first job for a large media market radio station came in 1965, when he was a DJ on KBLA 1500 AM in Burbank, California. Later, Rosko and other DJs of the time pioneered the Progressive Rock format on FM stations, in response to the restrictive playlist programming of Top 40 AM stations.

Mercer provided voiceovers for several films that Jim Henson created during the early days of Sesame Street, including Nobody, known for appearing on the segment "Count to Ten with Nobody".

== Career ==
Rosco provided the sleeve notes for Life, the Sly & the Family Stone album released in 1968. In 1968 he also read portions of Khalil Gibran's work, along with accompaniment by John Berberian, on Music And Gibran (A Contemporary Interpretation) (Verve Records).

In the early 1980s, he joined 92.3 WKTU in New York during its disco music era for an evening program. He started and ended each show with the greeting "This is Rosko. I sure do love you so."

Mercer died of cancer on August 1, 2000.

=== Recordings ===
Rosko provided the voice narration on three Bob Thiele albums for Flying Dutchman Records albums. The Albums each documented a perspective on major incidents that occurred in the late 1960s and early 1970s. They include "Robert Scheer's A Night At Santa Rita" from 1969; "Pete Hamill's My Lai massacre" also from 1969; and "Pete Hamills Murder at Kent State University in 1970.
