= WAXQ =

Classic rock radio station in New York City

- New York, New York; United States
- Broadcast area: New York metropolitan area
- Frequency: 104.3 MHz (HD Radio)
- Branding: Q104.3

Programming
- Language: English
- Format: Classic rock
- Subchannels: HD2: TikTok radio
- Affiliations: iHeartRadio; Premiere Networks; New York Jets

Ownership
- Owner: iHeartMedia; (iHM Licenses, LLC)
- Sister stations: WHTZ; WKTU; WLTW; WOR; WWPR-FM; WWRL

History
- First air date: December 1, 1956
- Former call signs: WFMX (1956–1957); WNCN (1957–1974); WQIV (1974–1975); WNCN (1975–1993)
- Call sign meaning: Wax is slang for a vinyl record, owing to a prior AOR format

Technical information
- Licensing authority: FCC
- Facility ID: 23004
- Class: B
- ERP: 6,000 watts (analog); 239 watts (digital)
- HAAT: 415 meters (1,362 ft)
- Transmitter coordinates: 40.748417°N 73.985694°W

Links
- Public license information: Public file; LMS
- Webcast: Listen live (via iHeartRadio)
- Website: q1043.iheart.com

WAXQ (104.3 MHz) is a commercial FM radio station licensed to serve New York, New York, it airs a classic rock radio format and is owned by iHeartMedia, Inc. WAXQ's studios are at 125 West 55th Street in Midtown Manhattan. DJs heard on WAXQ include radio veterans Carol Miller and Jim Kerr. The station's transmitter is located at the Empire State Building.

== History ==
=== WFDR (1949–1952) ===
A station signed on the air on the 104.3 frequency in 1949. Its call sign was WFDR, a non-profit FM station owned by the International Ladies' Garment Workers' Union. The call letters referred to the late President Franklin D. Roosevelt, a hero to the labor movement.

However, few people owned FM receivers in that era. Like many early FM stations, WFDR lost money, and the station ceased operations in 1952.

=== WNCN (1956–1974) ===
A new FM station began broadcasting on the 104.3 frequency on December 1, 1956. Its call sign was WFMX. Within a year, it adopted the call letters WNCN, standing for "New York Concert Network." It was a part of a group of classical music stations in the Northeastern United States. The Concert Network was programmed from WBCN in Boston and was carried by affiliates WXCN in Providence, Rhode Island (now WWBB) and WHCN in Hartford, Connecticut, as well as WNCN.

Later, WNCN was acquired by medical advertising agency owner Ludwig Wolfgang Frohlich, the founder of the National Science Network. The station added daily medical news reports to its schedule, since it was believed that classical music was the choice of doctors and dentists. WNCN's tower was moved from the Hotel Pierre to the Empire State Building, increasing the station's coverage.

=== WQIV (1974–1975) ===
National Science sold the station to Starr Broadcast Group in 1974. The station retained its classical music format for many years, except for a short period during 1974–1975 when it took up a progressive rock format with the call letters WQIV.

During the brief run of WQIV, the station's progressive rock appealed to long-time WNEW-FM listeners. Some veteran 1970s FM rock DJs were heard on WQIV, including Rosko (William Mercer) and Carol Miller. This brief period also saw deployment of a short-lived technology as unintentionally brief as the format change itself: WQIV broadcast in quadraphonic sound (a precursor to "Surround Sound") as indicated by the new call letters "Q" (quadraphonic) "IV" (Roman numeral 4). The choice of these call letters was a reminder to audiences of this technical innovation, although history shows that the consumer audio marketplace quickly abandoned quad.

The WQIV era was during ownership by Starr Broadcast Group, of which political commentator and author William F. Buckley Jr. was chairman. The GM was Alan Eisenberg, and the program director was Larry Miller (later with WKTU). The announcement that the station was changing to rock music was read by Buckley himself and repeated frequently on the air. Two groups, the WNCN Listeners Guild and Classical Radio for Connecticut, were formed, and petitioned the FCC to block the flip.

A last minute stay by a U.S. Supreme Court Justice delayed the scheduled changeover, but that was lifted and WNCN became WQIV. The first selection played on the air by Larry Miller after WQIV debuted was the Electric Light Orchestra's "Roll Over Beethoven". William Buckley admitted he loved classical music, but had a responsibility to Starr shareholders to maximize returns. The Listeners Guild continued its fight, and eventually forced a change back to classical music when an application was filed for the frequency by a new group headed by William Benton of the Encyclopædia Britannica.

=== Return to WNCN (1975–1993) ===
Starr relented, and in a negotiated settlement, sold the station to GAF Broadcasting. WQIV signed off with "Funeral for a Friend" by Elton John. The station then played the last 2 notes of the last classical song on the original WNCN that were cut off, then said "sorry for the interruption".

The first selection played on the air after the change back was from Johann Sebastian Bach's Mass in B-minor, "Et resurrexit". From 1971 to 1974 and again from 1975 to 1994, David Dubal served as music director of WNCN.

The station was owned by GAF Broadcasting until 1996, when Viacom purchased it for $100 million. For much of this time, New York had three FM stations playing classical music: WNCN, WQXR-FM (owned by The New York Times) and WNYC-FM (owned by the City of New York). Over time, the classical format became harder to sell to advertisers. By the end of 1993, with WNCN and WQXR (then a commercial station) facing considerable listener overlap and a relatively small audience, GAF decided to make a change.

=== WAXQ (1993–present) ===
On December 18, 1993, at midnight, WNCN signed off for good. The last selection was Joseph Haydn's Symphony No. 45 (also known as the "Farewell Symphony"). A farewell message came from station president and general manager Randy Bongarten. After stunting with a nearly 12-minute loop of a ticking clock and construction sound effects, the station debuted a new, current-based, hard-edged album-oriented rock (AOR) format, along with new call letters WAXQ and the branding "Q104.3". The station launched with an "AC/DC A-to-Z" playlist; accordingly, the first song under the new format was the group's "Ain't No Fun (Waiting Round To Be A Millionaire)".

The first on-air staff was Trent Tyler and Christine Nagy in morning drive time, Heidi Hess in middays, Ida Hakkila and Mark Razz in afternoon drive, Candy Martin (Candice Agree) in nights and Lark Logan in overnights. The station's first PD was Bob Elliot, who was replaced by Ron Valeri. Split into five-song blocks that focused on current hard rock favorites, also mixed in were classic rock tunes and cuts from bands not typically thought of as radio friendly (such as Type O Negative and Anthrax).

At first, the ratings were low, as this format was not ideal during a time in which more people were listening to alternative rock than to mainstream hard rock or heavy metal. Also, during the mid-1990s, other New York City radio stations were playing alternative rock music, as WXRK went from classic rock to alternative and WNEW-FM was trying to go after a younger audience by adding alternative titles.

In 1996, thanks to a deal involving a swapping of various broadcast stations, Viacom acquired WAXQ. After initial consideration was given for the station to turn to a country music format, management decided that there was a need for a full-time classic rock station in New York City. As a result, the station switched to classic rock at 5 a.m. on July 1, 1996. Research indicated that if WNEW-FM were to revert to an all-classic rock format, listeners would not return there due to the distrust for that station. As it turned out, WNEW-FM did unsuccessfully return to a classic rock format in January 1997, six months after WAXQ's flip.

That same year, Viacom sold off its entire radio division before its merger with CBS and Infinity. The new owner was Chancellor Media. Chancellor, in turn, merged with Capstar Broadcasting to form AMFM in August 1998. In 2000, AMFM was purchased by Clear Channel Communications, forerunner of today's iHeartMedia.

The Sopranos often featured WAXQ as the radio station Tony Soprano would set on his alarm clock. In contrast to their respective tenures on other New York area radio stations, the DJs on Q104.3 now have little creative input into what music gets played, as is common nowadays at most major market radio stations. The playlist is narrower than that of classic rock radio stations of the past, due to results from audience research. Older songs that were once staples of classic rock radio, such as "Eight Miles High" by the Byrds, are now only played during infrequent segments devoted to "Deep Classics". In an effort to appeal to younger rock fans, some rock acts from the 1990s, such as the Red Hot Chili Peppers and Stone Temple Pilots are included. WAXQ plays some pop-leaning classics from artists such as Elton John, Billy Joel and Phil Collins, that are not found on harder-edged classic rock stations.

On February 28, 2024, iHeartMedia announced that it had signed a deal for WAXQ to be the new radio and local streaming home of the New York Jets. The Jets became the 19th of the 32 NFL teams to sign a deal with the broadcaster. The move was triggered by the impending end of a local marketing agreement (LMA) by the operators of previous broadcaster WEPN-FM. That agreement was set to end at the end of August of that year, just before the team's season would begin.

In 2026, WAXQ stopped referring to itself on air as a classic rock station, adopting the slogan "New York's Rock." This came after the station, along with many iHeartMedia-owned classic rock stations, began adding more 90s and 2000s rock tracks into their playlist and removing the word "Classic" on their repositioning, effectively shifting to a mainstream rock-like format.

== HD operations ==
Like other Clear Channel stations, WAXQ adopted HD Radio technology in late winter 2006. That gave it the ability to add digital subchannels with different programming for listeners whose radios are equipped to receive HD broadcasts. On WAXQ-HD1, the classic rock format could be heard on the original analog station. WAXQ-HD2 played a blend of deep classic rock cuts including some hard rock and current releases by classic rock artists.

With the demise of "K-Rock" on 92.3 WXRK in early 2009, WAXQ's HD2 subchannel began airing "Rock Nation" to satisfy the fans of K-Rock's active rock format. On July 16, 2011, one day after alternative station 101.9 RXP flipped formats, the HD2 channel became "The Alternative Project" to somewhat fill the gap of alternative rock. As of August 2011, the HD2 channel played a mix of mostly active rock, mixed with 90's alternative hard rock. Although the station's legal ID at the top of the hour stated "The Alternative Project", it was neither airing "Rock Nation" nor "The Alternative Project". Two weeks later in mid-August 2011, "The Alternative Project" feed returned. On October 1, 2015, HD2 became "iHeartCountry" with a country music format. However, sometime in 2017, the HD2 country format was replaced by a simulcast of sister station WOR 710 AM, which has a talk radio format.

"The Alternative Project" would later return in 2018, but this time on the new HD3 subchannel, despite having competition from rival alternative station 92.3 WNYL. The HD3 subchannel has since been discontinued.
