= FMQB =

Trade magazine

Friday Morning Quarterback (FMQB)
- FMQB Magazine logo
- Editor: Kal Rudman
- Categories: Radio industry
- Frequency: Monthly
- Circulation: 10,000
- First issue: 1968
- Country: United States
- Based in: Cherry Hill, New Jersey
- Language: English
- Website: fmqb.com
- OCLC: 857904873

Friday Morning Quarterback (better known as FMQB) was a trade magazine which covered the radio and music industries in the United States. Its coverage included programming, management, promotion, marketing, and airplay for music formatted radio. The magazine was founded in 1968 by Kal Rudman and was read by thousands of industry professionals. The website also hosted an industry database of over 5,000 music and radio professionals. In 2020, FMQB was sold to music industry veteran Fred Deane and re-branded Deane Media Solutions (DMS).
