= Harry Harrison (DJ) =

American radio personality (1930–2020)

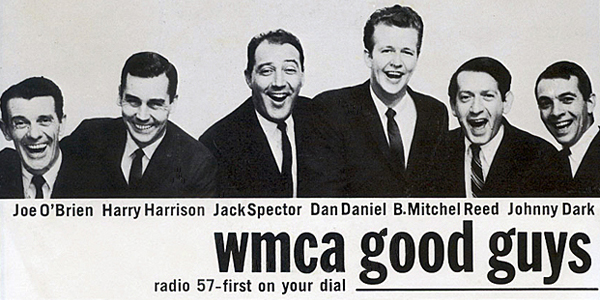
- With the WMCA "Good Guys" (second from left)
- Born: September 20, 1930; Chicago, Illinois, U.S.
- Died: January 28, 2020 (aged 89); Westwood, New Jersey, U.S.
- Other name: "Morning Mayor"
- Occupation: Disc jockey
- Parents: Harry Harrison (father); Mary (McKenna) Harrison (mother)

Harry M. Harrison (September 20, 1930 – January 28, 2020) was an American radio personality, primarily in New York City, for over 50 years. Harrison is the only disc jockey to be a WMCA "Good Guy", a WABC "All-American", and a personality on WCBS-FM's oldies format. Harrison retired in June 2005. He was known as New York's "Morning Mayor" after having hosted morning drive time through most of his career.

== Early ==
Harry M. Harrison was born on September 20, 1930, in Chicago to Harry Harrison and Mary (McKenna) Harrison. He attended a seminary with the intention of becoming a priest. Bedridden with rheumatic fever for nearly a year, he kept his ear glued to the radio, which decided him on a broadcasting career. He began his radio career at WCFL in 1953, later hosting a morning show at WPEO in Peoria, Illinois, before moving to New York City.

== Career ==
=== WCFL, Chicago, Illinois (1953–1954) ===
Harrison worked at WCFL 1000 AM as a summer replacement, yet remained there eight months, substituting for the permanent DJs.

=== WPEO, Peoria, Illinois (1954–1959) ===
Harrison became program director at WPEO, Peoria and hosted the morning show as the "Morning Mayor of Peoria." In just six months, Harrison made WPEO the top station.

=== WMCA, New York (1959–1968) ===
In 1959, Harrison joined WMCA 570 AM, New York, as the midday "Good Guy." (WMCA disc jockeys were dubbed Good Guys.) Joe O'Brien (mornings) and Harrison gave WMCA a "one-two punch" for over eight years. Harrison, along with wife Patti, and children Brian Joseph ["B.J."], Patti, Patrick, and Michael, called the New York suburbs "home".

In 1965, he recorded the holiday narration "May You Always", which was released as a single on Amy Records and made the Billboard Christmas singles chart that year.

Other WMCA "Good Guys" included Jack Spector, B. Mitchel Reed, Dan Daniel and Johnny Dark, and talk show host Barry Gray. Harrison became popular with his "Housewife Hall of Fame" feature, and participated in the 1966 WMCA Good Guy picnic. Often, he scored the highest ratings on WMCA. Program director Rick Sklar of competing Top 40 station WABC took note.

=== WABC–AM, New York (1968–1979) ===
In 1968, when WABC morning host Herb Oscar Anderson left the station, Rick Sklar hired Harrison to be the new morning DJ. Harrison was followed on the WABC schedule by Ron Lundy in middays and Dan Ingram in afternoons.

Every year, Harrison played seasonal songs, such as his holiday greeting "May You Always" in December (the Amy records single of this song made the Billboard Christmas charts in 1965), and Allan Sherman's summer camp novelty, "Hello Muddah, Hello Fadduh", throughout the summer months.

WABC personalities included, along with Harrison; Charlie Greer, Scott Muni, Bob Lewis, Ron Lundy, Johnny Donovan, Dan Ingram, Bruce Morrow aka "Cousin Brucie", Chuck Leonard, Bob Cruz, Frank Kingston Smith, Roby Yonge and Jay Reynolds.

Harrison had a number of "trademark" phrases, such as "Morning, Mom"; "Every brand new day should be unwrapped like a precious gift"; "Stay well, stay happy, stay right here"; and "Harry Harrison wishing you all the very best... because that's exactly what you deserve!" Also, on the last day of every year, Harrison would bring his four children to work with him and at the end of his shift, he would join them in giving listeners New Year's wishes.

Harrison was let go from WABC as the station changed direction in November 1979.

=== WCBS–FM, New York (1980–2003) ===
On March 24, 1980, Harrison became the morning personality at WCBS-FM 101.1, playing oldies music. In 1984, with Lundy joining the station, they were once again heard back-to-back. Harrison would interact with Morning Crew engineer Al Vertucci, sportscaster Phil Pepe, and joke about "wacky weather" and toupee warnings with meteorologist Irv "Mr. "G" Gikofsky, and newscasters Mary Jane Royce and Sue Evans. At 7:20 AM, Harrison opened the "birthday book" and announced listener and celebrity birthdays.

On March 19, 2003, after a 44-year career in New York radio, Harrison left WCBS-FM, saying "I am not retiring." His farewell to his loyal radio friends (from 5:30 to 10:00am) was held before a live audience at the Museum of Television and Radio in New York City. It offered old airchecks plus guest appearances by WCBS-FM colleagues Don K. Reed, Bobby Jay, Steve O'Brien, Randy Davis and Dan Taylor, his replacement, as well as his son and daughter, Patti. Harrison took phone calls from Bob Shannon, Mike Fitzgerald, Ed Baer, and Ron Lundy. Songs included Gladys Knight's "Neither One of Us (Wants to Be the First to Say Goodbye)" and the Little River Band's "Reminiscing," before closing with "That's What Friends Are For."

=== WCBS–FM, New York (2004–2005) ===
Harrison returned to WCBS-FM with a Saturday morning show in 2004. It offered two hours of variety and two hours of Beatles music and memories.

On Memorial Day, May 30, 2005, Harry and "Cousin Brucie" Bruce Morrow were guests on WABC Radio's annual Rewound show. Four days later, on June 3, WCBS-FM ended its "oldies" format, in favor of the new "Jack" format. However, as a result of listener disapproval, the WCBS-FM Oldies format was brought back on July 12, 2007, in a modernized form.

== Legacy ==
- Harrison was known as New York's "Morning Mayor".
- Mayor Rudy Giuliani declared April 25, 1997, as "Harry Harrison Day," in honor of the city's second "mayor."
- In November 2019 Harrison was inducted into the National Radio Hall of Fame. Fellow inductees included John Tesh, Ryan Seacrest, and Dr. Ruth Westheimer.

== Death ==
Harry Harrison died on January 28, 2020, at his home in Westwood, New Jersey, at the age of 89. He is survived by his daughter Patti and son Patrick; his sons Michael and BJ, and wife Patti predeceased him.
