= WABC (AM) =

Clear-channel talk radio station licensed to New York City

- New York, New York; United States
- Broadcast area: New York metropolitan area
- Frequency: 770 kHz
- Branding: Talkradio 77 WABC

Programming
- Language: English
- Format: Conservative talk radio
- Affiliations: Fox News Radio; Red Apple Audio Networks; Salem Radio Network; Westwood One

Ownership
- Owner: Red Apple Media; (Red Apple Media, Inc.)
- Sister stations: WLID; WLIR-FM; WRCR

History
- First air date: October 1, 1921
- Former call signs: WJZ (1921–1953)
- Former frequencies: 833 kHz (1921–1923); 660 kHz (1923–1928); 760 kHz (1928–1941)
- Call sign meaning: formerly owned by the American Broadcasting Company

Technical information
- Licensing authority: FCC
- Facility ID: 70658
- Class: A (Clear channel)
- Power: 50,000 watts
- Transmitter coordinates: 40°52′50.3″N 74°4′9.1″W (main); 40°52′50.6″N 74°4′4.6″W (auxiliary)
- Repeaters: (107.1 MHz) WLIR-FM (Hampton Bays); (1370 kHz) WLID (Patchogue); (1700 kHz) WRCR (Haverstraw)

Links
- Public license information: Public file; LMS
- Webcast: Listen live (via iHeartRadio)
- Website: wabcradio.com

WABC (770 kHz) is a commercial AM radio station licensed to serve New York, New York. The flagship station of John Catsimatidis' Red Apple Media, it airs a conservative talk radio format branded as "Talkradio 77". WABC's studios are located in Red Apple Media headquarters on Third Avenue in Midtown Manhattan and its transmitter is in Lodi, New Jersey. Its 50,000-watt non-directional clear channel signal can be heard at night throughout much of the Eastern United States and Eastern Canada. It is the primary entry point for the Emergency Alert System in the New York metropolitan area and New Jersey. WABC simulcasts on WLIR-FM in Hampton Bays, New York, on eastern Long Island.

Owned and operated by the American Broadcasting Company (ABC) for much of its history, it is one of the country's oldest radio stations. WABC began broadcasting in early October 1921, originally as WJZ in Newark, New Jersey. From 1943 through 2007, the station served as the flagship for the original ABC Radio Network (and its direct predecessor, the Blue Network) and ABC's radio news service. While WABC has been a talk radio station since 1982, the station broadcast a Top 40 music format from 1960 to 1982. Starting in the 1960s to 1978, WABC was not only the dominant contemporary music station in New York City, but was also among the most listened-to radio stations in North America, serving as a template for many other Top 40 stations around the country.

== History ==
=== WJZ Newark (1921–1923) ===
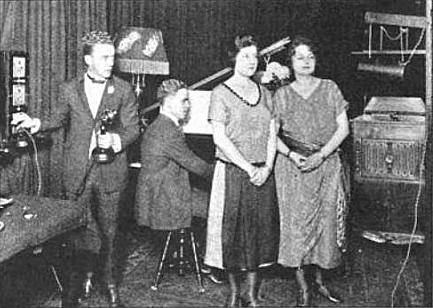
Original WJZ Newark studio. The microphone is the horizontal cylinder located at the upper right.

In November 1920, the Westinghouse Electric & Manufacturing Company had established its first broadcasting station, KDKA, located in its plant at East Pittsburgh, Pennsylvania, to promote the sale of radio receivers. This initial station proved successful, so the next year the company developed plans to set up additional stations in major population centers, including, in addition to the New York City area, WBZ, originally in Springfield, Massachusetts, and KYW, originally in Chicago, Illinois.

On September 30, 1921, Westinghouse was issued a broadcasting authorization for a station with the randomly assigned call letters WJZ, located at the company's meter factory at Orange and Plane streets in Newark, New Jersey, and transmitting on a wavelength of 360 meters (833 kHz).

WJZ's studio and transmitter were initially housed in a shack located on a factory roof that was only accessible by ladder. The station later expanded to a larger studio on the factory's ground floor. The station began test transmissions around October 1, 1921, followed, beginning October 5, by broadcasts of the 1921 World Series baseball games. Announcer Thomas H. Cowan in Newark simply relayed the description phoned in from the Polo Grounds baseball field by Newark Sunday Call sportswriter Sandy Hunt. (At first station announcers were identified only by initials; in Cowan's case as "ACN", for "Announcer-Cowan-Newark".)

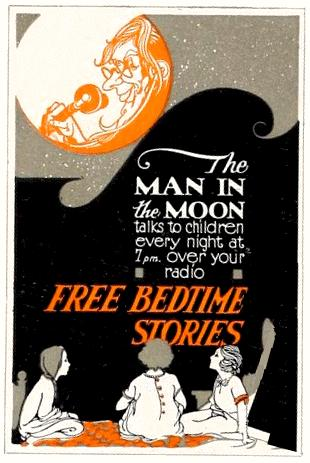
The nightly "Man in the Moon" bedtime stories were a popular early feature.

The station soon expanded to feature a wide variety of live programming. A popular early feature was the "Man in the Moon" bedtime stories, written by Josephine Lawrence and read over the air by Bill McNeary (both were Newark Sunday Call employees). Beginning on November 27, 1921, a weekly 90-minute show presented by the Vincent Lopez band was aired.

When it began its broadcast service, WJZ was the only station in the New York City area transmitting on 360 meters. In mid-December 1921 station WDY, operated by the Radio Corporation of America (RCA) from Roselle Park, New Jersey, began sharing the wavelength, with WJZ now broadcasting on Sundays, Tuesdays, Thursdays, and Saturdays, and WDY operating on the other three nights. This soon ended when WDY ceased operations in mid-February 1922 and was merged with WJZ, with RCA now assuming half of WJZ's expenses. However, within a few months a large number of additional broadcasting stations began operating on 360 meters, and WJZ was stubborn about having to share "its" wavelength. In May 1922 a proposed time-sharing agreement among 15 local stations assigned more than half of the available airtime to WJZ, but the station did not feel this was sufficient, which in turn led the Radio Broadcasting Society of America to petition that WJZ's license be canceled for being uncooperative.

There were no formal standards in the United States defining broadcasting stations until December 1, 1921, when the Department of Commerce—which regulated radio at this time—issued a regulation specifying that stations making broadcasts intended for the general public now had to hold a Limited Commercial license that authorized operation on 360 or 485 meters. WJZ was one of a small number of stations that already met this standard at the time of its adoption. It was also the second-oldest of the two licenses previously issued for the state of New Jersey, preceded by RCA's WDY grant. However, WJZ was the first to go on the air, as WDY did not begin operations until 2 1/2 months after WJZ's debut.

WJZ had difficulty convincing New York City performers – who were not paid – to make the trek to Newark, so on February 5, 1922, a more convenient remote studio was opened at the Waldorf-Astoria, located on Fifth Avenue and 34th Street. The American Telephone & Telegraph Company (AT&T) was unwilling to provide a telephone line to connect the Waldorf-Astoria studio to the Newark transmitter, so the link was instead made using specially prepared telegraph wires provided by Western Union. However, this expedient only provided marginal audio quality, and "the line was so noisy that when Newcomb Carleton, the president of Western Union, broadcast over it, his voice was completely drowned out".

On March 15, 1922, WJZ broadcast a studio performance of Mozart's Impresario, probably the first full-length opera broadcast in the New York City area. In October 1922, the station aired its second World Series, this time also feeding it to WGY in Schenectady, New York. Shortly after midnight on December 9, 1922, WJZ became the first broadcasting station confirmed to have been heard in Europe, consisting of a short program featuring greetings from the British consul in New York to British listeners and Vaughn De Leath singing her "Oliver Twist" song.

=== WJZ New York City (1923–1953) ===
==== Takeover by RCA ====
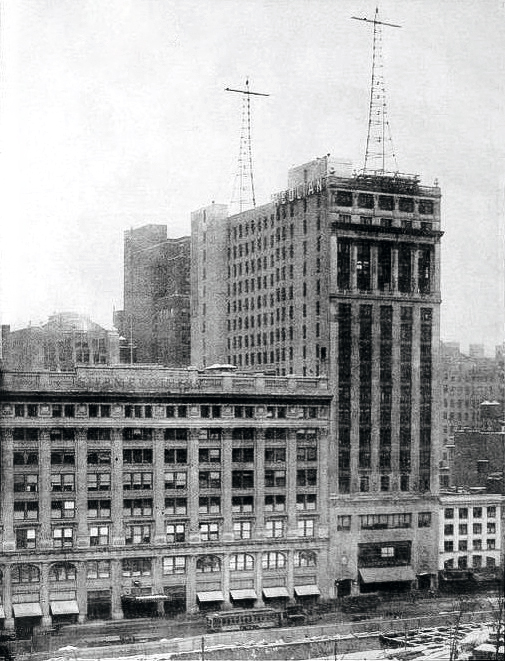
Beginning in May 1923 the WJZ studios and towers were located (along with WJY) at Aeolian Hall in New York City.

May 15, 1923, saw a number of simultaneous major changes. Most notably, on this day the station moved from Newark to New York City, and the ownership was changed from joint Westinghouse-RCA responsibility to full control by RCA. WJZ moved to studios on the sixth floor of the building where the Aeolian Hall was located, and station publicity heralded the upgrade: "Located in the heart of the city's musical and theatrical district, where entertainment of the highest order is ever available, this station will offer to the American public the most elaborate radio programs yet attempted and with a degree of faithfulness in reproduction that marks the beginning of a new era in radio broadcasting." This was also the day that the Department of Commerce implemented an expansion of the broadcast band, which now consisted of a range of transmitting frequencies from 550 to 1350 kHz, with WJZ assigned the sole use of 660. Finally, a sister station with the call letters of WJY operating on 740, was established, which shared the "Broadcast Central" Aeolian Hall studios, with WJZ providing more serious programming, and WJY's offerings considered more informal.

Program logs from May 15 to December 31, 1923, show WJZ aired 3,426 programs, including 723 talks, 67 church services, 205 bedtime stories and 21 sports events. Many of the broadcasts were musical and ranged from Carnegie Hall and Aeolian Hall recitals to harmonica and banjo solos.

As part of the move to Aeolian Hall, WJZ's transmitting antenna was constructed atop the building, but the location in the middle of New York City proved to be a poor choice. At the end of 1925, the station began operations from a new transmitter site located at Bound Brook, New Jersey. WJZ did not operate regularly at 50,000 watts until 1935.

==== Initial network operations ====
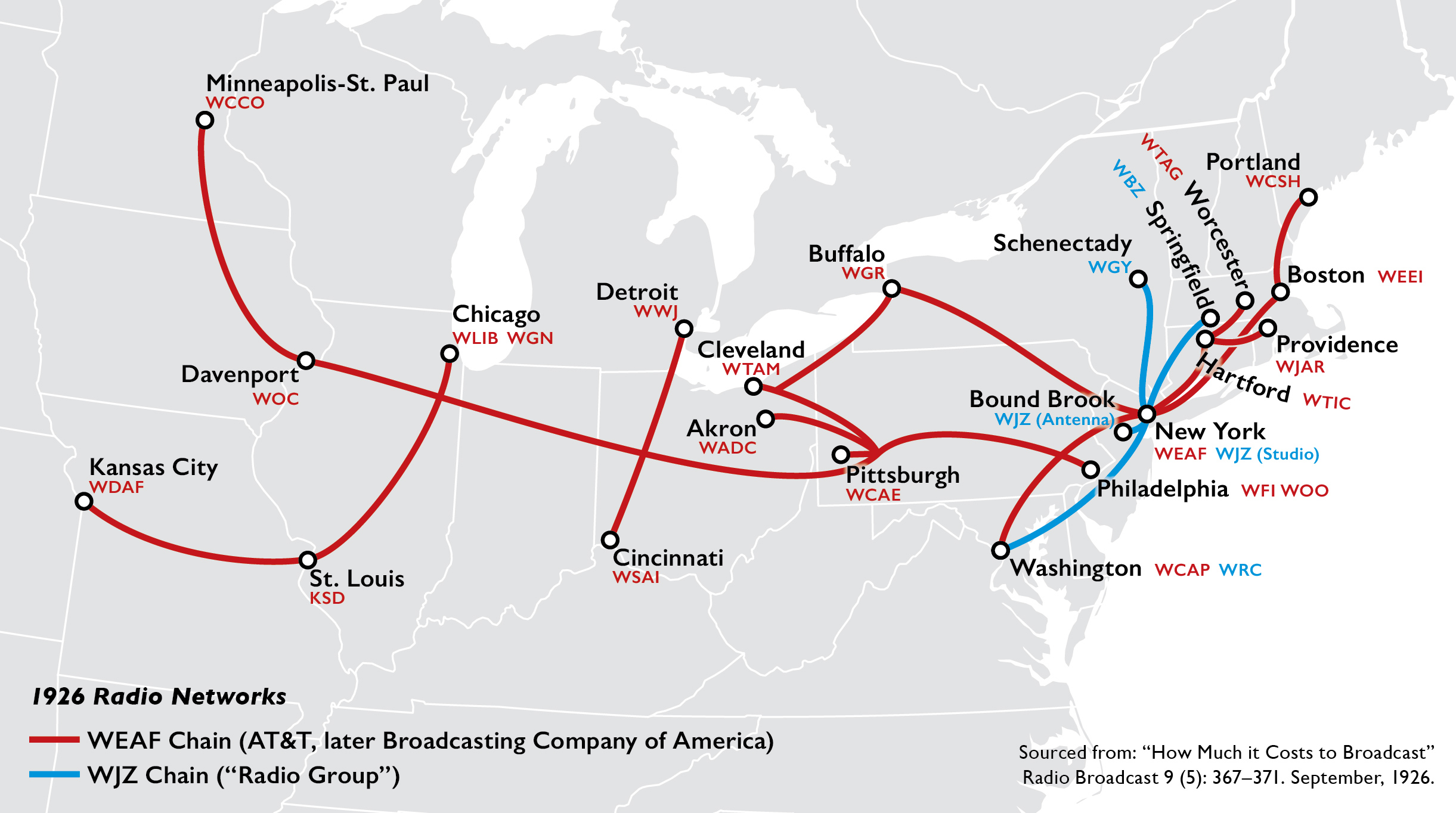
Early broadcast chains for WJZ and WEAF, 1926

Westinghouse and RCA's original financing plan envisioned that profits from receiver sales would provide the funds for broadcast station operations, but this revenue soon became insufficient. In 1922, AT&T adopted a more practical approach, of selling airtime, which it called "toll broadcasting", in addition to connecting stations together using telephone lines to form a radio network that could broadcast programs simultaneously to multiple sites. This first radio network was called the "WEAF chain", named after the flagship AT&T station (later WNBC), located in New York City.

RCA, along with its "radio group" allies of Westinghouse and General Electric, responded by creating a small network of its own, centered on WJZ. Due to AT&T's interpretation of a patent-rights cross-licensing agreement, the telephone company claimed the sole right to sell airtime, so WJZ was not able to charge for advertising, and again there were technical limitations, since the network had to use inferior telegraph lines to interconnect its stations.

==== NBC-Blue network flagship years ====
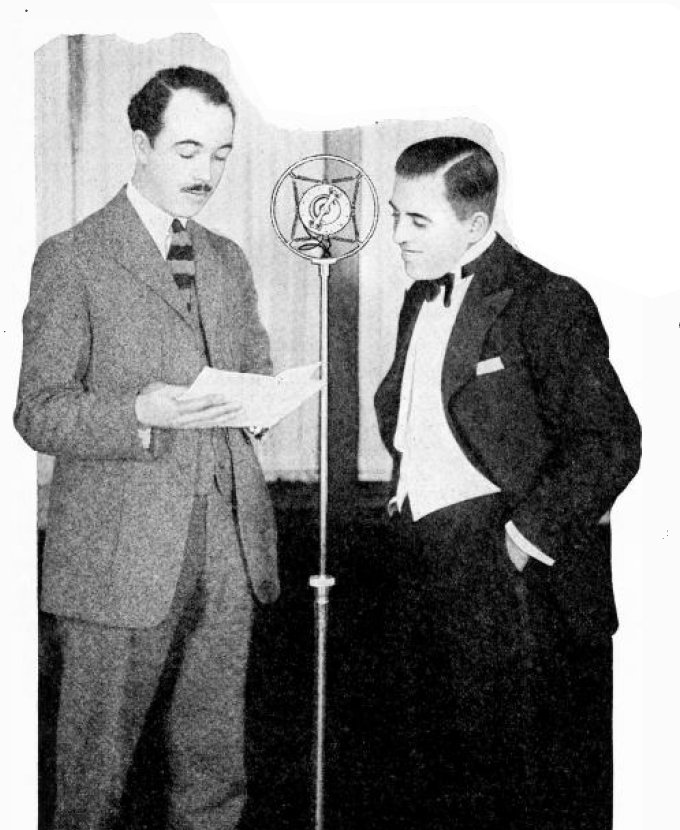
Bandleader George Olsen (right) being interviewed at WJZ in 1926

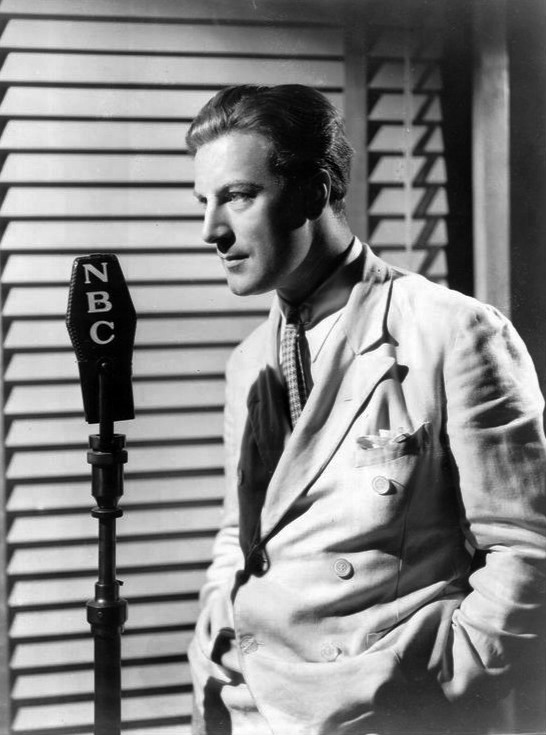
Actor and vocalist Dennis King had a weekly network radio program on WJZ in 1934

In the summer of 1926, AT&T decided to withdraw from the broadcasting field, and sold its stations and network operations to RCA. Included with this sale was the right to sell advertising time, and access to telephone lines for radio network connections. The earlier network operations were reorganized as the National Broadcasting Company (NBC), with the primary network, now known as the NBC Red Network, originating from WEAF. A second network, known as the NBC Blue Network, with WJZ as the originating station, debuted on January 1, 1927. (The WJY sister station was quietly discontinued at this time.) In October 1927, WJZ moved into NBC studios still under construction at 711 Fifth Avenue. A month later, WEAF joined WJZ, and both were together under one roof. On November 11, 1928, as part of a general station reassignment produced by the Federal Radio Commission's General Order 40, WJZ moved to 760 kHz.

On March 24, 1932, WJZ claimed to be the first radio station to broadcast a program from aboard a moving train; the station aired a variety show produced aboard a Baltimore and Ohio Railroad passenger train travelling through Maryland. In November 1933, WJZ, WEAF plus the NBC and RCA corporate headquarters moved to 30 Rockefeller Plaza.

In March 1941, under the provisions of the North American Regional Broadcasting Agreement, stations assigned to 760 kHz were shifted to 770 kHz, with WJZ designated as a Class I-A clear-channel station, thus the only station allowed to operate at night on this frequency. However, the following November the Federal Communications Commission (FCC) moved KOB in Albuquerque, New Mexico, which prior to the 1941 reassignment had also been a clear channel station, from 1030 kHz to 770 kHz, after it was found that there was too much nighttime interference between it and WBZ in Boston on their shared frequency. WJZ soon complained about the interference KOB was causing to its distant nighttime coverage, starting a dispute that would last for 38 years. In 1958 the FCC attempted to rectify the matter by designating the now-WABC and KOB as co-equal occupants of 770 kHz, with both stations required to protect each other's coverage as "Class I-B" stations. WABC appealed this decision, and through a series of legal battles was ultimately successful in maintaining its status as an unrestricted Class I-A station. In 1976 the FCC designated KOB as a Class II-A, station, requiring it to operate with a directional antenna at night to protect WABC's coverage. KOB unsuccessfully appealed this on the grounds that it should have been assigned the frequency's Class I-A assignment, and the case was finally settled in 1980, with the courts siding with the FCC decision. However, that same year as part of a general review of clear channel operations, the FCC also reduced nighttime protected coverage for clear channel stations from unlimited to 750 miles (1,207 km) from their transmitters, opening up the band to nighttime operation by additional distant stations.

WJZ and the Blue Network presented many of America's most popular programs, such as Lowell Thomas and the News, Amos 'n' Andy, Little Orphan Annie, America's Town Meeting of the Air, and Death Valley Days. Each midday, The National Farm and Home Hour brought news and entertainment to rural listeners. Ted Malone read poetry and Milton Cross conveyed children "Coast To Coast on a Bus", as well as bringing opera lovers the Saturday matinée Metropolitan Opera radio broadcasts. Cross would continue to host the Met on NBC, ABC, CBS and NPR until his passing at the beginning of 1975.

Occasionally, a show would premiere on NBC Blue, which had a weaker lineup of stations nationwide, and be shifted to the Red Network if it grew in popularity. Fibber McGee and Molly is one example.

When the FCC limited broadcast stations to 50 kW, a 500 kW transmitter built by RCA for WJZ was no longer allowed. The transmitter was sold by RCA to Britain and used for wartime Black Propaganda; broadcasting as Soldatensender Calais a purported German military station.

=== Birth of ABC ===
In 1942, the FCC ruled that no broadcaster could own more than one AM, one FM and one television station in a single market. On January 23, 1942, the FCC approved the transfer of WJZ's operating license from Radio Corporation of America to the Blue Network, Inc. A year later, on October 12, 1943, WJZ and the NBC Blue Network were sold to Edward J. Noble, then the owner of WMCA. This spun off network was simply called "The Blue Network" for little over a year.

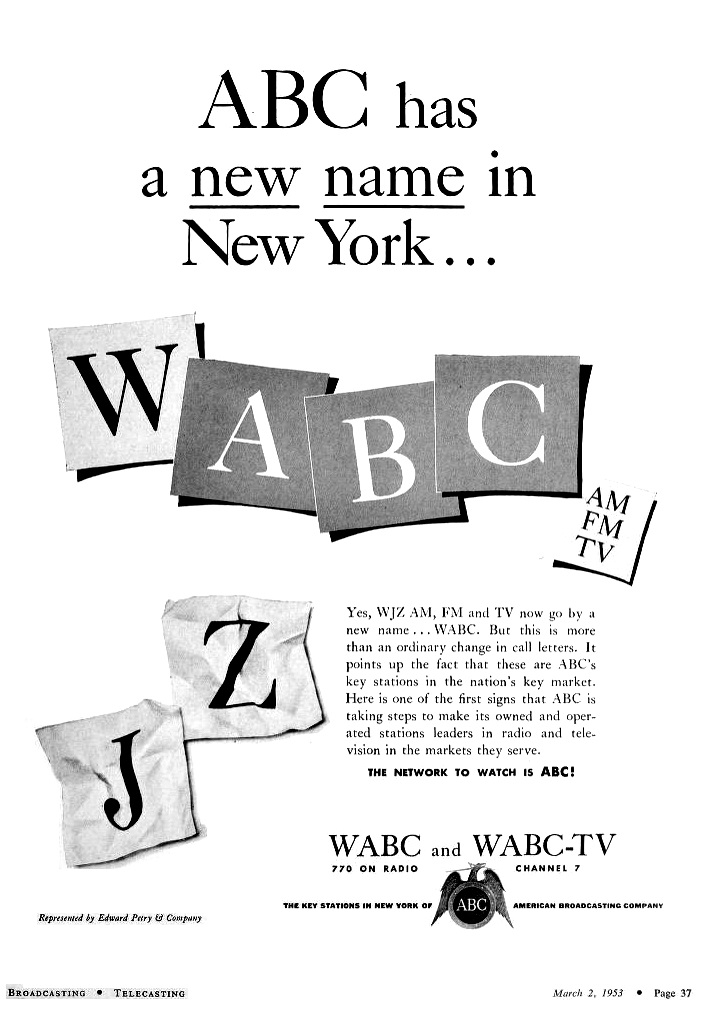
1953 advertisement announcing the call letter change from WJZ to WABC.

On June 15, 1945, "The Blue Network" was officially rechristened the American Broadcasting Company (ABC), when negotiations were completed with George B. Storer, who had owned the defunct American Broadcasting System and still owned the name. In November 1948, WJZ and the ABC network finally got a home of their own when studios were moved to a renovated building at 7 West 66th Street.

On March 1, 1953, WJZ changed its call letters to WABC, after the FCC approved ABC's merger with United Paramount Theatres, the movie theater chain owned by Paramount Pictures which, like the Blue Network, was divested under government order. The WABC call letters were previously used on CBS Radio's New York City AM and FM outlets, reflecting an earlier owner, the Atlantic Broadcasting Company. On November 1, 1946, WABC (AM) changed its call sign to WCBS, and the FM station became WCBS-FM.

In 1957, several years after WJZ's callsign change to WABC, Westinghouse Broadcasting acquired WAAM-TV in Baltimore, Maryland, and applied to change the calls to WJZ-TV, in honor of its former pioneer radio station. The FCC waived existing rules and granted this request to restore a three-letter callsign years after being retired on an unrelated station in a different market, albeit with a "-TV" suffix (perhaps because Westinghouse was highly regarded as a licensee by both the industry and the FCC at that time), and the Baltimore TV station, now owned and operated by CBS, retains the call letters to this day.

=== WABC's first era (1953–1960) ===
Although WABC continued to air ABC programming during this time, ABC Radio – like the other major radio networks of that era – began to drop significant amounts of long-form comedy and dramatic programming, many of which migrated over to television. In response, WABC began using deejays playing recorded music in greater frequency. Some programs featured middle of the road music, including Broadway and Hollywood showtunes and popular music, while other portions of the schedule included ABC Radio's remaining long–form newscasts and dramatic program lineup, in tandem with CBS Radio's WCBS and NBC Radio's WNBC.

(This would continue until 1960, as the Musicradio 77 era formally began, but WABC was still required to carry several of ABC Radio's non–music and entertainment shows, including the long–running Don McNeill's Breakfast Club during the 10:00 am hour, and a long–form news block in the afternoon–drive period. While this was not an issue prior to 1960, such commitments created a programming clash with the Top 40 format up until the network was dissected into four sub–networks in 1968.)

In 1958–1959, rock'n'roll disk jockey Alan Freed hosted a daily evening show on WABC, which was similar in format and musical policy to the early rock shows he had hosted on WJW in Cleveland, and later WINS in New York. Freed's time at WABC ended when he was caught up in the investigation of the "payola" scandals of the era; he was terminated in November 1959. Although payola was not illegal at the time, the termination occurred because Freed had refused to sign a statement admitting that he had accepted bribes.

At different times in the pre-top-40 era, comedian Ernie Kovacs and dean of early disc jockeys Martin Block were heard on the station.

=== The Musicradio 77 era (1960–1982) ===
==== Early years ====
When Harold L. Neal, Jr. was named general manager of WABC, he was charged with making WABC successful in terms of both audience and profits. Neal had been at WXYZ in Detroit. By 1960, WABC was committed to a nearly full-time schedule of top-40 songs played by upbeat personalities. Still, WABC played popular non-rock and roll songs as well, provided they scored well on the Top 40 charts. WABC's early days as a Top 40 station were humble ones.

WINS was the No. 1 hit music station and WMCA, which did a similar rock leaning top 40 format, was also a formidable competitor, while WABC barely ranked in the Top Ten. Fortunately for WABC, the other Top 40 outlets could not be heard as well in more distant New York and New Jersey suburbs, since WINS, WMGM, and WMCA were all directional stations. WABC, with its 50,000-watt non-directional signal, had the advantage of being heard in places west, south, and northwest of New York City, a huge chunk of the growing suburban population and this is where the station began to draw ratings. Early in 1962, WMGM, owned by Loew's, which then owned MGM, was sold to Storer Broadcasting. Upon its sale, WMGM reverted to its original WHN call letters and switched to a middle of the road music format playing mostly non-rock artists such as Frank Sinatra, Nat King Cole and Andy Williams.

Sam Holman was the first WABC program director of this era. Under Holman, WABC achieved No. 1 ratings during much of 1962, after WMGM reverted to WHN. By the summer of 1963, WMCA led the pack among contemporary stations, with WABC at No. 2 and WINS slipping to third place. It has been said, but is difficult to verify, that WMCA dominated in the city proper, while WABC owned the suburbs. This would be consistent with WMCA's 5,000-watt directional signal.

==== Dominant years ====
Hal Neal hired Rick Sklar as WABC's program director. He would go on to become a member of the National Radio Hall of Fame and be credited as one of the pioneering architects of the Top 40 format. Under Sklar, the station went to the shortest playlist of any contemporary music station in history. The number one song was heard about every hour during the day and every 75 minutes or so at night. The other top 5 songs were heard nearly as often. Other current songs averaged once to twice per airshift. The station played about 9 current hits per hour and several non-current songs. The non-currents were no more than 5 years old and the station played about 70 of them in total. In his book Rockin' America, Sklar said he was sensitive to payola concerns and advanced airplay. Through the years, WABC was known by various slogans, "Channel 77 WABC" and later "Musicradio 77 WABC". Due to the high number of commercials each hour, WABC played no more than two songs in a row and there was frequent DJ talk and personality between every song. The station averaged 6 commercial breaks per hour but they were no more than 3 ads in a row. Often the air personalities delivered live commercials in their own humorous style, so that listeners would consider the spot part of the entertainment. In addition, between songs, disc jockeys were required to provide so-called program matter. Program matter could include a time check, a weather report or simply some disc jockey banter, which enabled the disc jockeys to inject their personalities and humor into their shows.

Early 1960s disc jockeys included Dan Ingram, Herb Oscar Anderson, Charlie Greer, Scott Muni, Chuck Dunaway, Jack Carney, Bruce "Cousin Brucie" Morrow and Bob "Bobaloo" Lewis. But some of the best known WABC DJs are the ones that followed them in the mid-1960s and 1970s: Harry Harrison, Ron Lundy, Chuck Leonard (one of the earliest African-American DJs to be on the staff of a major mainstream radio station), Johnny Donovan, Bob Cruz (a Dan Ingram sound alike), Frank Kingston Smith, Roby Yonge, George Michael, Jim Nettleton, Jim Perry and Steve O'Brien. Meanwhile, "Radio Hall of Fame" member Dan Ingram, perhaps WABC's best known DJ, was held over from the early staff, being heard in the afternoon for much of WABC's Top 40 history. Noted sportscaster Howard Cosell did a brief weekday evening sportscast on WABC, as well as hosting a late Sunday night interview show called "Speaking of Everything".

Especially in the afternoons and evenings, WABC was the station that teenagers could be heard listening to on transistor radios all over the New York metropolitan area. Due to its strong signal, the station could be heard easily over 100 miles away, including the Catskill and Pocono Mountains, and through much of Connecticut and Rhode Island. After sunset, when AM radio waves travel farther, WABC's signal could be picked up around much of the Eastern U.S. and Canada. Bruce Morrow often spoke about how he felt an almost psychic bond to his young listeners.

An aircheck of WABC from August 1964, features some of the DJs speaking from a window of The Beatles' hotel room at the Hotel Delmonico during their second visit to New York City, while Dan Ingram, back in the studio, played WABC jingles to thousands of teenagers in the streets below, who enthusiastically sang along with them. Ingram later noted that this was actually illegal under FCC rules, but said that they did not know it at the time. In the wake of the success of "W-A-Beatle-C" (as it was briefly called around the time of the Beatles' U.S. visit), competitor WINS finally dropped out of the Top 40 battle in 1965, adopting an all-news format. The ABC television network also called itself "A-Beatles-C" whenever it promoted airings of Beatles-related films.

Just before the famous Northeast blackout of 1965, Dan Ingram noted that the studio's electric power was fluctuating and he began having fun with the slowed-down music. After playing "Everyone's Gone to the Moon" by Jonathan King, he quipped it was played "in the key of R". Ingram then proceeded to run some recorded commercials and a portion of Si Zentner's "Up a Lazy River", backtimed to the news, while commenting on how everything seemed to be running slower than normal. During the 6 pm newscast, WABC left the air as the outage settled in for real. Ingram later drove out to the transmitter site in Lodi, New Jersey, with a box of records, and continued his show from the backup studio housed there.

In the 1970s, WABC was either No. 1 or No. 2 consistently, often trading places with WOR. Once in a while, a station attracting an older audience (like WOR or WPAT) would move into the top spot. These stations were not truly WABC's direct competitors because they targeted a much older audience. Chief competitor WMCA began running evening talk by 1968 and stopped playing top 40 music altogether in the fall of 1970. Then in 1971, Country Music station WJRZ abruptly flipped to a Top 40 format and became known as WWDJ. That lasted until April 1974. WOR-FM evolved from progressive rock to Adult Top 40 playing the hits of 1955 to current product by 1968. They dropped most pre-1964 oldies in 1972 and became known as WXLO 99X. That station evolved into more on an Adult Contemporary format in 1979 and a Rhythmic Top 40 format in 1980. Other FM competitors like oldies station WCBS-FM, soul station WBLS, and album-oriented rock stations like WPLJ and WNEW-FM all did well in the ratings, but none rivalled WABC's success. AM competitor WNBC also never came close to WABC's audience during this period. WNBC then had a format similar to 99X playing Adult Top 40. In 1977, WNBC tried sounding younger and moved its format musically closer to WABC. Then by 1979 they tried sounding older and somewhere in-between. Until 1978, WABC remained dominant.

WABC's ratings strength came from its cumulative audience, what the radio industry calls "cume". Most listeners did not stay with WABC for long periods of time, as the station had some of the shortest "time spent listening" (or TSL) spans in the history of music radio—an average listener spent about 10 minutes listening to WABC. It was the price paid for a short playlist, and numerous commercials between songs (the large number of ads being due to WABC's large audience), but what WABC lacked in TSL it more than made up for with its sheer number of listeners. By 1975, WABC tried becoming more music-intensive, reducing commercial breaks to three per hour. It began playing 3 to 5 songs in a row, still mixed with talk and personality, but done in a tighter manner.

Fed up with the short playlist, Cousin Brucie left in August 1974 to defect to rival WNBC. Rick Sklar was promoted in 1976 to vice president of programming for ABC Radio, and his assistant program director Glenn Morgan became WABC's program director. The station's influence could be found in odd places: Philip Glass' 1976 opera, Einstein on the Beach, has as part of the background a recitation of WABC's DJ schedule in the 1960s.

==== "Disco" era ====
The end of the 1970s found FM radio beginning to overtake AM music stations in most markets. In June 1975, an FM station on 92.3, owned by the San Juan (Puerto Rico) Racing Association flipped to Soft Rock and became known as Mellow 92 WKTU. That station had very low ratings and had no effect on WABC. On July 24, 1978, at 6 pm, WKTU abruptly dropped its Soft Rock format in favor of a disco-based top 40 format known as "Disco 92". By December of that year, WABC was unseated, as WKTU became the No. 1 station in New York City. The first "disco" ratings saw WKTU with 11 percent of the listening audience—a huge number anywhere, let alone in a market the size of New York City—and WABC dropping from 4.1 million listeners to 3 million, losing 25 percent of its audience practically overnight. In February 1979, WABC began broadcasting in AM stereo using the Kahn-Hazeltine C-QUAM system.

After this initial ratings tumble, WABC panicked and began mixing in several extended disco mixes per hour and sometimes played two back-to-back. Some of the disco songs ran in excess of eight minutes. What regular listeners heard was a major change in sound. While the station continued playing non-disco and rock songs about a third of the time, the station's familiar format had seemed to disappear and as a result, WABC began to lose its identity. In late spring 1979, Billboard magazine reported that Rick Sklar had demoted program director Glenn Morgan to "moving carts" instead of making programming decisions. WABC's numbers dropped for four consecutive ratings periods.

On August 2, 1979, the Donna Summer disco hit "MacArthur Park" was playing during Dan Ingram's afternoon drive program. During the song, DJ George Michael (who also was a sports reporter) interrupted to break the news that New York Yankees catcher and team captain Thurman Munson had died in a plane crash. In late summer, WABC moved, temporarily, back to its tight playlists.

That fall, Al Brady took over as programming director of WABC. He had come from WHDH Boston, where he evolved that station from MOR to more of an adult contemporary music format. At WABC, he added a huge amount of music and went as far back as 1964. He added The Beatles, Motown 1960s hits, 1970s rock hits, a few album rock cuts, and basically deepened WABC's music. The same amount of current hits still got played but less often and about 40%. That November, he let Harry Harrison, George Michael, and Chuck Leonard go. He made a couple shifts longer, moved Dan Ingram to mornings, moved Bob Cruz from overnights to afternoons, and hired Howard Hoffman for evenings. For overnights he hired Sturgis Griffin and eliminated the late night shift merging that with evenings and overnights. In the first six months of 1980, ratings were slightly up and stable. Also, Brady made a deal for WABC to air New York Yankees baseball beginning the next year in 1981, though the station carried a few Yankee games from 1010 WINS during Republican Convention week in 1980. It was the first sign of the beginning of the end for the music format of WABC.

==== "77 WABC, New York's Radio Station" and the transition to talk ====
Brady left WABC in July 1980 and soon became general manager of WYNY, which by then had a similar format to its sister station WNBC, as well as WABC. That fall, Jay Clark took over as program director at WABC, and Jeff Mazzei arrived as assistant program director from WNEW (which was moving from adult contemporary to big bands and standards).

Under Clark, the station played current music leaning toward a more Adult Contemporary sound, trying to appeal to a slightly older audience, as most younger listeners were listening to FM stations. Part of the reason was the top 40 chart was leaning that way at that point as well. WABC still played rock and soul crossovers in moderation, but began to move away from album cuts and more toward 1960s and 1970s oldies. In September 1980, they also dropped the "Musicradio WABC" slogan and became "77 WABC, New York's Radio Station" (though they called themselves New York's radio station at times as Musicradio), the apparent implication being that the station was more than just music.

By early 1981, WABC's cumulative audience was down to 2.5 million—rival WNBC, a perennial also-ran, was by this time beating them with 3 million. Fewer people were tuning into WABC, listeners who had switched to FM were not coming back, and, while still moderately successful, the ship was sinking. Like Brady, Clark tried to improve the time-spent-listening. In March 1981, Cruz departed, Ingram went back to afternoon drive time, and the team of Ross Brittain and Brian Wilson from Atlanta moved into morning drive. Ross and Wilson, as the show was known, was very information-oriented, playing exactly four songs in an hour except on Saturdays when they played the usual 12 or so songs an hour. A week later, the station also began airing a weeknight sports-talk show with Art Rust, Jr. from 7:00 p.m. to 9:00 p.m. WABC's ratings by this point were mediocre and they were still going down.

Also, that March, WABC became the full-time flagship radio outlet for Yankees baseball games, a distinction the station carried through the end of the 2001 season. This would be the longest continuous relationship the team would have with any flagship station (to date). Clark reasoned that Yankee baseball would bring back some listeners to the station and that they would recycle back into the music format, but not even the "Bronx Bombers" could save music on WABC.

In the fall of 1981, WABC dropped the remaining heavy-rock cuts and non-crossover urban hits, and began playing more oldies, as well as songs from the adult contemporary chart, and added an "advice" talk show with Dr. Judy Kuriansky from 9:00 p.m. to midnight on weeknights. Hoffman and Griffin exited at this point. By then, WABC was almost unrecognizable as a Top 40 station, the ratings were languishing, and rumors, which began as far back as 1979 were rampant that the station would be changing its format to talk and news sooner or later. By early 1982 it looked sooner than later. The management at ABC denied the rumors but did state that plans were to modify WABC into a full service AC format with music by day and talk evenings and overnights like KDKA in Pittsburgh was doing. Once a week beginning in February, WABC was auditioning prospective talk shows for the Midnight to 2:00 a.m. time slot.

In February 1982, WABC officially confirmed it would be going to an all-talk format that May and stated that there would be ample notice before the switch happened. At that point the once-a-week overnight auditions for talk shows ended and WABC continued playing music overnights until the switch. The airstaff began saying goodbye with a comment here and there. Finally, on April 30, it was announced that the switch to all-talk would occur on May 10 at noon. From May 7 to 9, the departing air-staffers said their goodbyes one last time. The official music format ended 10:45 p.m. on May 9, 1982. The station aired a Yankee game that day at Seattle. From 2:00 a.m. to 5:30 a.m. they ran the normal Sunday evening public affairs programs preempted due to the Yankee game. Ross & Wilson played their usual 4 songs. Staffers that departed included Lundy, Ingram, Marc Sommers and Peter Bush. Mazzei left for a similar position at WCBS-FM where he would stay for well over 25 years. Sommers also went to WCBS-FM and eventually Lundy and Ingram would join him there. Donovan and Mike McKay remained at WABC as staff announcers and producers. McKay left WABC in 1984 for RKO Radio Network and Donovan stayed at WABC until his retirement in 2015.

On Monday, May 10, 1982, WABC stopped playing music, ending its 22–year run as a music station with a 9:00 a.m.–noon farewell show hosted by Ingram and Lundy. The last song played on WABC before the format change was "Imagine" by John Lennon, followed by the familiar WABC "Chime Time" jingle, then a few seconds of silence followed by a minute jingle for talk radio before the debut of the new talk format.

=== The NewsTalkRadio 77 era (1982–present) ===
==== Early years and success ====
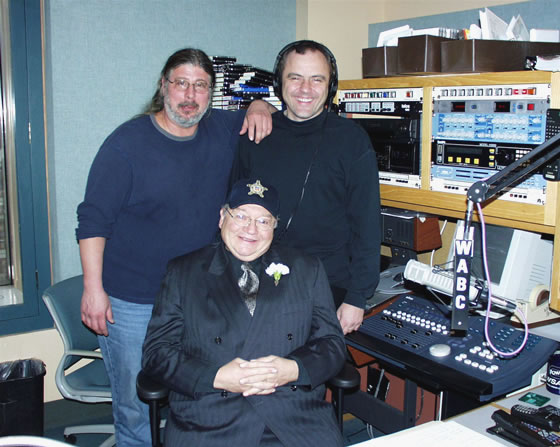
US Representative Gary Ackerman (sitting) with Curtis Sliwa (right) and Ron Kuby (left) in 2005

Initially after the format change, the station ran satellite talk shows from corporate ABC's "Talk Radio" network. Initially, WABC's lineup consisted of Ross and Wilson until 10 am, Owen Spann from Satellite until noon, Art Athens and News until 1 pm, Money Management talk until 2 pm, Los Angeles-based host Michael Jackson (no relation to the pop star) from satellite until 4 pm, another advice show with Dr. Toni Grant from satellite until 6 pm, and ending with a half-hour of news at 6. Sports Talk began at 6:30 p.m. and remained on until 9 pm. Doctor Judy remained in her time slot. Overnights were hosted by Alan Colmes, who played some music initially, but stopped doing so by mid-1983. At that time, Colmes was less politically based and more entertainment-based. Weekends had Child Psychology advice shows (Dr. Lawrance Balter), Home and Garden shows, talk about religion (Religion on the Line), and of course, the Yankees.

Ross and Wilson stayed on and continued to play 4 songs per hour (mostly 1960s and 1970s hits but also some currents) throughout 1982. In 1983, they stopped playing music as well. Ross and Wilson split up in 1983 when Ross went over to WHTZ. While the station's final ratings as a music station were mediocre, its talk ratings initially were even lower. Jay Clark was terminated and replaced with then assistant program director, Mark Mason.

Still, the station stuck with the new format. After Brian Wilson left in 1984, Alan Colmes moved to mornings. Mark Mason left for a similar post at All-News WINS. He was replaced by John Mainelli and at that point they dropped satellite programming. They added more issues-oriented talk shows, with an increasing number of conservative talk show hosts, although several liberals, including Colmes and Lynn Samuels, also hosted shows. The ratings grew and by the late 1980s, they were a very successful talk station.

From 1984 to 1996 WABC broadcast the popular Bob Grant, a controversial, early "right-wing" talk radio host. After years of what many considered inflammatory remarks, he was fired in 1996 for a controversial comment regarding the death of United States Secretary of Commerce Ron Brown. After a number of years at competitor station WOR, Grant returned as a host as of July 2007, was removed again in December 2008, and returned again as a weekend host in September 2009. Alan Colmes would leave in 1985 and by 1987 he emerged at WNBC on overnights, where he played moderate amounts of music. He would move to afternoons on WNBC and eventually drop music there as well. He was on the air at WNBC's sign off in 1988. Colmes eventually returned to WABC.

Within its first years, the revamped WABC brought in Rush Limbaugh, who would go on to be the anchor program of the local station for two decades, and soon after the giant of talk syndication, the model for countless other conservative radio shows to follow. In the early 1990s Phil Boyce took over as program director.

Starting in 1997, civil rights attorney Ron Kuby and Guardian Angels' founder Curtis Sliwa co-hosted a WABC radio show on Monday through Friday from 6 to 7 p.m, and on Saturdays from 6 to 10 am.

On Saturday, September 8, 2001, John Batchelor presented a four-hour program on the attack on the USS Cole, identifying Osama bin Laden as the probable perpetrator. On September 12, Batchelor was invited to broadcast on WABC "until bin Laden is captured". The day bin Laden was caught, Batchelor and his executive producer were in Kraków; they continued on air and, with a hiatus in 2006, have been on air ever since, covering national and international security.

In 2004, the station earned the distinction of being a news/talk radio station even longer than it had been a Top 40 station, by marking 22 years in its present format.

==== Under Citadel and Cumulus ====
77 WABC logo prior to 2011

On February 6, 2006, the Walt Disney Company announced that it would sell WABC and other radio properties not affiliated with either Radio Disney or ESPN Radio, along with ABC Radio's News & Talk and FM networks, to Citadel Broadcasting for $2.7 billion. The transaction became final on June 12, 2007. Citadel merged with Cumulus Media on September 16, 2011.

In December 2007, Don Imus moved his program Imus in the Morning to WABC after 19 years at WFAN. Imus was fired from WFAN in April for controversial comments about Rutgers University's women's basketball team. Connell McShane (who had replaced Charles McCord following his retirement on May 5, 2011) served as sidekick and newscaster for the program, which was also simulcast on the Fox Business network. The Imus show aired for the final time on March 29, 2018.

In February 2010, WABC added Rabbi Shmuley Boteach and The Shmuley Show as a weekend program.

Geraldo Rivera became host of WABC's 10 a.m. to noon slot beginning January 3, 2012, replacing Joe Crummey. He was replaced with Fox News Radio's Brian Kilmeade in 2019.

On January 1, 2013, the traffic reports on WABC switched from Clear Channel's Total Traffic to Radiate Media's Right Now Traffic.

Limbaugh and Hannity departed WABC at the end of 2013. To fill Limbaugh's spot, WABC revived Curtis and Kuby. Curtis Sliwa had been hosting the morning show at WNYM since his departure from WABC, while Ron Kuby had for the most part been a commentator on various news shows since his show on Air America Radio was cancelled. Kuby was laid off in 2017; Sliwa would subsequently be paired on-air with Rita Cosby, followed by current co-host Juliet Huddy.

==== Acquisition by Red Apple Media ====
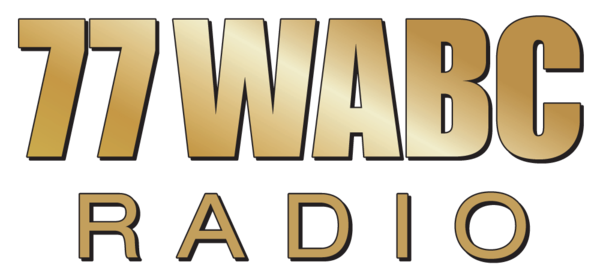
77 WABC logo prior to 2020

On June 27, 2019, as part of a downsizing of its operations in New York City to cover its debt (which also saw the sale of sister station WPLJ to Christian radio network K-Love earlier in the year), Cumulus announced that it would sell WABC to local business magnate John Catsimatidis for $12.5 million in cash, via his new company Red Apple Media. The sale closed on March 2, 2020. Catsimatidis stated that he had grown up with the station and considered it "iconic", indicating that he wanted to "bring [WABC] back to being a great station", and use it as a potential starting point for further investments in radio.

Following the takeover, Catsimatidis oversaw a number of changes to WABC's operations; it reduced the amount of commercials carried per-hour to only six-to-eight minutes, and began to drop syndicated Westwood One shows in favor of local programs. Red Eye Radio was replaced with the locally-produced overnight show The Other Side of Midnight with Mark Morano, The Ben Shapiro Show was replaced by a new afternoon block featuring former mayor Rudy Giuliani, Bo Snerdley, and Catsimatidis. After John Batchelor left Westwood One in 2021, Rita Cosby returned to host a new program in its place. Time-brokered programming on weekends was also replaced by local weekly shows, while a Saturday-night oldies block would feature shows hosted by Tony Orlando and veteran WABC disk jockey Cousin Brucie; Catsimatidis explained that "Saturday night people need a little time to relax, and turn it off".

Catsimatidis also focused on expanding distribution of WABC's programming, including via internet radio, podcasts, and clips from its programs on social media. In July 2020, Red Apple Media acquired WLIR-FM on Long Island and converted it to a near-simulcast of WABC, while Red Apple Audio Networks was launched in January 2022 to syndicate WABC's programs. In Nielsen Audio's winter 2025 ratings, WABC had a weekly cumulative listenership of around 415,000 listeners (the highest among AM radio stations in the U.S. that do not have an FM simulcast). Catsimatidis noted in 2023 that the station had a large number of loyal listeners, with many listening to WABC for an average of six hours per-day. While dropping brokered programming on weekends was estimated to have cost WABC around $2.3 million in revenue, its ratings in the daypart increased by 347%.

Catsimatidis' political views and vocal support of president Donald Trump has also influenced the station's programming; on December 26, 2025, Trump personally phoned into the Sid & Friends morning show—which Catsimatidis was guest hosting in place of Sid Rosenberg—to discuss the United States' missile strikes in Nigeria and defend its boat strikes near Venezuela. During the 2025 New York City mayoral election campaign, station personalities such as Catsimatidis and Rosenberg regularly criticized candidate Zohran Mamdani, and primarily endorsed Andrew Cuomo.

In May 2026, Red Apple Media announced that it would form a radio news service known as the Worldwide News Network, with WABC as flagship. The service was announced in the wake of the imminent closure of CBS News Radio on May 22, and launched immediately afterward on May 23; it offers bulletins at the top and bottom of the hour, as well as breaking news coverage. It was initially led by former WINS anchor Lee Harris, who was hired as WABC's vice president of news. Its initial airstaff also features multiple anchors who previously worked for CBS News and CBS News Radio.

== Programming ==
=== Weekdays ===
The station features a lineup of conservative talk shows, including WABC personalities Sid Rosenberg, Rita Cosby, Dominic Carter, Bo Snerdley, Anthony Cumia and station owner John Catsimatidis. The station also airs Brian Kilmeade, Greg Kelly, Bill O'Reilly and The Mark Levin Show.

In July 2020, Frank Morano began hosting a self-titled program on Sunday evenings, and began hosting an overnight show, The Other Side of Midnight, in October 2020 (replacing Westwood One's overnight show Red Eye Radio). In January 2021, WABC revamped its daily lineup, with Morano and Juliet Huddy co-hosting the 77 WABC Early News at 5 a.m, and The Ben Shapiro Show replaced by local hours hosted by former mayor of New York City Rudy Giuliani, the station's editorial manager Lidia Curanaj, and Catsimatidis. In March 2021, Curtis Sliwa was placed on hiatus to comply with equal-time rules after launching a mayoral campaign; his show was replaced by a noon-hour show hosted by Dominic Carter, and an afternoon show hosted by former WNYW personality and current Newsmax TV host Greg Kelly. John Batchelor's show was also cancelled by Westwood One, with Rita Cosby rejoining WABC to host a new nighttime show in his place. In April 2021, Carter's noon hour was replaced by The Charlie Kirk Show. On August 23, 2021, Curanaj was replaced by James "Bo Snerdley" Golden.

In February 2022, Curtis Sliwa returned to WABC, hosting the new weekend show The Left vs. The Right with former New York congressman Anthony Weiner. In February 2023, Rita Cosby joined Catsimatidis's 5 p.m. show Cats at Night as a co-host, with the show becoming Cats & Cosby. In March 2023, Noam Laden returned to WABC as news director and host of the 5 a.m. WABC News Hour.

On May 10, 2024, Guiliani was dropped by WABC for continuing to discuss conspiracies regarding the 2020 presidential election in his show, despite repeated warnings by Catsimatidis to not discuss the topic on-air. In June 2024, WABC announced that Dominic Carter would become the new host of the 3 p.m. hour, replacing Guiliani. In February 2025, Morano and Silwa's shows were pulled from WABC's local lineup after they launched campaigns for city council and mayor respectively, but continued to air in syndication. That month, WABC also hired Roger Stone to host the new weeknight show The Stone Zone, and former Opie and Anthony co-host Anthony Cumia to host a weekend show. In March 2025, former NYS governor David Paterson became a new permanent co-host for The Left vs. The Right. In June 2025, Morano was succeeded by Lionel as host of The Other Side of Midnight.

In September 2025, Joe Concha joined the weekend lineup to replace Jeanine Pirro. In October 2025, Curtis Sliwa resigned on-air during an interview on Sid & Friends, accusing the station's personalities of criticizing his mayoral campaign (including both Catsimatidis and host Sid Rosenberg having encouraged him to withdraw) and displaying a bias towards the Andrew Cuomo campaign. In February 2026, Concha began hosting a weeknight show. In February 2026, former White House press secretary Sean Spicer began hosting the new Sunday show Full Court Press. In April 2026, Lionel was replaced as host of The Other Side of Midnight by Walter Sterling, with Lionel transitioning to exclusively hosting the show's weekend edition Another Side of Midnight.

=== Sports programming ===
WABC currently does not carry any sports programming. The station's most recent sports contract, with the United States Military Academy for Army football games, expired at the end of the 2015 season. In addition to the aforementioned Yankees coverage, the station served two separate stints as the flagship for the New York Jets and was also the home of the New Jersey Devils beginning in 1988. WABC also previously carried Seton Hall University men's basketball, and the New York/New Jersey Hitmen of the original XFL football league.

Early in its Top 40 incarnation, WABC served as the original radio flagship of the New York Mets upon their establishment in 1962. A notable aspect of WABC's Mets coverage was Howard Cosell and former Brooklyn Dodgers pitcher Ralph Branca handling the pre- and post-game shows. The station lost those rights to WHN following the 1963 season.

The Jets first called WABC home in the 1980s, but left toward the end of the decade for WCBS. The team would return to the station in 2000 after spending the previous seven seasons on WFAN. After then-sister station WEPN became the Jets' flagship, WABC began simulcasting the games over its airwaves due to its stronger signal. The arrangement ended in 2008 as WEPN began simulcasting all its programming on two other stations.

In December 2001, broadcast rights to the Yankees were lost after 21 years to WCBS. WABC also lost the radio rights to the Devils in 2005, as New Jersey's hockey team moved to WFAN to substitute for the station's loss of the New York Rangers to WEPN. WABC served as an overflow station for the Rangers from 2005 through 2009, and also served the same purpose for the New York Knicks when their games moved from WFAN to WEPN, but those rights moved to WNYM in 2009. The loss of evening sports programming has forced WABC to attempt to solidify its evening talk lineup.

In April 2025, the station signed longtime New York Yankees radio broadcaster John Sterling to host a one-hour sports talk show on Saturday afternoons, marking a return to sports-themed programming after a 16-year hiatus. The show aired through the end of 2025.

=== Music programming ===
In 2020, the station began to add a block of oldies music programming on Saturday nights; the first program, Cousin Brucie's Saturday Night Rock & Roll Party, premiered on September 5, 2020, featuring veteran WABC DJ Bruce Morrow. In late October 2020, the station announced that Tony Orlando would host a two-hour show. Orlando's show was later relaunched through syndication in 2026 as Rockin' the Decades with Tony Orlando.

In December 2020, Joe Piscopo began hosting a Sunday-night adult standards show, Sunday Nights with Sinatra.

=== Previous programs ===
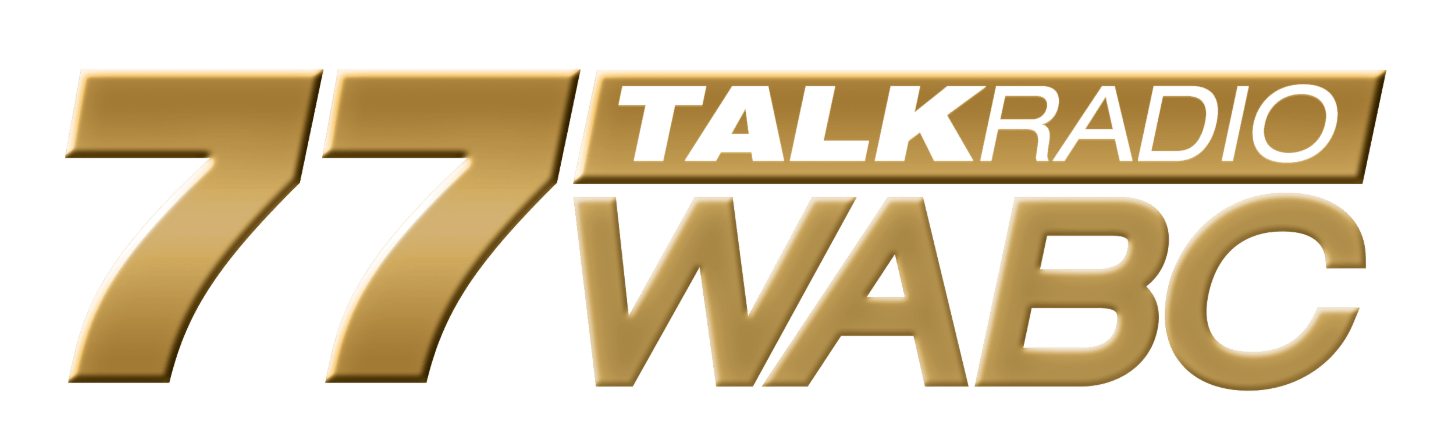
77 WABC logo used from 2020 to 2021

WABC was where the nationally syndicated programs hosted by Rush Limbaugh and Sean Hannity got their start, although those programs are now heard on WABC's talk radio rival in New York, WOR. Limbaugh's show was produced at WABC from 1988 until the early 2000s, when he started doing the program from Premiere Radio Networks and a studio in his home in South Florida (even then, until WABC dropped the program, substitute hosts for Limbaugh still used the WABC studios, and Limbaugh on occasion had hosted from WABC).. The station also served as the flagship for Imus in the Morning with Don Imus from 2007 to 2018. Imus' producer, Bernard McGuirk, co-hosted the WABC morning show following Imus's retirement until his own death in October 2022.

Although the station had good ratings, it underperformed in terms of total revenue, an example being WABC billing $21.3 million in 2008, not even close to industry giant KFI in Los Angeles at $54.4 million.

Phil Boyce departed as program director in October 2008, eventually replaced in February 2009 by former XM Satellite Radio programmer Laurie Cantillo. Laurie Cantillo resigned on October 31, 2011. Chuck Armstrong was named interim program director in November 2011. Craig Schwalb was named program director in January 2014.

From its first day as a news/talk station until the end of 2014, WABC aired top-of-the-hour news from ABC News Radio. For the next five years after that, WABC affiliated with Westwood One News for hourly headlines, after which it joined Fox News Radio.

== See also ==
- List of initial AM-band station grants in the United States
