= Radio Hall of Fame =

American organization

Coordinates: 41.88335°N 87.62513°W

The Radio Hall of Fame, formerly the National Radio Hall of Fame, is an American organization created by the Emerson Radio Corporation in 1988.

Three years later, Bruce DuMont, founder, president, and CEO of the Museum of Broadcast Communications, assumed control of the Hall, moved its base of operations to Chicago, and incorporated it into the MBC. It has been described as being dedicated to recognizing those who have contributed to the development of the radio medium throughout its history in the United States. The NRHOF gallery was located on the second floor of the MBC, at 360 N. State Street, from December 2011 until October 2017, when the traveling exhibit "Saturday Night Live: The Experience" was installed on the second and fourth floors. In September 2018 the MBC's board of directors was reportedly close to finalizing a deal to sell the museum's third and fourth floors to Fern Hill, a real estate development and investment firm, according to Chicago media blogger Robert Feder, which would leave the MBC with just the second floor for exhibit space. After "Saturday Night Live: The Experience" closed on March 31, 2019, the NRHOF gallery was partially restored on the second floor.

== Selection process ==
Inductees to the Radio Hall of Fame are nominated by a 24-person Nominating Committee composed of industry programming leaders and executives, industry observers and members of academia. The Nominating Committee is inclusive of commercial and public radio. Nominating Committee members serve two or three year terms on a volunteer basis. The committee receives suggestions from the industry and listening public before convening and presenting a slate of 24 nominees, 16 of which are voted upon by an industry-wide Voting Participant panel while eight others are voted on by the public. The Nominating Committee subsequently chooses up to four additional individuals for induction, choosing from suggested air personalities, programmers, management or ownership.

Voting was open to the public from 2008 to 2010, then closed to public ballots from 2011 to 2014. Public voting resumed in 2015 and continues today.

== Nomination criteria ==
The Nominating Committee recommends nominations in the following categories:

- Longstanding Local/Regional (20 years or more);
- Active Local/Regional (10 years or more);
- Longstanding Network/Syndication (20 years or more);
- Active Network/Syndication (10 years or more);
- Music Format On-Air Personality;
- Spoken Word On-Air Personality

== Controversies ==
The online public selection of Focus on the Family's radio program for induction in the NRHOF caused gay-rights activists to protest the induction ceremony in Chicago on November 8, 2008.

"Since 2011 the public has been shut out of the Radio Hall of Fame voting process despite requirements that the steering committee consider recommendations from the public, announce multiple nominees in four categories, and conduct public voting online. Instead, the steering committee announced each year's inductees as a fait accompli," wrote Robert Feder in June 2015 as NRHOF chairman Kraig Kitchin announced the return of public voting. In 2011, the NRHOF made headlines by inducting former U.S. president Ronald Reagan, "whose radio career spanned only five years as a sportscaster in Iowa in the 1930s," Feder reported, although Reagan also appeared on radio programs as an actor and gave a weekly radio address as president, a tradition continued by his successors.

An August 2016 article posted on the website Chicagoland Radio and Media that centered on further controversies surrounding Bruce DuMont's personal life and his presidency of the Museum of Broadcast Communications stated that he "finally succumbed to pressure" when he stepped down as the NRHOF's chairman in 2014.

Howard Stern, one of the most highly rated and visible figures in radio since the 1980s, has been vocally critical of the NRHOF. He has regularly made it a focus of his jokes, lampooning the fact that the entire nomination and selection process appeared to be controlled by Bruce DuMont, the sole authority appointing the panel for the selection process. Stern has stated he would reject any offer to join the NRHOF, and further said, "There is no Radio Hall of Fame. It's just a guy in his basement giving out awards. His name is Bruce DuMont, and he has nothing to do with radio other than the fact that his family made radios years ago." On June 28, 2012, Robert Feder reported that the "most conspicuous and embarrassing omission to the Radio Hall of Fame finally will be corrected this fall when Howard Stern is inducted."

== Inductees ==
Current members of the Radio Hall of Fame, including eight in the Class of 2023.

=== Individuals and Duos ===
- Abbott and Costello
- Goodman Ace and Jane Ace
- José Miguel Agrelot
- Raul Alarcón Sr.
- Kurt Alexander
- Fred Allen
- Mel Allen
- Don Ameche
- Eddie Anderson
- Eve Arden
- Edwin Howard Armstrong
- Jackson Armstrong
- Gene Autry
- Red Barber
- Tom Barnard
- Dick Bartley
- George G. Beasley
- Glenn Beck
- Art Bell
- Jack Benny
- Gertrude Berg
- Edgar Bergen
- Dick Biondi
- Jesse B. Blayton Sr.
- Martin Block
- Bob and Ray
- Jim Bohannon
- Bobby Bones
- Neal Boortz
- Amar Bose
- Jonathon Brandmeier
- Marty Brennaman
- Jack Brickhouse
- Brother Wease
- Himan Brown
- Joy Browne
- Jack Buck
- Gary Burbank
- Burns and Allen
- Jess Cain
- Sway Calloway
- Eddie Cantor
- Harry Caray
- Jack Carney
- Howie Carr
- Andrew Carter
- Ron Chapman
- Charlie & Harrigan
- Dick Clark
- Jerry Coleman
- Bob Collins
- Ann Compton
- William Conrad
- Jack L. Cooper
- Myron Cope
- Don Cornelius
- Charles Correll
- Norman Corwin
- Lou Costello
- Frankie Crocker
- Bing Crosby
- Powel Crosley Jr.
- Steve Dahl
- Yvonne Daniels
- John DeBella
- Lee de Forest
- Rick Dees
- Delilah
- Dr. Demento
- Tom Donahue
- Nanci Donnellan
  (The Fabulous Sports Babe)
- Tommy Dorsey
- Bill Drake
- Jim Dunbar
- Don Dunphy
- Elvis Duran
- Jimmy Durante
- Richard Durham
- Marv Dyson
- Boomer Esiason
- Bob Edwards
- Douglas Edwards
- Ralph Edwards
- Ralph Emery
- Barry Farber
- Erica Farber
- Joseph Field
- Fred Foy
- Mike Francesa
- Arlene Francis
- Stan Freberg
- Alan Freed
- John A. Gambling
- Blair Garner
- Ira Glass
- Christopher Glenn
- Arthur Godfrey
- Leonard Goldenson
- Benny Goodman
- Gale Gordon
- Freeman Gosden
- Toni Grant
- Barry Gray
- Petey Greene
- Terry Gross
- Ralph Guild
- Karl Haas
- Joan Hamburg
- Milo Hamilton
- Sean "Hollywood" Hamilton
- Bill Handel
- Sean Hannity
- John Hare
- Harry Harrison
- Lynne "Angel" Harvey
- Paul Harvey
- Paul Harvey Jr.
- Steve Harvey
- Ernie Harwell
- Lon Helton
- Terri Hemmert
- Jocko Henderson
- Phil Hendrie
- Gordon Hinkley
- Bob Hope
- Gerry House
- Clark Howard
- Stanley E. Hubbard
- Cathy Hughes
- Maurice "Hot Rod" Hulbert
- Don Imus
- Dan Ingram
- Hal Jackson
- Michael Jackson
- Fred Jacobs
- E. Rodney Jones
- Jim Jordan
- Marian Driscoll Jordan
- Tom Joyner
- Ellen K
- Harry Kalas
- H. V. Kaltenborn
- Mel Karmazin
- Carl Kasell
- Casey Kasem
- Murray "the K" Kaufman
- Garrison Keillor
- Kid Kelly
- Herb Kent
- Jim Kerr
- Larry King
- Bob Kingsley
- Kim Komando
- Kidd Kraddick
- Kay Kyser
- Art Laboe
- John Records Landecker
- John Lanigan
- Broadway Bill Lee
- Chuck Leonard
- Mark Levin
- Hal Lewis
- Rush Limbaugh
- Melvin Lindsey
- Walt "Baby" Love
- Michael “Mickey” Luckoff
- Larry Lujack
- Ron Lundy
- Joe Madison
- Ray Magliozzi
- Tom Magliozzi
- Guglielmo Marconi
- Angie Martinez
- Groucho Marx
- Luther Masingill
- Dan Mason
- Lowry Mays
- Mary Margaret McBride
- J. P. McCarthy
- Edward F. McLaughlin
- Gordon McLendon
- Graham McNamee
- Marian McPartland
- Garry Meier
- Ruth Ann Meyer
- Carol Miller
- Jon Miller
- Agnes Moorehead
- Robert W. Morgan
- "Cousin Brucie" Morrow
- Scott Muni
- Edward R. Murrow
- Manuel "Paco" Navarro
- Pat O'Day
- Eddie O'Jay
- Stu Olds
- Dick Orkin
- Charles Osgood
- Gary Owens
- Ronn Owens
- William S. Paley
- Deborah Parenti
- Edward Pate Jr.
- Dan Patrick
- Norman Pattiz
- Virginia Payne
- Sam Phillips
- Wally Phillips
- Dick Purtan
- James Henry Quello
- Robin Quivers
- Dave Ramsey
- Ronald Reagan
- Bob Rivers
- Cokie Roberts
- Tony Roberts
- Neil Rogers
- Jim Rome
- Javier Romero
- Franklin D. Roosevelt
- Chris "Mad Dog" Russo
- Pat St. John
- Orion Samuelson
- David Sarnoff
- Michael Savage
- Chuck Schaden
- Laura Schlessinger
- Vin Scully
- Ryan Seacrest
- Elliot Segal
- Scott Shannon
- Jean Shepherd
- Bill Siemering
- Robert Sievers
- Donnie Simpson
- Red Skelton
- Rick Sklar
- Kate Smith
- Paul W. Smith
- Jeff Smulyan
- Eddie "Piolín" Sotelo
- Susan Stamberg
- Frank Stanton
- Alison Steele
- Bob Steele
- Don Steele
- Martha Jean Steinberg
- Charley Steiner
- Bill Stern
- Howard Stern
- Shadoe Stevens
- Todd Storz
- Fran Striker
- Studs Terkel
- John Tesh
- Jay Thomas
- Lowell Thomas
- Rufus Thomas
- Mac Tichenor
- Nina Totenberg
- Les Tremayne
- Charlie Tuna
- Bob Uecker
- Suzyn Waldman
- Ed Walker
- Charles Warfield
- Orson Welles
- Ruth Westheimer
- Dick Whittinghill
- Bruce Williams
- Nat D. Williams
- Jerry Williams
- Wendy Williams
- William B. Williams
- Walter Winchell
- Wolfman Jack

=== Programs ===
- All Things Considered
- Amos 'n' Andy
- The Bob & Tom Show
- The Breakfast Club
- Can You Top This?
- Car Talk
- CBS Radio Mystery Theater
- CBS World News Roundup
- The Charlie McCarthy Show
- Don McNeill's Breakfast Club
- Easy Aces
- The Eric & Kathy Show
- Fibber McGee and Molly
- Focus on the Family
- Fresh Air
- Gang Busters
- The Goldbergs
- Grand Ole Opry
- The Great Gildersleeve
- Inner Sanctum Mystery
- Jack Armstrong
- The Jef & Jer Showgram
- Kevin & Bean
- Little Orphan Annie
- The Lone Ranger
- Lux Radio Theatre
- Ma Perkins
- The March of Time
- The Mark & Brian Show
- The Mercury Theatre on the Air
- Mike & Mike
- Music & the Spoken Word
- National Barn Dance
- One Man's Family
- Preston & Steve
- The Romance of Helen Trent
- The Shadow
- Suspense
- Take It or Leave It
- You Bet Your Life
- Your Hit Parade

== See also ==
- NAB Broadcasting Hall of Fame
- American Museum of Radio and Electricity
- Museum of Radio and Technology
