= Dan Daniel (radio personality) =

American radio presenter

Dandy Dan Daniel
- Broadcasting as a Good Guy at WMCA
- Born: Vergil Glynn Daniel; December 18, 1934; Buffalo, Texas, US
- Died: June 21, 2016 (aged 81); Larchmont, New York, US
- Years active: 1951–2002
- Employer(s): Armed Forces Radio, KXYZ, WDGY, WMCA, NBC, WHN, WYNY-FM ABC, CBS
- Known for: Radio and TV presenting
- Spouse: Rosemary Bialon (m. 1959)
- Children: 3

Vergil Glynn "Dan" Daniel (December 18, 1934 – June 21, 2016) was an American radio disc jockey, known on the air as Dandy Dan Daniel and Triple-D.

== Career ==
Daniel started as a disc jockey at age seventeen on Armed Forces Radio with the US Navy. His first commercial job was at KXYZ in Houston in 1955 and he then worked at WDGY in Minneapolis before moving to WMCA in 1961.

His first broadcast at WMCA was on August 18, 1961. He started on the graveyard shift overnight but from 1962 to 1968 he played the top 40 hits from 4 pm to 7 pm — the evening drive home slot. The station produced a survey of the current sales in New York record stores and Dandy Dan gave the countdown of the week's best sellers every Wednesday in this late afternoon slot. In 1966, he participated in a tour of Africa to celebrate the fifth anniversary of the Peace Corps. Then, from 1968 to 1970, he did the early morning drive-to-work slot before leaving WMCA after nearly nine years; his final broadcast was on July 11, 1970.

Daniel was heard coast-to-coast on NBC Radio's Monitor in the summer of 1973 and was the announcer on the 1974–1975 game show The Big Showdown. He subsequently worked on WYNY-FM where he hosted the mid-day slot and later morning and afternoon drives. He then did a stint at WHN playing country music before returning to WYNY-FM. Finally, he moved to WCBS-FM in 1996. He retired from WCBS on December 31, 2002.

== Style ==
Daniel was one of the personalities promoted as the "Good Guys" while working for the New York Top 40 radio station WMCA in the 1960s, when bands like The Beatles were transforming the music scene. He performed too and was the first to record the song "Is That All There Is?" He was tall –6 ft 5 in (1.96 m)— and so his theme tune was "Big Boss Man", as performed by Charlie Rich. One of his catchphrases was "I love you ... and especially you, size nine." "Size nine" was once revealed to be his wife, Rosemary.

One technique used by Daniel was to research his audience. He felt that it was important to communicate in a personal way with them:

A deejay can be excited, use sound effects, voices, whatever. But when you talk to people, you've got to relate to them ... I make it a point to spend time with the average type of people to learn more about them ... to improve myself.

— Dan Daniel

== Death ==
Daniel died on June 21, 2016, after falling in his home the previous day. He was 81.

== See also ==
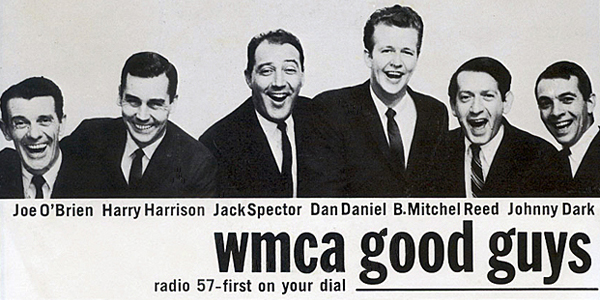

- Harry Harrison — another 'Good Guy'
- Jack Spector — another 'Good Guy'
