= Rick Sklar =

American radio producer

- Born: November 21, 1929
- Died: June 22, 1992 (aged 62); Roosevelt Hospital, Manhattan
- Occupations: radio programmer and consultant

Rick Sklar (November 21, 1929 – June 22, 1992) was an American radio program director who, while at New York City's WABC, was one of the originators of the Top 40 radio format.

== Biography ==
Sklar grew up in Brighton Beach, Brooklyn. He graduated from New York University and volunteered at WNYC radio as a writer. He then worked at WPAC in Patchogue, New York, and in 1954 moved to WINS where he was assistant program director. In 1960, Sklar became program director at crosstown competitor WMGM.

He moved to WABC in 1962 and became program director there in 1963. Under his management, WABC became the model for tight-playlist, teenager-targeted Top 40 programming, with a strong signal and famed disc jockeys such as "Cousin Brucie" Bruce Morrow, Dan Ingram, Harry Harrison, Chuck Leonard, and Ron Lundy. His relationship with some of the DJs he oversaw was contentious at times. Scott Muni departed from WABC after a number of confrontations with Sklar over playlists including Sklar's refusal to remove Louis Armstrong's version of the #1 smash hit "Hello, Dolly" from the playlist at Muni's request. Under Sklar, the station's ratings soared and was often the most listened to radio station in North America through the mid-60s into the late 70s.

In March 1977, Sklar was promoted to vice president of programming for ABC’s radio division. In 1984 he left ABC to start his own consulting firm, Sklar Communications. His autobiography, Rocking America: An Insider's Story: How the All-Hit Radio Stations Took Over America (ISBN 978-0312687977), was published by St. Martin's Press the same year.

In an interview recorded in 1982, when WABC switched from music to talk programming, Sklar said:

Everything has to end, that's life, WABC is … like anything else it's part of life, couldn't go on forever. But … it was a wonderful thing … it was a one-of-a-kind … I don't think there'll ever be another station quite like that. I mean, the scope of the thing was so huge, was so grand; everything that was done was on such a massive scale. We gave out buttons, we gave out 14 million with the WABC call letters and if we spot you we'll give you $25,000. You know, this stuff is … it's just not done today.… We'll miss it.

Radio will go on and on forever. Radio's the most adaptable medium there is, and … the old WABC's place in radio will be remembered by everyone who ever heard it, who ever grew up with it, it'll be part of millions and millions—tens of millions of people's lives, and certainly the lives of everyone in the radio business. Now we just have to go on to new things, and I think we will.

Sklar continued to write articles and books as well as visiting various colleges discussing the business of radio in general. He was also an adjunct professor at St. John's University.

== Personal life and death ==
Rick was married to the former Sydelle Helfgott, who also served as vice president for his company, Sklar Communications. They had two children: a son Scott and a daughter Holly and three grandchildren: Emily, Samantha and Jacob.

Prior to his death, Sklar had been an avid runner for more than ten years, taking it up in the late 1970s. He ran his first New York City Marathon in 1982, finishing 4 hours, 21 minutes, and 36 seconds; coming in 642nd out of 857 who finished the race in his age group. He began to have problems with his left foot, which necessitated him quitting the sport by 1990.

In June 1992, he entered Roosevelt Hospital in Manhattan for a minor operation that would allow him to run again. Although in good health, he died on the operating table due to a lack of oxygen and other mistakes made by the hospital staff.

== Legacy ==
Sydelle Sklar died on November 21, 1992, of cancer. Rick Sklar was posthumously inducted into the National Radio Hall of Fame the following year.
