= The Big Showdown =

- Genre: Game show
- Directed by: Dick Schneider
- Presented by: Jim Peck
- Announcer: Dan Daniel
- Theme music composer: Score Productions
- Country of origin: United States
- No. of episodes: 140

Production
- Executive producers: Don Lipp; Ron Greenberg
- Producer: Shelley Dobbins
- Running time: 30 minutes
- Production companies: Don Lipp Productions; Ron Greenberg Productions; MCA TV Ltd.

Original release
- Network: ABC
- Release: December 23, 1974 – July 4, 1975

The Big Showdown is an American game show that aired on the ABC television network from December 23, 1974 to July 4, 1975. Jim Peck (in his national television debut) hosted the program and Dan Daniel (then a disc jockey on New York City's WHN) served as announcer.

The series was recorded at ABC's New York studio TV15 on West 58 Street, and packaged by Don Lipp’s Daphne Productions and Ron Greenberg, with assistance by MCA Television.

== Gameplay ==
=== The Big Showdown ===
Three contestants competed. Before the round began, Peck announced a target score or "payoff point," and selected a dollar value for it by pressing a buzzer on his podium to stop a randomizer ($25, $50, $75, $100, or $500). He then read a one-point toss-up question. The first contestant to buzz-in and correctly answer it chose from one of six available categories, each with a different point value from 1 to 6 as represented by faces of a die. A correct answer to a question awarded the points for the chosen category and allowed the contestant to select the next one. A miss locked the contestant out of that question and gave the opponents a chance to answer. The payoff point had to be reached exactly, and contestants were not allowed to select or answer any question that would put them over that total, being automatically locked out in the latter case. The first contestant to reach the payoff point won the money associated with it. A new dollar value and payoff point were set, the latter raised by several points above the previous one, and Peck asked a one-point toss-up to award control of the board. A toss-up was also asked whenever all players missed a question.

A new set of categories was introduced after the second payoff point had been reached. Four or more payoff points were played during this round, depending on the speed with which the game progressed.

At the sound of a bell, a 90-second speed round was played under the same rules. The current payoff point (if any) was played for its set value, after which all others were worth $100. Once time ran out, the two highest scorers advanced to the Final Showdown. The lowest scorer was eliminated and kept his/her money, or received consolation prizes if he/she had not hit any payoff points.

In the event of a tie, Peck asked questions from the one-point category to the tied contestants until the deadlock was broken. Answering correctly allowed the contestant to advance, while an incorrect answer eliminated the contestant.

=== Final Showdown ===
The two remaining contestants competed to reach a payoff point of seven. Three categories were played, again represented by faces on a die, and point values were 1, 2, and 3 respectively. The scores were reset to zero, and the contestant who had been in the lead at the end of the Big Showdown chose the first category. As before, no contestant could choose or answer a question that would put him/her above the payoff point. If both contestants missed a question, a one-point toss-up was asked for control of the board. The first contestant to reach seven points won the game and an additional $250; both contestants kept any money they had accumulated during the game. The runner-up also received consolation prizes.

=== Bonus Round ===
The champion had a chance to win up to $10,000 by rolling oversized dice. Model Heather Cunningham joined the proceedings to hand the dice to the champion. The sixes on each pair had been replaced with the words "Show" and "Down", and the goal was to have both words appear in a single roll. The champion was given one free roll at the outset, which awarded $10,000 and ended the round immediately if "Show-Down" came up.

If the champion rolled any other combination, that total became his/her payoff point for the round. Since "Show" and "Down" had no value individually, payoff points could range from 1 to 10. The champion was then given 30 seconds to make as many rolls as possible, with Cunningham providing a new pair of dice each time and Peck removing completed rolls and calling out results, and each payoff point roll would be worth $250. Both dice had to land in a well at the table end opposite the champion in order to count. Rolling "Show-Down" here ended the round and won the champion $5,000 in addition to any money won from rolling payoff points.

If the thirty seconds had elapsed without a "Show-Down" roll and the champion had rolled the payoff point at least once, he/she was given one last chance to win the $5,000. For each time the payoff point had been rolled, five seconds of extra time were given to the champion to roll "Show-Down".

Any champion that rolled "Show-Down" during their bonus round retired from the show undefeated. Otherwise, champions played until they either lost in the front game or reached ABC's winnings limit, which at the time was $20,000.

== Episode status ==
The series is believed to have been wiped due to network practices of the era. An audio clip of the opening to one episode also exists, as well as audio of the complete series finale. As of September 29, 2025, three episodes also exist on videotape: the 1974 pilot, an episode from March 1975 where Jim Peck falls while making his entrance down the stairs (which has made an appearance on The Most Outrageous Game Show Moments and also features a $5,000 Showdown win), and the third-to-last episode from July 2, 1975.
