= Change of Heart (TV series) =

- Genre: Reality Television
- Written by: Brian Michael Tracy
- Directed by: Richard Brian DiPirro; David Wexler
- Presented by: Chris Jagger (1998–2001; 2002–03); Lynne Koplitz (2001–02)
- Country of origin: United States
- Original language: English

Production
- Production companies: Dawn Syndicated Productions; Divine Hammer Productions; Telepictures Productions

Original release
- Network: Syndicated
- Release: September 21, 1998 – May 21, 2003

Change of Heart is a dating game show that was hosted by Chris Jagger (1998–2001; 2002–03) then Lynne Koplitz (2001–02) and syndicated by Warner Bros. Television Distribution (via its Telepictures unit). During the 1998-2001 season, Ryan Seacrest would also serve as a fill-in host during some episodes with Phil Kollin doing the same during the 2001–02 season. Koplitz was not asked back for the 2002–03 season due to an undisclosed financial issue.

The series was featured in a 1999 episode of The Jamie Foxx Show, while rapper The Game also made an appearance the next year.

The show was originally taped in Los Angeles for its first three seasons, and then moved to New York City in 2001, where it would remain for the last two. During season 1, Change of Heart was once paired in most markets with a revival of Love Connection hosted by Pat Bullard in 1998, which was cancelled after one season. From 2000 to 2003, the series was also paired in some markets with another game show, Street Smarts hosted by Frank Nicotero.

The premise of the show involved dating couples who are matched up with other singles and then sent out on respective dates. During the taping, they discuss their relationship, then their new dating experience. At the end of show the couples have to decide if they want to "Stay Together", or if they've had a "Change Of Heart".

== See also ==
- Love Phones, also hosted by Chris Jagger
