= Chuck Leonard =

American radio personality

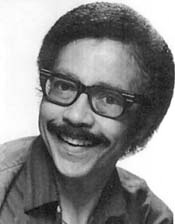
- Leonard in the 1970s
- Born: Charles Wesley Leonard; March 30, 1937; Chicago, Illinois
- Died: August 12, 2004 (aged 67); New York, New York
- Presenting career
- Country: United States

Charles Wesley Leonard (March 30, 1937, in Chicago, Illinois – August 12, 2004, in New York, New York) was an American radio personality at WABC (AM) in New York City during the 1960s and 1970s. His deep voice and smoothness resonated across 38 states for 14 years at ABC. During his over 40-year career in broadcasting, Leonard worked virtually every shift and played all styles of music at stations including WWRL, WABC, WXLO, WRKS, WBLS, WQEW, WNSW-AM and WJUX. He has been inducted in the Museum of Television & Radio and is known as the first African-American disc jockey to work on a mainstream radio station.

== College radio ==
Leonard began his broadcasting career at the University of Illinois at Urbana-Champaign, as program director of college radio WPGU, while majoring in journalism.

== Newspaper experience ==
After graduation, Leonard worked briefly for the Washington Evening Star (his boss was Carl Bernstein), while working part-time at WEBB, Baltimore.

== Radio career ==
=== WWRL, New York, April–June 1965 ===
Leonard moved to WWRL (R&B) in New York in June 1965, doing the night shift. Leonard was at WWRL for just seven weeks, before WABC (AM) deejay Dan Ingram heard him and convinced WABC to hire him. He was the first African-American broadcast personality on a major market Top 40 station.

=== WABC (AM) Radio, New York, 1965-1979 ===
Leonard began at ABC's flagship New York radio station, Musicradio 77 WABC (AM), under program director Rick Sklar in 1965. He broke the color barrier for all who followed — the first African-American to cross over from black R&B radio to (then-mostly white) mass-appeal radio.

Leonard began in the 11 p.m. to midnight slot, and continued working late nights and Sundays at the station until November 27, 1979. He did the 10:30 p.m. to 1:00 a.m. shift following “Cousin” Bruce Morrow and later George Michael. He also gladly handled weekend and fill-in work.

Leonard was the host of "Sneak Preview," a five-minute Monday-through-Saturday evening program on ABC's American Contemporary Radio Network, which featured newly released songs. He stayed at WABC until 1979, before moving to WXLO and WRKS.

=== WXLO-FM, New York, 1980-1981 ===
Leonard moved to WXLO on May 12, 1980.

=== WRKS-FM (98.7 KISS-FM), New York, 1981-1989 ===
Leonard did mornings ("The Wake-up Club”) and afternoons in the 1980s.

=== WBLS-FM, New York, June 30, 1989-1994 ===
Leonard played R&B from 7–11 p.m. He always kept ties with WBLS, working weekends, fill-ins and overnights.

=== WQEW-AM, New York, 1996-1998 ===
Leonard played popular standards from the American songbook prior to the station flipping to Radio Disney.

=== WNSW-AM 1430, New York ===
WNSW was on the air for only two years (March 22, 1999 to March 1, 2001), offering popular standards.

=== WJUX-FM 103.1 “Jukebox Radio” ===
Leonard did afternoon drive.

=== WCBS-FM, New York ===
For WCBS-FM, Leonard did occasional fill in work, including on Christmas Day. He was heard on the Radio Greats weekends. He did not work full-time at WCBS-FM because he was a full-time employee for WBLS. CBS-FM welcomed Leonard to fill in any time he could.

=== Sirius Satellite Radio ===
Leonard joined Sirius Satellite Radio, where he was heard on both the Swing Street and Soul Review channels.

== Personal life ==
Leonard was a Golden Gloves boxing champion. Leonard served in the Vietnam War.

Leonard died on August 12, 2004, in Manhattan, following lung cancer. He was 67. He is survived by his wife, Pam, and two daughters, Kyra and Diana.
