= Irv Gikofsky =

American television meteorologist

- Born: May 10, 1945 (age 81); Brooklyn, New York City, United States
- Education: Hofstra University (BA); Yeshiva University (MA)
- Occupation: Television meteorologist
- Years active: 1977–present
- Employer: WPIX
- Known for: Weather forecasting on WPIX
- Awards: Emmy Awards (5) Edward R. Murrow Award Friars Club Lifetime Achievement Award

Irv Gikofsky (born May 10, 1945), known professionally as Mr. G, is an American television meteorologist who currently serves as the weatherman for WPIX serving New York City and the surrounding regions.

== Biography ==
Born in Brooklyn, New York, and raised in Queens, he graduated from Hofstra University with a Bachelor of Arts degree in History in 1967. He then attended Yeshiva University, where he received a Master of Arts degree in Secondary Education and pursued doctoral studies. Shortly after graduating, he began his career as a school teacher at Albert Einstein Intermediate School in the Bronx. During his tenure there, he was notable for creating the first computerized weather program for use by New York City's school system.

== Meteorological career ==
Gikofsky served as a weatherman for both WCBS-TV and WCBS-FM in New York City starting in 1977. In 1993, he left WCBS-TV to become the weekday weatherman at local competitor WPIX in New York, while continuing his role at WCBS-FM radio. He retired from WCBS-FM in 2014, and remains on staff at WPIX.

For his work as a television meteorologist, he has won five Emmy Awards and an Edward R. Murrow Award. In 2008, he was presented the Friar’s Club Lifetime Achievement Award. During his tenure, WPIX11 has been named Best Newscast by numerous media outlets, including the New York State Associated Press Broadcasters Association and the New York Press Club.

He has given motivational speeches at over 500 schools around New York City and has participated in New York City’s “Principal for a Day” program every year since its inception. On January 28, 2016, then-Bronx Borough President Ruben Diaz Jr. proclaimed January 28 to be "Mr. G Day" in honor of his work in the community and his famous media presence. He also serves as board member for the R Baby Foundation, which works to improve pediatric care in emergency rooms in the New York metropolitan area.

On August 1, 2023, the New York State Broadcasters Association, Inc., announced that Mr. G would be inducted into the New York State Broadcasters Hall of Fame. The induction ceremony took place at the group’s annual luncheon in the Rainbow Room, 30 Rockefeller Plaza, New York City on October 26, 2023.
