= Johnny Donovan =

American DJ

Johnny Donovan is an American radio announcer and former producer at New York's WABC (AM).

He grew up in Poughkeepsie, New York, nicknamed "Sarge," after his father's rank in the United States Army during World War II. A radio enthusiast from an early age (with an amateur radio station K2KOQ in a corner of the basement), he became a DJ ("Large Sarge") on WHVW in nearby Hyde Park, after helping build the station. He went on to stations in Kingston (WBAZ) and Binghamton (WENE), New York and Atlantic City, New Jersey (WMID) before landing in New York City, first at WOR-FM, and finally at WABC (at the time the "Holy Grail" for DJs), where he preceded Dan Ingram on the air.

Donovan stayed on at WABC as Production Director and chief staff announcer when WABC went to a talk format in 1982.

With the assistance of Peter Kanze, Rob Frankel and Allan Sniffen, he produced the now defunct WABC Rewound program each Memorial Day.

In May 2015 he retired from WABC after 43 years. He remained the "voice" of Rush Limbaugh's syndicated show, for which WABC was the flagship station from 1988 until the end of 2013, since then airing on WOR.
