= Love Phones =

Radio show

Love Phones was a popular call-in radio show which was launched by Malrite Communications on Z-100 in New York City and Eagle 106 WEGX in Philadelphia in 1992. Love Phones ran from November 1992 until 1998. Love Phones was syndicated on other stations beginning in 1994. Eagle 106 signed off the air in Philadelphia in early 1993. The next station to pick up Love Phones would be in Cleveland in 1994. Listeners would call in asking for advice related to their love or sex life.

Love Phones was hosted by Dr.Judy Kuriansky and, until 1993, by Chio the Hitman followed by Chris Jagger. Love Phones was heard from 10 pm to 12 am EST, usually on rock or alternative radio stations. The show also had celebrity guests. One of the most memorable moments on the show was when a young female caller asked Dr. Judy how to give a blow job. Dr. Judy explained that "blow job" is a misnomer, so the caller immediately asked how to give a misnomer.

In 1996, when Z-100 in New York was purchased by Chancellor Broadcasting they decided to drop Love Phones for a music intensive night show instead, titled "The Chat Room." Love Phones lost many of their affiliates as a result. The show would survive in different forms over the next few years, before ending in 1998.

== See also ==
- Change of Heart (TV series), also hosted by Chris Jagger
