= Judy Kuriansky =

Judy Kuriansky, known as Dr. Judy, is an American clinical psychologist, journalist, author, and former radio host. She was the host of the popular 1990s call-in show Love Phones.

In 2014, Kuriansky donated $50,000 to the American Psychological Foundation, establishing the Dr. Judy Kuriansky Graduate Scholarship.

== Books ==
- Generation Sex: America's Hottest Sex Therapist Answers the Hottest Questions About Sex (HarperCollins, 1995)
- The Complete Idiots Guide to Dating (MacMillan, 1996)
- The Complete Idiots Guide to A Healthy Relationship (Alpha Books, 1998)
- The Complete Idiots Guide to Tantric Sex (Alpha Books, 2001)
- Terror in the Holy Land: Inside the Anguish of the Israeli-Palestinian Conflict (Praeger Publishers, 2006)
- Beyond Bullets and Bombs: Grassroots Peacebuilding between Israelis and Palestinians (Praeger Publishers, 2007)
