= Bob Shannon (radio personality) =

American radio personality (1948–2023)

- Born: Don Bombard; December 16, 1948; Syracuse, New York, U.S.
- Died: June 28, 2023 (aged 74)
- Spouse: Connie Frances
- Children: 2
- Presenting career
- Country: United States

Don Bombard (December 16, 1948 – June 28, 2023), known professionally as Bob Shannon, was an American radio disc jockey best known for his work on WCBS-FM in New York City. He also co-wrote (with John Javna) the book Behind The Hits: Inside Stories of Classic Pop and Rock and Roll.

== Early life and career ==
Don Bombard was first introduced on radio by future sportscaster Marv Albert, then a disc jockey on WOLF (AM), in May 1962 as the winner of a guest deejay contest while still a junior high school student over in his hometown of Syracuse, New York.

At age 15, Bombard experimented with broadcasting from his home, using a radio that had the wiring reversed to become a transmitter. The radio's antenna was hooked to a radiator, utilizing the water pipes to get the signal out to his neighborhood. In high school he partnered with Jody Carmen and Mel Cowznofski in the Big 50 Hits of the Week Survey, which was printed and distributed in Syracuse, New York to local record stores.

Bombard joined the staff of Syracuse University station WAER-FM as a freshman in 1965.

Bombard came to the attention of the local Syracuse Top 40 stations WNDR and WOLF when, as a teenager, he compiled and distributed his own weekly music survey known as The Big 50.

Bombard then went on to work at both stations from 1967 to 1977, where he gained experience as an announcer, music director, and programmer. He joined WNDR in 1967 as a part-time weekend DJ. In 1968, he accepted an offer by WOLF to work full-time on their night show. He became the station's music director and started an all-request show. In 1969, he was part of the team that returned WOLF to a Top 40 format and remained as music director and night DJ until the following year, when he was hired back full-time at WNDR.

There, he hosted a late-night "Attitude Hours" progressive rock show. Later he became assistant program director and afternoon drive DJ, as well as taking over the reins of the "Saturday Night of Gold" oldies show.

In 1975, he left radio briefly to run "Don Bombard Disco," a company formed with partner Guy Capone. He returned to WOLF the following year and became program director.

While in Syracuse, Bombard collaborated with local music historian Ron Wray (aka Ron Gersbacher) on a documentary history of WOLF ("The WOLF Story") and a series of "History of Syracuse Music" albums. He also formed (with Wray) Piece Records.

== Move to Pittsburgh ==
In 1977, Bombard moved to Pittsburgh to work at station 13Q (WKTQ). He began as production director and then moved to afternoon drive dj. He originated and hosted “The Sunday Night Oldies Party”. Bombard also released (with record collector Frank DeMino) a compilation album called "The Pittsburgh Hall of Fame". He also did booth announcing for WIIC (now WPXI) television.

== Arrival at WCBS-FM ==
In late 1981 Bombard moved to New York City to work part-time at a recording studio owned by Wendell Craig, formerly dj Windy Craig at WOLF. While there, with Craig's blessings, he launched a radio syndication company called Sirius Productions. Bombard then began as a fill-in announcer at WYNY (now WQHT). Shortly after, he would leave WYNY for WCBS-FM and began doing some booth announcing for WOR-TV. He used his given name on WYNY, but at CBS-FM (which already had Don K. Reed) his on-air name was changed to Bobby Shannon by program director Joe McCoy. Gradually, his air name evolved to Bob Shannon, and sometimes Bob "101" Shannon, using the radio station's frequency.

Shannon launched a weekend overnight spin-off of his Pittsburgh show on WCBS-FM called "The Oldies Party" and continued to tape a weekly Sunday night show for airing in Pittsburgh. He also briefly hosted the Saturday night show vacated by Jack Spector. In 1982, he was promoted to the full-time 6-10PM shift and originated (with music director Richard Lorenzo) a nightly "Hall of Fame" segment. This segment played "wall-to-wall" music from 9 p.m. to 10 p.m. by a selected artist or a couple artists (if the artists each had only a few big hits). For bigger artists with many hits, the hall of fame feature sometimes began at 8 p.m. In 1986, with the exit of Dick Heatherton, he took over the afternoon drive time slot, where he remained until the station's two-year "sabbatical" that began in 2005. The Hall Of Fame was revamped in evenings to feature several to half a dozen songs an hour by a selected artists mixed in with other regularly played music. Bobby Jay took over except on Wednesdays. On Wednesday, Cousin Bruce Morrow took over. At that point, on Thursdays the Hall Of Fame was strictly 60s music and on Fridays strictly 50s.

At WCBS-FM, on the 3 p.m. to 7 p.m. timeslot, he programmed music features such as "Rockeology", "Hands Across the Water", "First and Foremost", "lost hits", "songs with the same title but are different", "Wednesday Fourplay/Three For The Road", and others. In 1986 he collected his interviews with music acts into a book, "Behind The Hits: Inside Stories of Classic Pop and Rock and Roll", co-authored with John Javna.

Shannon hosted a number of nationally syndicated radio shows, including "The Oldies Countdown" for MJI Broadcasting and "Keeping The '70s Alive" and "Behind The Hits" for On The Radio Broadcasting. He co-hosted, with WCBS-FM's Bobby Jay, live broadcasts for Westwood One from the Rock and Roll Hall of Fame induction ceremonies in New York.

On June 3, 2005, WCBS-FM switched to an "Adult Hits" format called Jack FM which used no live DJs. Shannon began a weekly show with his wife, Connie T. Empress, on WLNG, Long Island, NY. He also hosted a weekly Internet program, “Behind the Hits”, on Vip radio in Europe. He also broadcast weekly internet radio shows at RadioMaxMusic, and was instrumental in the creation of the Across The Tracks format used there. He worked briefly at New Jersey's "The Breeze" WWZY/WBHX in 2007, and took part in the station's Radio Greats Weekend in July 2007 after his return to WCBS-FM.

== CBS-FM Returns ==
When WCBS-FM came back to New York radio on July 12, 2007, Shannon helped launch the return. On November 18, as part of CBS-FM's weekly Radio Greats feature, he hosted a show as Don Bombard.

Shannon stopped performing his mid-day shift at WCBS-FM in July 2012. It was reported that he left the station for health reasons. He was eventually replaced by Ron Parker.

== Death ==
Shannon died on June 28, 2023, at the age of 74 after a long battle with respiratory illness. He leaves behind two children, Scott and Avery Shannon.
