= Thomas Cowan (broadcaster) =

Thomas H. Cowan (1884 - November 8, 1969) was a 20th-century radio announcer, one of the first to broadcast from Newark radio station WJZ. He became known for his role in doing the play-by-play of the first Baseball World Series game to be broadcast, on October 5, 1921. Evidence suggests he recreated the game from the WJZ studio, rather than doing live play-by-play from the ballpark. He became the chief announcer for the country's first city-owned and non-commercial radio station in the United States, New York City’s WNYC, from its first broadcast in 1925. He was the announcer “for the myriad of parades, receptions and celebrations from the 1920s through the 1950s, especially early on when athletes and aviators came to town ( New York City) after making or breaking world records.” His career in radio spanned 40 years until his retirement in 1961 at age 77, when he was the oldest active announcer in the radio community.

== Early life before radio ==
Thomas H. Cowan (known as Tommy) was born in Newark, New Jersey in 1884. He attended school until he was 14 years old when he went to work for The World as an office boy. In 1898 he switched jobs and became the receptionist or greeter for Thomas Edison at the Edison Laboratory in West Orange, New Jersey. To quote Tommy himself he called it “a kind of Grover Whalen job” where he greeted important visitors to the laboratories of Edison and Westinghouse.

== Introduction to radio and the beginnings of broadcasting station WJZ ==
Station WJZ was licensed on June 1, 1921 and was the first long term station, regularly broadcasting to the New York area. The studio and the station's transmitter were located on the roof of Westinghouse Meter Plant in Newark N.J. at the corner of Plane and Orange. Even though the station had been licensed to broadcast in June of that year the station was not ready and did not start to broadcast until October 1921. The station was hastily put together for the upcoming 1921 World Series between the New York Giants and the New York Yankees to make the most of the fight between Dempsey and Carpentier in July of that year, which had taken place just three months before.

After Westinghouse had chosen the engineer and station manager of the station, Charles B. Popenoe and his assistant engineer, George Blitzoitis, Westinghouse had to choose an announcer. Tommy was chosen for the position even though, like the other people in the studio, he had no experience in radio. "On a day in 1921 Tommy was told to go up to the roof, to the shack. They were going to try to "make this thing talk". He basically started from scratch and learned as things came his way. It was alleged that the first words uttered on the air waves by Cowan were “You are listening to the radio telephone broadcasting station, WJZ, in Newark, N.J.”. He later repeated those same words several times not knowing if anyone was tuning in but later admitted that he doubted that anyone was actually listening.

== The World Series broadcast for the first time to the masses ==
After the station was set up and running the question came to Tommy as to what he should broadcast on the station. He had struggled with this question since the station did not have a phonograph of its own to play music and the direction of the station and what it broadcast was left to him. It turns out that the station had turned its attention to sports casting by a lucky phone call. The call came from Sandy Hunt who was a sports writer for the Newark Sunday Call who suggested that the station broadcast the 1921 World Series. After talking it over with the rest of the station's staff they all said they were ready to accept the challenge.

There were two main reasons why everyone agreed to the idea. First, that the game was to be set between two New York baseball teams, the New York Yankees and the New York Giants, two very big rivals. Secondly, the games were to be played at the polo grounds which were right in the station's area and so WJZ was the station closest to the event. The next nearest station was KDKA, 300 miles away in Pittsburgh.

Since the technology at the time was not advanced enough for the game to be directly broadcast from the Polo Grounds, Cowan had to rely on someone being at the Polo Grounds to relay a play by play of the game by telephone. From a radio shack on top of the Westinghouse plant, he related the action on air with his own words. This did not happen without problems. The first hurdle was the cooperation of the telephone company which saw WJZ and Westinghouse as its rival. The telephone company did not accept the request by the station to provide a direct wire between the New York Stadiums and the WJZ station, so Sandy and Tommy tried a different approach. They rented a box seat in Yankee Stadium and the Polo Grounds and put in a request again for a simple phone to be installed in the box. After some persuasion the phone company complied with their request.

Sandy Hunt would go to the game for the Newark Sunday Call to relay the game back to Tommy Cowan by telephone. The communication between Sandy and Cowan was in one direction only and Cowan could not ask questions of Hunt because the audience would hear it and become confused. He was not able to write things down or keep score so by the end of the first game he had forgotten the score and was not able to give the final result. The other trouble was the hours of sitting with a phone set against his ear. His hand became numb and his ear sore, but by the second game of the series he had gotten more comfortable and relaxed by using a headphone.

== Result of the Broadcast ==
The remote broadcast of the 1921 World Series by Thomas Cowan and the studio of WJZ was hld to be a success. Around 4000 pieces of mail flooded the station thanking them for their public service for the many people who could not come to the game. It seemed that as a result, sports broadcasting in the United States changed from merely being sports to being a part of the news.

The broadcast did not only effect the world of baseball but the world of radio itself. In the following years radio would be used to cover large events, bringing the news and accomplishments of the world to even larger audiences. "Radio exploded across America, broadcasting the first-ever radio commercial in 1922, the 1925 Cubs-Pirates season opener, the 1925 Scopes monkey trial, the Charles Lindbergh cross-Atlantic Paris landing in 1927, the 1927 Jack Dempsey "long-count fight" and much more, all while inventing the sit-com as we know it with the forerunner to "Amos 'n' Andy" in 1926 and then "The Goldbergs" in 1929."

== After WJZ ==
Before leaving WJZ in 1925 to join the WNYC Tommy had covered the Democratic National Convention of June 1924 in Madison Square Garden. “WNYC’s founder Grover A. Whalen convinced Cowan to be WNYC's Chief Announcer, and his was the first voice heard when we went on the air July 8, 1924.” Says WYNC’s web article about him. Cowan stayed with the station until his retirement in 1961. During his 40-year career he covered many major events in New York City, from parades to presidential addresses.

== Death ==
Thomas Cowan died at age 85 at his home in West Orange, N.J. on Saturday, November 8, 1969 and was survived by his three sisters.
