= Sanford Hunt =

American football player and newspaper editor (1881–1943)

Profile
- Position: Guard

Personal information
- Born: January 2, 1881; Irvington, New Jersey, U.S.
- Died: March 31, 1943 (aged 62); Newark, New Jersey, U.S.

Career information
- College: Cornell University (1901–1903)

Awards and highlights
- Consensus All-American (1901)

Sanford Beebe Hunt II (January 2, 1881 – March 31, 1943) was an American football player and newspaper editor. He played college football for the Cornell Big Red football team and was selected as a consensus All-American at the guard position in 1901. He was also an editor and director of The Newark Sunday Call.

Hunt was born in 1881 at Irvington, New Jersey. His father, William Talmadge Hunt. In 1888, he moved with his family to Newark, where his father served as the editor-in-chief of The Sunday Call. He received his education at St. George's Hall in Summit, New Jersey, and at St. Paul's School in Garden City, New York. His grandfather Dr. Sanford Beebe Hunt was Surgeon-in-Chief of the Army of the South-West during the Civil War and edited the Newark Daily Advertiser until his death in 1884.

Hunt attended Cornell University where he played college football for the Cornell Big Red from 1900 to 1903. He was selected as a consensus All-American in 1901 at the guard position. He was also the captain of Cornell's 1903 football team. He was a member of the Quill and Dagger senior honor society and the Chi Psi fraternity at Cornell.

From 1905 to 1907, he was employed in construction, working on the construction of Lake Carnegie and other projects. From 1907 to 1912, he worked on the Pacific Coast as a mining engineer. In January 1910, he was the superintendent of the Homestake Mining Company at Yerington, Nevada. He also served as an assistant football coach at Cornell in 1909 and at the University of Oregon in 1910 and 1911.

From 1912 to 1924, Hunt worked in the newspaper industry in New Jersey. In 1921, he played a role in the first ever radio broadcast of the World Series. Hunt was on site at the Polo Grounds and relayed the plays over telephone to engineer Thomas Cowan, who would then repeat them over the radio. From 1924 to 1940, Hunt lived in Santa Cruz, California, where he operated a fruit farm. In 1940, he returned to New Jersey and became an associate editor and board member of The Newark Sunday Call.

Hunt was married in 1914 to May A. Chambers, sister of actor Wheaton Chambers . They had three children, Sanford B. Hunt, Jr., William Talmadge Hunt, and Mrs. Paul E. Colegrove. Hunt died in 1943 in Newark.

His son Col. Sanford B. Hunt Jr., (U. S. Marine Corps) participated in the assault and seizure of Guadalcanal where he was awarded the Bronze Star Medal with combat "V".
