= Ron Lundy =

American DJ

- Born: Fred Ronald Lundy; June 25, 1934; Memphis, Tennessee, U.S.
- Died: March 15, 2010 (aged 75); Oxford, Mississippi, U.S.
- Spouse: Shirley Ann Barnes

Fred Ronald Lundy (June 25, 1934 – March 15, 2010) was a popular radio announcer in New York City, heard on WABC 770 AM from 1965 to 1982 and on WCBS-FM 101.1 from 1984 until his retirement in 1997.

== Career ==
Lundy was born June 25, 1934, in Memphis, Tennessee, the only child of Fred Sr., a railroad engineer, and Mary Lundy. He served in the United States Marine Corps after graduating from high school. Following the completion of his military stint, he returned to his hometown and attended a local radio broadcasting school on the G.I. Bill. At the same time, he worked across the street at WHHM-AM, where he got his first on-air experience one night when he substituted for the regular disc jockey who failed to report for his shift. This resulted in Lundy being hired as a full-time radio announcer by Hodding Carter for WDDT 1330 AM, the latter's new station in Greenville, Mississippi.

After a stop in Baton Rouge, Louisiana, at WLCS-AM, Lundy was brought to WIL-AM in St. Louis, Missouri, in 1960 by Dan Ingram, who was the station's program director until the middle of the next year. Nicknamed the "Wil' Child", Lundy had a style which was described as a combination of "country and crawfish pie" by broadcaster Bob Whitney, who also played a major role in the appointment.

Lundy was reunited with Ingram at WABC 770 AM in 1965. He made his New York radio debut on September 1, working the overnight shift as "The Swingin' Nightwalker." Beginning in May 1966, he became the midday fixture at the station for the next sixteen years. With his catchphrase "Hello, Love—this is Ron Lundy from the Greatest City in the World," he usually preceded Ingram's afternoon drive time program, and sometimes when Ingram was running late to the studio, Lundy would keep going until Dan arrived, doing impressions of The Shadow, where he would play Margo Lane and Lamont Cranston. The two best friends hosted The Last Show before WABC's format conversion from music to talk radio at noon on May 10, 1982.

In February 1984, Lundy resurfaced at New York's oldies station WCBS-FM in the mid-morning slot, following former WABC colleague Harry Harrison. According to program director Joe McCoy, the station created the slot especially for Lundy, reducing other shifts from four hours to three.

In June 1997, Lundy's WCBS-FM show was awarded the 1997 "BronzeWorld Medal" at the New York Festivals Radio Programming Awards for the "best local personality".

Lundy retired from WCBS-FM on September 18, 1997. Ron and his wife Shirley moved to the small town of Bruce, Mississippi. However, during this time, Lundy did occasional interviews with Mark Simone on The Saturday Night Oldies Show for his former station, WABC.

Lundy's voice made two cameo appearances during his career. The first one was in an early scene in Midnight Cowboy, when Joe Buck, hearing a Lundy WABC broadcast while listening to his portable radio, realized that the bus he was riding soon approached New York City. The other was in WCBS-FM's customized version of Starship's 1985 hit "We Built This City" (heard only on their station, not to be confused with the original commercial studio version which featured former disc jockey Les Garland).

Lundy was inducted into the St. Louis Hall Radio Hall of Fame on January 1, 2006, with a banquet held June 10, 2006.

== Death ==
Lundy died of a heart attack at age 75 on March 15, 2010, at a hospital in Oxford, Mississippi. He had recently been recovering from a previous heart attack after being dehydrated.

== Family ==
Ron's widow, Shirley Ann Barnes Lundy, died on Feb. 2, 2013 at age 76 in Bruce, Mississippi.

== Characters ==
Lundy's show included banter with his created characters. Among them:

- "Willard" (himself, imitating a duck that sounded a great deal like Donald Duck)
- "Mama" (voice of engineer Al Vertucci)
- "Bubba" (voice of production director Bob Sagendorf)
