= WCBS-FM =

Classic hits radio station in New York City

- New York, New York; United States
- Broadcast area: New York metropolitan area
- Frequency: 101.1 MHz (HD Radio)
- Branding: 101.1 CBS-FM

Programming
- Language: English
- Format: Classic hits
- Subchannels: HD2: Sports radio (WHSQ); HD3: Caribbean music

Ownership
- Owner: Audacy, Inc.; (Audacy License, LLC)
- Sister stations: WFAN; WFAN-FM; WHSQ; WINS; WINS-FM; WNEW-FM; WXBK

History
- First air date: December 1, 1941
- Former call signs: W67NY (1941–1943); WABC-FM (1943–1947)
- Former frequencies: 46.7 MHz (1941–1943); 96.9 MHz (1943–1947)
- Call sign meaning: Columbia Broadcasting System, the former legal name of former owner CBS

Technical information
- Licensing authority: FCC
- Facility ID: 9611
- Class: B
- ERP: 6,700 watts (analog); 267 watts (digital)
- HAAT: 408 meters (1,339 ft)
- Transmitter coordinates: 40.748°N 73.986°W

Links
- Public license information: Public file; LMS
- Webcast: Listen live (via Audacy); Listen live (via iHeartRadio)
- Website: www.audacy.com/wcbsfm

WCBS-FM (101.1 FM) is a radio station owned and operated by Audacy, Inc. licensed to New York, New York, and broadcasting a classic hits format. The station's studios are in the combined Audacy facility in the Hudson Square neighborhood in Lower Manhattan, and its transmitter is located at the Empire State Building.

WCBS-FM was one of the first notable oldies stations in the country, with the format dating back to July 7, 1972. Between June 3, 2005, and July 12, 2007, the station aired the automated adult hits format "Jack FM". The new programming was unsuccessful, and WCBS-FM switched back to a personality-driven classic hits format. The station is continually ranked one of the highest-rated stations in the New York market, as well as one of the highest-rated classic hits stations in the United States.

== History ==
=== Early years ===
In 1940, during the early days of FM broadcasting, what is now WCBS-FM was allocated an FM frequency and call sign, W67NY, becoming CBS's first FM station. The original transmitter site was located at 500 Fifth Avenue. The allocated frequency changed several times before the station finally went on the air at 46.7 MHz on December 1, 1941. On November 1, 1943, the callsign was changed to WABC-FM for Atlantic Broadcasting Company, the former owner of CBS's AM station (no relation to the present-day WABC). With the reallocation of the FM band, WABC-FM's new frequency became 96.9 MHz; finally, in September 1947 the station became WCBS-FM, and the frequency moved to the current 101.1. This allowed the station to reflect its corporate ownership by the Columbia Broadcasting System (CBS). The transmitter was moved to the Empire State Building in the early 1950s.

For many years, WCBS-FM simulcast its programming with its AM sister station. From the 1940s until the late 1950s, both stations aired a typical network-dominated general entertainment format with comedies, dramas, news and information, sports, talk shows and some music. As these types of radio shows either moved to television or were canceled outright, WCBS and WCBS-FM evolved toward a personality-oriented format featuring news and information, popular music, and sports. As rock and roll became popular, the stations played only softer songs of the genre.

Each of the stations began broadcasting its own programming in 1966. The AM station retained its personality-oriented middle of the road format until August 27, 1967. WCBS-FM initially programmed a younger-leaning easy listening format known as "The Young Sound", playing soft instrumental versions of current pop music songs. This automated format was syndicated to CBS stations across the country and to AFN (American Forces Network). On August 27, 1967, the AM station had to launch its news format (which was not full-time until 1972) on WCBS-FM because a small airplane had crashed into the AM radio tower a few hours earlier.

In 1969, WCBS-FM launched a freeform rock format, which was becoming increasingly popular, and all other CBS-owned FM stations followed suit. For the first time, WCBS-FM would have an airstaff. Bill Brown began his long tenure with the station, and Don K. Reed began his late in 1971; both remained there until 2005. Radio personalities such as Bobby "Wizzard" Wayne, Tom Tyler, Ed Williams, Steve Clark, Roby Yonge, K.O. Bayley (Bob Elliott from WOR-FM), Les Turpin, Bob "Bob-A-Lew" Lewis also briefly joined the WCBS-FM "freeform" format. Besides Bill Brown and Don K. Reed, Wayne and Williams also stayed into the early part of the oldies format.

=== Original oldies years and greatest hits ===
WCBS-FM was never successful with their rock format, where it competed with stations such as WPLJ and WNEW-FM; these two stations had most of the rock audience. As a result, WCBS-FM switched to oldies on July 7, 1972, becoming one of the first full-time stations in the country to use that format. The change coincided with rival WOR-FM's decision to drop pre-1964 oldies from its playlist a few months prior (as they became WXLO). Johnny Michaels, formerly of WMCA, played the first record, Dion's "Runaround Sue". The entire staff from the rock format remained at the station.

At first, the station focused on rock-and-roll hits from 1955 to 1964 and mixed in some softer hits of the late 1960s and early 1970s, as well as a few then-current songs. WCBS-FM also played a moderate number of adult standards from the rock era. The station played two current hits per hour known as "future gold". By the late 1970s however, the station dropped most of the adult standards, with a few exceptions, and added rock hits from the late 1960s. WCBS-FM's oldies format weathered many trends and corporate moves. By 1979, three FM stations owned by CBS had begun playing disco music. In the course of 1981, all of CBS's FM stations, except for WCBS-FM and their FM station in San Francisco, adopted a CHR format known as "Hot Hits". The oldies format on WCBS-FM continued to be a success.

One ongoing feature was a countdown of the top 500 songs of all time, as voted by the station's listeners. The countdown always took place on Thanksgiving weekend (with a new survey taken every other year). On even years, up to 1990, the survey from the previous year was played. In the first Top 500, The Five Satins' doo wop classic "In the Still of the Night" was No. 1 and "Earth Angel" by The Penguins was No. 2. "In the Still of the Night" remained at No. 1 every year after that. In 1992, WCBS-FM ran a Top 500 Countdown based on all their surveys from 1973 to 1991. They repeated 1993's Top 500 in 1994, conducting their last listener surveys in 1995 and 1996. After compiling an all-time survey based on past surveys in 1997, the station abandoned listener surveys, repeating the 1997 all-time survey on subsequent Thanksgiving weekends. For New Years weekend in 1999–2000, the station compiled and played a Top 1001 countdown based on original New York radio charts, with "Mack The Knife" by Bobby Darin at number one. This survey would be repeated on Thanksgiving weekend in 2002. In 2003, the station played a Top 500 Countdown covering the 1960s, 1970s, 1980s, and some 1950s songs, and in 2004 played a Top 500 Countdown with mostly songs from 1964 to 1979 with some pre-1964 songs and 1980s songs. When the station returned to a modified oldies and classic hits format in 2007, the station compiled a new listener-voted survey and played the results Labor Day weekend. This survey featured mostly songs from the 1960s and 1970s with a moderate selection of songs from the 1955–1963 time period. There was also a moderate amount of 1980s music on the survey.

Joe McCoy took over as program director in 1981, and at that point WCBS-FM began to gradually shift its focus to the 1964–1969 era, but would also feature more pre-1964 oldies than most other such stations of that decade. The station continued to also feature hits of the 1970s and some hits of the 1980s while cutting future gold selections to one per hour. Also in the 1980s, after WABC and later WNBC abandoned music in favor of talk, WCBS-FM began employing many disc jockeys who were widely known on other New York City stations (and sometimes nationally), most notably Musicradio 77 WABC alumni Ron Lundy, Dan Ingram, Bruce "Cousin Brucie" Morrow, and Harry Harrison, as well as former WMCA "Good Guys" Dan Daniel and Jack Spector. Bob Shannon, whose only previous New York City radio experience before coming to WCBS-FM was as a fill-in DJ at WYNY, became well-known himself through his 19-year run as the station's afternoon disk jockey. Bill Brown (who had started with the station in 1969, during their rock days) and Don K. Reed (who started at the station 6 months before the switch to oldies) remained with the station during their entire first period as an oldies station.

In 1989, WCBS-FM limited current music to late nights and overnights. While most oldies stations were playing songs from exclusively 1955 to 1973, WCBS-FM continued to play a moderate number of songs from the late 1970s as well as about one 1980s hit per hour. Most of the 1980s music came from core oldies artists.

The station's ratings increased during the 1990s (and were sustained into the 2000s) and market research studies showed a small and growing audience in the 35-to-49-year-old demographic as a new generation's "songs they grew up with" moved into the oldies format. The station even hit number one overall in the ratings on at least several occasions during the 1990s. During this period, the station's on-air jingles were made by JAM Creative Productions in Dallas. Such was the appeal of the packages of jingles that stations around the world wanted that WCBS-FM sound for their stations, including for example the UK's Radio Victory.

By 2000, as demographics for 1950s and early 1960s oldies started to eclipse the target age groups that many advertisers covet, WCBS-FM began cutting pre-1964 songs while adding more music from the 1970s and 1980s. In January 2001, they stopped playing currents and 90's hits on the overnight, dropping them altogether. The station also had cut specialty shows such as Bobby Jay's Soul of the City on Wednesdays, Thursday Night 60's, Friday night's Heart & Soul of Rock & Roll, Monday Night 70's, and Bobby Jay's late night Saturday show Jukebox Saturday Night. Eventually, they began to shorten the regular playlist and moved away from pre-1964 and toward 1970–1989 songs even more. In the summer of 2002, Don K. Reed's long-running Sunday night Doo-Wop Shop program was cancelled. The station even began to de-emphasize the phrase 'oldies' in promotion of the station.

The station canceled more specialty shows in 2003, such as the Top 20 Oldies Countdown. In the summer of 2003, to appease some fans, they did add a specialty 1955–1964 oldies show called Heart & Soul of Rock & Roll with Norm N. Nite (who had been with WCBS off and on since 1973). Also in that year, Harry Harrison and Dan Ingram both retired. In spring 2004, WCBS-FM narrowed the playlist even more. The station's playlist consisted of music almost entirely from 1964 to 1979, dividing about equally between the 1960s and 1970s, playing only a handful of pre-1964 oldies and songs from the 1980s. Joe McCoy left the station shortly thereafter and was replaced by Dave Logan. WCBS-FM's last morning show host of this period was ex-Monkee Micky Dolenz, who had appeal to this audience segment by virtue of 1970s reruns of his band's eponymous television series and the mid-1980s Monkees revival. His last broadcast on June 3, 2005, was a remote at a Manhattan restaurant to celebrate his 100th day at the station. However, by the end of that day, the station would be changed dramatically.

=== 101.1 Jack FM: Playing What We Want ===
In the spring of 2005, Infinity Broadcasting, which was CBS' radio division during that time, contracted with Sparknet Communications, which owns the licensing of an Adult Hits format branded as "Jack FM", a format that has seen on-air success in Canadian areas since the early 2000s. In return, Sparknet Communications gave Infinity Broadcasting permission to bring the "Jack FM" format to some of Infinity's radio markets in the United States. That April, Infinity flipped radio stations KCBS-FM in Los Angeles and WQSR in Baltimore to the "Jack FM" format. On Friday, June 3, 2005, Micky Dolenz, Mike Fitzgerald, and Randy Davis all signed off their shows expecting to be back the following Monday. However, Bill Brown signed off at about 3:53 p.m. saying, "CBS-FM 101.1, Fontella Bass... Do you ever feel the urge to just kinda scream, "RESCUE ME!?"... I'm beginning to get that feeling, here's Fontella Bass." The station segued to "Use Me" by Bill Withers. Then, at 4:00 pm, the station played the usual station identification, and then a mix of oldies and greatest hits referring to change, including "Movin' Out (Anthony's Song)", "Get a Job", "Glory Days" and "Hit the Road Jack" (the last song of which had the word "Jack" edited out, giving an advance hint to the new format), among others. Frank Sinatra's "Summer Wind" was the last song played before the format change. At 4:30 pm, the station stunted with a 30-minute montage of lines from various movies and other sources.

At 5:00 pm, a pre-recorded station identification was played followed by a short introduction of the new adult hits format by new station voiceover Howard Cogan, and the announcement of the new station name: "Welcome to the NEW "101.1 Jack FM", Playing What We Want." The first song aired was Beastie Boys' "Fight for Your Right". The format featured nearly 2,000 unique songs in the playlist. With this move, WCBS-FM had left the oldies format after 33 years. In an attempt to cater to fans of the old format, the station created an internet-only oldies station on its website, and soon after, simulcasted the format on 101.1-HD2. Initially, the internet-only station was DJ-less like Jack FM on the analog 101.1 and HD1 station; in between songs, the station played jingles plus pre-recorded voice overs done by their production director. In a letter on the WCBS-FM website posted on June 5, 2005, station VP Chad Brown announced the webstream would try to bring back most of the original shows and DJs, and that eventually the station would also be able to be heard on HD Radio. The change left WBZO as the only FM station playing any type of oldies format in the market. Its signal in the Metropolitan area was weak, however, because it operated out of Long Island, and aired an outright oldies format, unlike WCBS-FM's old "Greatest Hits" format.

Many criticized the change of formats, among them Mayor Michael Bloomberg, who, according to the New York Post, responded to the change by declaring he would "never listen to that fucking CBS radio ever again" (the quote was censored in the Post). "Jack" picked up on the mayor's comments, making jokes about his quip, "Hey, Mayor Bloomberg. I heard you took a shot at us in the Post. What's with all the swearin' like a sailor? Fleet Week is over. It's just music." In an interview with the New York Daily News, Cousin Brucie likened the format switch to "replacing Yankee Stadium with a fruit stand". Cousin Brucie moved over to Sirius Satellite Radio's '60s on 6 channel to continue playing oldies. Recognizing the controversy of the sudden change, on June 14, 2005, the station announced that it would be unique among those with the Jack format in that it would occasionally include 1950s and early 1960s songs in its rotation as well as songs by performers like Frank Sinatra that are normally not part of the Jack format, though a later Web update retracted this, and songs from before the late 1960s were no longer played.

In March 2006, Chad Brown hired Brian Thomas as program director, replacing Steve Smith. Brown was replaced by Les Hollander later that year after a big layoff of personnel at CBS Radio. In 2007, Jennifer Donohue (from WWFS) was named as Jack's new general manager. Later that year, Maire Mason replaced Donohue.

=== Classic hits format ===
The "Jack" format experiment at WCBS-FM is widely regarded, inside and outside the industry, as one of the greatest failures in modern New York radio history, as the station fell to the very bottom of the ratings of full-market-coverage FM stations in the New York market. In early July 2007, various websites quoted sources as saying the station was ready to shift from its current "Jack FM" format and return to its previous format. CBS Radio, owner of the station, declined to comment on the rumors. Initial reports about the WCBS-FM format change initially surfaced on July 6, 2007, in the Radio Business Report online newsletter and at CrainsNewYorkBusiness.com. CBS Radio confirmed the rumors on July 9, 2007, that live announcers would indeed return to 101.1 and the HD1 channel on July 12, meaning that the "Jack" format in New York had run its course after two years, likely due to its lackluster ratings. The returning format would concentrate on music from 1964 to 1989, with selected older hits from 1955 through 1963. There would be a wider variety of hits, unlike the CBS-FM of 2005, which had a limited playlist from 1964 through 1979.

On July 12, at approximately 12:40 pm, "Jack FM" ended with "Don't Stop Believin'" by Journey, ending in the same spot where the song abruptly ended during the series finale of The Sopranos. Then, after a few seconds of dead air and a few seconds of a "Wayback Machine" audio special effect, the oldies format returned with the resumption of the last song played before the change to Jack FM, Frank Sinatra's "Summer Wind" (starting like a phonograph record played very slowly but quickly accelerated to normal speed). This was followed by greetings from former WCBS-FM DJs Harry Harrison and Ron Lundy. Next were audio-clip montages of music, movies, television shows, and events for each year from 1964 through 1979 followed by a single montage, similar to the aforementioned, which paid homage to the entire decade of the 1980s, with WCBS-FM jingles interspersed between. Former Mayor Ed Koch then welcomed back the format, noting the "mistake" CBS Radio had made with the switch. Then at exactly 1:01 pm, the legally mandated station identification played, and WCBS-FM's classic hits format officially returned with "Do It Again" by the Beach Boys. This sequence is now repeated on-air every July 12. WOCL in Orlando used the same sequence (with the montage starting with 1966 and running clips for every year through 1989) the following year, dropping alternative rock for classic hits, and later WJMK in Chicago also used the same sequence (with a few Chicago-themed modifications) on March 14, 2011, when they switched from Jack FM to a classic hits format.

Upon hearing of WCBS-FM's confirmation that oldies would return, Cousin Brucie commented, "I'm thrilled that this music is getting a chance again." He added, "This music has been treated terribly, and people in their 40s, 50s, 60s and 70s are still a very viable product in this society." Mayor Bloomberg, who had criticized the Jack FM format after its debut, also welcomed oldies back with open arms, proclaiming July 12, 2007, as "WCBS-FM Returns to New York City Day". Arbitron's switch from diary to PPM facilitated a move back to oldies and classic hits as sister station WOGL in Philadelphia had demonstrated ratings success in the new methodology by reaching the top five. WCBS-FM's return to classic hits has also been a success, ranking it among the top five stations in every quarter of the new ratings for Arbitron, consistently either first or second in overall audience. In 2010, the station was number one among all stations in the New York region, 25-54 and 12+ (Arbitron PPM report, May 2010). The station went to number one again in the July 2014 and August 2017 ratings periods.

As of August 2009, WCBS-FM started carrying New York Giants football on occasions when sister station WFAN could not carry the game. For the 2010 season, two Giants pre-season games and two regular season games were carried on WCBS-FM including the first game at the New Meadowlands Stadium against the New York Jets on August 16.

In the fall of 2014, the station dropped the pre-1964 oldies altogether and also dropped many of the songs from the 1960s, cutting the number down to one to two per hour. In addition, the station broadened their format to include select hits from the 1990s, up to about 1999. On November 19, 2016, the "Saturday Night Block Party" was discontinued after four years in favor of regular programming. On July 9, 2017, Backtrax USA, hosted by former WHTZ jock Kid Kelly, debuted on WCBS-FM on Sunday nights. Prior to 2016, WCBS-FM used JAM Creative Productions, Inc. for their jingles. However, to focus on a new and changing demographic, they now use ReelWorld for their jingles. As of 2018, WCBS-FM no longer uses any JAM jingles, and the station also no longer plays any music from the 1960s, while also starting to cut back on the amount of early 1970s music played. Gradually and subtly, WCBS-FM is increasing the frequency of 1980s and 1990s hits per day and is also adding music from the 2000s.

On February 2, 2017, CBS agreed to merge CBS Radio with Entercom, currently the fourth-largest radio broadcaster in the United States; the sale was conducted using a Reverse Morris Trust so that it would be tax-free. While CBS shareholders retained a 72% ownership stake in the combined company, Entercom was the surviving entity, separating WCBS radio (both 101.1 FM and 880 AM) from WCBS-TV. The merger was approved on November 9, 2017, and was consummated on November 17. As part of the agreement with CBS, Entercom was given the rights to use the brand and trademarks for WCBS-FM along with sister stations WCBS (AM), KCBS (AM) in San Francisco and KCBS-FM in Los Angeles for a 20-year period after which Entercom (or succeeding entity) will be required to relinquish using those call-letters.

== Signal strength ==
WCBS-FM broadcasts at 6,700 watts. Co-owned WBEB, an adult contemporary station in Philadelphia, also broadcasts on 101.1 MHz. WBEB's signal reaches far north into New Jersey, especially along Interstate 287 south of Morristown, and in Northwestern New Jersey. In those areas WBEB interferes with WCBS-FM, and in some spots, WBEB's signal actually seems stronger. This is because WBEB broadcasts at 14,000 watts, although from a lower antenna height.

WCBS-FM's subcarrier also airs Spanish language Catholic programming for New York, New Jersey and Connecticut from Radio Maria Hispana, a local unit of Radio Maria USA.

== HD radio operations ==
A few hours after the change back from Jack FM, WCBS-FM's 1960s and 1970s music was brought back online on the stations website. CBS-FM's longtime music director Jeff Mazzei was retained as program director of the wcbsfm.com oldies stream. Over the next couple of weeks, the station started playing pre-1964 oldies again. Additionally, the 1960s and 1970s oldies became broader and 1980s and early 1990s oldies were also mixed in, and the format got much deeper. However, it was commercial-free and had no airstaff. WCBS-FM HD2 also began broadcasting in HD Radio on December 12, 2005 (before most of the other New York stations, which launched in early 2006).

Air personalities did on-air auditions on the WCBS-FM HD2 oldies station on July 11, 2007, as a preview of the next day's changeover. The format then moved to the analog and HD1 channels. The HD2 station also simulcast the oldies format until 2:00 p.m. that day, at which time Jack FM moved to HD2. At 3:00 p.m. that day, Jack FM resumed streaming on their website. In February 2008, Howard Cogan was replaced by Pat St. John as the pre-recorded voice of the Jack character on WCBS-FM HD2 and ilikejack.com. On May 7, 2008, the Jack branding was dropped from WCBS-FM HD2 and was just called 101.1 HD2 or WCBS-FM HD2 due to the end of a licensing agreement with the owner of the Jack name and slogan, Sparknet Communications. During the holiday season in 2008, WCBS-FM's HD1 and analog signal played Christmas music, resulting in the oldies format being temporarily moved back to the HD2 channel. In late June 2009, the HD2 channel was rebranded again as ToNY, meaning "to New York" but pronounced as "Tony". The channel continued to feature an adult hits format until December 21, 2012, when it was dropped and replaced with a simulcast of WCBS.

On October 2, 2008, WCBS-FM HD3 was launched as a simulcast of WCBS. On January 2, 2013, WCBS-FM HD3 flipped to CBS Sports Radio. In February 2021, the HD3 sub-channel flipped to The True Oldies Channel; CBS Sports Radio would subsequently move to WNSH's HD3 sub-channel.

On May 1, 2024, WCBS-FM HD3 switched from the "True Oldies Channel" to Caribbean programming as "Roadblock Radio".

== See also ==
- WHSQ
- WCBS-TV
- List of radio stations in New York (state)
