= Dan Ingram =

American radio broadcaster

- Born: Daniel Trombley Ingram; September 7, 1934; Oceanside, New York, U.S.
- Died: June 24, 2018 (aged 83); Fort Lauderdale, Florida, U.S.
- Occupations: Radio disc jockey; voice over artist
- Years active: 1958–2003
- Spouses: Kathleen Snediker (died in car accident in 1962); Anita Strand (divorced); Jeannie Weigel (divorced); Maureen Donnelly
- Children: 5 sons, 4 daughters, 2 stepdaughters

Daniel Trombley Ingram (September 7, 1934 – June 24, 2018) was an American Top 40 radio "disc jockey", in a 50-year career on radio stations, which included WABC and WCBS-FM, both in New York City.

== Career ==
"Big Dan" started broadcasting at WHCH Hofstra College, Hempstead; WNRC, New Rochelle; and WALK-FM, Patchogue, all in New York State.

Ingram was one of the most highly regarded DJs from his era. He was noted for his quick wit and ability to convey a humorous or satiric idea with fast pacing and an economy of words, a skill that rendered him uniquely suited to, and successful within, modern personality-driven music radio. He was among the most frequently emulated radio personalities, cited as an influence or inspiration by numerous current broadcasters. One of Ingram's unique skills was his ability to "talk up" to the lyrics of a record, meaning speaking over the musical introduction and finishing exactly at the point when the lyrics started.

Ingram was well known for playing doctored versions of popular songs. The Paul McCartney and Wings lyrics "My Love Does it Good" from "My Love" became "My Glove Does it Good". The stuttering title refrain of Elton John's "Bennie and the Jets" went from three or four repetitions to countless. In the same vein, the distinctive refrain added to "Hooked on a Feeling" by Blue Swede, "Ooga-chucka-ooga-ooga" would start repeating and listeners would never know when it would end. Paul Simon's "50 Ways to Leave Your Lover" became "50 Ways to Love Your Leaver" and "49 Ways to Relieve Your Liver", and Ingram "rearranged" the spelling of "S-A-T-U-R-D-A-Y" on the Bay City Rollers' "Saturday Night". He had a daily "Honor Group of the Day" (for example, cops on the beat), and a "Word of the Day" (such as humdinger).

His longtime closing theme song was "Tri-Fi Drums" by Billy May. An edited version of the song was used for broadcast.

TV commercials Ingram narrated include a 1970 promo for free cut-out records of Archies songs on the backs of Post Honeycomb and Alpha-Bits cereals. Ingram also worked for cable channel HBO in the mid-1980s, mostly as the off-camera host of HBO Coming Attractions (a monthly show featuring previews of HBO's upcoming programming; occasionally he would co-host with another HBO voice, Joyce Gordon) and various voiceover roles, though he did occasionally appear on camera in early 1986 as part of the HBO Weekend interstitials of the time. Ingram also served as the voiceover announcer for the TV Land Network in the 1990's. Ingram voiced many television commercials and motion picture trailers.

Ingram was also featured prominently in his son Chris's book, Hey Kemosabe! The Days (and Nights) of a Radio Idyll, a fictionalized account of the Musicradio WABC era.

== On air history ==
- 1958: WICC, Bridgeport, Connecticut (under the name Rae Tayler)
- 1958: WNHC, New Haven, Connecticut
- 1959: KBOX, Dallas, Texas
- 1959-1960: WIL, St. Louis, Missouri
- July 3, 1961-May 10, 1982: WABC, New York City. He and Ron Lundy were on-air as the station switched to TalkRadio.
- April 1984-December 1986: Hosted CBS Radio's Top 40 Satellite Survey (aired on 118 stations across the United States as of March 1985).
- 1984-June 1985: WKTU (92.3 FM), New York City
- 1986-1987: announcer for Nightlife, a late-night TV talk show hosted by David Brenner
- 1987-1988: The Weekend Music Review, a weekly Adult Contemporary radio program that counted down the top 20 AC records today, and highlighted what was going on 20, 15, 10, and 1 yr ago that weekend. JAM Creative Productions, Dallas produced and syndicated from 1987 to 1988. Julie Sizemore handled affiliate relations. Dan Ingram was host of "The Weekend Music Review" 3 hour AC show.
- October 1991-June 2003, September 16, 2007: New York Radio Greats on WCBS-FM, New York City
- June 1998: KRTH, Los Angeles. One week as "guest DJ," ostensibly a tryout for the morning drive spot previously held by Robert W. Morgan, who had died a month earlier. The job went to Charlie Van Dyke.
- February 8, 2004: Fab-40th Weekend on WAXQ, New York

== Personal life ==
Ingram had been diagnosed with Parkinsonian syndrome in 2014, and died in 2018 after choking while eating. He was survived by his wife, Maureen Donnelly. He also had five sons (Christopher, Daniel, David, Robert, and Phillip), four daughters (Patricia, Michelle, Christina, and Jacqueline), two stepdaughters (Laura and Linda), 26 grandchildren, and 12 great-grandchildren.

His brother was John W. Ingram, who was the final president of the Chicago, Rock Island and Pacific Railroad when the company went bankrupt on March 31, 1980.
