= September 1 =

September 1 this year in various calendars
- Tuesday, 1 September 2026
Akan	Monobene
Armenian	13 Hoṙi 1476
Aztec	Atemoztli 14, 1 Ehēcatl
Babylonian	18 Abu, 2337 SE
Balinese pawukon	Menga, Kajeng, Menala, Umanis, Maulu, Anggara of Uye, Yama, Gigis, Dewa
Bengali	17 Bhadro, BS 1433
Chinese	Yang Earth Tiger・Encampment Mansion; Fire Horse Year, Month 7, Day 20 (Chushu, 6 days until Bailu)
Common Era	1 September 2026 CE
Coptic	26 Mesori, AM 1742
Egyptian	18 Tybi, 2775 NE
Ethiopian	26 Naḥasē, 2018 Amätä Məhrät
French Republican	Décade II, Quintidi de Fructidor de l'Année 234 de la République
Gregorian	1 September, AD 2026
Hebrew	19 Elul, AM 5786
Hindu	Aśvinī・Gaṇḍa; Solar: 16 Bhādrapada, 1948 SE; Lunisolar: Caturthī, Kṛishna pakṣa of Śrāvaṇa, 2083 VE; Rāudra・5127 KY・1,872,819
Icelandic	Þriðjudagur, 8 Tvímánuður 2026
Islamic	18 Rabi' al-awwal, AH 1448 (using tabular method)
ISO week date	2026-W36-2
Japanese	20 Fumizuki, Reiwa 8 (Shosho, 6 days until Hakuro)
Julian	19 August, AD 2026 (AM 7534)
Julian day	2461285
Korean	20 Wonsungidal, 4359 DE
Maya	13.0.13.16.2; 15 Mol, 1 Ik
Roman	ante diem XIV Kalendas Septembres, MMDCCLXXIX AUC
Solar Hijri	10 Shahrivar, SH 1405
Tibetan	19 gro bzhin, me pho rta 2153 or 1772 or 1000

<<	September					>>
Su	Mo	Tu	We	Th	Fr	Sa
		1	2	3	4	5
6	7	8	9	10	11	12
13	14	15	16	17	18	19
20	21	22	23	24	25	26
27	28	29	30
2026

September 1 in recent years
2026 (Tuesday)
2025 (Monday)
2024 (Sunday)
2023 (Friday)
2022 (Thursday)
2021 (Wednesday)
2020 (Tuesday)
2019 (Sunday)
2018 (Saturday)
2017 (Friday)

September 1 is the 244th day of the year (245th in leap years) in the Gregorian calendar; 121 days remain until the end of the year.

== Events ==
=== Pre-1600 ===
- 396 BC – The Temple of Juno Regina (Aventine) is dedicated in Rome by Marcus Furius Camillus.
- 1057 – Byzantine general Isaak Komnenos is crowned Byzantine Emperor by patriarch Cerularius at the Hagia Sophia.
- 1145 – The main altar of Lund Cathedral, at the time the seat of the archiepiscopal see of all the Nordic countries, is consecrated.
- 1173 – The widow Stamira sacrifices herself in order to raise the siege of Ancona by the forces of Emperor Frederick Barbarossa.
- 1181 – Election of pope Lucius III following the death of pope Alexander III in the previous month.
- 1271 – Election of pope Gregory X following the death of Clement IV three years prior.
- 1355 – King Tvrtko I of Bosnia writes In castro nostro Vizoka vocatum from the Old town of Visoki.
- 1449 – Tumu Crisis: The Mongols capture the Emperor of China.
- 1529 – The Spanish fort of Sancti Spiritu, the first one built in modern Argentina, is destroyed by indigenous people.
- 1532 – Lady Anne Boleyn is made Marquess of Pembroke by her fiancé, King Henry VIII of England.

=== 1601–1900 ===
- 1604 – Adi Granth, now known as Guru Granth Sahib, the holy scripture of Sikhs, is first installed at Harmandir Sahib.
- 1610 – Claudio Monteverdi's musical work Vespro della Beata Vergine (Vespers for the Blessed Virgin) is first published, printed in Venice and dedicated to Pope Paul V.
- 1644 – Battle of Tippermuir: James Graham, 1st Marquess of Montrose defeats the Earl of Wemyss's Covenanters, reviving the Royalist cause.
- 1645 – English Civil War: Scottish Covenanter forces abandon their month-long Siege of Hereford, a Cavalier stronghold, on news of Royalist victories in Scotland.
- 1715 – At the age of five, Louis XV becomes king of France in succession to his great-grandfather, King Louis XIV.
- 1763 – Catherine the Great, Empress of Russia, endorses Ivan Betskoy's plans for a Foundling Home in Moscow.
- 1772 – The Mission San Luis Obispo de Tolosa is founded in San Luis Obispo, California.
- 1774 – Massachusetts Bay colonists rise up in the bloodless Powder Alarm.
- 1804 – 3 Juno, one of the largest asteroids in the Main Belt, is discovered by the German astronomer Karl Ludwig Harding.
- 1831 – The Order of St. Gregory the Great is established by Pope Gregory XVI of the Vatican State to recognize high support for the Vatican or for the Pope, by a man or a woman, and not necessarily a Roman Catholic.
- 1836 – Narcissa Whitman, one of the first English-speaking white women to settle west of the Rocky Mountains, arrives at Walla Walla, Washington.
- 1838 – Saint Andrew's Scots School, the oldest school of British origin in South America, is established.
- 1859 – Carrington Event started - the most intense geomagnetic storm in recorded history.
- 1862 – American Civil War: Confederate forces under General Stonewall Jackson inflict heavy casualties in the Battle of Chantilly during the Union withdrawal from the Northern Virginia campaign.
- 1864 – American Civil War: The Battle of Jonesborough, alongside the overall Atlanta campaign, culminates in a Union victory for General William T. Sherman as Confederate General John Bell Hood orders the evacuation of Atlanta.
- 1870 – Franco-Prussian War: The Battle of Sedan is fought, resulting in a decisive Prussian victory.
- 1873 – Cetshwayo ascends to the throne as king of the Zulu nation following the death of his father Mpande.
- 1878 – Emma Nutt becomes the world's first female telephone operator when she is recruited by Alexander Graham Bell to the Boston Telephone Dispatch Company.
- 1880 – The army of Mohammad Ayub Khan is routed by the British at the Battle of Kandahar, ending the Second Anglo-Afghan War.
- 1894 – Over 400 people die in the Great Hinckley Fire, a forest fire in Hinckley, Minnesota.
- 1897 – The Tremont Street Subway in Boston opens, becoming the first underground rapid transit system in North America.

=== 1901–present ===
- 1923 – The Great Kantō Earthquake devastates Tokyo and Yokohama, killing about 105,000 people.
- 1923 – Los Solidarios rob a branch of the Bank of Spain in Xixón, stealing more than half a million pesetas to fund the purchase of rifles to fight the coming 1923 Spanish coup d'état.
- 1939 – World War II: Germany and Slovakia invade Poland, beginning the European phase of World War II.
- 1939 – J. Robert Oppenheimer and his student Hartland Snyder publish the Oppenheimer–Snyder model, proving for the first time in contemporary physics how black holes could develop.
- 1944 – World War II: Launch of Operation Ratweek, complicating German retreat.
- 1961 – TWA Flight 529 crashes shortly after takeoff from Midway Airport in Chicago, killing all 78 people on board. At the time, it was the deadliest single plane disaster in U.S. history.
- 1967 – Six-Day War: The Khartoum Resolution is issued at the Arab Summit, and eight countries adopt the "three 'no's against Israel".
- 1969 – A coup in Libya brings Muammar Gaddafi to power.
- 1973 – A 76-hour multinational rescue effort in the Celtic Sea results in the rescue of Roger Mallinson and Roger Chapman.
- 1974 – The SR-71 Blackbird sets (and holds) the record for flying from New York to London in the time of one hour, 54 minutes and 56.4 seconds at a speed of 1,435.587 miles per hour (2,310.353 km/h).
- 1981 – Central African President David Dacko is ousted from power in a bloodless military coup led by General André Kolingba.
- 1982 – The United States Air Force Space Command is founded.
- 1983 – Cold War: Korean Air Lines Flight 007 is shot down by a Soviet jet fighter after the commercial aircraft strayed into Soviet airspace, killing all 269 on board, including Congressman Lawrence McDonald.
- 1985 – The wreck of the Titanic is discovered by an American-French expedition led by Robert Ballard and Jean-Louis Michel.
- 2004 – The Beslan school siege begins when armed terrorists take schoolchildren and school staff hostage in North Ossetia, Russia; by the end of the siege, three days later, more than 385 people are dead (including hostages, other civilians, security personnel and terrorists).
- 2008 – Iraq War: The United States Armed Forces transfers control of Anbar Province to the Iraqi Armed Forces.

== Births ==
=== Pre-1600 ===
- 948 – Jing Zong, emperor of the Liao Dynasty (died 982)
- 1145 – Ibn Jubayr, Arab geographer and poet (died 1217)
- 1288 – Elizabeth Richeza of Poland (died 1335)
- 1341 – Frederick III the Simple, King of Sicily (died 1377)
- 1453 – Gonzalo Fernández de Córdoba, Spanish general (died 1515)
- 1477 – Bartolomeo Fanfulla, Italian mercenary (died 1525)
- 1561 – Gervase Helwys, English murderer (died 1615)
- 1566 – Edward Alleyn, English actor and major figure of the Elizabethan theatre; founder of Dulwich College and Alleyn's School (died 1626)
- 1577 – Scipione Borghese, Italian cardinal and art collector (died 1633)
- 1579 – John Frederick of Holstein-Gottorp, Prince-Bishop, Roman Catholic archbishop (died 1634)
- 1588 – Henri, Prince of Condé (died 1646)
- 1592 – Maria Angela Astorch, Spanish mystic and saint (died 1665)

=== 1601–1900 ===
- 1606 – Nicholas Slanning, English politician (died 1643)
- 1608 – Giacomo Torelli, Italian stage designer, engineer, and architect (died 1678)
- 1647 – Princess Anna Sophie of Denmark, daughter of King Frederick III of Denmark (died 1717)
- 1653 – Johann Pachelbel, German organist, composer, and educator (died 1706)
- 1689 – Kilian Ignaz Dientzenhofer, Bohemian architect, designed Ss. Cyril and Methodius Cathedral (died 1751)
- 1711 – William IV, Prince of Orange (died 1751)
- 1726 – Johann Becker, German organist, composer, and educator (died 1803)
- 1795 – James Gordon Bennett Sr., American publisher, founded the New York Herald (died 1872)
- 1799 – Ferenc Gyulay, Hungarian-Austrian commander and politician (died 1868)
- 1811 – James Montgomrey, Leader and important benefactor of his home town of Brentford, England (died 1883)
- 1818 – José María Castro Madriz, Costa Rican lawyer and politician, 1st President of Costa Rica (died 1892)
- 1848 – Auguste Forel, Swiss myrmecologist, neuroanatomist, and psychiatrist (died 1931)
- 1849 – Emil Zuckerkandl, Hungarian anatomist (died 1910)
- 1850 – Jim O'Rourke, American baseball player and manager (died 1919)
- 1851 – John Clum, American journalist and agent (died 1932)
- 1853 – Aleksei Brusilov, Russian general (died 1926)
- 1854 – Engelbert Humperdinck, German playwright and composer (died 1921)
- 1855 – Innokenty Annensky, Russian poet and critic (died 1909)
- 1856 – Sergei Winogradsky, Ukrainian-Russian microbiologist and ecologist (died 1953)
- 1864 – Akashi Motojiro, Japanese general (died 1919)
- 1866 – James J. Corbett, American boxer (died 1933)
- 1867 – John Gretton, 1st Baron Gretton, English sailor and politician (died 1947)
- 1868 – Henri Bourassa, Canadian publisher and politician (died 1952)
- 1869 – Frank Elbridge Webb, American engineer and presidential candidate (died 1949)
- 1871 – J. Reuben Clark, American lawyer, civil servant, and religious leader (died 1961)
- 1873 – João Ferreira Sardo the founder of Gafanha da Nazaré (died 1925)
- 1875 – Edgar Rice Burroughs, American author (died 1950)
- 1876 – Harriet Shaw Weaver, English journalist and activist (died 1961)
- 1877 – Francis William Aston, English chemist and physicist, Nobel Prize laureate (died 1945)
- 1877 – Rex Beach, American author, playwright, and water polo player (died 1949)
- 1878 – Princess Alexandra of Saxe-Coburg and Gotha (died 1942)
- 1878 – J. F. C. Fuller, English general and historian (died 1966)
- 1878 – Tullio Serafin, Italian conductor and director (died 1968)
- 1883 – Didier Pitre, Canadian ice hockey player (died 1934)
- 1884 – Hilda Rix Nicholas, Australian artist (died 1961)
- 1884 – Sigurd Wallén, Swedish actor and director (died 1947)
- 1886 – Othmar Schoeck, Swiss composer and conductor (died 1957)
- 1886 – Shigeyasu Suzuki, Japanese general (died 1957)
- 1887 – Blaise Cendrars, Swiss author and poet (died 1961)
- 1888 – Andrija Štampar, Croatian physician (died 1958)
- 1892 – Leverett Saltonstall, American lieutenant and politician, 55th Governor of Massachusetts (died 1979)
- 1893 – Yasuo Kuniyoshi, Japanese-American painter and photographer (died 1953)
- 1895 – Engelbert Zaschka, German engineer and designer, invented the Human-powered aircraft (died 1955)
- 1896 – A. C. Bhaktivedanta Swami Prabhupada, Indian religious leader, founded the International Society for Krishna Consciousness (died 1977)
- 1897 – Andy Kennedy, Irish footballer (died 1963)
- 1898 – Violet Carson, English actress and singer (died 1983)
- 1899 – Richard Arlen, American actor (died 1976)

=== 1901–present ===
- 1902 – Kazimierz Dąbrowski, Polish psychiatrist and psychologist (died 1980)
- 1904 – Johnny Mack Brown, American football player and actor (died 1974)
- 1905 – Father Chrysanthus, Dutch arachnologist (died 1972)
- 1906 – Joaquín Balaguer, Dominican lawyer and politician, 49th President of the Dominican Republic (died 2002)
- 1906 – Eleanor Alice Burford (Jean Plaidy), English author (died 1993)
- 1907 – Walter Reuther, American labor union leader and president of the United Auto Workers (died 1970)
- 1908 – Amir Elahi, Pakistani cricketer (died 1980)
- 1908 – Lou Kenton, English social activist (died 2012)
- 1909 – E. Herbert Norman, Canadian historian and diplomat (died 1957)
- 1913 – Ludwig Merwart, Austrian painter and illustrator (died 1979)
- 1914 – John H. Adams, American jockey (died 1995)
- 1916 – Dorothy Cheney, American tennis player (died 2014)
- 1919 – Ossie Dawson, South African cricketer (died 2008)
- 1919 – Hilda Hänchen, German physicist and academic (died 2013)
- 1920 – Richard Farnsworth, American actor and stuntman (died 2000)
- 1921 – Willem Frederik Hermans, Dutch author, poet and playwright (died 1995)
- 1922 – Yvonne De Carlo, Canadian-American actress and singer (died 2007)
- 1922 – Vittorio Gassman, Italian actor, director and screenwriter (died 2000)
- 1923 – Rocky Marciano, American boxer (died 1969)
- 1923 – Kenneth Thomson, 2nd Baron Thomson of Fleet, Canadian businessman and art collector (died 2006)
- 1925 – Art Pepper, American saxophonist, clarinet player and composer (died 1982)
- 1926 – Abdur Rahman Biswas, Bangladeshi banker and politician, 10th President of Bangladesh (died 2017)
- 1926 – Gene Colan, American illustrator (died 2011)
- 1927 – Soshana Afroyim, Austrian painter (died 2015)
- 1928 – George Maharis, American actor, singer, and artist (died 2023)
- 1929 – Mava Lee Thomas, American baseball player (died 2013)
- 1929 – Maurice Vachon, Canadian wrestler (died 2013)
- 1930 – Turgut Özakman, Turkish lawyer and civil servant (died 2013)
- 1930 – Charles Correa, Indian architect (died 2015)
- 1931 – Abdul Haq Ansari, Indian theologian and scholar (died 2012)
- 1931 – Cecil Parkinson, English accountant and politician, Secretary of State for Transport (died 2016)
- 1931 – Boxcar Willie, American singer-songwriter and guitarist (died 1999)
- 1932 – Derog Gioura, Nauruan politician, 23rd President of Nauru (died 2008)
- 1933 – Ann Richards, American educator and politician, 45th Governor of Texas (died 2006)
- 1933 – Conway Twitty, American singer-songwriter and guitarist (died 1993)
- 1935 – Seiji Ozawa, Japanese conductor and director (died 2024)
- 1935 – Guy Rodgers, American basketball player (died 2001)
- 1936 – Valery Legasov, Soviet inorganic chemist, chief of the commission investigating the Chernobyl disaster (died 1988)
- 1937 – Francisco Pinto Balsemão, Portuguese politician, Prime Minister of Portugal (died 2025)
- 1938 – Jodie Allen, American journalist, author, and editor (died 2026)
- 1938 – Alan Dershowitz, American lawyer and author
- 1938 – Per Kirkeby, Danish painter, sculptor and poet (died 2018)
- 1939 – Rico Carty, Dominican baseball player (died 2024)
- 1939 – Lily Tomlin, American actress, comedian, screenwriter and producer
- 1940 – Yaşar Büyükanıt, Turkish general (died 2019)
- 1940 – Annie Ernaux, French author, Nobel Prize laureate
- 1942 – C. J. Cherryh, American author and educator
- 1943 – Don Stroud, American actor
- 1944 – Archie Bell, American soul singer-songwriter and musician
- 1944 – Leonard Slatkin, American conductor and composer
- 1945 – Abd Rabbuh Mansur Hadi, Yemeni general and politician, 2nd President of Yemen (died 2026)
- 1946 – Barry Gibb, Manx-English singer-songwriter and producer
- 1946 – Shalom Hanoch, Israeli rock singer, lyricist and composer
- 1946 – Roh Moo-hyun, South Korean soldier and politician, 9th President of South Korea (died 2009)
- 1947 – Al Green, American lawyer and politician
- 1947 – P. A. Sangma, Indian lawyer and politician, 11th Speaker of the Lok Sabha (died 2016)
- 1948 – Greg Errico, American drummer and producer
- 1948 – Józef Życiński, Polish archbishop and philosopher (died 2011)
- 1950 – Mikhail Fradkov, Russian politician, 36th Prime Minister of Russia
- 1950 – Phil McGraw, American psychologist, author and talk show host
- 1951 – Timothy Zahn, American Hugo Award-winning sci-fi and fantasy author
- 1952 – Michael Massee, American actor (died 2016)
- 1952 – Juan Cruz Martínez, Mexican politician (died 2026)
- 1955 – Bruce Foxton, English singer-songwriter and bass player
- 1956 – Vinnie Johnson, American basketball player and sportscaster
- 1956 – Bernie Wagenblast, transportation journalist, founder of Transportation Communications Newsletter
- 1957 – Alexandra Aikhenvald, Australian linguist
- 1957 – Gloria Estefan, Cuban-American singer-songwriter and actress
- 1957 – Duško Ivanović, Montenegrin basketball player and coach
- 1960 – Eric Adams, American police officer, and politician (Mayor of New York)
- 1960 – Ralf Außem, German footballer and manager
- 1961 – Jeremy Farrar, British academic and educator; director of the Wellcome Trust
- 1961 – Christopher Ferguson, American captain, pilot and astronaut
- 1961 – Boney James, American saxophonist, composer and producer
- 1962 – Tony Cascarino, English-Irish footballer
- 1962 – Ruud Gullit, Dutch footballer and manager
- 1963 – Stephen Kernahan, Australian footballer
- 1963 – Grant-Lee Phillips, American musician and actor
- 1964 – Brian Bellows, Canadian ice hockey player
- 1964 – Charlie Robison, American singer-songwriter and guitarist (died 2023)
- 1965 – Craig McLachlan, Australian actor and singer
- 1965 – Tibor Simon, Hungarian footballer and manager (died 2002)
- 1966 – Tim Hardaway, American basketball player and coach
- 1967 – Steve Pemberton, English actor, screenwriter and director
- 1968 – Mohamed Atta, Egyptian terrorist (died 2001)
- 1969 – Henning Berg, Norwegian footballer and manager
- 1970 – David Fairleigh, Australian rugby league player and coach
- 1970 – Hwang Jung-min, South Korean actor
- 1970 – Padma Lakshmi, Indian-American actress and author
- 1971 – Ricardo Antonio Chavira, American actor
- 1971 – Yoshitaka Hirota, Japanese bass player and composer
- 1971 – Maury Sterling, American actor
- 1971 – Hakan Şükür, Turkish footballer and politician
- 1971 – Rachel Zoe, American fashion designer
- 1973 – J.D. Fortune, Canadian singer-songwriter
- 1973 – Simon Shaw, English rugby player
- 1973 – Ram Kapoor, Indian actor
- 1974 – Burn Gorman, American-born English actor and musician
- 1974 – Jason Taylor, American football player and sportscaster
- 1974 – Yutaka Yamamoto, Japanese director and producer, founder of Ordet Animation Studio
- 1974 – Jhonen Vasquez, American writer, director, cartoonist and comic illustrator
- 1975 – Natalie Bassingthwaighte, Australian singer-songwriter
- 1975 – Ammon Bundy, American anti-government militant
- 1975 – Cuttino Mobley, American basketball player
- 1975 – Scott Speedman, English-Canadian actor
- 1976 – Babydaddy, American singer-songwriter and producer
- 1976 – Marcos Ambrose, Australian racing driver
- 1976 – Clare Connor, English cricketer
- 1976 – Érik Morales, Mexican boxer
- 1976 – Sebastián Rozental, Chilean footballer
- 1977 – David Albelda, Spanish footballer
- 1977 – Raffaele Giammaria, Italian racing driver
- 1977 – Arsalan Iftikhar, American lawyer and author
- 1977 – Aaron Schobel, American football player
- 1978 – Max Vieri, Australian-Italian footballer
- 1980 – Sammy Adjei, Ghanaian footballer
- 1980 – Chris Riggott, English footballer
- 1981 – Boyd Holbrook, American actor
- 1981 – Clinton Portis, American football player
- 1981 – Adam Quick, Australian basketball player
- 1982 – Jeffrey Buttle, Canadian figure skater
- 1982 – Paul Dumbrell, Australian racing driver
- 1982 – Ryan Gomes, American basketball player
- 1982 – Zoe Lister-Jones, American actress and director
- 1983 – Cameron Borgas, Australian cricketer
- 1983 – Iñaki Lejarreta, Spanish cyclist (died 2012)
- 1983 – José Antonio Reyes, Spanish footballer (died 2019)
- 1983 – Jeff Woywitka, Canadian ice hockey player
- 1984 – Ludwig Göransson, Swedish film composer
- 1984 – László Köteles, Hungarian footballer
- 1984 – Rod Pelley, Canadian ice hockey player
- 1984 – Joe Trohman, American singer-songwriter, guitarist and producer
- 1985 – Larsen Jensen, American swimmer
- 1986 – Anthony Allen, English rugby player
- 1986 – Gaël Monfils, French tennis player
- 1986 – Stella Mwangi, Kenyan-Norwegian singer-songwriter
- 1987 – Leonel Suárez, Cuban decathlete
- 1987 – Mats Zuccarello, Norwegian ice hockey player
- 1988 – Simona de Silvestro, Swiss racing driver
- 1988 – Miles Plumlee, American basketball player
- 1988 – Chanel West Coast, American rapper-songwriter and model
- 1989 – Astrid Besser, Italian tennis player
- 1989 – Bill Kaulitz, German singer and songwriter
- 1989 – Jefferson Montero, Ecuadorian footballer
- 1989 – Gustav Nyquist, Swedish ice hockey player
- 1989 – Daniel Sturridge, English footballer
- 1990 – Aisling Loftus, English actress
- 1990 – Stanislav Tecl, Czech footballer
- 1991 – Rhys Bennett, English footballer
- 1992 – Cristiano Biraghi, Italian footballer
- 1992 – Kirani James, Grenadian sprinter
- 1992 – Tomáš Nosek, Czech ice hockey player
- 1992 – Woo Hye-lim, South Korean singer-songwriter
- 1993 – Mario Lemina, Gabonese footballer
- 1994 – Anna Smolina, Russian tennis player
- 1994 – Carlos Sainz Jr., Spanish racing driver
- 1995 – Nathan MacKinnon, Canadian ice hockey player
- 1996 – Zendaya, American actress and singer
- 1997 – Jeon Jungkook, South Korean singer, songwriter and record producer
- 1997 – Joan Mir, Spanish motorcycle racer
- 1998 – Josh Battle, Australian rules footballer
- 1998 – Josh Okogie, Nigerian-American basketball player
- 1998 – Salah Mohsen, Egyptian footballer
- 1999 – Cam Reddish, American basketball player
- 2000 – Mikhail Iakovlev, Israeli Olympic cyclist
- 2000 – Pratika Rawal, Indian cricketer
- 2002 – Diane Parry, French tennis player
- 2002 – Illia Zabarnyi, Ukrainian footballer
- 2003 – An Yu-jin, South Korean singer and actress

== Deaths ==
=== Pre-1600 ===
- 870 – Muhammad al-Bukhari, Persian scholar (born 810)
- 873 – Thachulf, duke of Thuringia
- 1081 – Bishop Eusebius of Angers
- 1159 – Pope Adrian IV (born 1100)
- 1198 – Dulce, Queen of Portugal (born 1160)
- 1215 – Otto, bishop of Utrecht
- 1256 – Kujō Yoritsune, Japanese shōgun (born 1218)
- 1327 – Foulques de Villaret, Grand Master of the Knights Hospitaller
- 1339 – Henry XIV, Duke of Bavaria (born 1305)
- 1375 – Philip of Valois, Duke of Orléans (born 1336)
- 1414 – William de Ros, 6th Baron de Ros, English politician, Lord High Treasurer (born 1369)
- 1480 – Ulrich V, Count of Württemberg (born 1413)
- 1557 – Jacques Cartier, French navigator and explorer (born 1491)
- 1581 – Guru Ram Das, Sikh 4th of the Ten Gurus of Sikhism (born 1534)
- 1599 – Cornelis de Houtman, Dutch explorer (born 1565)

=== 1601–1900 ===
- 1615 – Étienne Pasquier, French lawyer and jurist (born 1529)
- 1646 – Francis Windebank, English statesman (born 1582)
- 1648 – Marin Mersenne, French mathematician, theologian, and philosopher (born 1588)
- 1678 – Jan Brueghel the Younger, Flemish painter (born 1601)
- 1685 – Leoline Jenkins, Welsh lawyer, jurist, and politician, Secretary of State for the Northern Department (born 1625)
- 1687 – Henry More, English priest and philosopher (born 1614)
- 1706 – Cornelis de Man, Dutch painter (born 1621)
- 1715 – François Girardon, French sculptor (born 1628)
- 1715 – Louis XIV of France (born 1638)
- 1838 – William Clark, American soldier, explorer, and politician, 4th Governor of Missouri Territory (born 1770)
- 1839 – Izidor Guzmics, Hungarian theologian and educator (born 1786)
- 1868 – Ferenc Gyulay, Hungarian-Austrian commander and politician (born 1799)

=== 1901–present ===
- 1914 – Martha, last known passenger pigeon (hatched 1885)
- 1922 – Samu Pecz, Hungarian architect and academic (born 1854)
- 1924 – Noe Khomeriki, Georgian Social Democrat politician (born 1883)
- 1930 – Peeter Põld, Estonian scientist and politician, 1st Estonian Minister of Education (born 1878)
- 1943 – Charles Atangana, Cameroonian ruler (born 1880)
- 1947 – Frederick Russell Burnham, American soldier and adventurer (born 1861)
- 1951 – Nellie McClung, Canadian author and suffragist (born 1873)
- 1967 – Siegfried Sassoon, English soldier and writer (born 1886)
- 1969 – Drew Pearson, American journalist and author (born 1897)
- 1970 – François Mauriac, French novelist, poet, and playwright, Nobel Prize laureate (born 1885)
- 1971 – Alan Brown, English soldier (born 1909)
- 1974 – Gerd Neggo, Estonian dancer, dance teacher, and choreographer (born 1891)
- 1977 – Ethel Waters, American singer and actress (born 1896)
- 1981 – Ann Harding, American actress (born 1901)
- 1981 – Albert Speer, German architect and author (born 1905)
- 1982 – Haskell Curry, American mathematician and academic (born 1900)
- 1982 – Władysław Gomułka, Polish activist and politician (born 1905)
- 1982 – Isabel Cristina Mrad Campos, Brazilian student; honored by the Catholicism (born 1962)
- 1983 – Henry M. Jackson, American lawyer and politician (born 1912)
- 1983 – Larry McDonald, American physician and politician (born 1935)
- 1984 – Madeleine de Bourbon-Busset, Duchess of Parma (born 1898)
- 1985 – Stefan Bellof, German racing driver (born 1957)
- 1986 – Murray Hamilton, American actor (born 1923)
- 1988 – Luis Walter Alvarez, American physicist and academic, Nobel Prize laureate (born 1911)
- 1989 – A. Bartlett Giamatti, American businessman and academic (born 1938)
- 1989 – Kazimierz Deyna, Polish footballer (born 1947)
- 1989 – Tadeusz Sendzimir, Polish-American engineer (born 1894)
- 1990 – Edwin O. Reischauer, American scholar and diplomat (born 1910)
- 1991 – Otl Aicher, German graphic designer and typographer (born 1922)
- 1997 – Zoltán Czibor, Hungarian footballer (born 1929)
- 1998 – Józef Krupiński, Polish poet and author (born 1930)
- 1998 – Cary Middlecoff, American golfer and sportscaster (born 1921)
- 1998 – Osman F. Seden, Turkish director, producer, and screenwriter (born 1924)
- 1999 – W. Richard Stevens, Zambian computer scientist and author (born 1951)
- 2003 – Rand Brooks, American actor and producer (born 1918)
- 2003 – Terry Frost, English painter and academic (born 1915)
- 2004 – Ahmed Kuftaro, Syrian religious leader, Grand Mufti of Syria (born 1915)
- 2004 – Alastair Morton, South African businessman (born 1938)
- 2005 – R. L. Burnside, American singer-songwriter and guitarist (born 1926)
- 2006 – György Faludy, Hungarian author and poet (born 1910)
- 2006 – Warren Mitofsky, American journalist (born 1934)
- 2006 – Bob O'Connor, American businessman and politician, 57th Mayor of Pittsburgh (born 1944)
- 2006 – Kyffin Williams, Welsh painter and educator (born 1918)
- 2007 – Roy McKenzie, New Zealand horse racer and philanthropist (born 1922)
- 2008 – Thomas J. Bata, Czech-Canadian businessman (born 1914)
- 2008 – Jerry Reed, American singer-songwriter, guitarist, and actor (born 1937)
- 2010 – Wakanohana Kanji I, Japanese sumo wrestler, the 45th Yokozuna (born 1928)
- 2012 – Sean Bergin, South African saxophonist, flute player, and composer (born 1948)
- 2012 – Hal David, American songwriter and composer (born 1921)
- 2012 – Smarck Michel, Haitian businessman and politician, 6th Prime Minister of Haiti (born 1937)
- 2012 – William Petzäll, Swedish politician (born 1988)
- 2012 – Arnaldo Putzu, Italian illustrator (born 1927)
- 2013 – Ignacio Eizaguirre, Spanish footballer and manager (born 1920)
- 2013 – Tommy Morrison, American boxer and actor (born 1969)
- 2013 – Gordon Steege, Australian soldier (born 1917)
- 2013 – Margaret Mary Vojtko, American linguist and academic (born 1930)
- 2013 – Ken Wallis, English commander and pilot (born 1916)
- 2014 – Ahmed Abdi Godane, Somali militant leader (born 1977)
- 2014 – Roger McKee, American baseball player (born 1926)
- 2014 – Joseph Shivers, American chemist and academic, developed spandex (born 1920)
- 2015 – Gurgen Dalibaltayan, Armenian general (born 1926)
- 2015 – Dean Jones, American actor and singer (born 1931)
- 2015 – Richard G. Hewlett, American historian and author (born 1923)
- 2015 – Ben Kuroki, American sergeant and pilot (born 1917)
- 2018 – Randy Weston, American jazz pianist and composer (born 1926)
- 2020 – Erick Morillo, American disc jockey and music producer (born 1971)
- 2022 – Barbara Ehrenreich, American writer and journalist (born 1941)
- 2022 – Yang Yongsong, Chinese major general (born 1919)
- 2023 – Jimmy Buffett, American singer-songwriter, musician, author and businessman (born 1946)
- 2024 – Linda Deutsch, American journalist (born 1943)
- 2025 – Joe Bugner, Hungarian-British boxer and actor (born 1950)
- 2026 – Carla Jeffery, American actor and singer (born 1993)

== Holidays and observances ==
- Feast of Creation (Christianity)
- Christian feast day:
  - Constantius (Costanzo) of Aquino
  - David Pendleton Oakerhater (Anglican Communion)
  - Giles
  - Blessed Giuliana of Collalto
  - Isabel Cristina
  - Loup (Lupus) of Sens
  - Nivard (Nivo)
  - Sixtus of Reims
  - Terentian (Terrence)
  - Verena
  - Vibiana
  - The beginning of the new liturgical year (Eastern Orthodox Church and the Eastern Catholic Church) and Creationtide
  - September 1 (Eastern Orthodox liturgics)
- Knowledge Day (Former Soviet Union)
- Anniversary of Al Fateh Revolution (Gaddafists in Libya)
- Wattle Day (Australia)
