= Pete Tauriello =

Pete Tauriello is a veteran traffic anchor on 1010 WINS, WKXW and several other radio stations in the New York City area including a few years on the Z-100 "Morning Zoo." He has also served as a traffic reporter on WWOR-TV and more recently on WNBC-TV's "Today In New York."

Tauriello graduated from Seton Hall University in South Orange, New Jersey, where he was active on the college's radio station, WSOU-FM. He holds a B.A. in Communication Arts.

As an alumnus of WSOU, he was recognized for his achievements and service when he was voted into the WSOU Hall of Fame. He also received the NY Achievement in Radio Award 2 consecutive years. One for best air talent and the second for best traffic reporter.

Prior to joining Shadow Traffic in 1982, he served as the morning host on WADB in Point Pleasant, New Jersey (1976–78). Later he went on to program WBRW in Somerville, New Jersey, and WERA in Plainfield, New Jersey (as Peter Jaye) with announcer stints at beautiful music WPAT-FM, WNSR New York and WFAS/WFAS-FM White Plains.

Pete spent 12 years at WEVD New York as a pop standards DJ on the "Saturday Morning 1050 Club" and later became "The Pragmatic Talk Host" when the station dropped standards for talk. His position was that he refused be identified as being liberal, conservative or anything else. "I'm a pragmatist!", he would say, "What works ... works. Why must any good thought or work come from one party or the other ... one ideology or the other?"

During his more than 31 years at the Shadow Traffic Network New York, Tauriello served as both an assistant program director and program director having hired and/or trained some of market one's most well-known traffic reporters including Debbie Mazella, Tom Note and many others. His expertise is in talent development and radio programming for talk/AC hybrids.

Pete was a weekend disc jockey on oldies formatted WMTR in Morristown for three and a half years until the station dismissed most of its air personalities in favor of a satellite delivered format. For 30 years he was the morning traffic anchor on 1010 WINS Radio in New York.

Pete's voice can be heard in the motion picture "No Reservations" and in numerous documentaries about the September 11 attack on the World Trade Center as well as several radio commercials.

When not reporting traffic he can also be found behind the microphone singing, along with his wife of 45 years, Maureen Conroy Tauriello, at various churches in northern New Jersey. He also served as a professional cantor at St. Benedict's Church in Newark, N.J. under the direction of well-known musician and choir director Philip Mealy. He currently is a member of the music ministry at St. Francis of Assisi American National Catholic Church in Glen Ridge NJ.

A born radio enthusiast, he is also an amateur radio operator and is a former vice president of the Tri County Radio Association of Union. He also serves as an adviser to the Drew University radio station, WMNJ Madison, New Jersey. His younger son, Mark, had been the station's general manager for 3 years and is credited with bringing the small station back from sporadic operation to full-time operation with automation and live student programming. The younger Tauriello also envisioned and led the station's move into Internet broadcasting.

Most recently he has begun co-hosting the Sonic Boomers podcast along with his wife, Maureen. Together they discuss a variety of topics each week. The audio only version can be heard on all major platforms and now they have added a video version available on youtube.com and facebook.

The Tauriellos have been married since 1976 and have 3 children and 2 grandchildren.
