= WFAS =

WFAS may refer to:

- WVBN (FM), a radio station (103.9 FM) licensed to serve Bronxville, New York, which held the call sign WFAS-FM in three separate periods
- WFAS (AM), a defunct radio station (1230 AM) licensed to serve White Plains, New York, United States, from 1926 to 2024
- Windows Firewall with Advanced Security
