= Zaschka =

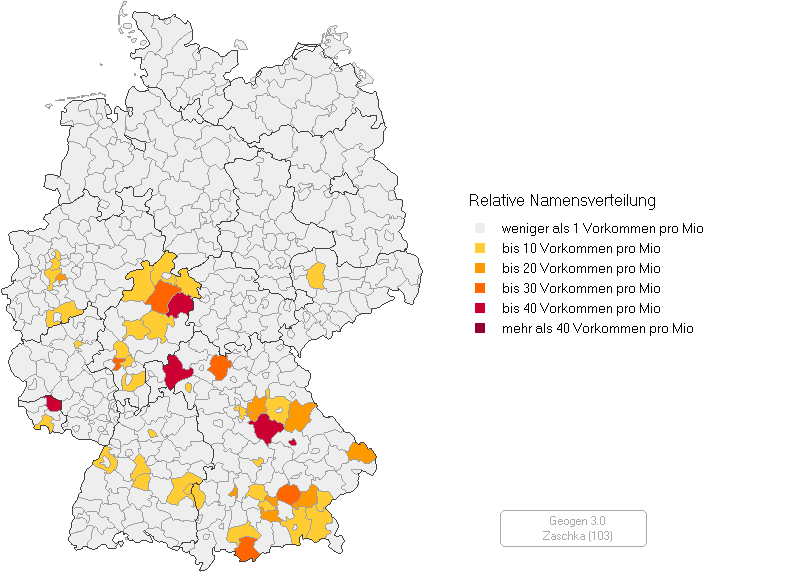
The distribution of Zaschka in Germany

Zaschka is a German habitational surname for someone from Zatzschke and can refer to:

- Engelbert Zaschka (1895–1955), a German chief engineer, chief designer, inventor and helicopter pioneer
- Milly Zaschka (d. 1975), a German singer of operas, actor and stage director
