= Guzmics =

Guzmics is a surname. Notable people with the surname include:

- Izidor Guzmics (1786–1839), Hungarian theologian
- Richárd Guzmics (born 1987), Hungarian footballer
