= Global Traffic Network =

Global Traffic Network is a traffic reporting service that provides reports to radio and television stations across Australia, Canada, Brazil and the United Kingdom. The company was formed in 2005 by principals from Westwood One and Metro Networks, both of which provide direct traffic and news programming to their affiliate stations in the U.S.

Global Traffic Network also has five subsidiaries, Canadian Traffic Network, Australian Traffic Network, Global Traffic Network UK, United States Traffic Network and the Brazilian Traffic Network.

Global Traffic Network was established to be a worldwide aviation company providing helicopter traffic and news reports on the radio and television. It is the leading vendor for radio traffic reports in Canada and Australia.

Global Traffic Network is also attempting to expand its market reach in the televised media through its Australian subsidiary. Combined with the radio affiliates, Global is the dominant ENG helicopter vendor in Australia.

Global Traffic's media reach, as a helicopter company, is the largest in the world, an idea first hatched by vendors of Metro Networks in 1999.

== History ==
Global Traffic Network was incorporated in Delaware in May 2005 by William L. Yde, III, who had sold a traffic company to billionaire David I Saperstein, the former CEO of Metro Networks, in 1996.

Yde, who had been living in Las Vegas, Nevada assembled a management group from within Metro Networks and Westwood One, including Shane Coppola, Westwood's CEO, and Gary Worobow, who was Westwood One's general counsel.

Yde united four helicopter traffic companies that had been operating in Australia, Canada and Europe. Those four helicopter companies are now subsidiaries of the parent, Global Traffic Network.

Although Global Traffic Network was originally established to serve only the Canadian provinces, Australia and Europe, the company signed advertising and broadcast management agreements with Westwood One and Metro Networks in November 2005, essentially making Global Traffic Network the aviation arm of Westwood and Metro.

Global Traffic Network now owns dozens of Robinson R44 helicopters to service affiliate contracts in the US, Canada, Australia and Europe, according to the 2007 Rotor Roster, a helicopter industry publication that reports annually on the ownership and registration of rotorcraft.

In December 2016 Global Traffic Network acquired the assets of Radiate Media, a US provider of traffic reports for American radio and television stations. Radiate Media was renamed US Traffic Network (USTN).

== Capitalization and investment ==
In November 2005, Metro Networks, which is a subsidiary of Westwood One, extended a $2-million dollar loan to Global Traffic Network in order to help capitalize the company, according to financial records filed by Global Traffic Network with the U.S. Securities and Exchange Commission (SEC.

Global Traffic Network then began the process of an initial public offering, and in March 2006 the company went public on the NASDAQ Exchange under the stock symbol GNET. Only three months later, Westwood One bought 1,540,000 shares of GNET on behalf of Metro Networks, essentially giving the companies a 10 percent ownership stake in Global Traffic Network.

== Management ==
Global Traffic Network is operated by some of the same principals who once ran Metro Networks, and later were in charge of Westwood One. Among the field of executives are William Yde, III, who serves as chairman and CEO of Global Traffic Network, Gary Worobow, former general counsel and director of Metro Networks and former general counsel of Westwood One, who serves as executive vice president, business and legal affairs. Scott Cody, who also was with Metro Networks and Westwood One, is the chief financial officer for Global Traffic Network, as well, and was among the first executives to move from Westwood to Global Traffic Network in 2005.

== Network offices ==
Global Traffic Network operates in Australia, Canada, Brazil, the United States and the United Kingdom.

Their Canadian broadcast centers are located in Toronto and Hamilton, Ontario. Calgary and Edmonton, Alberta. Montreal, Quebec. Vancouver, British Columbia and Winnipeg, Manitoba.

Their Australian broadcast centres are located in all major Australian capital cities. Sydney, Melbourne, Brisbane, Adelaide and Perth.

Their US headquarters is in Malvern, Pennsylvania. The main sales office is located in Chicago, Illinois along with an operations center. Another major hub is located in Dallas, Texas.

== Future ==
While the company originally intended to operate only in Canada, sales and broadcast agreements with its investment companies, Westwood and Metro, have given Global a substantial penetration into the U.S. radio market, according to Hoovers Business.

In April 2009, Mobile Traffic Network, a wholly owned subsidiary of Global Traffic Network was formed to create a new proprietary and mobile alerting system capable of sending 'hands-free' audio alerts to all mobile phones based on subscriber location and traffic incident zone determination and will be distributed FREE to consumer as an ad-supported application.
