= Bernie Wagenblast =

American journalist and voice-over artist

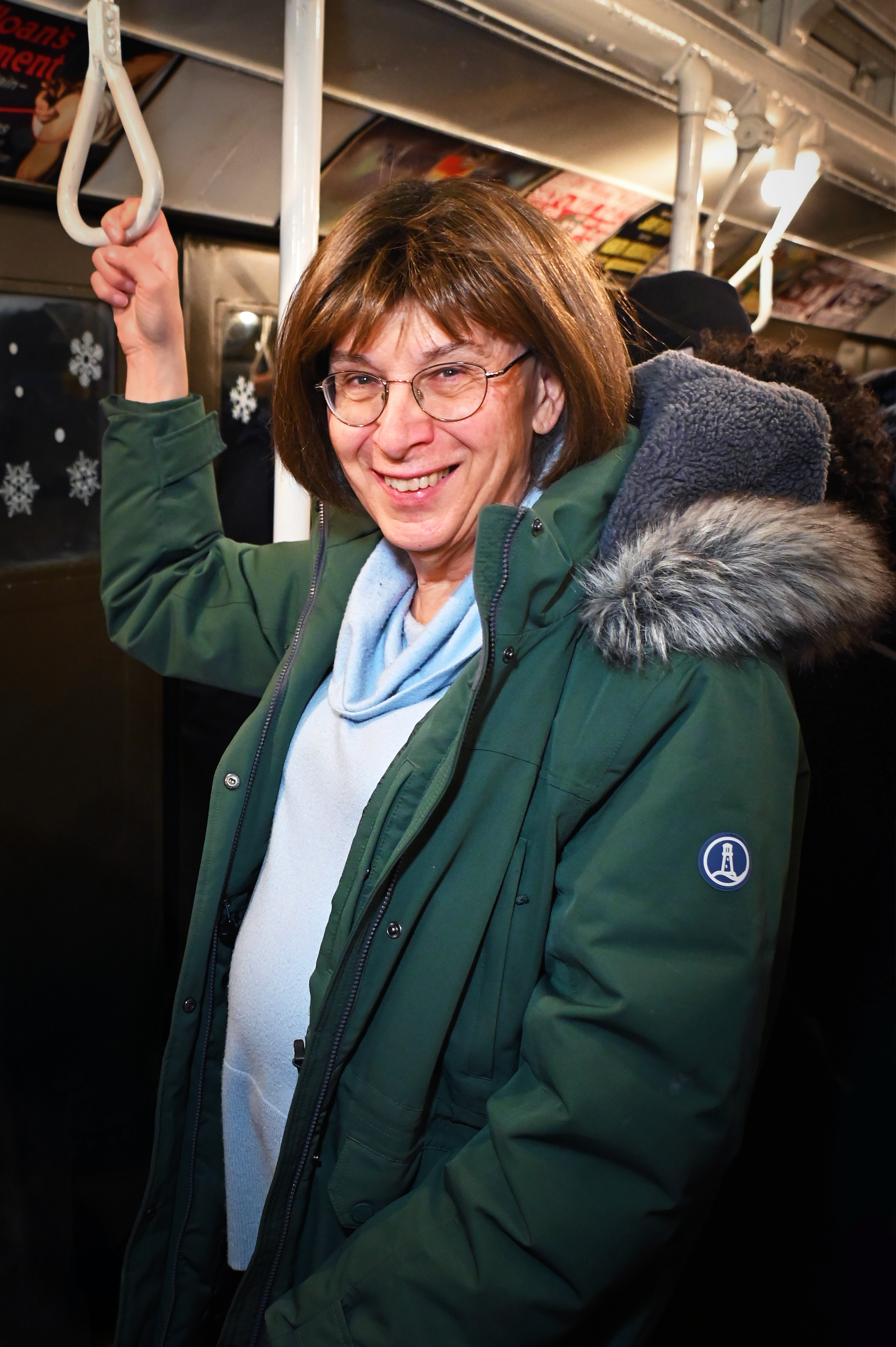
- Wagenblast in 2025
- Born: September 1, 1956 (age 70); Elizabeth, New Jersey
- Occupations: Transportation journalist, radio personality and voice-over artist
- Years active: 1976-present

Bernadette Wagenblast (born September 1, 1956) is an American transportation journalist, radio personality and voice-over artist. She is the founder and editor of the Transportation Communications Newsletter. The newsletter originated as a discussion group in June 1998, evolving into its current format shortly thereafter. She also edits the AASHTO Daily Transportation Update, published by the American Association of State Highway and Transportation Officials, and hosts The Stream by AASHTO podcast and the ITE Talks Transportation podcast for the Institute of Transportation Engineers. She is known as the voice of automated announcements on the New York City Subway.

== Early life ==
Wagenblast grew up and has spent most of her life in Cranford, New Jersey where she attended Cranford High School. She went on to graduate from Seton Hall University where she was active in the college's radio station, WSOU (South Orange, NJ), serving as the news director there in 1976–1977, and station manager in 1977–1978. In 2016 she was inducted into WSOU's Hall of Fame.

== Career ==
Wagenblast is the founder and editor of the Transportation Communications Newsletter. She also has served as the voice for various transportation facilities including AirTrain Newark, AirTrain JFK, New York City Subway, and the travelers' information station system at Newark Liberty International Airport and John F. Kennedy International Airport. As of May 28, 2015, she can be heard as the voice on the refurbished cars running on the PATCO Speedline. She is the voice of the PATH customer information line as well as the main phone number for the Port Authority of New York and New Jersey. On July 4, 2004, she was the announcer during the laying of the cornerstone of One World Trade Center at the World Trade Center site.

Wagenblast was a traffic reporter for the New York City office of Shadow Traffic/Metro Networks (a Westwood One company), where she began her career in the transportation field in 1979 as one of that company's original on-air reporters. Through her work for Shadow, she appeared on several New York City radio stations over a five-year period, including WINS and WABC. On WABC she used the name Jack Packard, which was given to her by the station's morning DJ Dan Ingram when Wagenblast began airing traffic reports on the station in December 1979. The name was based on a character from the old time radio program "I Love a Mystery". In addition to New York City, Wagenblast also appeared on suburban stations WBAB, WERA, WMTR, WNAB, WVIP, and WWDJ.

Other broadcast experience included positions at WHN (New York City), WJDM (Elizabeth, NJ), WDGS (New Albany, IN) and WRNJ (Hackettstown, NJ).

After working for Shadow Traffic the first time, Wagenblast joined the New York City Department of Transportation, where she helped to establish the city's first transportation communications center. Afterward, she moved to the Port Authority of New York and New Jersey and was operations manager at TRANSCOM, a coalition of transportation agencies in New York, New Jersey and Connecticut, from 1986 until 1996. She also was involved in the start of the I-95 Corridor Coalition, serving as co-chair of the Highway Operations Group.

Following over a decade of work in government, Wagenblast rejoined the private sector serving as the NYC Director of Operations for SmartRoute Systems, a Senior Associate for TransCore and working with SmartRoute Systems to help grow their public sector Intelligent Transportation Systems business.

Wagenblast returned to WINS in April 2008, doing traffic reports in the early afternoon hours. She called her 23-year absence from the station a "lunch break" and one of the longest absences in the history of the New York media market. In addition, she was heard on WKXW and WRCN-FM. She worked for Total Traffic in Rutherford, New Jersey.

In 2024, she appeared as the voice of the subway conductor on the album Warriors by Lin-Manuel Miranda and Eisa Davis. In 2025 she made her off-Broadway debut voicing the train conductor in Dylan Mulvaney's The Least Problematic Woman in the World. On January 1, 2026, she served as the announcer for the public inauguration of Zohran Mamdani.

=== Cranford Radio ===
A longtime Cranford, New Jersey resident and local historian, Wagenblast is also the founder of local Cranford life outlet Cranford Radio.

== Personal life ==
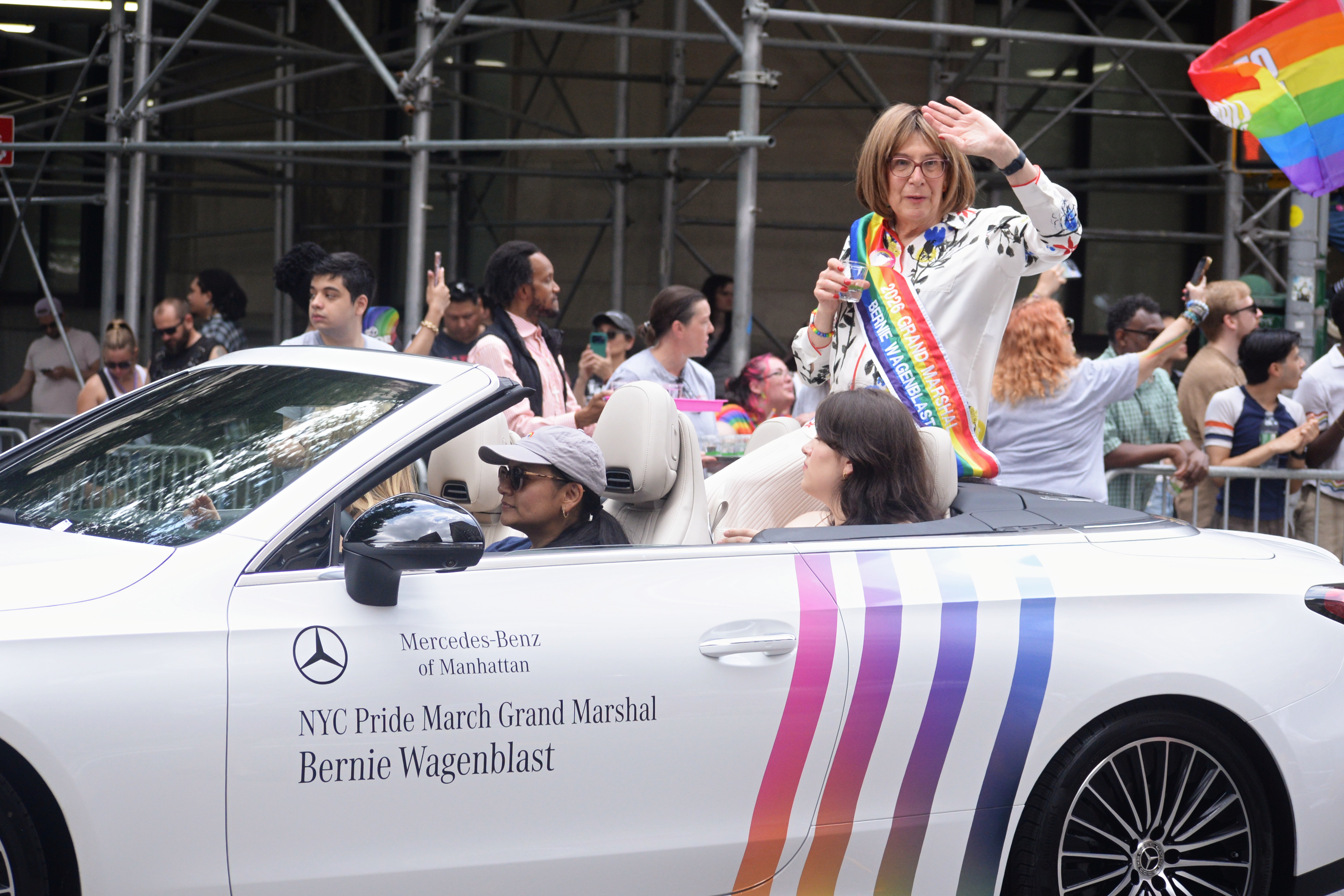
Wagenblast as Grand Marshal of the NYC Pride March in 2026

Wagenblast came out publicly as a trans woman in January 2023; although still going by Bernie, she said her full name would now be Bernadette. In an interview from June 2023, she said that although she had felt like a girl since age 4, she had been dissuaded against feminine dress or behavior at a young age. As a teenager she called Paula Grossman, the only openly trans woman she knew, from a payphone to try and find support. Wagenblast later confided in her wife, and in 2017 she told her adult daughters about her identity. She began privately coming out to friends and family in 2022.

Wagenblast and her wife separated after Wagenblast's transition.
