= Westwood One (1976–2011) =

Former American radio network

- Type: Private
- Industry: Radio Broadcasting
- Founded: 1976
- Founder: Norman J. Pattiz
- Defunct: 2011
- Fate: Merged with Dial Global
- Headquarters: U.S.
- Area served: Nationwide
- Key people: Larry King
- Parent: Infinity Broadcasting Corporation (1993-1997)

Westwood One was an American radio network that was based in New York City. By 1997, it was managed by CBS Radio, which had acquired Infinity Broadcasting Corporation, which had acquired control of Westwood One in 1993, and was later purchased by the private equity firm, The Gores Group. Due to purchases, mergers and other forms of consolidation in the 1980s and 1990s, at one time or another, it had ownership stakes in or syndication rights to some of the most famous brands in network radio, including CBS, NBC, Mutual, CNN, Fox, and Unistar. The company was one of the largest producers and distributors of radio programming in the United States. It broadcast entertainment, news, weather, sports, talk, and traffic programming to about 7,700 radio stations across the United States. The company was the top provider of local traffic reports in the U.S. through its subsidiaries, Metro Networks, Shadow Broadcast Services, SmartRoute Systems, and Sigalert.com. Westwood One also offers weather services; originally using Accuweather, Westwood switched to The Weather Channel in 2009.

Oaktree Capital Management, through its Triton Media Group division, merged with Westwood One in October 2011. Triton then folded Westwood One into its Dial Global subsidiary. The Westwood One name was initially retained for most sports programming. However, starting with the 2011–12 NFL playoffs, Westwood One's sports programming was branded as "Westwood One on the Dial Global Radio Network." After the NFL Playoffs concluded, the Westwood One name was removed altogether in favor of the Dial Global Sports Network, and the sports website was relocated to www.dialglobalsports.com.

On September 4, 2013, Dial Global announced that it was renaming itself Westwood One, citing greater brand recognition.

== History ==
The company was founded by Norman J. Pattiz in 1976. At the time, he was a former advertising sales executive with KCOP-TV, a Los Angeles TV station. He was listening to a local radio station doing a Motown weekend and decided to syndicate The Sound of Motown to radio. The show was a success. He added several more shows during the 1970s, including Dr. Demento and Mary Turner's Off The Record. In 1981, Pattiz started recording live concerts for broadcast with a Chuck Berry performance that January. The company was a leader in live broadcasts and concert recordings for radio until May 2011. By 1982, he was distributing his radio shows via satellite through an arrangement with idb Communications in Culver City. Pattiz took Westwood One public in 1984 and with the money raised by the IPO, he purchased the Mutual Broadcasting System the following year and the NBC Radio Network in 1987. Other highlights in the late 1980s include the purchase of three radio stations, the trade paper Radio & Records, and the hiring of Casey Kasem from ABC.

Although Pattiz long remained a major shareholder and board chairman, control and management shifted to others in the early 1990s. In 1993, operations were shifted to radio station group owner Infinity Broadcasting, headed by Mel Karmazin, who also took over direct management of Westwood. With Infinity already owning and managing competing Unistar Radio Networks (formerly known as the RKO Radio Networks and later as United Stations Radio Networks, which merged with Transtar in the late 1980s), the two companies were combined under the Westwood name in 1994 (later spinning off Transtar in 2006). After the sale of his Infinity Broadcasting to Westinghouse, then parent of CBS, Karmazin went on to become COO of CBS and under his control, CBS took over management of Westwood. CBS also had a significant ownership stake in Westwood, which then purchased Metro Networks in 1999 in a three-way merger including Copter Acquisition Corp. and Westwood.

On August 30, 2010, Pattiz was succeeded as chairman by Mark Stone, senior managing director of the Gores Group, which by then was the majority owner and controlled Westwood. A Westwood press release said Pattiz signed a new contract as a company consultant. Pattiz has now started "PodcastOne," providing a hub for listeners to find their favorite radio personalities.

=== Purchase of Mutual and NBC ===
In 1985, Westwood One purchased the Mutual Broadcasting System, one of the "Big Four" of the 1940s in American radio, continuing to operate it as a separate network into the 1990s. Thereafter, Mutual became a brand name for certain programming provided by Westwood One. CBS-run Westwood One retired Mutual in April, 1999 dropping it in favor of CNN Radio, to which Westwood One had syndication rights following its 1994 merger with Unistar.

Two years after the Mutual purchase, in 1987, Westwood One acquired the NBC Radio Network and licensed the use of the name NBC Radio Network News (later shortened to NBC Radio News) from General Electric, which was divesting all of the NBC radio properties of its former owner RCA. Like Mutual, NBC ceased operating as a radio network and merely became a brand name, even to the point of being merged into Mutual itself. NBC's other services, The Source and NBC Talknet, would eventually be retired in the late 1990s.

Until the Dial Global merger, the NBC Radio brand was still occasionally used, including twice daily at the halfway point and conclusion of the early morning news magazine First Light (which has since revived the NBC branding throughout the program). In 2003, NBC News began contracting with Westwood One to produce a new radio news service, NBC News Radio, consisting of one-minute updates written by Westwood staffers and read by NBC News talent. Westwood One also distributed Meet the Press, monologues of NBC's late night programming, CNBC radio reports, and localized forecasts for The Weather Channel, which effectively united all of NBC's programming under one network.

Westwood One provided operational, sales, and marketing support for the CBS Radio Network, whose properties were owned by the CBS Corporation. In turn, CBS managed production of Mutual and NBC Radio newscasts from 1998 until the retirement of the original NBC Radio top-of-the-hour newscasts in June 2004. The CBS Radio news and sports broadcasts (the latter specifically branded as "from Westwood One") were distributed from the CBS/Westwood One Master Control at the CBS Broadcast Center in New York City.

Westwood One also provided alternate feeds of NFL football games to Sirius Satellite Radio.

Westwood One expanded into digital media with the hiring of radio veteran Gary Krantz in 2006; he remained with the company until March 2008.

=== Sale ===
On May 4, 2007, the New York Post reported that Westwood One had retained investment bank UBS to seek potential buyers for the network.

In October 2007, Westwood and CBS Radio signed a new contractual agreement by which Westwood would hire its own officers and directors, and CBS would use Westwood One programming and trademark licenses. Westwood also had use of CBS trademarks under the agreement, which was filed as part of the companies' public disclosures with the United States Securities and Exchange Commission. The agreement took effect on March 3, 2008, the same day that Gores Radio Group invested $12.5 million as part of a multi-stage investment takeover of Westwood One. The second stage of the Gores investment happened only two weeks later with another $12.5 million, giving Gores Radio direct ownership of more than 14 million shares of Westwood One stock.

Westwood One stock was traded on the New York Stock Exchange until November 21, 2008, when it was delisted for failing to maintain market capitalization requirements. Thereafter, shares of the company traded publicly on the Pink Sheets under the stock symbol WWON.PK. After further stock losses, the Gores Group bought the company outright in March 2009 and relisted it on NASDAQ later that year under the ticker symbol "DIAL."

Westwood One announced its merger with Dial Global in August 2011, closing it on October 21, 2011.

On September 4, 2013, Dial Global, which had been bought by Cumulus Media, assumed the name Westwood One and absorbed Cumulus Media Networks (previously ABC Radio and Citadel Media).

== Overview ==
The company was one of the largest producers and distributors of radio programming in the United States. It broadcast entertainment, news, weather, sports, talk, and traffic programming to about 7,700 radio stations across the USA. It was America's top provider of local traffic reports through its subsidiaries Metro Networks, Shadow Broadcast Services, SmartRoute Systems, and Sigalert.com. Westwood One also offered weather services, originally using Accuweather before switching to The Weather Channel in 2009.

=== Notable personalities ===
Talk radio personalities distributed by Westwood One included at various times Don and Mike, Phil Valentine, Dennis Miller, Jim Bohannon, Billy Bush, Robert Wuhl, Drew Pinsky (Loveline), G. Gordon Liddy, Joe Scarborough, Kevin and Bean, Tom Leykis, Opie and Anthony, and Adam Carolla. The company syndicated these shows across AM and FM affiliates but did not provide the programs to satellite radio. Westwood One distributed the radio news operations of CNN and NBC as well as its corporate cousin, the CBS Radio Network.

In 1988, Casey Kasem moved from ABC Radio Networks to Westwood One after a contract dispute. Pattiz created Casey's Top 40, Casey's Countdown, and Casey's Hot 20 for him. Kasem stayed with the network for nine years, leaving in 1998 when AM/FM Radio Networks (now Premiere Radio Networks) allowed him to bring back American Top 40.

In the early 2000s, Westwood One handled the distribution of Fox News Radio; that has since moved to Premiere Radio Networks. One Fox program, The Radio Factor, hosted by Bill O'Reilly, continued to be distributed by Westwood One until his departure from the show in January 2009. The time slot was later filled by Fred Thompson and Douglas Urbanski.

Imus in the Morning was carried on Westwood One from 1993 until the controversy surrounding his remarks about the Rutgers women's basketball team led to his firing in 2007. The program was then heard on Cumulus Media Networks until the show ended in June 2018.

In 2009, the network added several short-form features based on television series syndicated by CBS Television Distribution: The Doctors' Orders, Ask Dr. Phil, Rach on the Radio, and The Insider Radio Minute.

Westwood One attempted to secure the rights to The Savage Nation, but current syndicator Talk Radio Network refused to let host Michael Savage out of what apparently is a perpetual contract. By the time the dispute was settled in Savage's favor, Westwood One had already dissolved.

Rick Dees moved from Citadel Media to Westwood One in 2011.

=== 24-hour radio formats via satellite to affiliate stations ===
Until 2006, Westwood One distributed a number of 24-hour radio formats via satellite to affiliate stations. These formats included: Adult Rock & Roll (classic rock), Adult Standards (formerly AM Only), Bright AC (hot adult contemporary), CNN Headline News, Hot Country, Mainstream Country, SAM - Simply About Music (variety hits), Soft AC, The Oldies Channel, and Westwood One 70s. The 24-hour formats, originally acquired through Westwood One's purchase of Unistar in 1993, were spun off in 2006 and are currently distributed under the Dial Global brand.

The lone exception is the audio feed of CNN Headline News, which remains part of the CNN Radio branding under Westwood One.

=== Music programs syndicated ===
Westwood One syndicated several popular programs for a variety of music formats. Perhaps its most famous alumnus was Casey Kasem, who spent over nine years hosting a weekly radio countdown franchise for the network.

Other shows included The Beatle Years with Bob Malik (originally hosted by Elliot Mintz and later J. J. Jackson), Beatle Brunch with Joe Johnson, Country Countdown USA, Superstar Concert Series, "Absolutely Live," Country Gold (in most markets, also known as Country Gold Saturday Night, but also available on Sunday), Randy Jackson's Hit List with Randy Jackson and Kesha Monk, 106 and Park Weekend Countdown with Terrence and Rocsi, MTV TRL Weekend Countdown, Off the Record with Mary Turner (and later Joe Benson), VH1 Concerts and Specials, Out of Order with Jed the Fish, and the Country Six Pack of holiday music specials. The Dr. Demento Show was carried from 1978 to 1992.

Many of these programs were not maintained in the Dial Global merger; Compass Media Networks picked up the rock-oriented programs, the country programs were split up among various networks, and the fate of the pop programs is unknown.

=== Live concerts and sports broadcasts ===
Westwood One was notable for its coverage and location recording of live concerts and events for broadcast/distribution via LP and eventually satellite. They syndicated the summer solstice Grateful Dead concert on June 21, 1989, a service that currently conglomerated radio stations no longer do. Since the merger with Dial Global, the company no longer records live music and has shut down its mobile recording division.

The company holds exclusive national radio rights for many sporting events including National Football League and college football games, the Olympic Games, the NCAA basketball tournament (this and NFL coverage are co-produced with corporate sibling CBS TV), the Masters and U.S. Open golf, the Wimbledon tennis tournament, the Frozen Four of college hockey, and the GRAMMY Awards. For many years the network also aired Notre Dame football and National Hockey League games.

Westwood One has also handled sales and advertising for the Sports USA Radio Network since 2009. Notable sports announcers for Dial Global include: Scott Graham, Kevin Harlan, Brad Sham, Dave Sims, Kevin Kugler, John Tautges, John Sadak, Ian Eagle, Tom McCarthy, Chuck Cooperstein, Kevin Calabro, and Dave Ryan. Past personalities include Marv Albert, Howard David, Gary Cohen, and Harry Kalas.

=== Syndicated news and traffic programming ===
In 2005, Westwood One, Inc. and its traffic subsidiary, Metro Networks, sent several existing officers and directors of Westwood to Canada and Australia to unify a number of helicopter aviation companies that were already providing reports to Westwood One and Metro Networks' affiliates. The result was the formation of the Global Traffic Network, which began taking deliveries of Robinson R44 news helicopters in 2005. The companies signed a three-way content and data sharing agreement in November 2005.

== See also ==
- List of United States radio networks
- NFL on Westwood One
- NHL Radio
