= WSOU =

Radio station at Seton Hall University

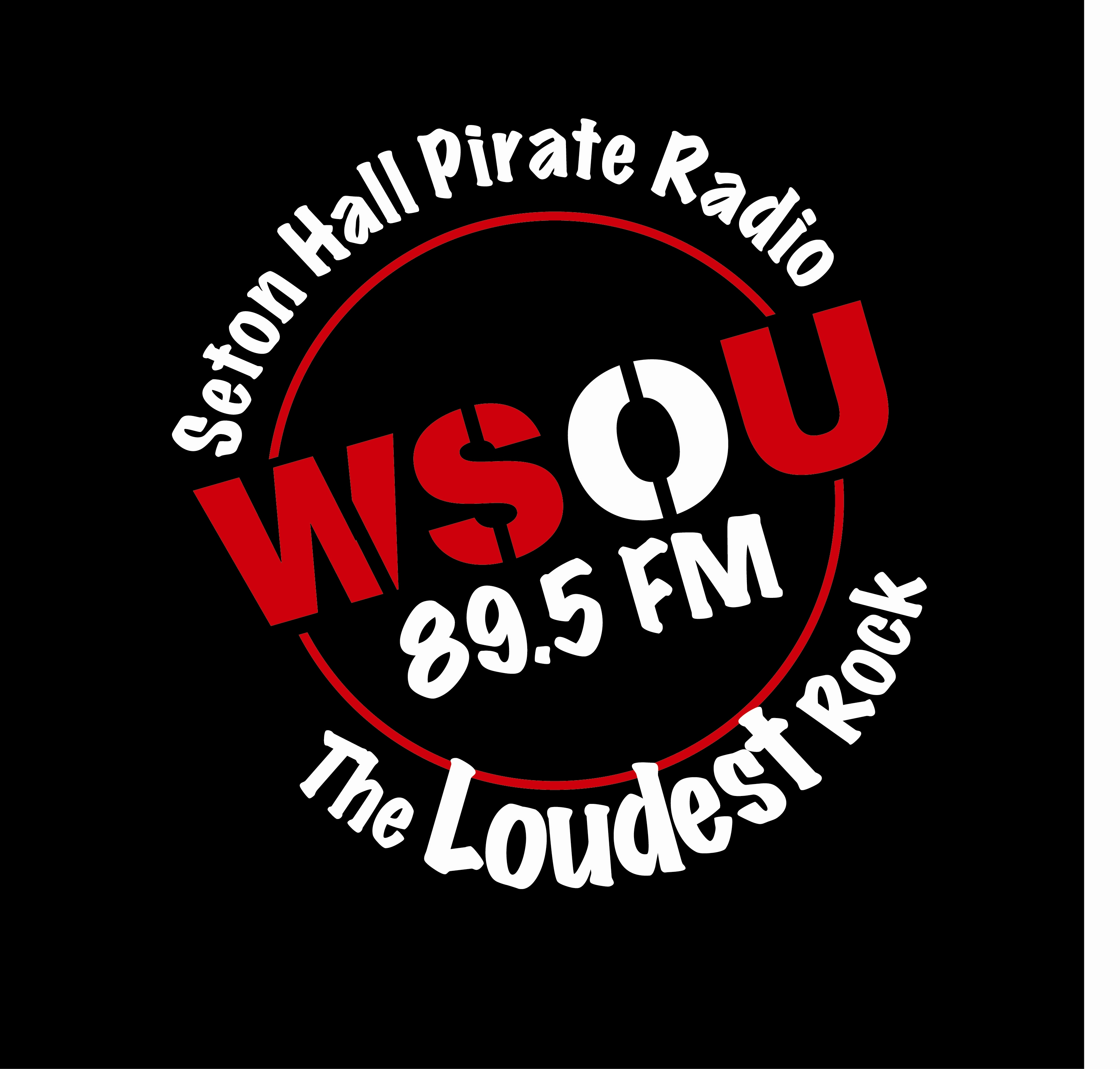
- South Orange, New Jersey; United States
- Broadcast area: New York metropolitan area
- Frequency: 89.5 MHz (HD Radio)

Programming
- Format: Active rock
- Subchannels: HD2: Catholic Radio (Christian radio)

Ownership
- Owner: Seton Hall University

History
- First air date: April 14, 1948
- Call sign meaning: "South Orange University"

Technical information
- Licensing authority: FCC
- Facility ID: 59707
- Class: A
- ERP: 2,400 watts
- HAAT: 95 meters (312 ft)
- Transmitter coordinates: 40°44′28.00″N 74°14′42.00″W

Links
- Public license information: Public file; LMS
- Webcast: Listen live (via iHeartRadio)
- Website: www.wsou.net

WSOU (89.5 FM) is a non-commercial, student-run college radio station. The station broadcasts from the campus of Seton Hall University in South Orange, New Jersey.

== History ==
WSOU began broadcasting on 89.5 FM on April 14, 1948, under the direction of Monsignor Thomas J. Gillhooly, the station's first faculty director. It was the first college-owned FM station in New Jersey and one of the first FM stations in the United States.

Given the assignment by then-Seton Hall University president Monsignor James Kelly to create a radio station, Monsignor Gillhooly got WSOU up and running in just three months and provided a steady hand during the station's early days. Assisting Monsignor Gillhooly in building WSOU was the station's longtime chief engineer Tom Parnham, who helped construct the station and then remained with WSOU. Parnham worked at WSOU from 1948 until his death in 1994.

WSOU began taking the shape of its current format in 1969, the first year it began to air rock and roll music. It embraced a hard rock and metal format starting on September 4, 1986. Other station milestones include the move to stereo technology in the 1970s, the start of online streaming in the mid-1990s (among the first NJ stations to do so), and the move to digital HD radio technology in 2008.

In the 2000s, WSOU underwent amendments to its music format. At the request of university officials citing the Catholic mission of Seton Hall, certain bands were eliminated from regular rotation, while others were relegated to overnight airplay only. The most notable band that was eliminated from rotation was heavy metal act Slayer.

It is estimated that over 120,000 people listen to the station each week. Its 2,400-watt signal from the Seton Hall campus reaches all five boroughs of New York City and much of northern and central New Jersey.

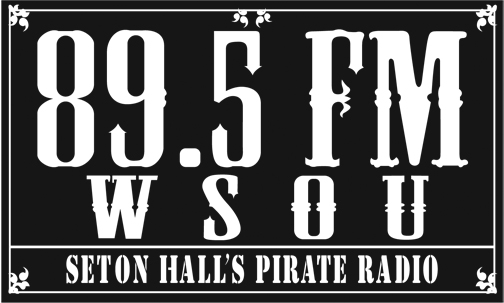
A "vintage" WSOU logo, used with promotional items in the 2000s

WSOU's studios were originally located first floor of the university's recreation center, part of its South Orange campus. In 1998, the station was moved to a state-of-the-art facility inside a new addition to the recreation center.

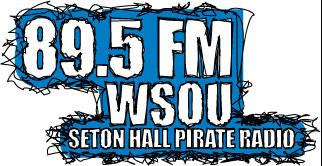
Logo used from 2010-2013

It operates there to this day, complete with three recording studios, a newsroom, the main on-air studio, the James Malespina Master Control Room, offices for student and station management, a classroom and the Dino and Diane Tortu Student Lounge.

Due to a sponsorship arrangement, WSOU has renamed their studios the Meadowlands Racetrack studio, as heard during their station identification messages.

In 2021 DJ Valentino Petrarca made history by being the first staff member to interview 100 artists. When he left WSOU in 2022 he had ended with 136.

WSOU has earned many honors and numerous awards over the years, including:

- Marconi Award for Best Non-Commercial Radio, 2016
- Peabody Award
- CMJ College Station of the Year (multiple times)
- Friday Morning Quarterback Metal Station of the Year (three consecutive times)
- Recipient of over 30 gold and platinum records, ranging from Iron Maiden to Linkin Park
- Rolling Stone rock magazine distinction as a "Top 5 radio stations in the country"

=== WSOU and Seton Hall University ===
WSOU has been a crucial part of the Seton Hall University community since its inception. In its current format, all of the station's DJs, newscasters, sportscasters and engineers are enrolled students at the university (with the exception of weekend community programmers, many of which are Seton Hall alumni).

Additionally, students are elected to one-year management terms to head the station – specifically the programming, music, promotions, news and sports departments. Through the students and the community programmers, the station stays live on the air 24/7, 365 days a year.

Since its inception, WSOU has always been a student-run radio station and, to this day, Seton Hall University owns the station's FM license.

Although a noncommercial station, WSOU's management and staff structure is modeled on commercial radio, which provides students with enriching career-oriented educational experiences. Opportunities for student staff members include on-air hosting (DJing), production, promotions, newscasting, sportscasting, programming, sales and marketing, and engineering. WSOU draws students from all university colleges and programs, including communications, business, biology, education, nursing, sports management and diplomacy.

The WSOU student staff also participate with many university events, such as the annual University Day homecoming weekend.

=== Controversies ===
Since WSOU's inception, station management has frequently clashed with Seton Hall University's president and board of trustees over its heavy metal programming. Monsignor Robert Sheeran, who was at the time president of Seton Hall, felt it was inappropriate for a Roman Catholic educational and religious institution to air programming counter to the Roman Catholic belief. Sheeran and the university's board of trustees made veiled threats to shut the station down and sell the FCC license if programming was not more aligned to the Catholic faith. The university, realizing the large listener and community support, backed down and let the station's heavy metal programming continue. Catholic programming was later made available on WSOU's HD-2 sub-digital channel.

On June 1, 2006, Michael Collazo, a Seton Hall University professor and faculty advisor at WSOU, was arrested and charged with money laundering and embezzlement of over half a million dollars from illegal leasing of the station's subcarrier to EIES of New Jersey, an audio service for the blind and a Haitian radio service starting in 1991 until he was fired by Seton Hall University in 2004 after the university conducted an audit of WSOU's finances. On July 12, 2006, Collazo pleaded guilty to embezzlement, with prosecutors seeking a five-year jail sentence.

In 2021, members of a group calling themselves "Shut Down WSOU" began protesting outside Seton Hall University, claiming WSOU to be "Satanic" and demanding that the station be shut down. In response, a Seton Hall University spokesperson stated that "WSOU's advisory board comprised of WSOU students and alumni along with Seton Hall University clergy and administrators, meets regularly to review the station's content and operating policies and standards."

== Programming ==
The station currently broadcasts a modern active rock format, featuring heavy metal, punk, emo, hardcore and post-hardcore as well as other types of rock-based music. Student disc jockeys play music from this regular rotation during the vast majority of the week – with the exception of specialty shows and community programming (see below).

=== Sports programming ===
WSOU's sports department broadcasts all home and away games for both men's and women's basketball, the school's flagship sports. Also aired throughout the year are select games for men's and women's soccer, baseball and softball.

Following each men's basketball game is Hall Line, a post game call-in show that allows Pirate fans the chance to share their thoughts about the game and/or the team. The show, which is hosted by student on-air talent, either in-studio or at the site of the game, has been on the air since the 1960s.

Along with Hall Line, WSOU also offers two Sunday evening sports talk shows hosted by students, Empire Sports Talk (pro sports talk) and Pirate Primetime (Seton Hall athletics talk).

=== WSOU HD2 ===
On July 1, 2009, WSOU launched WSOU HD2, a 24/7 Catholic programming channel.

== Notable alumni ==
For more than 70 years, WSOU has been mentoring and graduating students who go on successful careers in the news, broadcast, music and entertainment industries. The following is a sampling of the many noteworthy station alumni.

- Robert Desiderio, actor
- Donna Fiducia, former Fox News Channel anchor and NYC television personality
- Jim Hunter, play-by-play announcer, Baltimore Orioles
- John Kobylt, KFI talk show host
- Bob Ley, ESPN Sports Center anchor
- Matt Loughlin, New Jersey Devils radio play-by-play announcer
- Ed Lucas, Emmy-winning Yankee blind broadcaster, YES Network
- Mark St. Germain, playwright
- Pete Tauriello, 1010 WINS/Metro Networks traffic reporter
- Bernie Wagenblast, WINS, WABC traffic reporter, one of the voices of the New York City Subway
- Bob Wussler, former president, CBS Television Network; co-founder of CNN (deceased)

== See also ==
- College radio
- List of college radio stations in the United States
