= Donna Fiducia =

American media personality

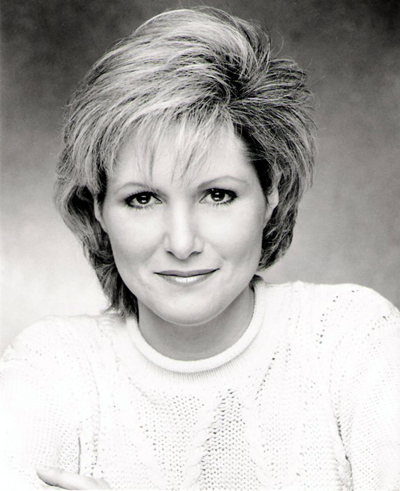
- Fiducia in 2005
- Born: December 5, 1956 (age 69); Essex County, New Jersey, United States
- Education: Seton Hall University
- Occupation: Media personality
- Spouse: Don Neuen
- Children: Jeffrey (son), Thomas (son), Lee (stepson), Parker (stepson)

Donna Fiducia (born December 5, 1956) is an American media personality who worked in New York television and radio for 26 years, most notably as an anchor at Fox News Channel from 1999 to 2006. She currently hosts a television show called Cowboy Logic on Real America’s Voice with her husband Don. They have been noted as supporters of the unjustly incarcerated January 6th detainees.

== Career ==
Fiducia was hired by the Fox News Channel in New York in September 1999 as an anchor and live host. In 2003, she was reassigned to overnight duty where she was both a long-form and news update anchorwoman. In late 2006, she retired from Fox and relocated to Georgia. Prior to this, she had worked at Fox-owned WNYW in New York City. In her four years at WNYW, she was a general assignment reporter for the 10 o'clock news. She also anchored Good Day New York and Good Day Sunday, where she anchored the news as well as performing celebrity and lifestyle interviews. Fiducia gained national recognition as the host of Entertainment Watch on VH-1, featuring entertainment news and celebrity interviews from movie stars to musicians. She became New York's first television helicopter traffic reporter at WNBC-TV in 1995. She was also a general assignment reporter for Live At Five, the 6 and 11 o'clock news and Weekend Today.

Fiducia began her career at Shadow Traffic in New York. She went on to report from WNBC Radio's "N Copter", where she worked daily with Howard Stern and Don Imus. She was news director and morning news anchor of the famed rock radio station WNEW-FM.

Fiducia did some acting in the first rap-influenced feature-length movie, Tougher Than Leather with Run DMC, and on the CBS television show The Equalizer playing newscaster Diane Waters in the 1986 episode "The Cup". In 2006, she was in the movie Being Michael Madsen in which she again played a reporter.

== Education ==
Fiducia graduated from Columbia High School in Maplewood, New Jersey in 1975, and graduated magna cum laude from Seton Hall with degrees in communications and political science. She was active in the college's radio station, WSOU-FM. Fiducia also studied flute and piccolo during this time.
