= Orionette =

Orionette AG für Motorfahrzeuge
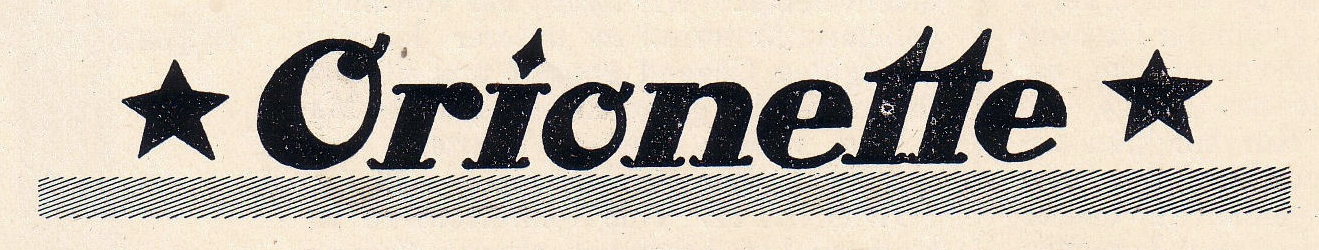
- Industry: Automotive and motorcycle industry
- Founded: 1921
- Defunct: 1925
- Fate: defunct
- Headquarters: Industriehof Oranienstraße 6, Berlin, Germany
- Key people: Engelbert Zaschka (Chief Engineer)
- Products: motorcycles, bicycle auxiliary engines

Orionette is a historic German motorcycle brand.

The Orionette AG für Motorfahrzeuge (also: Orion AG für Motorfahrzeuge) was a German motorcycle manufacturer. The company was founded in 1921. The company's headquarters was the Industriehof Oranienstraße 6 in Berlin-Kreuzberg. There was also the serial production of the Orionette. It was one of the most important companies in the automotive and motorcycle industry in Berlin.

The company built a range of 129 cc (7.9 cu in), 137 cc (8.4 cu in), 148 cc (9.0 cu in) and 346 cc (21.1 cu in) two-stroke machines with mainly unitdesign engines and two or three-speed gearboxes. The design department, headed by Engelbert Zaschka, also produced unorthodox designs whose manufacturing processes were kept confidential under the brand of Zaschka.

Eventually sales declined and in 1925 the company went bankrupt and closed.
