= Transportation Communications Newsletter =

Electronic newsletter

Transportation Communications Newsletter is an electronic newsletter published Monday through Friday via Yahoo Groups and Google Groups. It has ISSN 1529-1057.

The newsletter began as a discussion group on MakeList.com on June 13, 1998 and evolved into its current newsletter format over the next several years. The newsletter features a collection of news items and information related to all aspects of communications in the transportation field. Frequent topics include intelligent transportation systems, telematics and traveler information systems. The newsletter uses a headline and link format which allows readers to skim the stories and click on only those which are of interest.

The newsletter's founder and editor is Bernie Wagenblast who has worked in various aspects of transportation communications since 1979. This includes time as a radio traffic reporter in New York City, manager of a public sector transportation operations center and as a voiceover artist for various transportation projects including AirTrain Newark, AirTrain JFK and the Triborough Bridge and Tunnel Authority's E-ZPass service center.

The newsletter ranks as the top Yahoo Group in the transportation category, based on the number of subscribers. Total subscribers in February 2009 were over 7,000.
