= Metro Networks =

Former outsourcing company for traffic and news reports to broadcast outlets

- Headquarters: Houston, Texas

Metro Networks was a broadcasting outsourcing company based in Houston, Texas. It was a subsidiary of Westwood One until its sale to Clear Channel Communications in 2011. The company operated local and regional news and traffic operations that provided regular reports to affiliates, together with its sister company Shadow Broadcast Services. At the time of the sale to Clear Channel Communications, Metro Networks had approximately 2,300 radio affiliates and 170 television affiliates operating in nearly every major radio and television market of the United States, as well as 700+ websites.

In addition to offering live and recorded broadcasting reports, Metro Networks operated its own news wire service, Metro Source, rebranded by Clear Channel as 24/7 News Source. Metro Source was started in 1997 to compete with other wire services, such as the Associated Press and Reuters. Its "World Desk" is based in Phoenix, Arizona. 24/7 News Source provides hundreds of radio stations and websites with national, state, feature and local stories, including audio and photos.

On April 29, 2011, Westwood One sold Metro Networks to Clear Channel Communications for $119.25 million so it can concentrate on their other properties. Clear Channel combined Metro Networks with its own Total Traffic Networks. Metro Networks' traffic service was eventually folded into Total Traffic Networks later that year, with Clear Channel keeping the Total Traffic name for the operation.
