= WVBN (FM) =

Radio station in Bronxville, New York

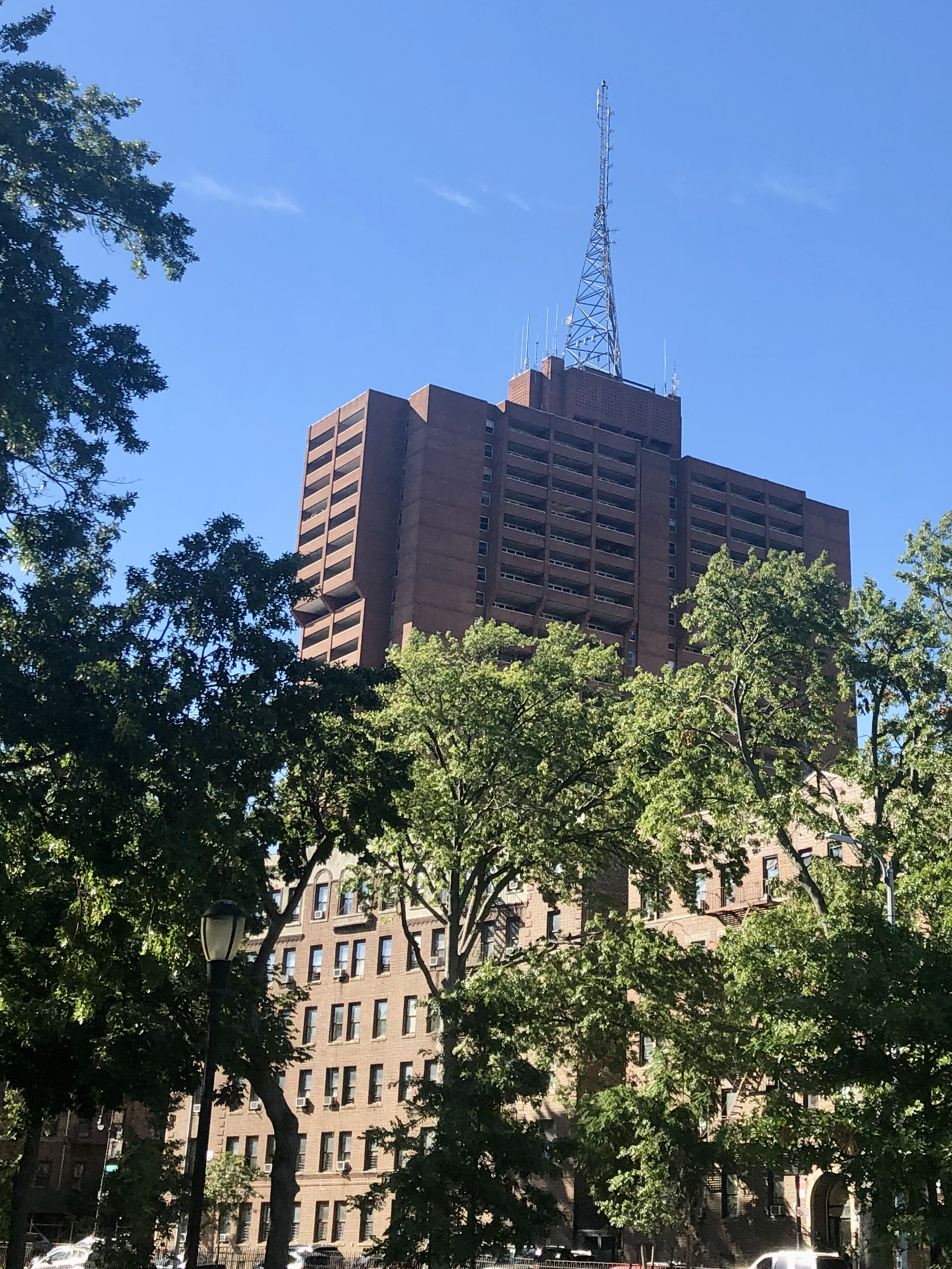
- WVBN's broadcast tower, shared with WFUV, at Montefiore Medical Center
- Bronxville, New York; United States
- Broadcast area: Hudson Valley and New York City
- Frequency: 103.9 MHz

Programming
- Language: English
- Format: Christian radio
- Network: VCY America
- Affiliations: SRN News

Ownership
- Owner: VCY America; (VCY America, Inc.)

History
- First air date: September 1, 1947
- Former call signs: WFAS-FM (1946–1971); WWYD (1971–1982); WFAS-FM (1982–2014); WNBM (2014–2022); WFAS-FM (2022–2023)
- Call sign meaning: VCY Bronxville & New York

Technical information
- Licensing authority: FCC
- Facility ID: 14380
- Class: A
- ERP: 980 watts
- HAAT: 162.1 meters (532 ft)
- Transmitter coordinates: 40°52′48″N 73°52′39″W

Links
- Public license information: Public file; LMS
- Webcast: Listen live
- Website: www.vcy.org

WVBN (103.9 MHz) is a radio station licensed to Bronxville, New York. The station is owned by VCY America and features a Christian radio format, consisting of teaching and traditional Christian music. WVBN's transmitter and tower are located on the campus of Montefiore Medical Center in the New York City borough of the Bronx.

== Station history ==
=== Early years ===
The station first signed on the air September 1, 1947, as WFAS-FM, licensed to White Plains, New York. WFAS-FM's targeted listening area was Westchester County and the lower Hudson Valley region, initially simulcasting sister station WFAS (1230 AM) before adopting a separate full-service format; it later evolved into an easy listening station, and then an adult contemporary outlet by the mid-1980s. Its primary competitor through much of its history was another regional FM station, WHUD (100.7 FM) in Peekskill.

=== Move to New York City, switch to urban AC ===
To increase their reach of the New York metropolitan market, as well as increasing the value of the station, in 2012 Cumulus applied to the Federal Communications Commission for a construction permit to move the station's transmitter tower location to the Bronx and subsequently change the station's community of license to Bronxville, all to better target New York City itself. The permit was approved in mid-2013. Rumors on radio industry insider websites speculated that the station would change its programming format, and flip to either urban contemporary or modern rock (which would fill the format hole in the market after WRXP flipped to a simulcast of WFAN in November 2012).

On June 30, 2014, WFAS-FM's existing on-air staff departed. Five days later, at midnight on July 4, WFAS-FM signed off its transmitter in Hartsdale (co-located with WFAS [AM]), after a set of "goodbye"-themed songs, which ended with "Graduation (Friends Forever)" by Vitamin C. Later that day at 9:00 am, the new Bronx transmitter signed on, and 103.9 FM began stunting with a ticking clock, and at 1:03 pm, the station officially flipped to urban adult contemporary as "Radio 103.9" under the new callsign WNBM.

The WFAS-FM call sign and its programming continued to exist via online streaming and as the HD2 sub-channel of sister FM station WPLJ (replacing the True Oldies Channel after Cumulus announced the end of that network, which came a few days earlier). Additionally, on August 29, 2014, at 2:00 pm, WFAS-FM returned to the analog airwaves, broadcasting on W232AL (a low-power translator station licensed to Pomona, New York) at 94.3 MHz. Its local staff was gone by June 2015, going automated with the Westwood One "AC Network" until May 2019, when Cumulus sold the translator to a religious outlet and ceased its operations.

WNBM's primary competition was WBLS, New York City's heritage urban adult contemporary outlet. The station served as the New York affiliate for the Tom Joyner Morning Show and D.L. Hughley's afternoon program, both of which were distributed by Urban One-owned Reach Media. The station was generally unsuccessful, and an afterthought entirely in the New York ratings overall.

Throughout 2019, Cumulus began to withdraw from the New York market in earnest to pay down debts from its 2018 bankruptcy, selling WPLJ to the Educational Media Foundation, WNSH to Entercom, and WABC to John Catsimatidis's Red Apple Media; after the WABC sale announcement, Cumulus stated that WNBM would be divested as well. WNBM's AM sister station, WFAS, ran automated as a CBS Sports Radio affiliate until converting to an HD Radio-only broadcast in May 2021, also carrying an all-automated conservative talk format; WFAS permanently ceased operations in October 2024.

In anticipation of a future sale, WNBM ceased live programming on November 8, 2019, and became fully automated, terminating its remaining airstaff in the process. With the COVID-19 pandemic effectively ensuring a sale would not occur in the near future, the station added the Westwood One-distributed, Atlanta-based Rick & Sasha program to mornings in late April 2020 to replace Joyner, who retired at the end of 2019. Rick & Sasha lasted a year on the station, as Cumulus canceled the program in April 2021. The Hughley program was eventually dropped as well, resulting in Westwood One's urban adult contemporary–formatted The Touch radio service, delivered via satellite, being heard in all time periods.

=== Switch to talk, return to WFAS-FM ===
On December 15, 2021, Cumulus announced that the station would flip to a simulcast of WFAS at the beginning of 2022 (restoring the AM HD Radio-only station to an analog band), and likewise have the WFAS-FM call sign restored. The programming switch took effect on the evening of January 2, 2022; the WFAS-FM call sign returned the following day.

=== Acquisition by VCY America ===
On December 8, 2022, Cumulus announced the sale of WFAS-FM to Milwaukee-based VCY America for $7.25 million, pending FCC approval. The sale was consummated on February 6, 2023, and its license was converted to non-commercial operation under the new call letters WVBN, and the station began airing VCY America's Christian radio programming. The call sign change was officially approved by the FCC on February 10.
