= WFAS (AM) =

Radio station in White Plains, New York (1926–2024)

- White Plains, New York; United States
- Broadcast area: Westchester County
- Frequencies: 1230 kHz (HD Radio); (digital only, 2021–2024)

Ownership
- Owner: Cumulus Media; (Cumulus Licensing LLC)

History
- First air date: August 19, 1926
- Last air date: October 7, 2024; (98 years, 49 days)
- Former call signs: WBRS (1926–1928); WCOH (1928–1932)
- Former frequencies: 1420 kHz (1927–1928); 1210 kHz (1928–1941); 1240 kHz (1941–1943)
- Call sign meaning: Frank A. Seitz, Sr.

Technical information
- Facility ID: 14381
- Class: C
- Power: 1,000 watts
- Transmitter coordinates: 41°1′32.35″N 73°49′37.48″W

WFAS (1230 AM, HD Radio) was a commercial digital-only radio station licensed to White Plains, New York, United States. The station was owned by Cumulus Media and broadcast with 1,000 watts. Its studios and transmitter site were located on North End Avenue, in New York, New York.

At the time of its closure, WFAS aired a conservative talk format with programming from Westwood One, which is itself owned by Cumulus Media. The station began all-digital HD Radio broadcasting on May 24, 2021, after notifying the Federal Communications Commission (FCC).

== History ==
WFAS's first license, as WBRS, was granted on August 19, 1926, to Universal Radio Manufacturing, Inc., located at 1062 Broadway in Brooklyn, New York. In 1928 the station was taken over by the Westchester Broadcasting Corporation, which changed the call sign to WCOH and relocated to the Greenville neighborhood in Yonkers.

Due to the limited number of frequencies available for the highly congested New York City region, it was common beginning in the mid-1920s to require multiple stations to share a common frequency. On June 15, 1927, WBRS was assigned to 1420 kHz along with two other area stations. On November 11, 1928, under the provisions of the Federal Radio Commission's (FRC) General Order 40, the now-WCOH was reassigned to 1210 kHz on a shared time basis with three different stations.

In 1932 the callsign was changed to WFAS, and the station relocated to White Plains. This call sign honored the two owners' husband and father, Frank A. Seitz, Sr. WFAS made its debut on August 11, 1932, from the Roger Smith Hotel, on the corner of Post Road and Chester Avenue in White Plains. WFAS initially broadcast with 100 watts using a T-top antenna located on the hotel's roof.

In 1941, with the implementation of the North American Regional Broadcasting Agreement (NARBA), most stations on 1210 kHz, including WFAS, were reassigned to 1240 kHz. By March 1943, the station had moved to 1230 kHz, becoming a full-time operation which no longer had to share its frequency with any other stations. In 1947, the transmitter site moved to Secor Road in the Town of Greenburgh. Concurrent with that move, WFAS-FM (103.9) signed on the air on August 1, from the same location. The T-top antenna continued to be used as an auxiliary while the studios remained at the Roger Smith Hotel.

In 1948, WFAS and WFAS-FM moved to new studios and offices in the building of the White Plains Reporter Dispatch newspaper. By 1954, the studios had moved out of the City of White Plains into the Secor Road location. In 1963, the station increased power to 1,000 watts.

In 2011, WFAS began a trial of sports programming with Bob Wolfe, in addition to station originals such as Bruce Hall's Second Opinion, which featured Bruce Hall and Roy G. Edwards, founder of Sports Mancave, which aired for 3 years before WFAS moved transmitters. Second Opinion hosted such events as the Westchester Golf Show, and had recurring guests of Clarke Judge, San Francisco Giants manager Bruce Bochy, and NFL Network contributor Russle Baxter.

In 2014, WFAS-FM changed its call sign to WNBM, moved its transmitter site to The Bronx and its studios to Cumulus' Penn Plaza facilities in Midtown Manhattan, to become an urban adult contemporary station serving the New York metropolitan area.

On February 3, 2016, WFAS changed formats from talk radio to sports, branded as "Sportsradio 1230", with programming from CBS Sports Radio.

On April 20, 2021, it was announced that WFAS had notified the FCC of their intentions to convert to an exclusively digital HD Radio signal, their plan being to complete the process by May 24. The station would be the third AM station in the United States to do so, following WWFD in Frederick, Maryland (broadcasting to the Washington D.C. area), and WMGG near Tampa, Florida. However, unlike these other two stations, WFAS's programming was not also carried over an analog FM translator. With the announcement, WFAS would also flip to conservative talk the same day, branded as "Digital AM 1230, New Talk for New York", featuring a variety of conservative talk shows otherwise not cleared in the market. CBS Sports Radio (renamed Infinity Sports Network on April 15, 2024) continued to fill weekend timeslots. On December 15, 2021, Cumulus announced that WNBM would begin simulcasting WFAS on January 3, 2022, giving the station an analog signal; the simulcast ended on February 6, 2023, after 103.9 (which had returned to the WFAS-FM call sign) was sold to VCY America and became WVBN.

On October 7, 2024, Cumulus Media surrendered WFAS's license to the Federal Communications Commission, which cancelled the license on October 15, 2024.
