= Shadow Traffic =

Shadow Broadcast Services.
- Industry: Broadcasting - Radio
- Fate: Merged with Total Traffic Network, a subsidiary of iHeartMedia

Shadow Broadcast Services (Shadow Traffic) was a broadcasting outsourcing company based in Rutherford, New Jersey. It was a subsidiary of Clear Channel Communications. Together with its sister companies Metro Networks, Metro Source, Total Traffic Network, SigAlert and Traffax, the company operated a number of local and regional news and traffic operations that provided regular reports to affiliates.

The company was founded in 1975 by Michael Lenet in Philadelphia, Pennsylvania. The name was derived from Lenet's handle, or nickname; he called himself the "Silver Shadow." Lenet began the operation as an informal traffic reporting service that was provided over citizens' band radio. Soon after, Lenet began providing traffic information to various radio stations in Philadelphia.

Among the original air staff in New York were Donna Fiducia, Fred Feldman, George W. Forman, Susan Murphy, Joe Nolan and Bernie Wagenblast. Murphy also served as program director, and Fred Feldman was the general manager. Joe Biermann was the operations manager.

The company grew and expanded into other markets, beginning in 1978 with Chicago, Illinois. New York City followed in December, 1979. This expansion continued throughout the 1980s and 1990s. During that time the company began offering news, weather, and sports services to its affiliates. The primary business philosophy was to provide broadcast services at little or no cost to their affiliates. The majority of the revenue was brought in through sponsorship deals; direct sponsoring of the traffic reports themselves did this. Chicago on-air personalities included John "Radio" Russell Ghrist.

In March 1996 Shadow Broadcast Services was partially acquired by Westwood One, and then it was fully owned by Westwood One in May 1998. By that time Shadow Broadcast Services had affiliate relations with more than 350 radio and TV stations in 15 major markets.

In March 1999 Shadow Broadcast Services formed what was referred to as a “strategic alliance” with SmartRoute Systems, which was a technology based company that provided traffic information and data for local DOT (Department of Transportation) and broadcast use. This partnership was set up to help Shadow Traffic supply comprehensive and accurate traffic information for their radio and television affiliates. This partnership eventually dissolved when the acquisition of Metro Networks took place by Westwood One, which was announced in June, 1999, and then completed in September of that same year. Westwood One merged their two companies together to form Metro Networks/Shadow Broadcast Service, commonly abbreviated as Metro/Shadow. SmartRoute Systems was not directly partnered with Shadow Traffic after the acquisition of Metro Networks took place.

However, in June 2000 Westwood One announced its acquisition of SmartRoute Systems. That company was eventually combined under the Westwood One umbrella of subsidiaries, which include Metro/Shadow.

Most of the branch offices of Metro/Shadow have working relationships with the local Department of Transportation (DOT), local and state police, and government agencies to gather and distribute traffic information through their affiliates. Other traffic information is gathered by listening to police/fire/rescue scanners, phone calls, viewing traffic cameras, and visual reports made by reporters in fixed-wing and/or rotary-wing aircraft.

In September 2008 Westwood One announced that they were reducing their Metro/Shadow operations centers from 60 offices to 13 regional hubs. Metro/Shadow claimed to have more than 1,800 traffic reporters, with radio and TV affiliates in all of the major US markets.

On April 29, 2011, Westwood One sold Metro Networks to iHeartMedia (then known as Clear Channel Communications) for $119.25 million so it can concentrate on their other properties. Clear Channel combined Metro Networks with its own Total Traffic Networks. Metro Networks' traffic service was eventually folded into Total Traffic Networks later that year, with Clear Channel keeping the Total Traffic name for the operation.
