= Izidor Guzmics =

Hungarian theologian

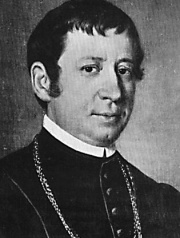
Guzmics Izidor

Izidor Guzmics (April 7, 1786 – September 1, 1839) was a Hungarian theologian

Guzmics was born in Vámos-Család in the county of Sopron. At Sopron he was instructed in the art of poetry by Pál Horváth. In October 1805 he entered the Benedictine order, but left it in August of the following year only again to assume the monastic garb on November 10, 1806. At the monastery of Pannonhalma he applied himself to the study of Greek under Farkas Tóth and in 1812 he was sent to Pest to study theology.

Here he read the best German and Hungarian authors, and took part in the editorship of the Nemzeti (National) Plutarkus, and in the translation of Johann Hübner's Lexicon. On obtaining the degree of doctor of divinity in 1816, he returned to Pannonhalma, where he devoted himself to dogmatic theology and literature, and contributed largely to Hungarian periodicals.

The most important of his theological works are: A kath. anyaszentegyháznak hitbeli tanítása (The Doctrinal Teaching of the Holy Catholic Church), and A keresztényeknek vallásbeli egyesülésekről (On Religious Unity among Christians), both published at Pest in 1822; also a Latin treatise entitled Theologia Christiana fundamentalis et theologia dogmatica (4 vols, Győr, 1828–1829).

His translation of Theocritus in hexameters was published in 1824. His versions of the Oedipus of Sophocles and of the Iphigenia in Aulis of Euripides were rewarded by the Hungarian Academy, of which in 1838 he was elected honorary member.

In 1832 he was appointed abbot of the wealthy Benedictine house at Bakonybél, a village in the county of Veszprém. There he built an asylum for 150 children, and founded a school of harmony and singing.
