= Engelbert Zaschka =

20th-century German engineer and aviation pioneer

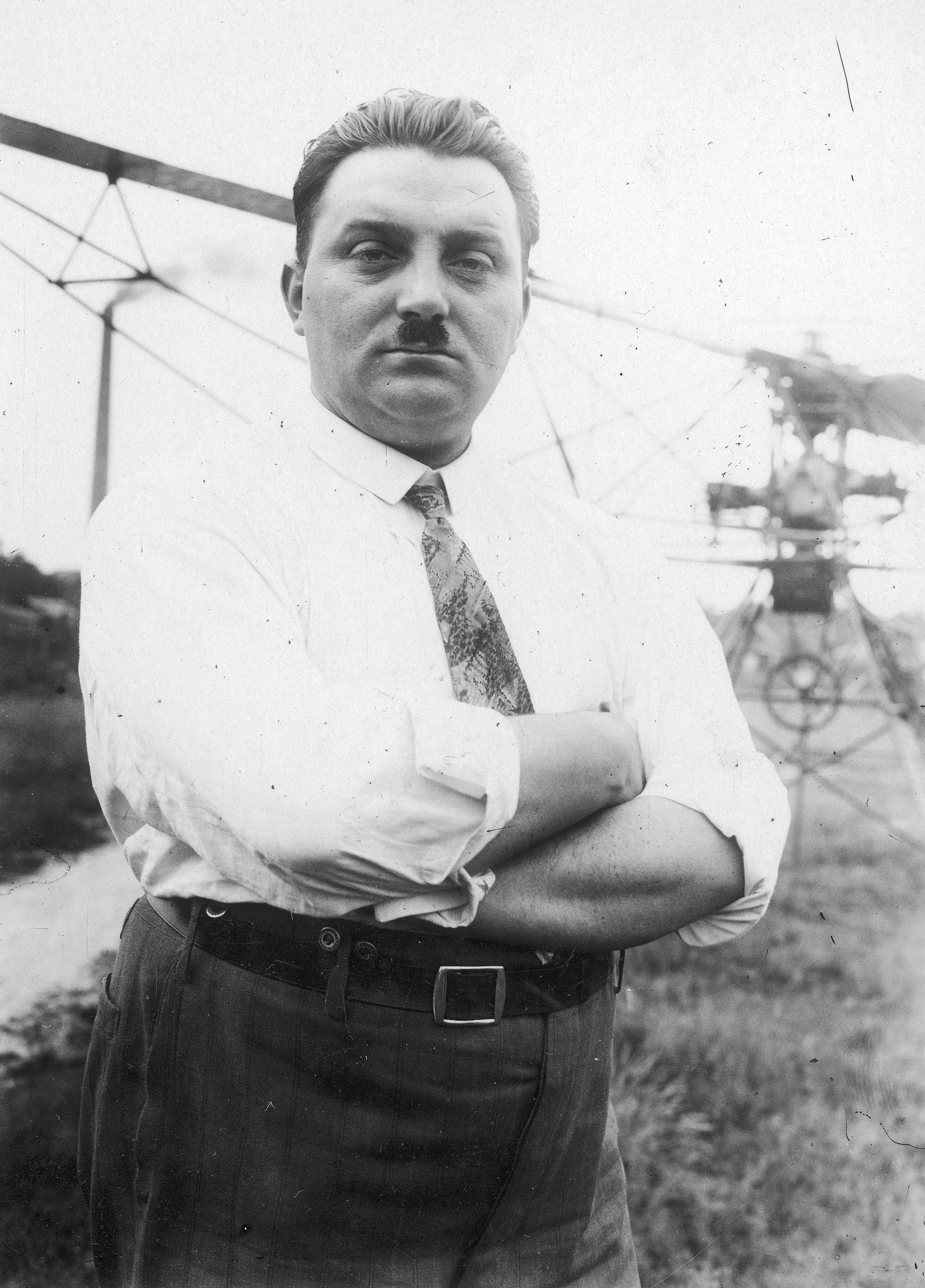
- Inventor Engelbert Zaschka with his first helicopter model "Z I", Berlin 1927
- Born: 1 September 1895; Freiburg im Breisgau
- Died: 26 June 1955 (aged 59); Freiburg im Breisgau
- Resting place: Freiburg im Breisgau
- Occupations: Engineer, Inventor
- Known for: Helicopter, human-powered aircraft, automobile engineering
- Title: Chief Engineer, Chief Designer, Inventor

Signature
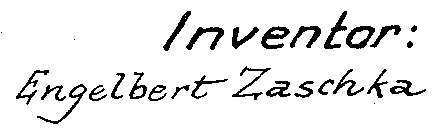

Engelbert Zaschka (1 September 1895 in Freiburg im Breisgau, Germany – 26 June 1955 in Freiburg im Breisgau, Germany) was a German chief engineer, chief designer and inventor. Zaschka is one of the first German helicopter pioneers and he is a pioneer of flying with muscle power and the folding car. Zaschka devoted himself primarily to aviation and automotive topics, but his work was not limited to them.

Engelbert Zaschka is a prominent representative of the rotary aircraft, a class of rotorcraft systems – according to Zaschka. In 1928/1929 Zaschka developed and constructed the first collapsible and foldable small car (folding car) and in 1934 an early muscle-powered airplane.

== Biography ==
Engelbert Zaschka came from a family of musicians, his father Wenzel taught zither and played in the Freiburg City Orchestra, his mother Emilie, née Rombach, was a singer; he was the second oldest of four children. He grew up in the Scheffelstraße and in the Bürgerwehrstraße, where his father had the tenement house no. 11 built in art nouveau style in 1910. At the age of 14 he applied for his first patent, founded a "hobby flying club" in Freiburg-Wiehre and allegedly made his first flying attempts at the Freiburg Schlossberg. After attending the "Höhere Bürgerschule" in Freiburg, he went to Altenburg to study engineering. Afterwards he worked as an engineer at Rheinmetall in Düsseldorf and went to Berlin in 1916. There he worked as chief designer at Orion Aktiengesellschaft für Motorfahrzeuge. In the 1930s and 1940s Zaschka was employed by the aircraft manufacturer Henschel. In Berlin, he was registered in 1926 in the Neukölln district of Lichtenrader Straße 59, in 1929 in Selchower Straße 15/16 near Tempelhofer Flugfeld, in 1934 in Flughafenstraße 21 and in 1943 in Weserstraße 34a. After the Second World War, he settled again in Freiburg im Breisgau, where he operated a workshop (vehicle factory. family bicycles or Zaschka vehicle factory) at Türkenlouisstraße 47. Zaschka died on 26 June 1955 in his hometown Freiburg im Breisgau.

Zaschka became one of the first German helicopter pioneers. His machine is a striking representative of the Rotationsflugzeug (Zaschka calls it "rotating airplane"). Chief Engineer Engelbert Zaschka pursued in 1929 in Berlin, the approach of the folding-Zaschka three-wheeler. This city car concept was aimed to be cost effective and space saving by the vehicle could be folded after use sparingly. In 1934 Engelbert Zaschka completed a large human-powered aircraft. He was an inventor who held numerous international patents as it related to the helicopter.

== Engineering Activities ==
=== Zaschka Helicopter ===
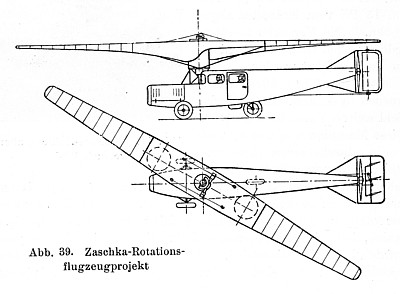
Zaschka-Rotationsflugzeug (Zaschka Rotary-Wing Airplane)

In 1927 Engelbert Zaschka of Berlin built a helicopter, equipped with two rotors, in which a gyroscope was used to increase stability and serves as an energy accumulator for a gliding flight to make a landing. Gliding in this case means a straight descent. He wanted to develop an efficient propeller drive. A swivelling propeller at the rear provided propulsion and rudder control. The machine was a combination of an autogyro and a helicopter. The principal advantage of the machine, Zaschka says, is in its ability to remain motionless in the air for any length of time and to descend in a vertical line, so that a landing may be accomplished on the flat roof of a large house. In appearance, the helicopter does not differ much from the ordinary monoplane, but the carrying wings revolve around the body.

=== Zaschka Human-Power Aircraft (1934) ===
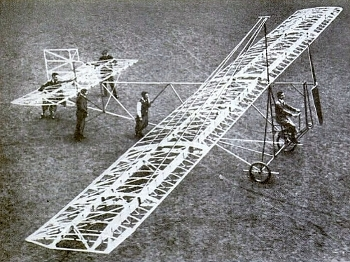
Zaschka Human-Power Aircraft, Berlin 1934

In 1934 Engelbert Zaschka completed a large human-powered aircraft, the Zaschka Human-Power Aircraft. Zaschka constructed the large human-powered tractor monoplane with a narrow wing spanning about 66 feet (20 metres). On 11 July 1934 he flew his large human-powered aircraft, the Zaschka Human-Power Aircraft, about 20 meters at Berlin's Tempelhof Airport without assisted take off.

=== Motorcycle: The German Orionette (1921–1925) ===
From 1921 till 1925 the design department of Orionette AG für Motorfahrzeuge in Berlin (Berlin SO 26, Oranienstr. 6), headed by Engelbert Zaschka, also produced some interesting unorthodox designs. Orionette is a historic German motorcycle brand.

=== Folding Zaschka Three-wheeler (1929) ===
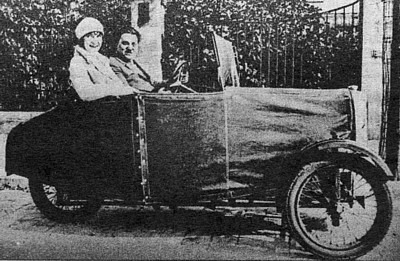
Folding City Car: Zaschka Three-wheeled car, 1929

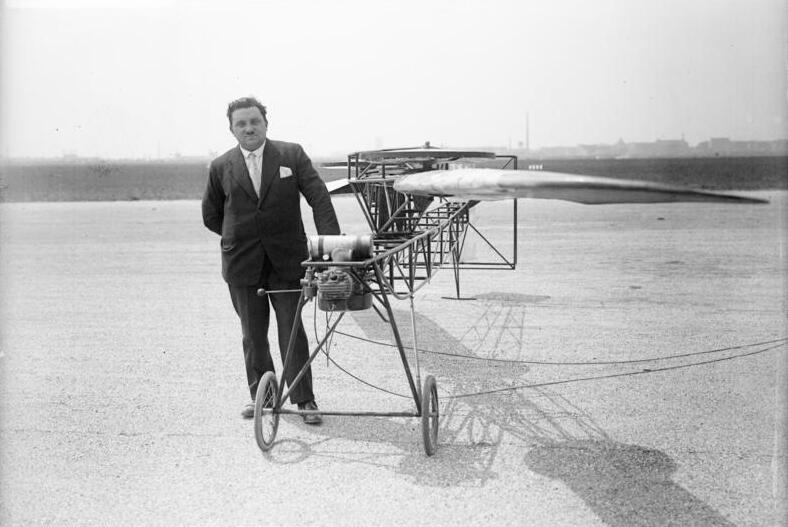
Engelbert Zaschka with model of the gyroplane, 1928

The space and parking problems of the metropolitan areas were recognized in the 1920s. In 1929 Engelbert Zaschka invented a three-wheeled car in Berlin. Zaschka's car was a folding three-wheeler, designed so that it could be taken apart within 20 minutes. The car could be "knocked down" into three main sections. It was capable of a speed of 25 to 30 miles an hour. Aspects of Zaschka's car were important to U.S. inventor and architect Richard Buckminster Fuller in the development of his Dymaxion car in 1933.

== Reception ==
His [Engelbert Zaschka’s] plane, the first helicopter, which ever worked so successfully in miniature, not only rises and descends vertically, but is able to remain stationary at any height. German airplane experts assert that such a flight as that of Captain [Charles] Lindbergh's from New York to Paris would not even be a feat for Zaschka's plane when it was perfected. […] Herr Zaschka is fully aware that the perfection of his invention will be the greatest forward step in aviation since the Wright brothers made their historical hop. As he pointed out, the danger of flying would immediately be decreased by at least 80 percent, since four fifths of the accidents in flying occur either in the takeoff or in landing. […] A motor giving thirty to forty horsepower is installed in Zaschka's present experimental machine. It is so delicately adjusted that he has been able to keep the plane at a height of several feet above the ground, with no movement either up or down.

— German Plane Promises New Stunts in Air, The Bee. Danville, Virginia, USA, 25 June 1927, p. 16

== Composer ==
As a composer, Engelbert Zaschka created popular music, including Slavoma - Der neuste Tanz (1925), which was recorded at least twice: by the orchestra Bernard Etté and the saxophone orchestra Dobbri under the direction of Otto Dobrindt. Furthermore, he wrote and composed the hit Wer hat denn bloß den Hering am Schlips mir festgemacht (literally, "Who just fastened the herring to my tie?" (1928).

== Patents ==
- DE 573961 „Hubschraubenflugzeug“ issue date 19 June 1926
- GB 272962 „Improvements in or relating to Helicopter Flying Machines“ issue date 20 June 1927
- US 1779524 „Helicopter“ issue date 29 June 1927
- DE 512513 „Triebwerk fuer Maschinen mit hin und her gehenden Kolben, deren Pleuelstangen durch auf der Triebwelle sitzende Exzenterscheiben betaetigt werden“ issue date 12 November 1927
- US 1944052 „Portable power plant.“ issue date 21 April 1930
- FR 1019111 „Bicyclette.“ issue date 26 May 1950

== Publication ==
- Zaschka, Engelbert. Drehflügelflugzeuge. Trag- und Hubschrauber. Berlin-Charlottenburg: C.J.E. Volckmann Nachf. E. Wette. 1936. ASIN B001PE5XZ2.

One of the first publications about helicopters. It is written in 1936 for airplane designers, as well as supporters of the rotary-wing aircraft construction.

== Gallery ==
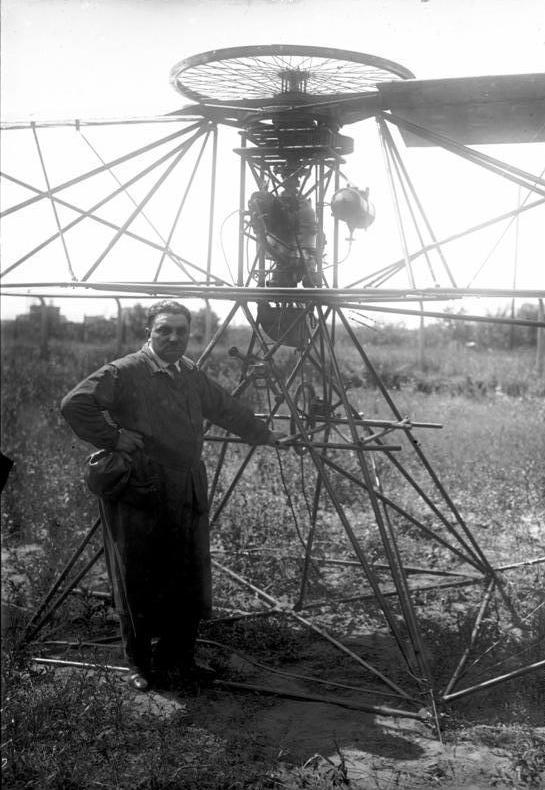
Engelbert Zaschka and his Rotary Wing system, 1927

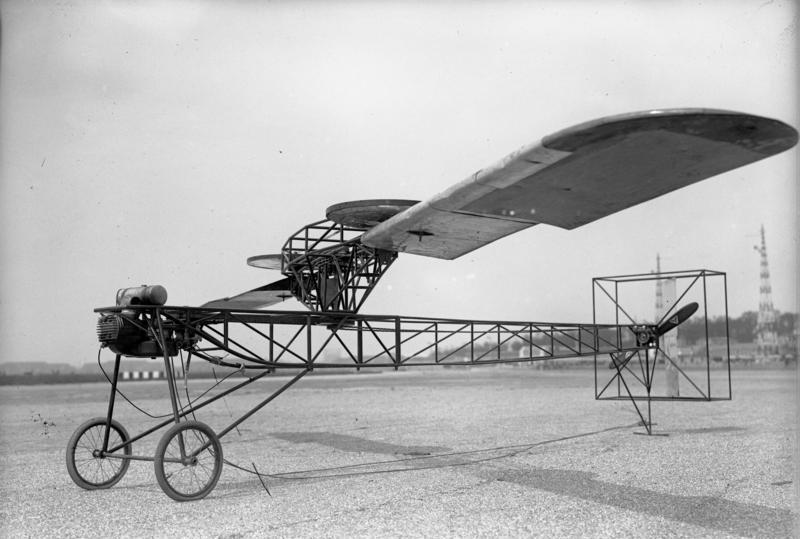
Zaschka helicopter, 1928

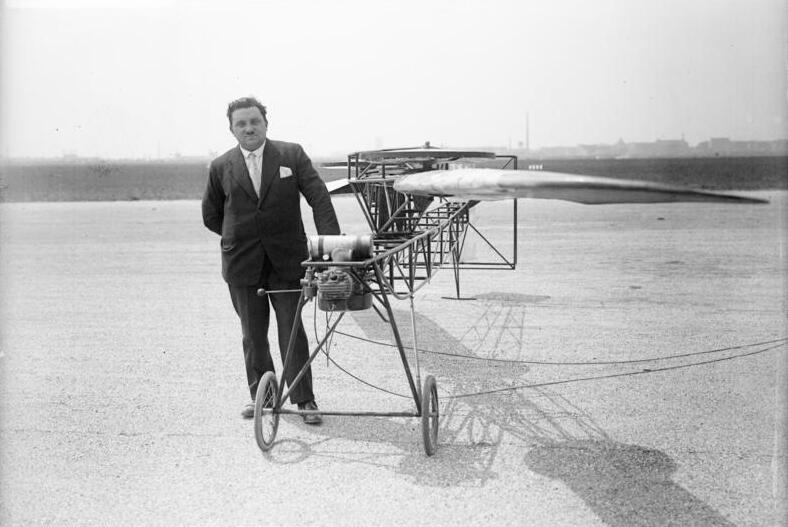
Engelbert Zaschka and helicopter, 1928

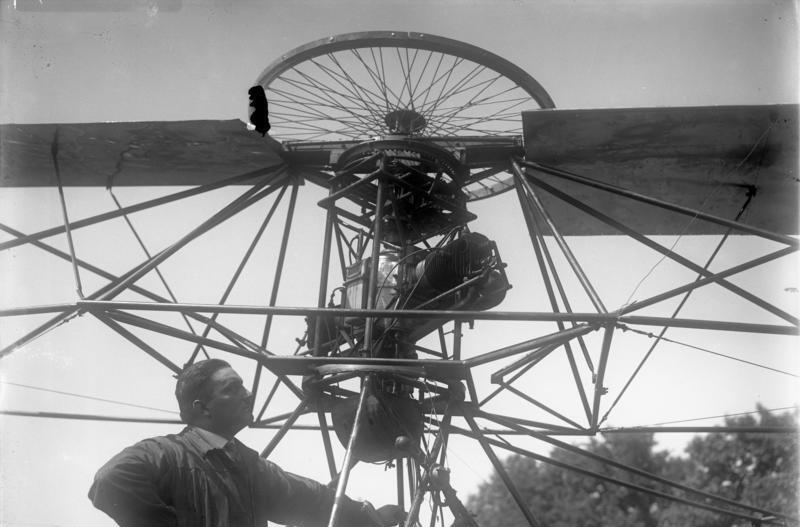
Zaschka Rotary Wing system, 1927

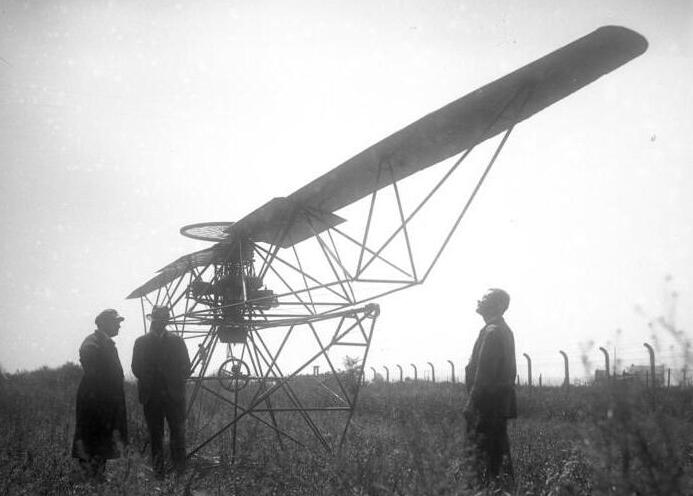
Zaschka Rotary Wing system, 1927

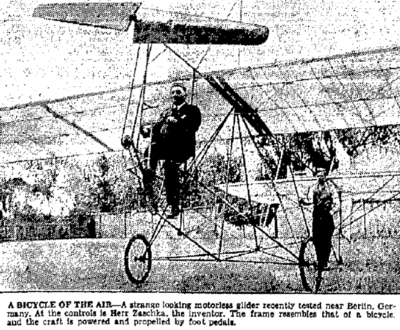
Zaschka Human-Powered Aircraft and inventor, Berlin 1934

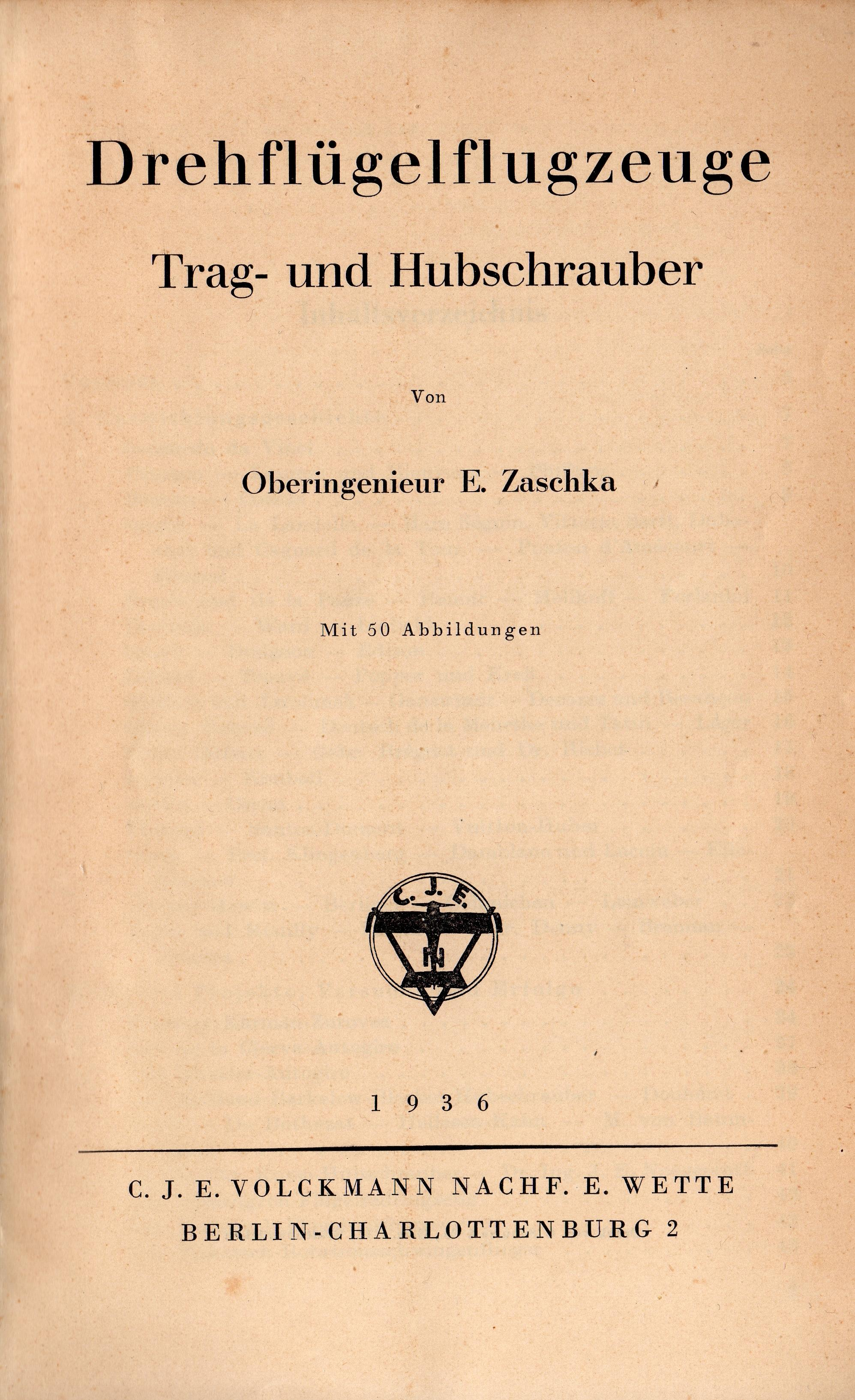
Drehflügelflugzeuge. Trag- und Hubschrauber. C.J.E. Volckmann Nachf. E. Wette, Berlin-Charlottenburg 1936

== Bibliography ==
- Fay, John Foster. The Helicopter: History, Piloting and How It Flies. David & Charles PLC. 1976.
- Reay, David Anthony. The history of man-powered flight. Oxford/New York: Pergamon Press. 1977.
- Nowarra, Heinz J. German Helicopters 1928-1945. Schiffer Publishing. 1991.
- Besser, Rolf. Technik und Geschichte der Hubschrauber: Von Leonardo da Vinci bis zur Gegenwart. Bonn: Bernard & Graefe Verlag. 1996.
- Grosser, Morton. Gossamer Odyssey: The Triumph of Human-powered Flight. Zenith Press. 2004.

== TV documentary in which Zaschka is treated ==
Große Ideen – kleine Flops: Geistesblitze von A bis Z. Documentary, Germany, 2016, 90 minutes, authors: Andreas Kölmel and Jürgen Vogt; Production: SWR Fernsehen, German premiere: 16 May 2016; Information about the documentary.

== See also ==
- List of rotorcraft
- Human-powered aircraft
- Three-wheeled car
