= Talk Radio (XM) =

- Broadcast area: United States
- Frequency: XM 246
- Branding: Talk Radio

Programming
- Format: Talk radio
- Affiliations: Fox Sports Radio; USA Radio Network

Ownership
- Owner: Clear Channel Communications

History
- First air date: 2001
- Former frequencies: XM channel 165 (2001–2011); XM channel 168 (2011–2013); XM channel 246 (2013)

Talk Radio was a talk radio channel available on XM Satellite Radio. Owned by Clear Channel Broadcasting, Inc., Talk featured terrestrial radio show simulcasts and tape delay broadcasts from across the United States. Advertising sales are handled by Premiere Networks.

From 2001 to 2013, Talk Radio was one of eleven Clear Channel stations broadcast over XM Satellite Radio. During the second quarter of fiscal year 2013, Clear Channel sold off its ownership stake in Sirius XM Radio. As a result of the sale, nine of Clear Channel's eleven XM stations, including Talk Radio, ceased broadcast over XM Satellite Radio on October 18, 2013.

== Ask! (2001-2006) ==
Ask! had always been an oddball in the XM talk lineup, trying to cater to the advice shows out there while at the same time not having enough of said subgenre of talk radio and having an overabundance of the other. While Ask! did carry plenty of experts/advice related shows like Dave Ramsey, Dr. Dean Edell, Coast to Coast AM, and Bruce Williams, other shows on the lineup like Paul Finebaum, G. Gordon Liddy's show and The Ed Schultz Show have never meshed too well with the rest of the lineup. Previously, XM channel 167 only carried part of The Ed Schultz Show and part of The Randi Rhodes Show, but to make room so that both left-wing shows could enjoy a full live show with only one liberal talk channel on the platform, Ask!'s Dr. Laura was moved over to America Right, despite not being a real right wing talk show, and was replaced with Ed Schultz on Ask!. For roughly a year, Ask! was often referred to in promos as Clear Channel 165. Eventually, the company realized that the name Ask! was becoming more irrelevant to the channel's content, and the name was changed.

== Talk Radio (2006-) ==
On April 17, 2006, Ask! changed its name to Talk Radio, and there was a significant lineup change the following month. Glenn Beck was swapped with G. Gordon Liddy on America Right. Minor weekend shows were swapped and shuffled. Tomorrow with Dave Graveline moved over to America Right, but Matt Drudge's program came over to Talk Radio. The channel also debuted a live morning show, The War Room with Quinn and Rose, which replaced the Coast to Coast AM replay. Dr. Dean Edell was moved to weekends on Extreme XM, while Finebaum was dropped from XM altogether. In place of Edell, XM 165 welcomed Ian Punnett's edition of Coast to Coast AM. Punnett made his channel debut broadcasting from the XM Satellite Radio studios in Washington, D.C. that weekend.

In mid-August 2006, Dave Ramsey finally got an afternoon drive timeslot, moving Ed Schultz to Extreme XM. Some people even switched to Sirius to hear the show live, which didn't last when Sirius removed their Sirius Advice channel. Ramsey's old timeslot was filled by a replay of the recently syndicated Mike McConnell. In the same month, Jesse Jackson and Bill Handel's weekend syndicated programs moved to Extreme XM. Weekends also welcomed Bob Costas' new program, Costas on the Radio, which began in September 2006. Beginning Monday October 2, 2006, USA Radio Network had their news coverage dropped in favor of news from 700 WLW and Fox Sports Radio's "Fox Sports Report." The :30 news portions are produced by Clear Channel Worldwide News.

In May 2007, XM received a cease and desist over comments made on The War Room with Quinn and Rose regarding comments attributed to Howard Dean. The Democratic National Committee asserted that the conversation quoted on the program did not occur, and that the reporting was defamatory. XM responded to the cease and desist order saying that they are not responsible for content on channels programmed by Clear Channel, and that further issues should be taken up with the show and Clear Channel.

On November 19, 2007, Bruce Williams and Quinn and Rose were moved off of Talk Radio 165, and went to a new talk channel, America's Talk on XM 158. In their places came reruns of the Mike McConnell show and Coast to Coast AM respectively. This was the first time Coast to Coast has had a complete morning replay on 165 since May 2006.

=== 2009 ===
March 2009 brought in a very large schedule overhaul. Mike McConnell's weekday program was erased from the schedule, and the weekend program tape-delayed to Sunday. The weekday lineup included Glenn Beck, Dave Ramsey, the recently syndicated Jason Lewis, Dr. Dean Edell, and 11 hours of Coast to Coast AM. Ramsey's show was moved to mid-days, with another program segment moved to America's Talk afternoons 3-6, splitting the live program between two channels. Weekends added The Capital Hill Blues, a show exiled from Sirius XM's P.O.T.U.S. after the merger, Real Estate Today, Glenn Beck's weekend program, and John Batchelor. The Group Room and Ron Wilson's gardening program were both moved to America's Talk, with Group Room on a delayed basis.

In late April, Premiere Radio announced the hiring of Randi Rhodes, a popular liberal talk show host who left her previous syndicator Nova M Radio, which ceased operations shortly afterwards. Randi's program was added to Talk Radio, in place of the existing Glenn Beck replay, on May 11. Randi's show has broadcast on XM for years on their liberal talk channel, America Left, which now runs Thom Hartmann's program in her old slot.

== 2013: Clear Channel sells stake ==
Talk Radio was one of eleven channels produced by Clear Channel for broadcast on XM Satellite Radio. Other Clear Channel XM stations included: America's Talk, Extreme Talk, ReachMD, and Sixx Sense; as well as simulcasts of Fox Sports Radio, KIIS-FM, WGCI-FM, WHTZ, WLTW, and WSIX-FM. During the second quarter of fiscal year 2013, Clear Channel sold off its ownership stake in Sirius XM Radio. As a result of the sale, nearly all of Clear Channel's XM stations, including Talk Radio, ceased broadcast over XM Satellite Radio on October 18, 2013. Only KIIS-FM and WHTZ continued on through their respective simulcasts, while also expanding to the Sirius Satellite Radio service. According to Radio Insight, all of Clear Channel's other XM stations were originally scheduled to depart the satellite service on August 28, 2013. However, the online newsletter Tom Taylor Now speculated these other stations were to remain on XM until "sometime in October" due to commitments to advertisers.

== Personalities ==
=== Current ===
- Glenn Beck - A popular mid-morning talk show host, currently third most popular in America with adults 25-54 according to the Fall Arbitron book. The show is syndicated by Premiere Radio Networks.
- Mike McConnell - Hosts a weekend mid-day show syndicated by Premiere Radio Networks.
- Randi Rhodes - Host of a liberal focused PM drive talk show. Randi's show was originally on America Left, while being syndicated by Air America Media and Nova M Radio. In April 2009, she joined Premiere Radio Networks, the current syndicator.
- Dr. Dean Edell - Host of daily medical advice show. This hour-long program is syndicated by Premiere Radio Networks.
- Dave Ramsey - Host of The Dave Ramsey Show, a weekday afternoon financial advice show. The show has been growing fast since the end of 2005, now syndicated to over 400 stations. The show is self-syndicated.
- Jason Lewis - Host of the evening program, "The Jason Lewis Show," syndicated by Premiere Radio Networks.
- George Noory - Host of Coast to Coast AM Monday through Friday nights. Coast to Coast AM is currently the most listened to overnight talk show in America. The show is syndicated by Premiere Radio Networks.
- Gary Sullivan - Host of At Home with Gary Sullivan which airs live weekend mid-mornings. The show is syndicated by Premiere Radio Networks.
- Bob Costas - Famous sportscaster and host of the recently launched Costas on the Radio, which is syndicated by Premiere Radio Networks.
- Ian Punnett - Host of the Saturday evening edition of Coast to Coast AM, syndicated by Premiere Radio Networks.
- Art Bell - The weekend overnight host, and original creator, of Coast to Coast AM, syndicated by Premiere Radio Networks.
- Bill Cunningham - 23-year popular midwest talk show host, he replaced Matt Drudge in this time slot in October 2007.
- Gil Gross - The host of Real Estate Today, a weekly radio show backed by the National Association of Realtors. It's produced by Media Syndication Services and distributed by Premiere Radio Networks.
- Alex Jones - Jones is the host of The Alex Jones Show, which is broadcast on Saturday evenings. The show is a re-broadcast of Friday's program, as the show is heard weekdays from 11-3 PM Eastern. The show is distributed by Genesis Communications Network.
- Lou Scatigna - Author and host of The Financial Physician, a show heard Sunday evenings exclusively on XM Radio. Scatigna also hosts a separate local show for 1160 AM WOBM in New Jersey.
- George Knapp - Host of the Sunday evening edition of Coast to Coast AM, syndicated by Premiere Radio Networks.

=== Former ===
- Ed Schultz - Mid-day liberal talk show host who used to do afternoon drives on 165. He was soon moved to broken timeslots on Extreme XM, until XM took him back on their Air America 167 channel.
- Bill Handel - Saturday morning host of Handel on the Law. Show moved to Extreme XM.
- Jesse Jackson - Sunday morning host of Keep Hope Alive. Show moved to Extreme XM.
- G. Gordon Liddy - Mid-morning conservative talk show host. Show moved to America Right.
- Paul Finebaum - Evening host of hour-long Alabama based talk show. The show was dropped from XM Radio in 2006, but would return on Sirius XM College Sports Nation.
- Dr. Laura - Former afternoon host who moved to America Right. Ed Schultz replaced her.
- Matt Drudge - Former host of The Drudge Report every Sunday night. Matt retired from his show.
- Jim Quinn & Rose Tennant - Hosts of The War Room with Quinn and Rose, a Pittsburgh-based political talk show syndicated by Clear Channel Communications-owned WPGB. This program moved to America's Talk on November 19, 2007.
- Bruce Williams - Evening host of The Bruce Williams Show, a 25-year-old business advice show. Bruce Williams is now syndicating his own program with Rocky Mountain Radio/Global American Broadcasting. The show was syndicated by the Lifestyle Talk Radio Network, after a syndication run with Westwood One. This program moved to America's Talk on November 19, 2007.
- Rollye James - Late night host of The Rollye James Show, a general topic talk show exclusive to XM since March 2008. The show now broadcasts on America's Talk.
- Ron Wilson - Host of In the Garden with Ron Wilson, a gardening show that airs early Saturday mornings. The show moved to America's Talk.
- Selma Schimmel - Host of the Sunday afternoon cancer awareness show, The Group Room, now heard on America's Talk.
- John Batchelor - Host of the Sunday evening program, The John Batchelor Show. Batchelor claims due to the changes and reorganizing made to the show (namely the change in time slot; the show now goes directly head-to-head with Bill Cunningham) that they could not retain the XM broadcast. Batchelor continued to broadcast on WABC, KFI, WMAL, and KSFO, and has returned to XM on America's Talk.

== Programming lineup ==
=== Weekdays ===
ET	PT	Show	Network	Notes
5 a.m.	2 a.m.	Coast to Coast AM with George Knapp (Mon); Coast to Coast AM with George Noory (Tue-Fri)	Premiere Radio Networks	Replay
9 a.m.	6 a.m.	Glenn Beck	Premiere Radio Networks	Live
12 p.m.	9 a.m.	Dave Ramsey	The Dave Ramsey Show	Tape, hours 2-3
2 p.m.	11 a.m.	Dave Ramsey	The Dave Ramsey Show	Live, hour 1.
3 p.m.	12 p.m.	Randi Rhodes	Premiere Radio Networks	Live
6 p.m.	3 p.m.	America Now with Andy Dean	Premiere Radio Networks	Live
9 p.m.	6 p.m.	Brett Winterble	Brandon D'Amore Networks	Live
10 p.m.	7 p.m.	Coast to Coast AM with George Noory	Premiere Radio Networks	"Early Edition" Refeed
1 a.m.	10 p.m.	Coast to Coast AM with George Noory	Premiere Radio Networks	Live

=== Saturdays (as of 2012-06-23) ===
ET	PT	Show	Network	Notes
5 a.m.	2 a.m.	Coast to Coast AM with George Noory	Premiere Radio Networks	Replay
9 a.m.	6 a.m.	At Home with Gary Sullivan	Premiere Radio Networks	Live. The fourth hour is not syndicated, and is exclusive to 55KRC.
12 p.m.	9 a.m.	The Weekend	Premiere Radio Networks	Live
3 p.m.	12 p.m.	Rich Dad Radio with Robert & Kim Kiyosaki	Rich Dad/ Premiere Satellite Radio	Pre-recorded
4 p.m.	1 p.m.	Both Sides Now with Arianna Huffington and Mary Matalin	Lifestyle TalkRadio Network	Pre-recorded
3 p.m.	12 p.m.	The Moll Anderson Show	Premiere Satellite Radio	Pre-recorded
6 p.m.	3 p.m.	David Essel Alive!	Premiere Satellite Radio	Live
9 p.m.	6 p.m.	Somewhere in Time with Art Bell	Premiere Radio Networks	Art Bell archive shows
1 a.m.	10 p.m.	Coast to Coast AM with John B. Wells	Premiere Radio Networks	Live

=== Sundays (as of 2012-06-24) ===
ET	PT	Show	Network	Notes
5 a.m.	2 a.m.	Coast to Coast AM with Ian Punnett	Premiere Radio Networks	Replay
9 a.m.	6 a.m.	At Home with Gary Sullivan	Premiere Radio Networks	Live
12 p.m.	9 a.m.	The Financial Physician with Lou Scatigna	TheFinancialPhysician.com/ Premiere Satellite Radio	Live
1 p.m.	10 a.m.	Real Estate Today	Media Syndication Services / Premiere Radio Networks	Pre-recorded
3 p.m.	12 p.m.	Glenn Beck Weekend	Premiere Radio Networks	Best-of
5 p.m.	2 p.m.	The Jack Abramoff Radio Show	Premiere Satellite Radio	Live
7 p.m.	4 p.m.	Coast to Coast AM: The Best of George Noory	Premiere Radio Networks	Best-of
10 p.m.	7 p.m.	Bill Cunningham	Premiere Radio Networks	Live
1 a.m.	10 p.m.	Coast to Coast AM with George Knapp	Premiere Radio Networks	Live
