= Nashville! =

- Broadcast area: United States
- Frequency: XM 57
- Branding: Nashville! cm

Programming
- Format: Country music

Ownership
- Owner: Clear Channel Communications
- Sister stations: KISS-XM, Mix, Music Summit, Extreme Talk, National Lampoon Comedy Radio, ReachMD, America's Talk, Sixx Sense, Talk Radio, Fox Sports Radio

History
- First air date: 2001-09-25

Technical information
- Class: Satellite Radio Station

Nashville! was a commercial radio channel on XM Satellite Radio. It was located on XM 57(previously 11) and plays a wide range of country music hits from the early 1990s through today. The channel was programmed out of Cincinnati, Ohio. Advertising sales are handled by Premiere Radio Networks. It was programmed by Kent Terry.

On June 8, 2011, it was replaced by a simulcast of WSIX-FM in Nashville, Tennessee.

== Programs/Personalities ==
- After Midnite with Blair Garner - The show now runs from midnight to 6 AM ET and is syndicated by Premiere Radio Networks.
- Big D and Bubba - Heard mornings from 6-10 AM ET and is syndicated by Premiere Radio Networks.
- Tony Lama - Heard mornings from 10-12PM on XM 11. Tony is based out of Colorado Springs, Colorado.
- Drew Thomas - Afternoons from 12-2PM ET.
- Bama, Rob, & Heather - Nashville!'s weekday afternoon show. The trio is based out of KASE-FM in Austin, Texas, but produce a separate, more music intensive show for XM. The two shows will sometimes share content, such as guest interviews. This show was originally in mornings, and has since moved to 2-6 PM ET.
- Nashville Saturday Night - Live request show on Saturdays at 8 PM Eastern.
- NEW! Discover and Uncover - New unsigned country music show, originating from Clear Channel Radio's iHeartRadio digital network. Heard Sunday mornings at 6 AM Eastern.
- Crook & Chase Countdown - Sunday mornings at 9 AM Eastern. This show replaced the Foxworthy Countdown after it ceased broadcasting.

== WSIX (2001-2003) ==
As part of the operational assistance agreement with Clear Channel Communications, XM agreed to simulcast some of their FM radio stations. WSIX was one of those channels, simulcasting the FM station from Nashville, Tennessee. At that time, channel 11 was known as WSIX, named after its call letters. With a low subscription count, the audience didn't pay much attention to the Nashville origin of the station. In 2004, XM decided to go commercial-free, leading to WSIX being removed from the XM platform. It was replaced by a new XM exclusive channel called Nashville!, which had a similar format.

In May 2006, the WSIX simulcast was returned to XM Satellite Radio (on XM 161) as Clear Channel's 5th commercial music channel, separate from Nashville!, only to be removed from the service again in August 2008.

== Nashville! (2003- ) ==
On 2003-12-01, the WSIX simulcast ended. The station was now on autopilot 24/7 with no jocks. One month later, the station dropped all commercial advertising, much against Clear Channel's wishes. Clear Channel stuck around while companies like Univision pulled their channels off the XM platform.

Nashville! logo from 2006-2009.

In March 2006, according to a 10-k filing, XM Satellite Radio mentioned that Clear Channel programmed music on XM would begin carrying commercials, including Nashville!. This has been done to fulfill an arbitration settlement between XM and Clear Channel. In response to this, XM Canada, DirecTV and AOL Radio removed this channel on 4/17/06 in favor of XM's commercial free equivalent, US Country. Nashville! now displays a "cm" next to its name on the XM unit's pad data to indicate that it is a commercial radio station. For a short period of time, Nashville! did not display song information on the XM unit's pad. Originally, Clear Channel opted to have static pad data on all of its channels, but due to complaints they acquired the hardware to properly display individual track information on the units.

=== Grand Ole Opry joins ===
In September 2007, XM Radio announced that the country music institution, the Grand Ole Opry, would begin broadcasting live three times a week on Nashville!, with performance encores on America. The Opry broadcast for years on rival Sirius Satellite Radio, which carried a simulcast of Opry flagship station, WSM in Nashville. Sirius' broadcast ended in September 2006 without warning, and Sirius claimed that the decision to drop the station and the Grand Ole Opry was mutual.

On October 20, Nashville! broadcast its first Grand Ole Opry concert, which was also on the Opry's 82nd birthday celebration. The concerts air every Tuesday, Friday and Saturday night.

=== Additional programming ===
In August 2008, following suit to sister station KISS-XM, Nashville! added new personalities to the lineup. The jocks were rather scarce, and had longer shifts. Bama & Rob started in mornings, with Cindy Spicer in afternoons. These jock shifts were, and remain voice-tracked. Coincidentally, this same month contained the departure of WSIX-FM from the XM dial, which would keep syndicated hosts Big D and Bubba and Blair Garner off XM for another year. In 2009, the channel became a lot more open with its audience, adding MySpace and Facebook pages, and later a Twitter account. The Nashville program director and personalities actively communicate to listeners on these social networking services. The channel also introduced a feedback number for listeners to call.

In August 2009, the lineup was altered once again. This time, Premiere Radio's Big D and Bubba, and Blair Garner, were added to the channel in their live morning and overnight timeslots respectively. Drew Thomas and Tony Lama were added to mid-days, and morning team Bama, Rob & Heather were moved to afternoons. Evenings remained jockless.

In late September 2009, Sirius XM did not renew their shared agreement with Clear Channel over the Grand Ole Opry broadcasts, and instead opted to keep the shows to themselves for delayed broadcasts on The Roadhouse XM 10. The announcement was not a surprise, as Sirius XM had barred any promotion of the Opry on Nashville! since the programming merger in November 2008. The timeslot once occupied by the Saturday night Opry broadcasts has since been replaced by a new show.

On June 8, 2011, Clear Channel began once again, simulcasting WSIX-FM Nashville on Nashville's signal on XM 57.
