= America's Talk =

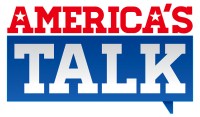
- United States

Programming
- Format: Talk radio

Ownership
- Owner: Clear Channel Broadcasting, Inc.

History
- First air date: November 19, 2007
- Last air date: October 18, 2013
- Former frequencies: XM channel 158 (2007–2011); XM channel 166 (2011–2013); XM channel 244 (2013)

America's Talk was a talk radio channel available exclusively on iHeartRadio. Owned by Clear Channel Broadcasting, Inc., America's Talk featured terrestrial radio show simulcasts and tape delay broadcasts from across the United States. Advertising sales were handled by Premiere Networks.

From 2007 to 2013, America's Talk was one of eleven Clear Channel stations broadcast over XM Satellite Radio. During the second quarter of fiscal year 2013, Clear Channel sold off its ownership stake in Sirius XM Radio. As a result of the sale, nine of Clear Channel's eleven XM stations, including America's Talk, ceased broadcast over XM Satellite Radio on October 18, 2013.

== History ==
America's Talk launched on November 19, a week delayed after November 12. It included a weekday lineup consisting of the new-to-XM Sally Jessy Raphael show Talknet, named after the old NBC Talknet. The rest of the lineup consisted of shows moved from other channels, and replays. Arriving on the weekday lineup from XM 165 were Jim Quinn and Bruce Williams, still played live mornings and evenings. The weekend lineup mainly consisted of weekend shows moved over from XM 152, including Bill Handel, Leo Laporte, and Dr. Dean Edell who was also heard on weekdays. Replays of Glenn Beck and Rollye James from XM 165 filled out mid-days and overnights on XM 158. The channel also intended to include WFLZ-FM's The MJ Morning Show in mid-days, syndicated by Clear Channel, but it was not launched.

America's Talk also introduced afternoon drive replays of popular weekend shows from itself and channel 165. The replayed shows were hosted by Bill Cunningham (Sunday nights), Gary Sullivan (Saturday mornings), Leo Laporte (Saturday afternoons), Ron Wilson (early Saturday mornings), and Bill Handel (Saturday mornings). The America's Talk lineup stayed the same until March 2008, when the pet talk program Animal Radio was added to Saturday afternoons and replayed Sunday mornings.

On June 10, 2008, The Lifestyle Talk Radio Network announced the cancellation of Bruce Williams' radio program, which had been a part of XM Radio for five years. The next day, AllAccess.com reported Bruce's show would move to Rocky Mountain Radio, with distribution handled by Global American Broadcasting. America's Talk continues to air Bruce's program at the same time each night. Less than one month later, Sally Jessy Raphael's radio show ceased broadcasting without warning, and was immediately replaced by Dave Ramsey.

=== 2009 changes ===
In January 2009, another weekend addition was made to the lineup. The still freshly syndicated Jesus Christ Show was added every Sunday morning. A month later, the NAR's Real Estate Today was added as well.

The week of March 6, 2009, brought many changes to the America's Talk lineup and presentation. The lineup once heavily filled with replays of other shows brought on several new shows to both weekdays and weekends. New shows included Rick and Bubba, Roger Hedgecock, and Voice to America. Other shows were moved over from sister XM 165, including Dave Ramsey, Rollye James, Ron Wilson, The Group Room, and Bob Costas. The only show not retained was 2/3 of Bruce Williams' evening program. Bruce's reaction was an unhappy one, and he encouraged listeners to email feedback to him, whether it be good or bad, so he could forward it to the channel programmers. In addition to the program changes, the following Friday saw the departure of WLW's news team and the Fox Sports News segment. In its place was the IRN-USA Radio News. Dave Ramsey's time on America's Talk turned out to be short lived, as Premiere Radio introduced the Bill Handel Show to afternoons. This, as well as an earlier broadcast of Dr. Dean Edell, took Ramsey's place. However, the broadcast on XM 165 remained, putting Dave's show back in the timeslot and channel it occupied before Fall 2006.

In November 2009, the John Batchelor show was added live to the weekend lineup, giving the channel a live late-night program across the entire week. This was prior to Batchelor adding weeknights to his roster. America's Talk did not add the Monday-Friday show.

=== 2010 changes ===
In January 2010, Real Estate Today became exclusive to XM channel 165, and also left the Sirius platform entirely. Science Fantastic was moved to a live timeslot in its place.

About one month later, two more programs came to an end. First, Bruce Williams made the announcement that after nearly 35 years, he was hanging up his nationally syndicated radio show. He made the announcement two weeks in advance, until it was finally removed March 9. America's Talk replaced the remaining hour with a delayed broadcast of the final hour of the Alex Jones show from Genesis Communications Network. On the opposite end, Bill Handel voluntarily canceled his afternoon show, still in its infancy. Handel continues hosting his local morning show for KFI, as well as his weekend Handel on the Law program. The slot allowed the return of the Dave Ramsey show to afternoons, 2:00 to 5:00 p.m. Eastern, and live. Dr. Dean remained in his new 5 p.m. slot, and the Rick and Bubba show was moved earlier an hour, giving them another live hour, which originally belonged to a rerun of the first hour of Quinn and Rose.

In October 2010, Rollye James announced that Clear Channel was canceling her contract after six years of airing on XM. Clear Channel was obligated to inform her in advance, and that her show will cease broadcasting on America's Talk on March 31, 2011.

On December 1, 2010, Dr. Dean Edell announced his retirement from radio after his flagship station, KGO San Francisco, dropped the show in favor of a local news hour.

=== 2011 changes ===
In the first quarter of 2010, America's Talk's lineup was altered significantly. A live broadcast of Alex Jones was added to afternoons as Dave Ramsey was removed once again from the lineup. Dean Edell reruns continued at 4 PM, until an encore hour of Leo Laporte replaced the afternoon slot, and Dr. Daliah Wachs took over the 5 AM timeslot. For a short time, a brokered show hosted by Howard Keating ran in afternoons. This lasted for less than two months.

==== Departure of The Rollye James Show ====
The Rollye James Show, which had aired on XM Radio for 7 years in both syndication and live exclusivity across three different co-owned channels, came to an end on March 31, 2011. Rollye had informed her audience about the coming changes since Clear Channel informed her in late 2010 of her contract cancellation. Rollye had claimed on her show that Clear Channel's new programming staff had tried to find ways to get her out of the contract as early as a year prior to the deadline, but no avenues were found, and the obligation was fulfilled to the last minute. Many listeners called and emailed the programmers at Sirius XM Radio in hopes to bring the show to one of their in-house programmed channels. Rollye James has said on her show, as well as her website, that she had been floated several offers from other companies, including Sirius XM in New York City, but so far, no solid plans for return to the air have been made. However, Rollye hasn't expressed a rush in returning to the air, as she has stated on her website that "I plan to take a little while to relish doing nothing."

Following the end of the show, replays were replaced with America's Trucking Network, which had been airing live on XM 152. 9 p.m. to midnight now airs Free Talk Live from GCN. Originally David Cox's ESB Hour was slated to run, but never went through.

=== 2013: Clear Channel sells stake ===
XM logo in 2013

America's Talk was one of eleven channels produced by Clear Channel for broadcast on XM Satellite Radio. Other Clear Channel XM stations included: Extreme Talk, ReachMD, Sixx Sense, and Talk Radio; as well as simulcasts of Fox Sports Radio, KIIS-FM, WGCI-FM, WHTZ, WLTW, and WSIX-FM. During the second quarter of fiscal year 2013, Clear Channel sold off its ownership stake in Sirius XM Radio. As a result of the sale, nearly all of Clear Channel's XM stations, including America's Talk, ceased broadcast over XM Satellite Radio on October 18, 2013. Only KIIS-FM and WHTZ continued on through their respective simulcasts, while also expanding to the Sirius Satellite Radio service. According to Radio Insight, all of Clear Channel's other XM stations were originally scheduled to depart the satellite service on August 28, 2013. However, the online newsletter Tom Taylor Now speculated these other stations were to remain on XM until "sometime in October" due to commitments to advertisers.

=== 2020: America's Talk MIA ===
As of June 10, 2020, America's Talk is no longer available on iHeartRadio. Details on the channel's demise are not readily available.

== Personalities ==
=== Current ===
- Jim Quinn & Rose Tennant - Hosts of The War Room with Quinn and Rose, a Pittsburgh-based political talk show syndicated by Clear Channel-owned WPGB.
- Rick Burgess and Bill Bussey - This duo hosts the Rick and Bubba Show, an entertainment focused talk show syndicated by Syndicated Solutions.
- Alex Jones - Conspiracy theorist Alex Jones' radio program airs live mid-days on XM 158. The show is independently produced by Jones, and is syndicated by Genesis Communications Network.
- Roger Hedgecock - This conservative talk show host built a national fanbase filling in for Rush Limbaugh, and now hosts his own weeknight show, syndicated by Radio America.
- Steve Sommers - Host of America's Trucking Network and son of "The Truckin' Bozo" Dale Sommers. America's Trucking Network, currently a local show on WLW but previously heard in national syndication, airs overnights.
- Bill Handel - Host of the Saturday morning "marginal legal advice" show, Handel on the Law, syndicated by Premiere Radio Networks. Handel also hosts a local weekday morning show on KFI in Los Angeles, California.
- Hal Abrams and Judy Francis - Hosts of the Saturday afternoon pet show, Animal Radio, which has been on the air since 1999. The show can also be heard on their website at AnimalRadio.com.
- Leo Laporte - Former personality on the now defunct TechTV and G4techTV Canada, who hosts The Tech Guy, a formerly local Los Angeles, California technology talk show now syndicated by Premiere Radio Networks.
- Neil Saavedra as Jesus Christ - Host of The Jesus Christ Show, heard live Sunday mornings and syndicated by Premiere Radio Networks. Saavedra, as himself, is billed as producers.
- Ron Wilson - Host of In the Garden with Ron Wilson, a gardening show that airs early Saturday mornings, syndicated by Premiere Radio Networks.
- Tony Femino - The host of Voice to America, a weekly show that interviews people around the world and takes their views on America's state of affairs. The show is self-produced.
- Michio Kaku - The host of Science Fantastic, a weekly Saturday evening show that chronicles the developments of science and physics. The show airs live from 5 PM to 8 PM Eastern. It's syndicated by Talk Radio Network.
- Tom Kraeutler & Leslie Segrete - Hosts of the weekend home improvement show The Money Pit, syndicated by Radio America.
- John Batchelor - Host of the weekend evening program, The John Batchelor Show. Batchelor used to host a daily show, carried by the former ABC News & Talk channel on XM 124. He later debuted a Sunday night show, carried by Talk Radio XM 165. In June 2009, the show was removed due to a timeslot change and reorganizing of the show that would've forced the channel to drop Bill Cunningham's show. In November 2009, The John Batchelor Show returned to XM on America's Talk, in the late Sunday night timeslot, with a new Saturday show added. The show is syndicated by Citadel Media.
- Dr. Daliah Wachs hosts the weekday medical talk show, The Dr. Daliah Show, at 5 am and 5 pm. Dr. Daliah provides medical/health talk radio that educates listeners in an entertaining fashion. She currently has multiple terrestrial affiliates as well.

=== Former ===
- Dr. Dean Edell - In December 2010, the popular health/medical talk show host announced his retirement from radio after his flagship station (KGO) moved the long running show to weekends only, after a thirty-year run, in favor of a local news hour.
- Sally Jessy Raphael - Sally's mid-morning magazine style talk show was carried from when America's Talk launched to 8 months later, when the show abruptly ended.
- Selma Schimmel - Host of the Sunday afternoon cancer awareness show, The Group Room, produced by Take on the Day and distributed by Premiere Radio Networks. The show is currently on hiatus.
- Dave Ramsey - Host of The Dave Ramsey Show, a weekday afternoon financial advice show. The show has been growing fast since the end of 2005, now syndicated to over 400 stations. America's Talk played this program in afternoons from March 2009 to September 2009. It can still be heard in mid-days on Talk Radio XM 165. The show is self-syndicated.
- Peter Greenberg - Host of Peter Greenberg Worldwide, heard Saturdays, and distributed by Syndicated Solutions. The show was removed in November 2009.
- Bruce Williams - Former host of The Bruce Williams Show, a 35-year-old business advice show. Williams retired from his show on March 5, 2010. The show was syndicated by the Global American Broadcasting Network, after a syndication run with NBC TalkNet, Westwood One, & Lifestyle Talk Radio Network.
- Rollye James - Rollye James hosted a talk show with a slant towards conspiracies. Rollye's company, Mediatrix, produced the show. The show ended on March 31, 2011.
- Howard Keating - Host of The Keating Network, which ran for a short period of time in early 2011.
