= Extreme Talk =

- Broadcast area: United States
- Branding: Extreme Talk

Programming
- Format: Talk radio
- Affiliations: Fox Sports Radio iHeartRadio; IRN/USA Radio Network; Premiere Networks

Ownership
- Owner: iHeartMedia, Inc.
- Sister stations: America's Talk; Fox Sports Radio; Pride Radio; Sixx Sense; Trancid

History
- First air date: September 25, 2001 (via XM Satellite Radio)
- Last air date: January 5, 2015
- Former frequencies: XM channel 152 (2001–11); XM channel 165 (2011–13); XM channel 243 (2013) iHeartRadio (2013–15)

Extreme Talk was a talk radio channel available on iHeartRadio. Owned by iHeartMedia, Inc., Extreme Talk featured terrestrial radio show simulcasts and tape delay broadcasts from across the United States. The station lineup included: syndicated programs Ground Zero with Clyde Lewis, Handel on the Law, Jay Mohr Sports, Rover's Morning Glory, and The Schnitt Show; as well as local programs America's Trucking Network, The Alan Cox Show, and The Monsters in the Morning. Advertising sales were handled by Premiere Networks.

From 2001 to 2013, Extreme Talk broadcast over XM Satellite Radio. During the second quarter of fiscal year 2013, iHeartMedia (as Clear Channel) sold off its ownership stake in Sirius XM Radio. As a result of the sale, nine of Clear Channel's eleven XM stations, including Extreme Talk, ceased broadcast over XM on October 18, 2013.

== History ==
=== XM Satellite Radio ===
Extreme Talk launched in 2001 as xL Extreme XM – a showcase for different morning radio shows from across the country. A lot of shuffling went on, but for the most part the channel kept its theme for a while. Such shows as The Regular Guys, Bubba the Love Sponge, Lewis and Floorwax, Drew Garabo, The Love Doctors, and The Monsters of the Mid-day populated the lineup. As well, Clear Channel Communications added segments of Clear Channel News, which was phased out later during the run. While Extreme XM was for morning shows, Buzz XM picked up the afternoon-evening with a different variety of talk shows. Some of these shows would later appear on Extreme XM.

In 2003, Clear Channel news ended, and in the middle of the year, Lewis and Floorwax lost their PM drive slot to the third Orlando show (from the same station nonetheless) to grace the lineup: The Philips Phile. The Love Doctors also soon fell off the schedule as The Regular Guys slid into graveyard shift, allowing Bubba the Love Sponge to have complete control over morning drive. "Guys" Larry and Eric were not happy about this, and badmouthed XM and the fact that they were not paid by XM for the exposure. Having shot themselves in the foot, The Regular Guys were soon wiped clean off the XM dial. While a number of the shows on Extreme were now live, the quality still varied among listeners from show to show. Monsters, Philips, and Drew were all out of one Orlando station, and Bubba was out of nearby Tampa.

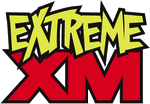
Early XM logos

2004 came, and with it came the demise of Buzz XM, as Clear Channel took it in a different direction by turning it into a conservative talk channel to complement XM's new America Left liberal talk channel. David Lawrence was added into late night shift on Extreme and Los Angeles' Phil Hendrie was moved to evenings, bouncing Drew Garabo off the lineup. With the addition of shows that weren't as "extreme," many considered why the channel was still even called Extreme XM. After the Super Bowl XXXVIII halftime controversy, the Federal Communications Commission (FCC) pressure came hard and fast, and an Extreme staple since day one, Bubba the Love Sponge, was fined for an on-air obscenity incident and subsequently fired by Clear Channel. Bubba became the poster child of the FCC, explaining to all jocks what happens when you get out of line. For a while, Extreme had to run replays of nighttime shows in the morning slot as Bubba was no longer on the air. Soon enough, Clear Channel stations dropped Howard Stern's show after another FCC fine. One of the stations fined was WTKS-FM in Orlando, carrier of Extreme's Monsters and Philips Phile. With Howard gone, the Monsters were moved into morning drive on all affiliates, and a new show emerged on both WTKS-FM and Extreme XM: The Shannon Burke Show. At the same time, former Extreme show The Regular Guys were yet another casualty of the FCC and Clear Channel on their home station WKLS.

It was Summer 2004, and Extreme XM had become a whole different entity from what it used to be. It was no longer a "Radio Crazies" channel for morning shows all over the country. The lineup now consisted of three Orlando talk shows, and three Los Angeles talk shows. Not only that, but except for The Monsters in the Morning, the lineup was completely different from the channel's origin.

2005 came, and more changes along with it. First off, ESPN's Tony Kornheiser was to begin a new late-morning show out of Washington, D.C., and Extreme had it ready for debut. In addition, G. Gordon Liddy also announced a new show coming on at the same time. Extreme planned to have both shows added to the lineup, both on tape delay, at 11 a.m. and 1 p.m. respectively. This, of course, meant the end of Shannon Burke on the lineup. Shannon did not seem too happy, and bashed XM's talk show Opie and Anthony in the process, resulting in a horde of O&A listeners pummeling Burke's program for two days. Shannon never did return, and he continues to broadcast out of WTKS-FM in Orlando. Extreme, albeit still less extreme, was beginning to branch out to other cities once again.

In mid-2005, another conflict came along between The Philips Phile and XM's own Opie and Anthony, to which Opie and Anthony accused Philips of ripping off a bit, sending listeners to call his show in the process. Philips responded with claims such as that he was the most listened to show on XM (not possible because XM does not have ratings), that Opie and Anthony had to pay to be on XM, and other comments that only caused Opie and Anthony listeners (called The Pests) to take over the phone lines for another week. Weeks later, listeners of O&A bought a billboard close to the WTKS-FM station saying in yellow letters: "Mr. Philips, The Pests Win, You Lose! Good day, sir!" After this, the battle between the two shows ended.

In late 2005, Extreme began their first original show: Left Jab, which is only one hour long and airs Sunday mornings at 9 a.m.. Despite the minuscule show and invaluable timeslot, Extreme gave it plenty of promotion. Soon, Clear Channel announced the hiring of former Cox Radio show Lex and Terry, who Clear Channel promised to add to many more stations. One of which was Extreme. Lex and Terry debuted, albeit truncated and tape delayed, on Extreme in November taking G. Gordon Liddy's slot, who was moved to Ask! at a live time. With XM's addition of the Fox News Talk channel, some extra space was available on Ask! and Air America Radio for a couple shows to occupy. On weekends from 2005 to 2006, Extreme was home to Indy Car Racing. In honor of this, XM introduced the Honda Civic Si Extreme concept car at the 2005 Specialty Equipment Manufacturers Association show, named after the channel. As of March 2006, IRL racing has been relegated to its own channel on XM145 in the Sports category. Races are also covered on sister channel America Right.

Tony Kornheiser also announced in Spring 2006 that he would be voluntarily leaving his radio show (possibly temporary) to concentrate on his Monday Night Football position at ESPN. As a result, his show was put on hiatus, and lineups shuffled accordingly. At the same time, Extreme XM found this as a convenient opportunity to conduct another lineup shuffle.

As part of the arbitration settlement between Clear Channel and XM Radio, XM decided to move all of Clear Channel's programming on the platform into Clear Channel's own facilities instead of having it programmed via XM. This meant that the nine channels that Clear Channel programs on XM would be engineered directly by the company and not by XM. Since the move, the channel has had infrequent technical difficulties.

On April 26, 2006, evening talker Phil Hendrie surprised the radio world by announcing his retirement. He claimed that he could no longer do his show under the business of terrestrial radio, and that were he to return to the radio medium, it would be a satellite broadcast. He also wanted to concentrate on his character acting for television, including the TV series Teachers, of which he plays a billed role in. He announced that his final broadcast of his radio show would be June 23, 2006. He was given well wishes by people including Matt Groening, Ann Coulter, and Howard Stern.

Extreme XM got yet another big lineup sweeping in May 2006. Nighttime show The John and Jeff Show went off the XM radio platform, and David Lawrence was moved to a tape-delayed slot on XM's Open Road channel (keep in mind Lawrence once had his own channel with replays all day). Now Extreme XM has become 100% Clear Channel content. The departure of Tony Kornheiser allowed Extreme to give Lex and Terry back the hour that they normally lose, as well as an additional hour (for whatever reason, since The Philips Phile is still missing one hour). Lex and Terry therefore moved from 1-4 p.m. to 11-4 p.m., still tape delayed. The show is also replayed in place of John and Jeff. A new addition to the channel was The Schnitt Show. The show is currently on tape delay from 7-10 p.m., while Phil Hendrie was moved to a live timeslot (albeit too little too late) from 10 p.m.-1 a.m.. Schnitt claims that his show will move to a live timeslot down the road, and with Phil Hendrie's retirement, another lineup shuffle is expected in the early summer. On May 22, the afternoons were shuffled around as Schnitt was moved to 4 p.m., ending the 3-year run of The Philips Phile on XM Radio. In the 7-10 PM slot, the station added an encore of Glenn Beck's mid-morning program, which can also be heard on Talk Radio 165. Following in Glenn Beck's steps was Rollye James, which took the Lex and Terry replay spot from 1-6 a.m. Upon the retiring of Phil Hendrie, a replay of The Schnitt Show was added into the 10-1 timeslot, making the Monsters, Lex and Terry, and Schnitt the only 3 unique shows to the channel. In late August 2006, Philips Phile returned to the lineup (albeit on tape delay), while Schnitt was moved later to support the arrival of Ed Schultz, whose show was truncated to an hour. Syndicated hosts Bill Handel and Jesse Jackson were moved off their original home, Talk Radio 165, onto Extreme. The shows, once taped on 165, now run live on 152.

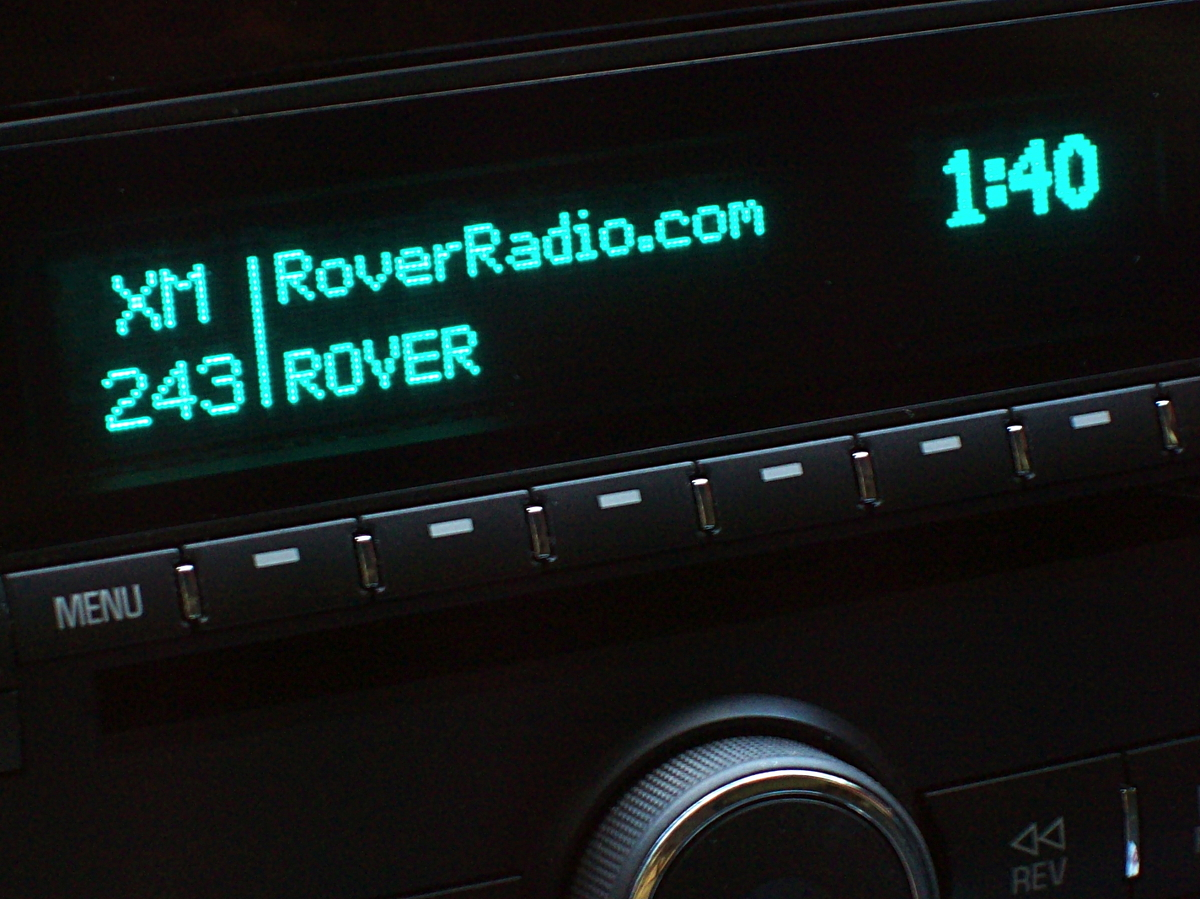
Car radio displays Program Service Data while set to Extreme Talk on XM

Beginning Monday October 2, USA Radio Network had their news coverage dropped in favor of news from 700 WLW and Fox Sports Radio's "Fox Sports Report." The :30 news portions were produced by Clear Channel Worldwide News, but have since been taken over by WLW News. Ed Schultz moved to mid-days nationally in late 2006, and beginning February 19, 2007, the show will move to noon live on XM channel 167. Right now, all weekday shows on channel 152 are tape delayed, except for the Monsters.

The week of February 26, 2007 featured more changes to Extreme's lineup, including the move of The Schnitt Show to a live timeslot. The Monsters in the Morning had their show truncated to four hours. Weekend programming also got a modification, as the newly syndicated series Leo Laporte: The Tech Guy, from Premiere Radio Networks, was added to the Extreme weekend lineup. Dr. Dean Edell has since returned to a nightly timeslot at 10 p.m. The 11 p.m. to 1 a.m. timeslot on weeknights featured The Power Hour, a brokered talk show that began on the channel in March 2007. The show ran on the channel until July 13, 2007, as they could no longer afford the timeslot.

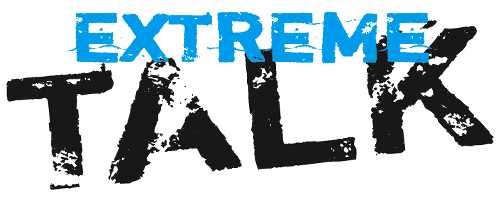
Later XM logo

In October 2007, Clear Channel announced the launching of a new XM channel, America's Talk on XM 158, which will begin on November 12. With this, it was also announced that weekend and weeknight programs on Extreme that are not The Monsters, Lex and Terry, The Schnitt Show, The Philips Phile, Jesse Jackson, or The Bald Truth would be moving to the new channel. On November 19, 2007, the new channel was launched, leaving Extreme with only six shows. Four of these shows consume the vast majority of the schedule. In November 2010, Extreme Talk added The Daily Consumer, an audio feature from ConsumerAffairs.com hosted by Stacy Cohen.

The show's lineup was kept nearly intact with the merger of XM and Sirius, with one difference. America's Trucking Network, a staple of XM's overnight programming since 2001, was brought to Extreme Talk in a live time slot (seven days per week) after moving from channel 173 (the simulcast of ATN's flagship station, WLW, which was dropped by the XM service). The show was added March 2009. Since Extreme XM was only playing repeats at that time, no programs were dropped on Extreme XM to make way for the move. America's Trucking Network has since moved to America's Talk, replaced by an overnight replay of The Bob & Tom Show. In May 2011, the station shifted from XM channel 152 to XM channel 165. In May 2013, the station shifted from XM channel 165 to XM channel 243. Lex and Terry was pulled from the station lineup in June 2013. While discussing a news story on air in which a teen boy shot a transgender female after a sexual encounter, host Lex Staley said, "I don't blame him... I would have shot his ass, too!" Staley subsequently issued an apology through his agent.

=== iHeartRadio channel ===
Extreme Talk was one of eleven channels produced by Clear Channel for broadcast on XM Satellite Radio. Other Clear Channel XM stations included: America's Talk, ReachMD, Sixx Sense, and Talk Radio; as well as simulcasts of Fox Sports Radio, KIIS-FM, WGCI-FM, WHTZ, WLTW, and WSIX-FM. During the second quarter of fiscal year 2013, Clear Channel sold off its ownership stake in Sirius XM Radio. As a result of the sale, nearly all of Clear Channel's XM stations, including Extreme Talk, ceased broadcast over XM Satellite Radio on October 18, 2013. Only KIIS-FM and WHTZ continued on through their respective simulcasts, while also expanding to the Sirius Satellite Radio service. According to Radio Insight, all of Clear Channel's other XM stations were originally scheduled to depart the satellite service on August 28, 2013. However, the online newsletter Tom Taylor Now speculated these other stations were to remain on XM until "sometime in October" due to commitments to advertisers. Extreme Talk was added to the iHeartRadio platform prior to its departure from the XM Satellite Radio service.

== Current programming ==
Show	Host(s)	Type	Flagship/home	Syndication
A. D. Rowntree	A. D. Rowntree	Talk radio	n/a	n/a (exclusive to Extreme Talk)
America's Trucking Network	Steve Sommers	Talk radio	WLW—Cincinnati	n/a (local AM radio program)
Ground Zero with Clyde Lewis	Clyde Lewis	Paranormal/conspiracy theory	KXL-FM—Portland	Premiere Networks
Handel on the Law	Bill Handel	Legal advice	KFI—Los Angeles	Premiere Networks
Jay Mohr Sports	Jay Mohr	Sports talk/entertainment	KLAC—Los Angeles	Premiere Networks
Rover's Morning Glory	Rover (Shane French)	Hot talk	WMMS—Cleveland	Syndicated by iHeartMedia
The Alan Cox Show	Alan Cox	Hot talk	WMMS—Cleveland	n/a (local FM radio program)
The Gina Grad Show	Gina Grad	Talk radio	n/a	n/a (exclusive to Extreme Talk)
The Monsters in the Morning	Russ Rollins	Hot talk	WTKS-FM—Orlando	n/a (local FM radio program)
The Schnitt Show	Todd Schnitt	Conservative talk	WHNZ—Tampa	Compass Media Networks
True Crime Radio	Tricia Griffith	Crime	n/a	n/a (Internet podcast)
