= XM Satellite Radio =

Former satellite radio company

XM Satellite Radio Holdings Inc.
- Type: Subsidiary
- Traded as: Nasdaq: XMSR
- Industry: Radio broadcasting
- Founded: 1988; 38 years ago
- Defunct: January 13, 2011; 15 years ago
- Fate: Merged with Sirius Satellite Radio in 2008, merged into SiriusXM Radio in 2011
- Successor: SiriusXM
- Headquarters: Washington, D.C., U.S.
- Products: Satellite radio
- Parent: Sirius XM Holdings
- Website: web.archive.org/web/20000301024042/http://www.xmradio.com/have.asp

XM Satellite Radio Holdings Inc. (XM) was one of the three satellite radio (SDARS) and online radio services in the United States and Canada, operated by Sirius XM Holdings. It provided pay-for-service radio, analogous to subscription cable television. Its service included 73 different music channels, 39 news, sports, talk and entertainment channels, 21 regional traffic and weather channels, and 23 play-by-play sports channels. XM channels were identified by Arbitron with the label "XM" (e.g., "XM32" for "The Bridge").

The company had its origins in the 1988 formation of the American Mobile Satellite Corporation (AMSC), a consortium of several organizations originally dedicated to satellite broadcasting of telephone, fax, and data signals. In 1992, AMSC established a unit called the American Mobile Radio Corporation dedicated to developing a satellite-based digital radio service; this was spun off as XM Satellite Radio Holdings, Inc. in 1999. The satellite service officially launched on September 25, 2001.

On July 29, 2008, XM and former competitor Sirius Satellite Radio formally completed their merger, following U.S. Federal Communications Commission (FCC) approval, forming Sirius XM Radio, Inc. with XM Satellite Radio, Inc. as its subsidiary. On November 12, 2008, Sirius and XM began broadcasting with their new, combined channel lineups. On January 13, 2011, XM Satellite Radio, Inc. was dissolved as a separate entity and merged into Sirius XM Radio, Inc.

== Services ==
While the satellite receiver radio service was its primary product, XM also operated audio, data and advertising services.

=== Satellite radio ===
XM's primary business was satellite radio entertainment. XM carried music, news (both simulcast and syndicated programming), sports, talk radio, comedy (both stand-up and radio shows), and radio drama. In addition, XM broadcast local weather and traffic conditions in its larger markets.

XM Satellite Radio logo from 2001 to 2006

=== XM Radio Online ===
XM Radio Online (XMRO), XM's Internet radio product, offered many of XM's music stations and could be accessed from any Internet connected computer, or via the SiriusXM mobile app.

=== Weather and traffic ===
XM also provided data services such as weather information for pilots and weather spotters through its SiriusXM Weather & Emergency datacasting service. This information could be displayed in the cockpit of an aircraft equipped with a satellite weather receiver.

=== Commercial adoption and partnerships ===
In 2004, JetBlue announced that XM Satellite Radio service would be available in its Embraer regional jets beginning in 2005. Also in 2005, AirTran Airways began putting XM Satellite Radio on their aircraft. United Airlines started carrying XM programming in March 2006. Zipcar, an urban car-sharing service in the United States, initially installed XM receivers in all of their vehicles, but later announced they would be removed from its fleet in the following months due to uncertainty in the market.

=== Customer service ===
In contrast to its high-quality broadcasts, Sirius/XM's customer service has drawn fire from some state governments. In October 2010, Richard Cordray, Ohio's Attorney General, began investigating complaints regarding Sirius XM's policies on billing, customer solicitation, and subscription renewals and cancellations. The company informed shareholders of the probe shortly thereafter. According to news reports, Arizona, Connecticut, Tennessee, Vermont, and the District of Columbia had expressed interest in participating in the inquiry.

According to Reuters, "The investigations come as SiriusXM, home to programs by Howard Stern and Oprah Winfrey, has found its footing and distanced itself from years of huge losses and questions about its business model."

In a report obtained in March 2011, The Better Business Bureau reported receiving over 4,500 complaints against SiriusXM in the preceding 36 months, around half of which regarded the company's billing and collection practices.

In Missouri, some people registered on the state's do-not-call list had complained about receiving repeated calls from SiriusXM workers or agents after canceling their subscriptions. Some Florida customers had reported being billed for automatic renewals of accounts they had canceled. Further, SiriusXM was sued in federal court by a customer accusing it of deceptively raising prices.

The report also stated that "Sirius, in a statement, said it was cooperating with the investigations and that it believed its 'consumer-related practices comply with all applicable federal and state laws and regulations.'"

=== Exclusive channels ===
- America's Talk
- ATN-Asian Radio
- Bollywood & Beyond
- Calendrier Sportif
- Canada 360
- ESPN Xtra
- Extreme Talk
- Faction Talk (formerly: The Opie Channel)
- Fox Sports Radio
- KISS 104.1
- Laugh Attack
- Mix
- MLB Play-by-Play
- Nashville!
- Quoi de Neuf
- ReachMD
- Rock@Random
- Talk Radio
- The Pink Channel
- XM Deportivo
- XM Scoreboard

== Company history ==
=== 1988–2000 ===
The American Mobile Satellite Corporation was founded in 1988 where Bob Kerstein was the Chief Financial Officer. In 1991, Lon Levin joined the company. In 1992, the American Mobile Satellite Corporation created a new division known as American Mobile Radio Corp. Later that year, American Mobile brought in WorldSpace as an investor.

On May 16, 1997, American Mobile Satellite and WorldSpace officially changed the name of American Mobile Radio to XM Satellite Radio. Later that month, Lon Levin became president, a position he would hold until 1998. In October 1997, XM Satellite Radio obtained one of only two satellite digital audio radio service licenses offered by the Federal Communications Commission. In 1998, Hugh Panero President and CEO, joined XM Satellite Radio in the same role.

In June 1999, Clear Channel Communications, DirecTV, General Motors, and a private investment group invested US$250 million in XM Satellite Radio convertible debt. On June 7, with GM's investment in XM, they entered into a 12-year "Distribution Agreement" between XM and GM subsidiary, OnStar Corporation. The agreement called for exclusive installation of XM Satellite Radio into GM vehicles from November 12, 2001, until November 2013. OnStar had to meet specific escalating installation rates each year, while XM needed to make extensive payments to OnStar for the installation and sale of XM in their vehicles, while sharing revenue earned from these radios with OnStar, as well as payments on the exclusivity agreement.

At the same time as the investment, American Mobile Satellite, still XM's parent company, reacquired the stake WorldSpace held in the company. In October 1999, XM Satellite Radio issued 10,241,000 shares of Class A common stock at an IPO price of US$12.00 per share. American Mobile Satellite remained the majority holder of the public company.

In April 2000, American Mobile Satellite Corp. changed its name to Motient. In July, American Honda joined several private investors in a US$235 million preferred stock investment in the company.

=== 2001–2005 ===
On September 25, 2001, XM Satellite Radio launched in San Diego and Dallas–Fort Worth, with nationwide expansion plans set for November. The initial lineup included 100 channels consisting of sports, talk, children's programming, entertainment and news.

In October 2001, Motient was heading into bankruptcy and spun off their non-XM satellite division into a joint operation with TMI Communications and Company, L.P., a wholly owned subsidiary of BCE Inc. of Canada. The new venture was known as the Mobile Satellite Ventures. In November, Motient was in bankruptcy, and sold off their controlling interest in XM to Hughes Electronics, SingTel and Baron Capital Partners. Hughes Electronics would go on to combine this new interest in with the interest already held by their subsidiary, DirecTV. On November 12, 2001, XM Satellite Radio officially launched its nationwide service.

In January 2003, the company underwent a re-capitalization plan, involving XM exchanging US$300 million in old debt for new debt, while deferring interest for 3-years on the notes. They also restructured payment obligations on the General Motors installation agreement, issuing a convertible bond to GM, issuing a warrant for shares to GM, and establishing a revolving credit facility with GM. The plan also included new funding coming from a placement of over US$300 million in 10% convertible bonds to a group of private investors.

In 2004, General Motors sold Hughes Electronics to Rupert Murdoch's News Corp., and sold DirecTV's interest in XM Satellite Radio. On March 1, XM Radio launched Instant Traffic and Weather Channels for major metropolitan markets in the United States. Also in 2004, the company partnered with automakers General Motors, Honda, Isuzu, Nissan, Toyota, Volkswagen, and SAAB to offer in-dash XM receivers on an OEM basis. The Acura TL is the first luxury automobile to offer XM radio as "standard" in every vehicle.

On October 4, 2004, "shock jocks" Opie and Anthony begin broadcasting on a premium XM Satellite Radio station. Also, former National Public Radio host Bob Edwards broadcast the first Bob Edwards Show on XM Public Radio on channel 133. On October 20, XM announced an 11-year, US$650 million deal with Major League Baseball to broadcast games live nationwide and to become the Official Satellite Radio provider of Major League Baseball. The agreement granted XM the rights to use the MLB silhouetted batter logo and the collective marks of all major league clubs. As part of the deal, XM created a 24/7 MLB channel called "Home Plate". The deal started with the 2005 baseball season and ran through 2012, including a 3-year option that MLB could have picked up.

On May 28, 2005, The Wall Street Journal reported that XM had awarded the contract for the XM 5 spacecraft to Space Systems/Loral. On June 7, XM partnered with Audible.com to offer downloadable audio show archives of The Opie and Anthony Show, as well as The Bob Edwards Show. On August 1, XM announced a three-year partnership with the United States Tennis Association to broadcast the US Open tournament through 2007, as well as weekly reports from other US Open Series events. On September 12, XM announced a 10-year, US$100 million deal to carry National Hockey League broadcasts beginning with the 2005–06 season, initially sharing the coverage with SIRIUS but gaining satellite-radio exclusivity from 2007 onward. On November 29, XM launched service in Canada.

=== 2006–2010 ===
In January 2006, XM began broadcasting Fox News Talk. On January 9, XM won top honors at the 2006 Consumer Electronics Show. On February 9, XM announced a US$55 million, three-year deal with Oprah Winfrey's Harpo Productions.

In May 2006, the RIAA sued XM Satellite Radio over XM's new portable devices the Inno and Helix, claiming that the devices corresponded to a downloading service. XM contended the devices were protected because they recorded similarly to a videotape, allowing the consumer to record a portion of their broadcast similar to a VCR, DVR, or cassette player for later playback. On January 19, 2007, a district judge allowed the RIAA to proceed with the lawsuit, rejecting XM's defense that the conduct alleged in the complaint, if proved by the RIAA, would be immune under the Audio Home Recording Act of 1991.

On July 24, 2006, Nate Davis, formerly of XO Communications, was made the president and chief operating officer. In October, the XM-4 "Blues" satellite was launched atop a Zenit 3SL rocket.

On January 18, 2007, the Federal Communications Commission ruled that licensing regulations would prohibit a possible merger of XM and Sirius Satellite Radio. On February 19, XM Satellite Radio Holdings Inc. and Sirius Satellite Radio announced they would merge. On March 20, 2007, XM and Sirius filed a "Consolidated Application for Authority to Transfer Control" at the FCC. On July 24, XM announced that CEO Hugh Panero would leave the company in August, and that then-current President and COO Nate Davis would step in to serve as president and interim CEO.

On March 24, 2008, the United States Department of Justice approved the merger of XM and Sirius Satellite Radio. On July 26, the FCC approved the XM-Sirius merger and on July 29, Sirius and XM officially merged as SiriusXM Radio. XM Canada and Sirius Canada, subsidiaries of the parent companies, remained separate until April 2011.

In early 2009, SiriusXM prepared to file Chapter 11 bankruptcy. The company had a $1 billion debt obligation in 2009 and $175 million immediate obligation due February 17, 2009. On November 12, Gary Parsons resigned as chairman and was replaced by Eddy W. Hartenstein, as the new non-executive chairman.

On November 24, 2010, XM Canada and Sirius Canada announced plans to merge.

=== 2011–present ===
On April 11, 2011, the Canadian Radio-television and Telecommunications Commission approved the merger of the Canadian companies, Sirius and XM, into SiriusXM Canada.

== Technology ==
XM provided digital programming directly from two high-powered satellites in geostationary orbit above the equator: XM Rhythm at 85° west longitude and XM Blues at 115° west longitude in addition to a network of ground-based repeaters. The combination of two satellites and a ground-based repeater network was designed to provide gap-free coverage anywhere within the contiguous U.S., the southern tip of Alaska, and in the southern part of Canada. The signal could also be received in the Caribbean Islands and most of Mexico (reports have stated that areas north of Acapulco were able to receive a steady signal); however, XM is not yet licensed for reception by paid subscribers living in these areas.

The original satellites, XM-1 ("Rock") and XM-2 ("Roll") suffered from a generic design fault on the Boeing 702 series satellite (fogging of the solar panels), which meant that their lifetimes were shortened to approximately six years instead of the design goal of 15 years. To compensate for this flaw, XM-3 ("Rhythm") was launched ahead of its planned schedule on February 28, 2005, and moved into XM-1's previous location of 85° WL. XM-1 was then moved to be co-located with XM-2 at 115° WL, where each satellite operated only one transponder (thus broadcasting half the bandwidth each) to conserve energy and cut the power consumption in half while XM-4 ("Blues") was readied for launch. Subsequently, XM launched ground-spare XM-4 ("Blues") ahead of schedule on October 30, 2006, into the 115° WL location to complete the satellite replacement program. On December 15, 2006, XM-1 was finally powered down and then drifted back to its original location at 85° WL, where it remained as a backup to XM-3. XM-2 was similarly powered down and remained as a backup to XM-4. This makes the current active satellites as XM-3 "Rhythm" and XM-4 "Blues" with two in-orbit spares.

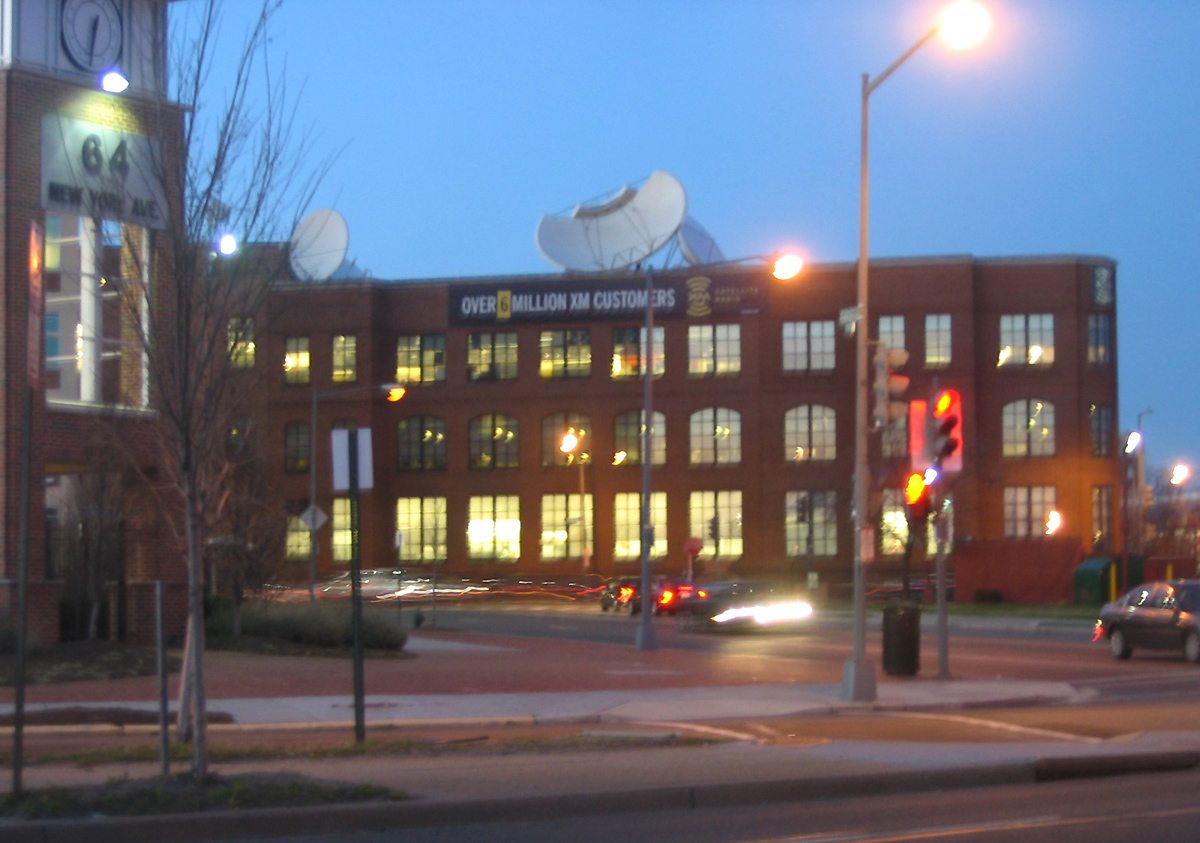
XM Satellite Radio headquarters in Washington, D.C., near the NoMa – Gallaudet University Metro station.

On June 7, 2005, Space Systems/Loral announced that it had been awarded a contract for XM-5. XM-5 was to feature two large, unfurlable antennas. Sirius' Radiosat 5, also to be built by Loral, was slated to have a similar single large antenna.

In American and Canadian metropolitan areas, XM and its Canadian licensee "Canadian Satellite Radio" (CSR) and operating as SiriusXM Canada, owned and operated a network of approximately 900 terrestrial repeater stations, meant to compensate for satellite signal blockage by buildings, tunnels, and bridges. In the United States, XM owned and operated approximately 800 repeater sites, covering 60 markets; in Canada, CSR was installing approximately 80 to 100 repeaters that were planned to be owned and operated by CSR in the 16 largest Canadian cities. The actual number of repeater sites varies as the signal is regularly tested and monitored for optimal performance. The actual number of sites in the United States has dropped from the original 1,000 installed when the service first launched in 2001. The repeaters transmit in the same frequency band as the satellites. A typical city contains 20 or more terrestrial stations. Typically, the receiver owner is unaware when a terrestrial station is being used, unless he or she checks antenna information from the receiver being used. Due to a FCC filing in October 2006, the latest list of XM's US terrestrial repeater network was made available to the public.

The XM signal used 12.5 MHz of the S band: 2332.5 to 2345.0 MHz. XM provided 128 kilobits per second of its bandwidth to OnStar Corporation for use with XM-enabled GM vehicles, regardless of whether their owners are XM subscribers. American Honda also retained the right to some of the company's bandwidth to transmit messages to Acura vehicles via a service known as AcuraLink.

XM NavTraffic, an optional service, transmitted coded traffic information directly to vehicle navigation systems using TMC technology.

Audio channels on XM were digitally compressed using the CT-aacPlus (HE-AAC) codec from Coding Technologies for most channels. That said, some channels rely on the AMBE codec from Digital Voice Systems (e.g., for voice channels), including all of the Traffic and Weather channels.

The XM radio signal was broadcast on 6 separate radio carriers within the 12.5 MHz allocation. The entire content of the radio service, including both data and audio content, was represented by only two carriers. The other 4 carriers carried duplicates of the same content to achieve redundancy through signal diversity. The data on each carrier is encoded using time-delayed and error-correction schemes to enhance availability. Effectively, the total radio spectrum used for content is a little over 4 MHz.

Each two-carrier group broadcast 100 8-kilobit-per-second streams in approximately 4 MHz of radio spectrum. These streams were combined using a patented process to form a variable number of channels using a variety of bitrates. Bandwidth is separated into segments of 4-kilobit-per-second virtual "streams" which are combined to form audio and data "channels" of varying bitrates from 4 to 64 kilobits-per-second.

XM preprocessed audio content using Neural Audio processors that are optimized for the aacPlus codec, including spectral band replication (SBR). Audio was stored digitally in Dalet audio library systems using an industry-standard MPEG-1 Layer II at 384 kbit/s, sometimes known as MUSICAM. The audio is further processed by the Neural Audio processors on the way to broadcast.

In the past, the SiriusXM Pops channel, which aired classical music, was broadcast in 5.1 surround sound. The technology, titled XM HD Surround, is the result of a partnership between XM and Neural Audio Corporation which provides content with six discrete channels of digital audio. The former XM Live channel also broadcast in this format for certain concerts and studio performances. XM manufacturing partners such as Denon, Onkyo, Pioneer Electronics (USA) Inc., and Yamaha introduced home audio systems capable of playing XM HD Surround. It is not known if the XM HD Surround technology is used on the service as of 2015.

== Satellites ==
- XM 1 (Roll). Launch occurred May 8, 2001.
- XM 2 (Rock). Launch occurred March 18, 2001.
- XM 3 (Rhythm). Launch occurred February 28, 2005.
- XM 4 (Blues). Launch occurred October 30, 2006.
- XM 5 Launch occurred October 14, 2010.

== Clear Channel programming agreement ==
In 1998, Clear Channel Communications invested in XM. The companies entered into agreements which provided for certain programming and director designation arrangements as long as Clear Channel retained the full amount of its original investment in XM. One positive consequence of this was that XM had (and still has) exclusive programming rights to all Clear Channel content, including popular national shows like Coast to Coast AM, but the shows could only be broadcast inside the bandwidth controlled by Clear Channel. In June 2003, Clear Channel entered into a forward sales agreement relating to its ownership of XM. During the third quarter of 2005, Clear Channel and XM arbitrated the impact of this agreement on the Operational Assistance Agreement and the Director Designation Agreement. The Arbitration Panel decided that the Operational Assistance Agreement would remain in effect, including Clear Channel's right to receive a revenue share of commercial advertising on programming it provides to XM, but declined to enforce the Director Designation Agreement, which forced the Mays family members off the board of directors. Per the original agreement, Clear Channel had the right to program 409.6 kbit/s (or 10%) of XM bandwidth, requiring XM to include commercial advertising on the existing Nashville!, KISS, Mix, and Sunny (now The Music Summit). The amount of advertising on the music channels amounts up to 4 minutes per hour, similar to the amount of advertising XM included before going commercial free. Exceptions include syndicated music shows which carry network spots. Clear Channel advertising on XM is handled by its subsidiary, Premiere Radio Networks. Clear Channel also provided existing talk channel programming (Fox Sports Radio, Extreme XM, Talk Radio). Clear Channel also controlled America Right (formerly Buzz XM), but through a series of show swaps, most non-Clear Channel content was removed and programming control returned to XM Radio. Plans to introduce new regional based talk channels, which would have featured a regional 5 minute newscast for each area of the country, were canceled. Instead, Clear Channel chose to introduce other music and talk channels. Newer channels including ReachMD, America's Talk remain on the air. The Pink Channel, National Lampoon Comedy Radio, WSIX-FM, WLW, and Rock@Random were launched and later removed, and replaced by channels like Bollywood & Beyond, The Music Summit, and Sixx Sense, all of which are on the air today.

Seen as a blow to XM's 100% commercial-free music channel status, XM Executive Vice President of Programming Eric Logan released a programming announcement to XM subscribers on the company's website that reiterated XM's commitment to commercial-free music while noting that XM still had the most commercial-free music and that more commercial-free music channels will be added in the near future to ensure that XM will still have more commercial-free music than competitor Sirius Satellite Radio. On April 17, 2006, XM launched US Country (XM17), Flight 26 (XM26), XM Hitlist (XM30) and Escape (XM78) to provide commercial free music in the formats of the Clear Channel programmed music channels which were going to begin airing commercials. In response, Sirius has advertised that they are the only satellite radio provider that has 100% commercial-free music channels. Both XM and Sirius air commercials on their news, talk, and sports channels.

The Clear Channel forward sales agreement with Bear, Stearns & Co. Inc was terminated on August 2, 2006. The termination resulted in Clear Channel Investments, Inc. paying Bear Stearns a total of $83.1 million, which was the value of Clear Channel's stake in XM. The accreted value of the debt was $92.9 million, and the fair value of the collar was an asset of $6.0 million, which resulted in a net gain of $3.8 million for Clear Channel.

== PCR and DirectPCR ==
At the heart of the TimeTrax controversy was the XM PCR: a computer-controlled XM Receiver. Unlike the other receivers, which could be used in the car or home stereo, the XM PCR required a computer to run. A software application on the computer acted as the radio's controls and display, which led to a flurry of third-party developers who wanted to make a PCR replacement. Many of them received Cease and Desist letters from the XM company. Once the PCR was discontinued, for the reasons listed above, people found that the XM Direct, a receiver intended to be used in satellite-ready car stereos, can be connected to a computer with a very simple adapter cable. Some people have dubbed the entire kit, with receiver, cable, and software, the Direct PCR. While the original PCR software does not control the XM Direct receiver, several community developers have continued to develop PCR replacement software.

== Merger with Sirius Satellite Radio and company restructuring ==
On February 19, 2007, XM announced a merger deal with competitor Sirius Satellite Radio. The merger combined the two radio services and created a single satellite radio network in the United States and Canada.

The United States Department of Justice announced on March 24, 2008, that it had closed its investigation of the merger because it "concluded that the evidence does not demonstrate that the proposed merger of XM and Sirius was likely to substantially lessen competition."

On June 16, 2008, FCC Chairman Kevin Martin told The Washington Post that he had decided to approve the XM-Sirius Merger after the companies agreed in the previous week to concessions intended to prevent the new company from raising prices or stifling competition. Martin issued an order to approve the merger, according to The Wall Street Journal – setting the stage for a final vote which could have occurred any time after his recommendation was circulated.

The XM–Sirius merger gained its final governmental approval from the Federal Communications Commission on July 25, 2008, with Martin and commissioners Robert M. McDowell and deciding vote Deborah Taylor Tate voting in the affirmative. As a term of the merger, the combined company will be fined almost $20 million for failing to create and market interchangeable radios capable of receiving signals from both companies prior to the merger.

== iPhone, iPod Touch, BlackBerry and Android applications ==
XM developed a software application for use on the Apple iPhone and Apple iPod Touch devices that allowed XM subscribers to listen to its programming over the Apple devices. The Sirius XM iPhone App became available in the Apple iTunes Store on June 17, 2009.

All SiriusXM Internet Radio subscribers are able to download the application from the Apple iTunes App-Store for free. Listening on an iPhone/iPad/iPod Touch is included with some subscription packages, a separate fee is required with other packages.

On February 4, 2010, SiriusXM released an app for the Research In Motion BlackBerry line of smartphones, including the Storm (Series 9500), Bold (Series 9000 and 9700), Tour (Series 9600) and Curve (Series 8500 and 8900). Like the Apple iPhone/iPod Touch application, the BlackBerry app is free but requires a SiriusXM subscription.

SiriusXM is also available for download on Android devices through Google Play.

The applications carry most of the XM music, talk, sports and entertainment programming, as well as some exclusive Internet-only content. The mobile applications also carry a select number of channels from the "Best of SIRIUS/XM" packages, dependent on the subscriber's subscription level.

== Canada ==
In November 2004, Canadian Satellite Radio filed an application with the Canadian Radio-television and Telecommunications Commission to bring the XM service to Canada. Along with Sirius Canada and the consortium of CHUM Limited and Astral Media, CSR was one of three applications for national subscription radio services submitted to the CRTC.

On June 16, 2005, the CRTC approved all three applications. The decisions were appealed to the Canadian federal cabinet by a number of broadcasting, labor, and arts and culture organizations, including the Friends of Canadian Broadcasting, CHUM Limited, and the National Campus and Community Radio Association. The groups objected to the satellite radio applicants' approach to and reduced levels of Canadian content and French-language programming, along with the exclusion of Canadian non-commercial broadcasting. After a lengthy debate, Cabinet rejected the appeals on September 9, 2005.

XM's Canadian channels appeared on US receivers on November 17, 2005. On November 29, 2005, XM Canada officially launched.

== See also ==
- Boeing Satellite Systems
- Sirius Satellite Radio, a satellite radio company
- 1worldspace, a satellite radio company
- SiriusXM, a satellite radio company
- List of SiriusXM channels
- XM Radio Canada
- XM Satellite Radio channel history
