= Costas on the Radio =

American radio show

- Genre: Talk radio
- Running time: 2 hours
- Country of origin: (United States) USA
- Home station: Premiere Radio Networks
- Starring: Bob Costas
- Original release: September 16, 2006 – May 31, 2009

Costas on the Radio was an American radio show hosted by Bob Costas. It aired weekly on Premiere Radio Networks (affiliates could choose to air the show on Saturdays or Sundays). Although a longtime sportscaster who is best known for his work on NBC Sports, Costas discussed many issues besides sports, interviewing celebrities and newsmakers in a format similar to that of fellow broadcaster Larry King's radio days.

The show began its run on September 16, 2006. Costas on the Radio succeeds Costas Coast to Coast, a syndicated call-in radio show hosted by Costas from 1986 to 1996.

The show ended its run on May 31, 2009.

The show was created by Sean Compton and Costas.

== Format ==
Each two-hour show featured Costas administering one or two longform interviews (usually lasting for an entire hour) of various athletes, sports book authors, journalists, and other entertainers and newsmakers not necessarily involved in the sports industry. Guests usually appeared in studio, but interviews were occasionally conducted over the telephone. Costas described the show in a promo as having "something for everyone."

== Special features ==
Packaged with the show were the daily minute-long Costas Cut and Costas Minute features, for sports and news/talk stations respectively. The features included bits from prior interviews on the main show.

== Syndication ==
Each show was recorded on Thursday afternoon, and Premiere Radio fed the program to its affiliates via satellite four times each weekend.

The show originated from New York City or St. Louis and was syndicated across the United States and Canada, on over 220 AM and FM stations, by Premiere Radio Networks. It also aired three times each weekend on XM Talk Radio 165.

== Guests ==
Guests of Costas on the Radio included (but are not limited to) the following:

- Kareem Abdul-Jabbar, former National Basketball Association player
- Ben Affleck, actor
- Lance Armstrong, 7-time Tour de France-winning cyclist
- Tiki Barber, former New York Giants running back
- Chuck Berry, musician
- Gary Bettman, National Hockey League commissioner
- Brian Billick, former Baltimore Ravens Head Coach
- Larry Bird, former National Basketball Association player
- Bill Bradley, former U.S. Senator and New York Knicks forward
- Mark Brunell, New York Jets quarterback.
- Joe Buck, Fox MLB/NFL announcer
- Frank Caliendo, comedian/impressionist, best known for his impersonation of John Madden
- Linda Cohn, anchor on ESPN's SportsCenter
- Dabney Coleman, actor
- Cris Collinsworth, NBC Sports and NFL Network
- Kevin Costner, actor
- Chili Davis, former Major League Baseball designated hitter
- Frank Deford, sportswriter
- Dan Dierdorf, former St. Louis Cardinals lineman and current NFL on CBS commentator
- Héctor Elizondo, actor
- Roger Goodell, National Football League Commissioner
- Rutger Hauer, actor
- Ice Cube, rapper/actor/director
- Jerry Jones, Dallas Cowboys principal owner
- Richard Karn, actor
- John La Puma, physician and host of Lifetime TV's "Health Corner"
- Matt Lauer, The Today Show anchor
- Mark Linn-Baker, actor
- Bernie Mac, actor/comedian
- Bill Maher, comedian and host of HBO's Real Time with Bill Maher
- Howie Mandel, comedian and host of Deal or No Deal
- Matthew McConaughey, actor
- Norm Macdonald, comedian and star of Dirty Work.
- Seth MacFarlane, creator of Family Guy
- John Mellencamp, musician
- Al Michaels, NBC Sunday Night Football play-by-play announcer
- Jerry O'Connell, actor and star of Sliders
- Conan O'Brien, Host of NBC's The Tonight Show
- Bill O'Reilly, Fox News Channel commentator
- Buster Olney, ESPN.com baseball writer
- Mehmet Oz, cardiothoracic surgeon, author and host of The Dr. Oz Show.
- Dan Rather, former CBS Evening News anchor
- Robin Roberts, Good Morning America anchor
- Rachel Robinson, widow of Jackie Robinson
- Alex Rodriguez, New York Yankees shortstop
- Pete Rose, former Cincinnati Reds manager and first baseman
- Chris Sabo, former Cincinnati Reds third baseman
- Jeremy Schaap, author and ESPN reporter
- Bill Scheft, senior writer for Late Show with David Letterman
- Jason Sehorn, former New York Giants cornerback
- Bud Selig, Major League Baseball Commissioner
- David Stern, National Basketball Association Commissioner
- Darryl Strawberry, former baseball player
- Bob Uecker, announcer for the Milwaukee Brewers
- Fay Vincent, former Major League Baseball Commissioner
- Max Weinberg, drummer for The E Street Band and The Max Weinberg 7 of The Tonight Show
- Brian Williams, NBC Nightly News anchor
