= KJAA =

- Globe, Arizona; United States
- Frequency: 1240 kHz
- Branding: Juke Box 1240

Programming
- Format: Oldies

Ownership
- Owner: Rollye Cornell and Jon Cornell; (Globecasting, Inc.)

History
- First air date: 1980
- Former call signs: KGJM (1980–82); KSML (1982–85); KYOR (1985–89)

Technical information
- Licensing authority: FCC
- Facility ID: 24161
- Class: C
- Power: 1,000 watts
- Transmitter coordinates: 33°22′51″N 110°45′25″W
- Translator: 106.1 K291CU (Globe)

Links
- Public license information: Public file; LMS
- Webcast: Listen Live
- Website: kjaa.us

KJAA (1240 kHz) is a commercial AM radio station in Globe, Arizona, airing an oldies format. It is owned by veteran radio personality and talk show host Rollye James and her husband Jon Cornell, through licensee Globecasting, Inc.

KJAA is powered at 1,000 watts, using a non-directional antenna. Programming is also heard on FM translator K291CU at 106.1 MHz in Globe.

== History ==
1240 kHz in Globe was home to two previous licenses. The first, KWJB/KZOW, operated from 1938 to 1960, when the impending revocation of the licenses of all stations owned by Gila Broadcasting forced the chain to shut down. The second, KWJB/KPPR, operated between 1969 and approximately 1978.

In 1978, James Mace, who had owned the second KWJB before selling it in 1975, made an application to rebuild 1240 on a new license after KPPR's demise. The application was granted in 1980, and Mace selected the KGJM call sign.

The station later had the call letters KSML and KYOR. In 1989, Rollye James and Jon Cornell acquired the station, switching the call sign to KJAA. It changed to an oldies format and later began simulcasting on FM translator K291CU at 106.1 MHz.
