= Quoi de Neuf =

- Canada
- Broadcast area: Canada; United States
- Frequency: XM125
- Branding: Quoi de Neuf fr

Programming
- Format: (in French) Art and Entertainment news & information 2007-04-09 as (in French) News Radio
- Affiliations: La Presse Canadienne

Ownership
- Owner: XM Radio Canada

History
- First air date: 2005-11-17

Technical information
- Class: Satellite Radio Station

Links
- Website: Quoi de Neuf

Quoi de Neuf ("What's New") in French, is a Canadian 24-hour news and information radio station, which airs on XM Satellite Radio channel 125. The station is primarily a loop of news programming, much of which was originally sourced from Corus Quebec's terrestrial news stations. Quoi de Neuf focused much more on entertainment and lifestyle news than its English counterpart, Canada 360.

However, due to budget issues, XM Radio Canada decided to release the staff at Quoi de Neuf. In addition, the format was changed to news radio and is outsourced to the French-language broadcast arm of The Canadian Press, with a culture segment done in-house.

On November 12, 2008, Quoi de Neuf was moved from channel 245 to channel 125.
