= Sixx Sense =

- Broadcast area: United States; Canada; iHeartRadio

Programming
- Format: Active rock; Alternative rock; Mainstream rock; Classic rock

Ownership
- Owner: Clear Channel Communications

History
- First air date: August 18, 2008
- Last air date: December 31, 2017
- Former frequencies: XM channel 161 (2008–2013)

Links
- Website: sixxsense.com

Sixx Sense was a nationally syndicated rock radio show broadcast from Sherman Oaks, Los Angeles and heard on over 115 radio stations. It was also available on iHeartRadio in the United States and Canada. The iHeartRadio channel intersperses active rock and alternative rock with talk from hosts Nikki Sixx and Jenn Marino. Sixx Sense was one of eleven channels produced by Clear Channel for broadcast on XM Satellite Radio. Other Clear Channel XM stations include: America's Talk, Extreme Talk, ReachMD, and Talk Radio; as well as simulcasts of Fox Sports Radio, KIIS-FM, WGCI-FM, WHTZ, WLTW, and WSIX-FM. Advertising sales are handled by Premiere Networks.

Clear Channel sold off its ownership stake in Sirius XM Radio during the second quarter of fiscal year 2013. As a result of the sale, nine of Clear Channel's eleven XM stations, including Sixx Sense, will cease broadcast over XM Satellite Radio on October 18, 2013.

== History ==
XM channel 161 originally launched as Discovery Channel Radio, and was heard on both XM and Sirius. On September 1, 2005, Discovery Channel Radio was removed from the XM lineup, and months later from Sirius. Eight months later, the channel was brought back to the lineup as a full-time simulcast of WSIX-FM in Nashville. This brought XM 161 under Clear Channel control, as they were able to select any vacant channel of their choosing. This was also the second time WSIX-FM was simulcast on XM, as it was also from 2001-2003 on channel 11, which was known as Nashville! until June 2011 and is now WSIX-FM yet again.

On Friday, August 8, 2008, WSIX left XM Radio for the second time, and the channel began stunting with a commercial free country format. The following Monday, XM 161 played Beatles music nonstop for twelve hours, afterwards reverting to the country format.

Rock@Random launched on XM on Monday, August 18, 2008, with the song Hush by Deep Purple. There is currently no information on whether or not the station will carry a personality-driven lineup.

In December 2008, Rock@Random adjusted their playlist to include newer rock music into the 80s and early 90s.

On June 10, 2009: Rock@Random again adjusted their playlist to include many 80's pop/rock songs with some 70's added-in, however, the playlist provided a rotation of 16 hours of music then playing the same order of songs.

Since then, Rock@Random does not repeat songs too frequently, and does not play the same songs in the same order. It provides a great variety of rock music that is safe for public places because to the editing of profanity. The range of music is from Iron Maiden to Bob Seger, Judas Priest to Pink Floyd, Nirvana to Fleetwood Mac. The station is listed with a "CM" logo, which means the station includes commercials.

On February 22, 2011: Rock@Random was replaced on XM channel 161 by Sixx Sense.

On October 12, 2017, Nikki Sixx announced that he will end his nationally syndicated shows at the end of the year to focus on other projects, including adapting The Heroin Diaries: A Year In The Life of a Shattered Rockstar into a Broadway musical. The final broadcast of Sixx Sense aired on December 31, 2017.

== Hosts ==
- Nikki Sixx (2008–2017)
- Jenn Marino (2014–2017)
- Kerri Kasem (2008-2014)

== Shows ==
- Side Show - Top 20 active rock song countdown hosted by Nikki Sixx and Jenn Marino. Saturdays at 8 PM Eastern, repeated Sundays at 10 AM Eastern.
