= Hollywood Hamilton's Weekend Top 30 =

- Other names: Hollywood Hamilton's Rhythm Countdown (1998-2000); DJ Pup Dawg's Top 30 Countdown (rhythmic version; 2021-present)
- Genre: Music chart show
- Running time: Approx. 3 hrs. (including commercials); 2 hrs. and 21 mins. (without commercials)
- Country of origin: United States
- Language: English
- Home station: WKTU (New York City); WJMN (Boston; rhythmic version, 2009-present)
- Syndicates: AMFM Radio Networks (1998-2000); NBG Radio Network (2000-2002); Crystal Media Networks (2002-2005); United Stations Radio Networks (2005-2013); Premiere Networks (2013-2021)
- Hosted by: Sean Hamilton (CHR version; rhythmic version from 1998-2009); Ramiro Torres (rhythmic version; 2009-2015); DJ Pup Dawg (rhythmic version; 2015-present); Various guest hosts
- Produced by: Michelle Parisi
- Executive producer: Sean Hamilton
- Original release: November 1998 – June 27, 2021 (Note: Pop version; the rhythmic version continues spun-off from WT30)
- Audio format: Stereophonic sound

Hollywood Hamilton's Weekend Top 30 (also known as The Weekend Top 30 and abbreviated as WT30) was a nationally syndicated radio program created and hosted by American radio personality Sean "Hollywood" Hamilton. It debuted in November 1998 and ended in June 2021.

== Format ==
From 2000 onwards, the countdown was available in two versions: Pop (for CHR stations) and Rhythm (later renamed Urban; for rhythmic and urban contemporary stations). From its debut in 1998 until the addition of the Pop version in 2000, the countdown was solely available for rhythmic stations and was branded under the name Hollywood Hamilton's Rhythm Countdown (also known as the Rhythm Top 30). Since then, it has been rebranded to the Weekend Top 30 to reflect the two versions.

Charted songs were initially determined by a mix of radio airplay data by affiliates and listener votes via the show’s website, text messaging (where listeners text a charted song to a short code) and on the show’s social media accounts. Starting in 2013, the listener voting was discontinued and songs were charted solely based on airplay data. Similar to most countdowns such as American Top 40 and Rick Dees Weekly Top 40, WT30 also featured a year-end chart as the final chart of a year.

Until 2009, Hamilton hosted both the pop and rhythmic versions simultaneously. WJMN personality Ramiro Torres took over hosting duties of the rhythmic version (who would later be succeeded by DJ Pup Dawg, also from that same station). Consequently, the rhythmic version moved base to Boston from the show's New York City base studios.

=== Segments ===
- Last Week's Top Five: A recap of the last five songs from the preceding week
- Guest DJ: Listeners call in to introduce a charted song as well as to give shoutouts to friends and family
- Backstage with…: Correspondents interview charting artists on-site from concerts
- Mashup of the Week: Listener-submitted mashups heard during the chart
- CD Ten Pack Giveaway: Listeners participate in various contests to win a ten-pack of albums from charting artists (e.g. correctly match that week's top ten chart, identifying charting artists' holiday greetings, etc.)
- Timeline: Clips of past number-one songs from various years

== History ==
On January 28, 2013, Hamilton signed a new deal with Premiere Networks that brings his syndicated countdown shows into the Premiere syndication stable beginning February 1, 2013. In addition, his shows will also be featured on the iHeartRadio platform, which is owned by Premiere's parent company (and Hamilton's employer) iHeartMedia

The weekend of June 26–27, 2021 was the last airing for all of Hamilton's syndicated shows. Despite this, the Urban version continues to be broadcast both on radio and on streaming apps such as iHeartRadio, Dash Radio and Mixcloud under the name DJ Pup Dawg’s Top 30 Countdown, while also adding KPWR personality Kalisha Pereira as contributor.

== Related programs and spin-offs ==
=== Remix Top 30 ===
Hamilton also hosted a spin-off of the Weekend Top 30, the Remix Top 30, which consisted of remixed versions of top songs weekly by rotating DJs and producers.

On July 31, 2017, the Remix Top 30 won Best Syndicated Show of the year at the 2017 Promo Awards in Atlantic City, New Jersey.

On August 6, 2019, the Remix Top 30 won Best Syndicated Show of the year at the 1 Music Ave Awards in Ft Lauderdale, FL.

=== Rhythm Countdown with Ellen K ===
On December 2000, following the rebranding and split of the Weekend Top 30 programs, Premiere Networks launched a new version of the preceding Rhythm Countdown, hosted by at the time KIIS-FM radio personality Ellen K instead of Hamilton. Unlike Hamilton's version, Ellen K’s version featured a “studio audience” (consisting of the show's staff). It ran until December 2002.
