= Neural Audio Corporation =

Audio research company in Kirkland, Washington

Neural Audio Corporation was an audio research company based in Kirkland, Washington.

The company specialized in high-end audio research. It helped XM Satellite Radio launch their service using the Neural Codec Pre-Conditioner, which was designed to provide higher quality audio at lower bitrates.

== History ==
The company was co-founded by two audio engineers, Paul Hubert and Robert Reams in 2000.

In 2009 the company was acquired by DTS Inc. for $15 million in cash.

== Products ==
Neural was mostly known for its work in the field of audio processing and its "Neural Surround" sound format. ESPN, FOX, NBC, CBS, Sony, Universal, Warner Bros, THX, Yamaha, Pioneer Electronics, Ford, Honda, Nissan, Vivendi and SiriusXM were partners and customers in connection with sound for movies, broadcasting applications, music reproduction and video games.

"Neural Surround" is a technology similar to MPEG Surround, where a 5.1 stream is downmixed into stereo than recovered using cues – encoded into the downmixed stereo. NPR participated in a trial of the "Neural Surround" technology in 2004, using the Harris NeuStar 5225. XM HD Surround was based on the same technology.

Neural provides its "Codec Pre-Conditioner" in at least two types of devices, a "NeuStar UltraLink digital radio audio conditioner" built as a physical device and a "Neustar SW4.0" built as a piece of software on Windows XP. Manual of the software indicates that the pre-conditioner works by analyzing noise in each frequency bin and masking them to not exceed predefined limits, so that they would not overwhelm a codec.

Harris Broadcast acted as a redistributor of Neural technology.
