= Sirius Canada =

- Type: Private
- Industry: Broadcasting
- Founded: June 16, 2005
- Defunct: June 21, 2011
- Fate: Merged with XM Radio Canada
- Successor: SiriusXM Canada
- Headquarters: Toronto, Ontario, Canada
- Key people: Mark Redmond, president and CEO
- Products: Satellite radio
- Website: Sirius Canada

Sirius Canada was a Canadian company, a partnership between Slaight Communications, the Canadian Broadcasting Corporation and Sirius Satellite Radio, which was one of three services licensed by the CRTC on June 16, 2005, to introduce satellite radio service to Canada.

On November 24, 2010, following the merger of Sirius Satellite Radio and XM Satellite Radio in the United States, Sirius Canada and XM Radio Canada announced their own merger deal, subject to approval by shareholders and the CRTC. The CRTC approved the merger in April 2011, and thus paved the way for both services to take the name SiriusXM Canada. The merger was subsequently completed on June 21, 2011.

Canadian Satellite Radio, the former licensee of XM, would hold 30 percent of the merged company, while Slaight Communications and the Canadian Broadcasting Corporation, the owners of Sirius Canada, would each hold 20 percent and the American Sirius XM Radio would hold 25 percent. Mark Redmond, the president and CEO of Sirius Canada, would retain an executive role in the new merged company.

Unlike XM Radio Canada, Sirius Canada was a private company, and was therefore not required to release quarterly financial result data.

== Subscription package ==
The initial lineup was announced on November 2, 2005, and included 100 channels, including 10 Canadian services. Ten more services, nine American and one Canadian, were added to the package in 2006.

The service's conditions of licence provide for a minimum of eight Canadian-produced channels, and a maximum distribution of nine American services per Canadian channel. Although Astral Media produced two French-language music channels for the service, Slaight's share in Sirius Canada was not part of Astral's 2007 takeover of Slaight's terrestrial radio assets.

=== CBC programming ===
- CBC Radio One, news/information (Channel 159)
- CBC Radio 3, independent music (Channel 152)
- Première Plus, French language news/information (Channel 160)
- Bande à part, French language independent music (Channel 161)
- Sports extra, French language sports news/information (Channel 156)
- Espace Musique, French language music radio (Channel 153)

=== Slaight Communications programming ===
- Iceberg Radio, adult album alternative music (Channel 85)
- L'Oasis Francophone (formerly Rock Velours), French language adult contemporary pop (Channel 88)
- Latitude Franco (formerly Énergie^{2}), French language pop/rock (Channel 89)

=== Third party programming ===
- The Score Satellite Radio, sports talk (Channel 98)

In June 2006, Sirius also added an audio simulcast of The Weather Network, now found on Channel 138.

Initially, only five of these channels (Radio One, Radio 3, Première Plus, Bande à part and Iceberg) were also offered on the US Sirius network, although as of late 2006 all of the Canadian channels are now available in the United States (although not on all Sirius receivers).

Contrary to some initial expectations, CBC Radio 2 and Espace musique were not included, at least in part because, as their terrestrial CRTC licences allow nearly 80% of "special interest" (i.e. classical, jazz) music to be foreign, they would not be in compliance with the CRTC's mandate that Canadian-produced satellite radio channels carry 85 per cent Canadian content.

Sirius Canada's licence prohibits them from broadcasting "localized" content such as local or regional newscasts, weather forecasts or traffic reports. As a result, the Radio One feed does not include local programs or weather forecasts. Instead, the network's local programming blocks are filled with repeat airings of other CBC programming.

The Canadian subscription package of 110 channels includes the 11 Canadian channels listed above and most, but not all of the US channels. List of Sirius Satellite Radio stations includes a graphic notation of which services are and are not available in Canada.

On April 24, 2006, it was announced that Sirius would become the exclusive satellite radio broadcaster for Canadian Football League games, beginning with the launch of the 2006 CFL season on June 16.

== Other differences ==
In addition to the differences in programming there are some other minor differences between Sirius Canada and the US.

When Sirius Canada launched, it did not offer signup over the internet; instead, new customers had to activate over the phone. Currently Sirius Canada offers activation over the phone, and internet activation with a reduced activation fee. As of October 2006, Sirius Canada allows internet streaming of material to subscribers.

The selection of Sirius-compatible radios sold in Canadian retail channels is limited to only the Sirius One, the Sirius Starmate, the Sirius Starmate Replay, the Sirius XACT XTR3CK, the Stiletto and the Sirius Sportster Replay. However, people report that Sirius Canada will allow receivers purchased in the US to be activated on the Sirius Canada system.

Recently on Sirius Canada's homepage, it started to offer the Stiletto 100 SL100 to its Canadian subscribers.

Also, it has been reported that receivers purchased in Canada can be activated on the US network. However, due to firmware differences, some Canadian channels may be missing from the line-up.

== Howard Stern ==
On September 2, 1997, Canadian radio stations Q107 (Toronto) and CHOM (Montreal) began airing the Howard Stern Show. That day, Stern called the French "peckerheads" and said that "the French should bend over for me the way they did for Hitler". That broadcast, and others, led to thousands of complaints to the Canadian Broadcast Standards Council. As a result of the complaints Q107 continued to air the Stern show but with an eight-minute tape delay and some bleeping. CHOM stopped airing Stern in August 1998, and Q107 did the same in November 2001. Corus Entertainment's newly appointed program director John Hayes dropped Stern because he wanted to return Q107 to an all music, classic rock format. It was also problematic that Stern had been available since early 2001 on WBUF, Buffalo without the twenty-minute delay or onerous editing that was taking place on Q107. Stern later announced his move to Sirius, effective January 2006, as the U. S. Federal Communications Commission has no jurisdiction over content on subscription-based services such as cable television or satellite radio. However, the CRTC has always held content jurisdiction over content on cable services and is apparently able to regulate satellite radio content as well.

Sirius Canada's licence decision made no explicit reference to Stern but does obligate the company to maintain the same standards (i.e. the CAB's Sex-role Portrayal Code) as for conventional stations. The decision also recognizes Sirius's ability to air "adult" programming in separate packages, but even these must comply with the Code. (By way of comparison, even adult content from Canadian pay-per-view providers is subject to review prior to broadcast, to ensure compliance with the Code.)

Sirius Canada later announced that Howard Stern's two channels, Howard 100 and Howard 101, would not be available to its Canadian customers. Naturally this has generated negative response from Canadian fans of Stern, some of whom have claimed that they would not subscribe to any service absent the two Stern channels. According to Gary Slaight, CEO of Standard Broadcasting:

The CRTC, who we are licensed to, would eventually force us to take Stern down, because we have standards we have to abide by in this country when you own a broadcasting licence.

Nonetheless, pressure from fans, many of whom were reportedly continuing to purchase grey-market American Sirius receivers, continued to build. For instance, Josef Radomski, a Canadian writer, announced on the January 11, 2006 Howard Stern Show that he had started an online petition to bring Stern to Sirius Canada.

However, the CRTC had not in fact banned Stern's broadcast in Canada — Sirius Canada instead chose not to risk provoking an issue with the broadcast regulator. Nonetheless, there is some ambiguity in the licence conditions. Some media commentators suggested that Sirius Canada's reluctance to carry Stern had less to do with regulatory concerns and more to do with unwillingness to pay the American company's syndication fees for the program. Others might argue that Sirius Canada was simply trying to avoid the public relations and regulatory battle that would likely follow if it decided to carry Stern.

When Sirius Canada finally announced on February 1, 2006 — three months after the Canadian service's launch — that the Howard 100 channel would be made available to all subscribers effective February 6, the announcement was covered by most media outlets but did not generate any significant backlash.

In May 2006, Sirius Canada announced that it would add Howard 101 to its lineup. The channel was made available to listeners on June 19, 2006, as part of a 10-channel addition to Sirius Canada's channel lineup.

== Sirius Canada and Apple ==
On November 17, 2009, Sirius Canada announced that the company launched the first official satellite radio application for the iPhone and iPod touch users in the country. The application is free from Apple's App store. Subscribers can now have access to SIRUS Canada's programming content, and commercial-free music channels.
