= XM HD Surround =

On December 28, 2005, XM Satellite Radio announced that it had teamed up with Neural Audio Corporation to introduce XM HD Surround. XM HD Surround broadcasts XM channels in 5.1 digital surround sound. For a time XM broadcast a variety of special shows and live music performances in this format. According to the press release, Denon, Onkyo, Pioneer Electronics (USA) Inc., and Yamaha planned to introduce home audio systems capable of playing XM HD Surround in 2006.

The 5.1 surround sound is encoded in the stereo wave for transmission and is thus compatible with any mono/stereo/matrix-style receiver. If played on a 5.1 audio set equipped with a Neural Surround decoder, the watermarks (i.e. spatial cues) in the waveforms are detected and the signal is recovered to its original 5.1 form. The technology is similar to parametric stereo, in which a mono signal is recovered to stereo. The bitrate for XMHD surround broadcasts is ~70 kbit/s using a proprietary form of aacPlus from Coding Technologies.

== XM HD Surround Channels (as of 12/11/08) ==
- XM77 Sirius XM Pops - Classical Popular Music
