= WSIX =

WSIX can refer to:

- WSIX-FM, a radio station (97.9 FM) licensed to serve Nashville, Tennessee.
- WKRN-TV, an ABC-affiliated television station licensed to serve Nashville, Tennessee, which used the WSIX-TV callsign until 1973.
