= XM Radio Canada =

Former Communications Company

Canadian Satellite Radio Holdings Inc.
- Type: Public
- Traded as: TSX: XSR
- Industry: Broadcasting
- Founded: 2002
- Defunct: June 21, 2011
- Fate: Merged with Sirius Canada
- Successor: SiriusXM Canada
- Headquarters: Toronto, Ontario, Canada
- Products: Satellite radio
- Revenue: ▲$53,000,000 estimated
- Net income: ▼$10,000,000 estimated
- Number of employees: 75
- Website: www.xmradio.ca www.cdnsatrad.com

XM Radio Canada was the operating name of Canadian Satellite Radio Holdings Inc. (or CSR), a Canadian communications and media company, which was incorporated in 2002 to broadcast satellite radio in Canada. Following the merger of SiriusXM in the United States, XM Canada and its competitor Sirius Canada reached a deal in late 2010 to merge into SiriusXM Canada, which was approved by the Canadian Radio-television and Telecommunications Commission on April 11, 2011 and completed on June 21, 2011.

== History ==
On August 19, 2003, Canadian Satellite Radio Holdings Inc., the parent company of CSR, filed its initial application to the Canadian Radio-television and Telecommunications Commission (CRTC) for a broadcast licence to provide subscription based digital radio service in Canada. In June 2005, the CRTC awarded the company a six-year licence to commence broadcasting in Canada. XM Radio Canada started transmissions across Canada on November 22, 2005, and launched officially on December 1, 2005. Clear Channel's channels were eliminated from XM Radio Canada on April 17, 2006. On April 1, 2007, XM Radio Canada began simulcasting the U.S. service, with the exception of Clear Channel's channels. On November 30, 2007, XM Radio Canada announced that they have over 350,000 subscribers. The Best Of Sirius package (NFL, NASCAR, Howard 100, Howard 101) was not included on XM Radio Canada's offerings in September 2008, even though the Sirius channels were poured to XM Radio Canada during the merger of XM and Sirius channels on November 12, 2008.

On November 24, 2010, CSR announced that it has proposed an all-stock merger with its competitor, Sirius Canada, subject to approval by shareholders and the CRTC. The CRTC approved the merger on April 11, 2011.

== Corporate Structure ==
XM Radio Canada is a wholly owned subsidiary of Canadian Satellite Radio Holdings Inc. (CSR Holdings). CSR Holdings is a publicly traded company on the TSX Exchange. The executive chairman and founder is John Bitove, a Canadian businessman, who owns 58% of CSR Holdings, while the American company SiriusXM owns 23% of CSR Holdings. The remaining 19% forms the publicly traded float on the TSX stock exchange. XMSR granted an exclusive 15 year licence (including a 5-year renewal) to XM Radio Canada to broadcast and distribute its content and to use its XM brand name.

XM Radio Canada has strategic alliances with Corus Entertainment, Telesat Canada, General Motors, Honda, Toyota, Nissan, Telus, Rogers Communications and Air Canada.

== XM Radio Canada Content ==
XM Radio Canada offers listeners 130 channels, including 100% commercial-free music as well as news, talk, sports and children's programming across Canada via satellite. XM Radio Canada also offers every NHL hockey game, as it is the exclusive broadcaster of the NHL games starting in the 2007-2008 season. As of September 2007, XM Radio Canada now offers every Major League Baseball game, the IRL, select college sports, and the PGA Tour Network along with the NHL. The company programs, produces, and distributes thirteen new Canadian channels (eight in English and five in French) with formats such as music, sports, comedy, and news, in addition to the existing XM service. XM Radio Canada uses the existing 2 XM satellites: Rhythm and Blues, as well as a system of ground repeaters across Canada to broadcast a subscription radio service to Canadians. For a complete list of channels, please visit List of XM Satellite Radio channels.

XM Radio Canada currently programs the following on-air channels for XM Satellite Radio.

- The Verge (XM87) - New and emerging Canadian rock music. This channel sticks to the up-and-coming talent and does not play the more established Canadian rock artists. Broadcast in (in English).
- Air Musique (XM88) - New and emerging music. Broadcast in (in French).
- Sur La Route (XM89) - Pop hits. Broadcast in (in French).
- XM Scoreboard (XM95) - Channel for sports news, scores and schedules on a tightly structured 10-minute newswheel. Broadcast in (in English).
- Canada 360 (XM96) - Looping news and information reel that covers news, business, and other forms of information for Canada. Broadcast in (in English).
- Calendrier Sportif (XM97) - Sports information channel. Broadcast in (in French).
- Quoi de Neuf (XM125) - Looping reel that covers art and entertainment news and information as well as news, business, and other forms of information for Canada. Broadcast in (in French).
- Laugh Attack (XM153) - Canadian stand-up and comedy routines. Like XM's now-defunct XM Comedy and the succeeding Raw Dog Comedy, this channel is completely uncensored. Broadcast in (in English).
- ATN-Asian Radio (XM159) - South Asian Programming produced by ATN. Broadcast majority in (in English).
- Radio Parallèle (XM172) - News, talk, information and entertainment channel that features Jeff Fillion's show. Broadcast in (in French).
- MLB Home Plate Info (XM179) - Major League Baseball information, scores, updates and short specials are produced for this channel, and loop on the other MLB play-by-play channels occasionally when out of service. Broadcast in (in English).
- NHL Home Ice (XM204) - National Hockey League talk and play by play. Features hockey talk and programming in the daytime hours and games in the nighttime hours. XM Radio is the exclusive broadcaster of the NHL. Broadcast in (in English).
- NHL Play-by-Play (XM205-209) - National Hockey League play by play. These channels are programmed and scheduled by XM Radio Canada. XM Radio Canada also produces special content for the channels during their downtime, as well as sports updates, known as NHL Home Ice Info. All broadcast in (in English).

== XM NavTraffic ==
XM Radio announced on 2007-07-30 that their XM NavTraffic added Montreal and Toronto to their list of cities that now have traffic data. Unfortunately, as of September 29, 2007, no data seems to appear for those users who have subscribed to this added feature. By calling XM Radio, you can leave a contact phone number to be notified when service is available.
