= Gary Sullivan (radio host) =

American radio host

- Presenting career
- Show: At Home with Gary Sullivan
- Network: Premiere Networks
- Time slot: 9a–12n Saturday & Sunday (9a–1p Saturday on WKRC)
- Website: Gary Sullivan Online

Gary Sullivan is the host of the American nationally syndicated radio program At Home with Gary Sullivan. The show is syndicated by Premiere Networks, a subsidiary of iHeartMedia, Inc. and is heard on many iHeart radio stations. It airs on Saturdays and Sundays.

Gary Sullivan is a Cincinnati native and hosts the show from the studios of 550 WKRC (AM), the flagship station. Sullivan first started working in a hardware store at age 16. He attended the University of Cincinnati and eventually rose to the president and majority owner of a 16-unit hardware store chain. Before beginning his nationally syndicated radio show in 2001, Sullivan hosted a TV show called "The Hardware Store," which aired on HGTV for four years.
