= At Home with Gary Sullivan =

American talk radio program

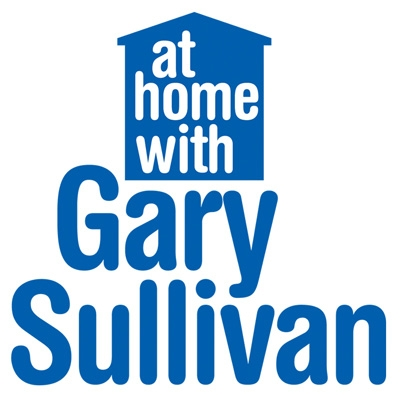
- Genre: Home improvement talk
- Running time: 3 hours Saturday (4 hours Saturday on WKRC); 3 hours Sunday
- Country of origin: United States
- Home station: WKRC (AM)
- Hosted by: Gary Sullivan
- Website: At Home with Gary Sullivan
- Podcast: www.garysullivanonline.com/podcast/garySullivanTips.xml

At Home with Gary Sullivan is a weekly home improvement talk radio program hosted by Gary Sullivan. The program is distributed by Premiere Networks.

== Availability ==
The program is syndicated to radio stations around the United States. The program is also available as a podcast.
