= Bill Handel =

American attorney and radio personality (born 1951)

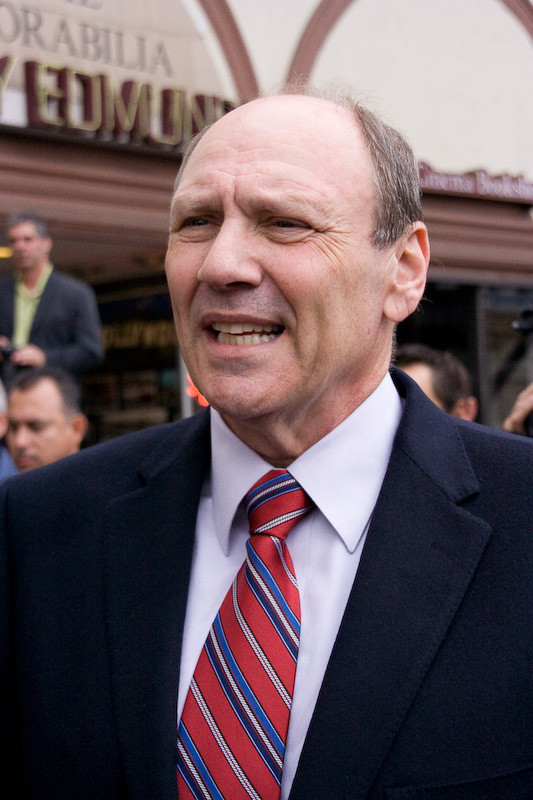
- Bill Handel, June 2009
- Born: William Wolf Handel; August 25, 1951 (age 75); São Paulo, Brazil
- Education: California State University, Northridge (B.A.); Whittier College (J.D.)
- Occupations: Attorney, radio host, commentator
- Spouse: Lyndsay Soprano Handel (Divorced from Marjorie Handel)
- Children: 2
- Website: handelonthelaw.com

William Wolf Handel (born August 25, 1951) is a Brazilian-born American radio host and attorney.

Handel currently hosts two radio programs on KFI in Los Angeles, California. First is KFI's local morning drive time show, in which he comments on current events. The program is one of the top rated morning programs in the Los Angeles radio market, with more than 1 million listeners. Additionally, he hosts a legal advice show on weekends called Handel on the Law, which launched in 1985 and is syndicated by Premiere Radio Networks, co-owned with KFI by iHeartMedia, Inc. Handel on the Law is heard on more than 150 stations in the U.S. He was also the director and founder of the Center for Surrogate Parenting.

His legal show is currently his longest running radio program to date. Both of Handel's shows played across the U.S. on the America's Talk channel 158 on XM Satellite Radio. In 2008, Handel's shows were discontinued by XM Radio when it merged with Sirius Satellite Radio.

== Early life and career ==
Handel was born in São Paulo, Brazil. His father Leo was from Yugoslavia, and his mother Nechama was a Polish Jew who grew up in Brazil. Handel's paternal grandparents were killed in the Holocaust. The Handel family emigrated to the U.S. when Bill was five years old.

He spent the remainder of his formative years growing up in the San Fernando Valley, attending Birmingham High School. He attended California State University, Northridge where he obtained his bachelor's degree in political science in 1976. He then started a construction company and attended the Whittier College School of Law at night, graduating with his J.D. in 1979. Around his graduation from law school, Handel became addicted to cocaine. In 1983, Handel underwent rehabilitation at St. John's Hospital in Santa Monica.

Later in the 1980s, Handel provided counsel for legal cases around surrogate parenting and founded the Center for Surrogate Parenting & Egg Donation.

In 1994, he hosted a weekly syndicated television show, Judge For Yourself, which was canceled due to low ratings and the lack of time in Handel's schedule. Judge For Yourself was unique in that it solicited comments from a 900 number, whose results would be broadcast on the next day's show.

He underwent bariatric surgery at Centinela Freeman Hospital to lose weight. Handel's experiences with this surgical procedure have been documented in a series of segments on his morning radio show.

== Radio work ==
Handel joined 640 KFI Los Angeles in 1989 doing a weekend legal show called "Handel On The Law." On July 16, 1993, Handel began broadcasting a talk and information wake up show, replacing the prior morning team. Prior to January 2014, The Bill Handel Show aired from 5 a.m. to 9 a.m., and was heavily news based. The first hour was primarily discussion of Handel's personal life, letters to the show, and banter with other staffers. The light banter in the 5 a.m. hour was cut when, in January 2014, the show moved to 6 a.m. to 10 a.m. time slot. It was later reduced to three hours, ending at 9:00 a.m.

On April 15, 1994, Handel hosted a Holocaust themed show live from Auschwitz, where his grandparents were killed. He planned on having two white nationalist guests including John Metzger, but the two guests were deported from Germany before they could appear on the show.

The show now begins with the Handel on the News, a summary of the morning's top stories delivered with Handel's commentary, with appropriate music cues starting each story and playing "under" his delivery. In the second and third hour, Handel has guests to discuss topics in the news. He often covers a single news story or item of interest for a half-hour, summarizing various other perspectives and offering his own opinion. Handel on the News: Late Edition airs at 8:30 am, is a condensed version of the 6 am hour, and includes stories not covered in the earlier version.

On his weekend show, Handel on the Law, he gives terse "marginal legal advice" designed to point callers in the right direction. He often makes fun of callers for getting themselves into their legal predicament, stating bluntly, "you have absolutely no case." Still, the show is informative in that it deals with many common legal problems, such as landlord-tenant and real estate issues, automobile accidents, child custody, and divorce in an easy-to-understand way. The show is heard Saturday mornings on KFI, but affiliate stations may air it at any time during the weekend.

From September 8, 2009 to February 12, 2010, Handel aired an additional show from noon to 2 p.m. on KFI after Dr. Laura Schlessinger moved from KFI to another Los Angeles talk station, 980 KFWB. Handel's afternoon show was syndicated to a handful of affiliates, though Premiere Radio Networks did not aggressively market the show. (It aired at the same time as the much more prominent The Sean Hannity Show.) Handel quit the show after five months.

On September 11, 2001, Handel was on air live when the terrorist attacks on the World Trade Center took place. Most of the Clear Channel FM music stations in Los Angeles switched over to a live feed of Handel's show as news reports and further attacks unfolded. At that time, Rush Limbaugh's show normally would follow The Bill Handel Show on KFI. Not only was Limbaugh on a plane heading to a golf tournament that day, but telecommunications systems were also devastated in New York, where his show was based at that time. Handel continued to broadcast for another three hours, taking the place of The Rush Limbaugh Show on most stations in the country (as well as the taped broadcast for Armed Forces Radio overseas). This led Handel to guest host on two more occasions on The Rush Limbaugh Show.

== Awards and honors ==
On September 23, 2005, Handel was named "Major Market Personality of the Year" at the 2005 NAB Marconi Radio Awards for his KFI show. During his acceptance speech, Handel said, “I haven't been this affected since my circumcision. Seriously, I'm proud and honored to be singled out for this incredible award.” On March 15, 2008 he was honored with "Local News/Talk/Sports Personality of the Year" by industry trade publication Radio & Records for the third time, his second being in 2007, and the first in 2005.

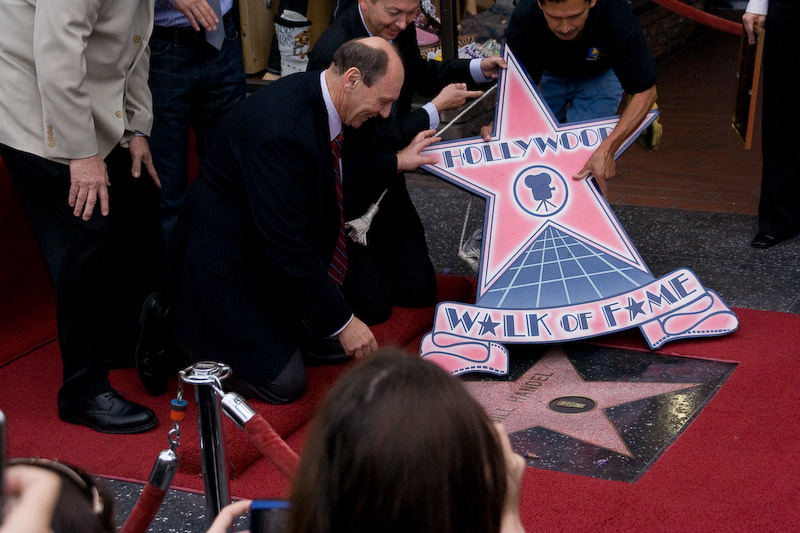
Bill Handel at the ceremony receiving his star on the Hollywood Walk Of Fame

Handel received the Distinguished Alumni Award from CSUN (Cal State University at Northridge) on April 26, 2008.

The alumni association of his alma mater, Whittier Law School, awarded him the "Humanitarian of the Year Award" on April 25, 2009. Handel says he has no idea why he was given this award. On June 19, 2008, the Hollywood Chamber of Commerce's Walk of Fame Committee announced that Handel would be one of 25 people the following year to receive a Star on the "Hollywood Walk of Fame." His star was unveiled on June 12, 2009, and is located at 6640 Hollywood Boulevard.

Handel was inducted into the "National Radio Hall of Fame" on November 2, 2017, in a ceremony at the Museum of Broadcast Communications in Chicago.

== Controversies ==
In 1996, Asian-American leaders called for Handel's resignation after making comments about Kristi Yamaguchi and Michelle Kwan. Handel was quoted as saying; "And when I look at a box of Wheaties, all right? I don't want to see eyes that are like all slanted and Oriental and almond shaped. I want American eyes looking at me." Handel apologized, claiming that he was mocking bigotry. In March 2004, Handel made jokes about Muslims not bathing, hating Jews, and practicing bestiality. KFI was forced to apologize.

On January 12, 2006, Handel joked that Muslim pilgrims to Mecca should hire traffic reporters to reduce the possibility of deadly incidents during the Hajj. The Council on American-Islamic Relations demanded an apology. Handel offered to apologize on the condition that CAIR would denounce terrorism, agree that Israel is a sovereign country, and claim it does not have ties with terrorists. CAIR did not take him up on his offer. Handel refused to apologize to CAIR, but did apologize to the actual victims of the Hajj stampede.

Shortly after the Hajj incident, Michelle Kube began to close each show with an all-encompassing apology covering nearly every group mentioned during the course of the show. It is intended to be funny and draw attention to the numerous groups and individuals Handel makes reference to who might be offended. The apology closes with the statement "and any and all...groups that might possibly have been offended during the broadcast of this show."

On December 15, 2006, KFI suspended Handel for one week after an on-air shouting match with Jamie White on FM sister station 98.7 KYSR. White allegedly told one of Handel's daughters to "get out" of his studio. Handel later apologized, claiming he lost his temper and had overreacted without having all the facts. Jamie White later said publicly as a guest on 97.1 KLSX (now KNX-FM) that she understood Handel's reaction as a parent and that she and Handel had seen each other months later at a radio event and "were fine."

On May 13, 2009, Handel commented on a show about health care that the U.S. government should "euthanize old people," "sell Glendale to get rid of the Armenians" and "get rid of the Irish and the Italians too." These comments were followed up the next day when a listener sent a letter requesting an apology for the remarks he made. After reading his letter aloud, his board operator, Lara Hermanson, joked that "what the Turks started, Bill will finish" referencing the Armenian genocide. KFI AM 640 Program Director Robin Bertolucci apologized and maintained that Handel was "clearly engaging in parody and hyperbole to point out the absurdity of genocide as a solution to rising health care costs. No one was actually advocating hatred against Armenians. The comments were obviously said in jest, in the same breath with advocating euthanasia for the elderly and genocide for the Jews. The comments made were solely mocking the idea of genocide and weren't intended to be about Armenians any more than they were about euthanasia for the elderly." On June 11, 2009, a formal apology was issued by Handel and Hermanson for their comments.

== Personal life ==
On March 20, 2025, Bill married his second wife Lyndsay Soprano-Handel in Italy.

Handel has a brother, Mark Handel, a real estate developer. Handel's brother was in 2022 accused of producing hardcore pornography, featuring slapping, choking and verbal abuse, under the name 'Khan Tusion'.
