= Canada 360 =

- Canada
- Broadcast area: Canada; United States
- Frequency: XM 172
- Branding: Canada 360

Programming
- Format: News Radio
- Affiliations: Canadian Press

Ownership
- Owner: Accessible Media

History
- First air date: 17 November 2005

Technical information
- Class: Satellite Radio Station

Links
- Website: Canada 360

Canada 360 was a Canadian 24-hour news radio station, which aired on SiriusXM. Operated by Accessible Media (AMI), the channel provided the latest news, sports, weather and border-crossing information. The channel was formerly programmed by Radio Development Group, owned by serial entrepreneur Evan Kosiner.

The station began airing in 2005 and became the world's first 24/7 headline news radio station, concurrently with the launch of XM Canada. Its typical hour was divided into four 15-minute segments with news and sports headlines sourced from Canadian Press, plus weather forecasts provided by The Weather Network.

The audio was encoded at 4 kbit/s mono and sounds similar to that of an AM broadcasting station. The channel's audio was vocal audio only, much like Sirius XM's other traffic and weather channels.

On 12 November 2008, Canada 360 was moved from Channel 244 to Channel 96. On 4 May 2011, Canada 360 was moved from Channel 96 to Channel 155. It could be heard last on Channel 172. Currently that position is held by SiriusXM Scoreboard.
