= Ron Wilson (Clear Channel radio host) =

American talk radio host

Ron Wilson is the host of the American nationally syndicated gardening tips and call-in program "In the Garden with Ron Wilson" which airs Saturdays from 6 to 9 a.m., Eastern Time, on many talk radio stations owned by iHeartMedia, Inc. The show originates from 550 WKRC in Cincinnati, Ohio, and is syndicated via iHeart-owned Premiere Networks.

Wilson also does a 2-hour version of the show from 10 a.m. to noon on Saturdays heard exclusively on 610 WTVN in Columbus, Ohio.
