= Rollye James =

American radio talk show host

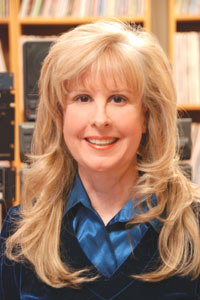
- Rollye James 2008
- Presenting career
- Show: The Rollye James Show
- Station: WGN Radio in Chicago or online at rollye.net
- Time slot: 10:00 PM - 1:00 AM (Central Time Zone)
- Style: Talk
- Country: United States
- Website: www.rollye.net

Rochelle "Rollye" James is an American radio talk show host. She hosted The Rollye James Show nationally and on international shortwave on WWCR from 2000 to 2011. Rollye revived her show, broadcasting weeknights 10p.m.–midnight, via live stream and podcast on June 19, 2013. It is now broadcast currently on WGN 720 in Chicago and on the web. She is also the author of "What Am I Doing Here? (when everything I want is somewhere else)", a motivational book punctuated with numerous historical radio anecdotes published by Nickajack Press. Rollye James was also a guest host on Coast to Coast AM on Friday and Monday nights for several months in 2000, which helped increase the audience for her own show.

== Career ==
=== Los Angeles ===
In Los Angeles, James worked at KPOL (AM) in 1979; KMPC and KHTZ in 1980, and later at KGIL and KLAC. She went back to KMPC in 1990 then and KFI (AM) until 1991, both also in Los Angeles.

=== Denver ===
The Rollye James show was on 850 KOA weeknights 9:00 til midnight from 1987 to 1991.

=== Austin ===
James worked at 590 KLBJ (AM) in Austin, Texas from January to October 1996. At the time, KLBJ was owned by the LBJ Holding Company, chaired by Luci Baines Johnson, whose father Lyndon B. Johnson had become U.S. president from the assassination of John F. Kennedy. On October 15, 1996, a caller to James' afternoon radio show mentioned a bumper sticker that read "Lee Harvey Oswald, where are you when we need you?" James' response was, "You know, unless that bullet passes through Al Gore first, I think we're in deeper trouble." Within an hour, in response to the first exchange, another person called into the show, saying "That's the same thing we were hearing right before the Kennedy assassination." and "With the kooks around nowadays, anything could happen." James replied with "I really don't think that I'm going to be able to cause anybody to take out Bill Clinton. But if I can, I hope their aim is good and I hope that bullet passes through Al Gore first. And if you want a trifecta, take Hillary, too." She also suggested that a caller should be a target as well.

The United States Secret Service investigated the incident. The station at first told the Secret Service that there were no tapes of the show, but later provided the tapes. Afterwards, Secret Service agent Shawn Campbell said that "criminal prosecution would not be appropriate" but that "It was improper and it was inappropriate and I think it went over the line of what we should do as a broadcaster, even if it wasn't against the law."

The comments upset Luci Baines Johnson and her mother, former First Lady Lady Bird Johnson. At the request of the Johnsons, the station's general manager suspended James and ordered her to apologize; after she made an on-air apology, but refused to guarantee to management and the Johnsons that she wouldn't make similar statements in the future, the station terminated James' employment on October 25. The general manager told the media, "We've had some disagreement in the show direction and that is primarily the reason." and "This was one in a series of events, but it's not the sole reason we ended the show." He also told Radio World, for a December 11, 1996 article, that James was terminated because the station thought her show "was going to be a little more down the middle and not necessarily mean or vitriolic". On November 1, the station sent a lunch invitation to its advertisers with "Ding Dong! The ... is gone!" with a picture of James on a broomstick in the middle of the sentence, followed by "Miss Rollye has taken her leave" and "The Woman and Week from Hell is behind us". When James requested payment for the remainder of her contract, the station refused, saying that she was the one who had breached the contract terms.

James and her company, Mediatrix, sued for breach of contract, intentional infliction of emotional distress, libel, and negligence in Travis County district court. She was represented by Steve Gibbins and Republican state representative Terry Keel. At the 1998 trial, Lady Bird Johnson and Luci Baines Johnson sat in the audience. The main points of James' case was that the management not only knew about, hired her for, and encouraged the type of commentary that she had used on the air, but then fired her, denied payment under the remainder of her contract, and made disparaging statements about her in order to justify the firing. James claimed that, to get the job at KLBJ, she had submitted an audition tape in which she said she regretted that Jean-Bertrand Aristide of Haiti hadn't been assassinated; that she had discussed, with the same station manager that fired her, the differences between her politics and that of the Johnson family; and that she was hired anyway, since the station management and the Johnsons "knew precisely what they were going to get" according to James, and the general manager said to her at hiring that, in reference to her and Rush Limbaugh, "Luci doesn't care how you make us money, as long as you don't care who she contributes it to". James' side also brought up KLBJ's own ad campaigns for her show; the ads highlighted, among other things, a suggestion that welfare recipients be shot. James also testified that she was told, by the program director and general manager, to erase the tapes of the October 15 episode in question, but that she responded that erasing the tapes might be obstruction of justice.

The jury in the case ruled in favor of James, awarding $170,000 from lost pay from her contract cancellation, and $535,000 for libel. A judge set aside the $535,000 libel award in July 1998, but left the breach of contract claim intact. An appeal was filed in Third Circuit state court of appeals, but the parties settled in October 2008: James and her company received $250,000 and agreed not to pursue the case further.

=== Philadelphia ===
By September 1998, James was working at WWDB in Philadelphia.

=== Chicago ===
"The Rollye James Show" currently airs in Chicago on WGN 720 AM.

== Personal life ==
Rollye and her husband Jon own KQSS and KJAA in the Globe-Miami, AZ area.
