= ReachMD =

- Broadcast area: United States
- Branding: ReachMD

Programming
- Format: Medical news, information, and continuing medical education
- Affiliations: iHeartRadio

Ownership
- Owner: US HealthConnect, Inc. (parent organization)

History
- First air date: 2007-03-26

Technical information
- Class: Internet Radio Station

Links
- Website: www.reachmd.com

ReachMD helps healthcare professionals discover, participate in, and share medical education and clinical information through on demand programming and 24/7 streaming broadcasts. Its content is offered on air, online, and via mobile apps and includes video, audio, slides, and text-based formats. The ReachMD distribution network includes websites and mobile apps of ReachMD, iHeartRadio, TuneIn, Stitcher, iTunes, and more. ReachMD has produced more than 10,000 medical broadcasts featuring clinical research, medical practice, disease management, and patient care strategies.

ReachMD launched on 26 March 2007 and was originally broadcast on XM Satellite radio, brought to XM Satellite in cooperation with Premiere Networks. On December 21, 2011, ReachMD was acquired by US HealthConnect Inc. with the intent to become an Internet Radio broadcaster. Effective October 18, 2013, ReachMD joined Clear Channel's iHeartRadio platform and became exclusively an Internet Radio broadcaster offering its content on air, online, and on mobile devices through Internet platforms. In 2014 ReachMD joined Tunein's platform, and in 2015 it joined Stitcher's platform (both of which are digital radio stations).

== Format ==
ReachMD offers pre-recorded programs in three categories: (1) continuing medical education (CME) content, which offers credit to participating healthcare professionals; (2) editorial content, which is curated by ReachMD's editors and medical staff; and (3) industry features, which are developed by enterprises in the life sciences industry.

ReachMD has more than 60 named series of pre-recorded programs (such as Lipid Luminations and Diabetes Discourse). The channel's original content is produced in the ReachMD headquarters in Fort Washington, PA, or is captured during live medical meetings nationwide.

=== Disclaimer ===
ReachMD emphasizes that the channel is made exclusively for medical professionals and not consumers. While website registration is not required to access content, if users register they receive customized content that matches their profession and specialty. Website registration is required to obtain CME or CE credits.

== Featured Series ==
- AudioAbstracts: Combining quick-read audio synopses with links to source material, AudioAbstracts is the smarter, faster way to stay current on medical literature.
- Book Club: Join ReachMD hosts as they explore various genres in medical literature either for intellectual sustenance or for joy and entertainment.
- Clinician's Roundtable: Interviews with the top thought leaders in medicine exploring the clinical and professional issues that are foremost in the minds of the medical community.
- Conference Coverage: Conference Coverage brings to life medical conferences from around the world.
- Crohn's & Colitis Foundation Perspectives: providing the latest information on research, treatments, and management of IBD, produced in collaboration with the Crohn’s & Colitis Foundation.
- Diabetes Discourse: Features renowned healthcare professionals discussing the latest topics on diabetes: therapies, research, technology, clinical studies, treatments, and more.
- FDA Drug Information Updates: Features public safety notices, patient safety news, and more.
- GI Insights: Highlights the latest clinical issues, trends and technologies in gastroenterological practice, partnered with the American Gastroenterological Association (AGA).
- Grand Rounds Nation: ReachMD brings the lecture halls to you, with outstanding talks from top academic centers.
- Inside Medicare's New Payment System: This series from the American Medical Association provides an inside look at what physicians can do to prepare for the transition to MACRA.
- Lipid Luminations: A series focusing on the field of lipidology, highlighting recent advances in lipid management and heart disease. This series is sponsored by the National Lipid Association.
- Medical Breakthroughs from Penn Medicine: features the newest medical advancements in the areas of oncology, cardiology, neurosciences, orthopedics, and genetics featuring leading figures from Penn Medicine.
- NutritionEdge: Explores the latest scientific updates, sociopolitical initiatives, and controversial practice trends in nutrition and dietetics.
- Partners in Practice: Provides insight into the issues experienced by advanced practice healthcare clinicians delivering care to diverse populations, interfacing with other healthcare providers, and navigating their own career issues.
- Primary Care Today: Features conversations with clinical experts representing a wide range of medical specialties to highlight the latest trends in primary care practice.
- Project Oncology: Focuses on a wide array of oncology topics enlightening practitioners on late-breaking discoveries, novel treatment options, evolving methods of patient management, and more.
- The Pule of Emergency Medicine: Educating listeners on the latest information, guidelines and best practices for critical care medical professionals. This series is produced in partnership with the American College of Emergency Physicians (ACEP).
- Women's Health Fridays: Features faculty experts addressing a variety of clinically relevant and controversial topics facing female patients of all ages.

== Online Streaming and Podcasts ==
ReachMD is an Internet Radio channel that offers online streaming radio 24/7 on the websites and mobile apps of ReachMD, iHeartRadio, and Tunein. On demand programming is offered on the websites and mobile apps of ReachMD, iHeartRadio, Tunein, and Stitcher. Podcast downloads are offered on iTunes and Stitcher.

== See also ==
- US HealthConnect, Inc.
- iHeartRadio
- Tunein
- Stitcher Radio
- iTunes
