= Premiere Networks =

American radio network

Premiere Networks, Inc.
- Formerly: Premiere Radio Networks
- Type: Subsidiary
- Industry: Radio broadcasting; Advertising
- Founded: 1987; 39 years ago
- Founders: Steve Lehman; Tim Kelly; Louise Palanker; Ed Mann
- Headquarters: Sherman Oaks, California, United States
- Key people: Julie Talbott (President)
- Parent: Jacor Communications (1997–1999); iHeartMedia (1999–present)
- Website: www.premierenetworks.com

Premiere Networks, Inc. (formerly Premiere Radio Networks, shortened as PRN) is an American media company, a subsidiary of iHeartMedia, for which it currently serves as its main original radio content distribution and production arm. It is the largest syndication company in the United States. Founded independently in 1987, it is headed by Julie Talbott, who serves as president.

Premiere Networks either syndicates and/or (co-)produces more than 90 individual programs and radio programming services/networks to more than 5,500 affiliates across the U.S., reaching about 245 million listeners monthly. Premiere offers talk, entertainment and sports programming featuring well-known personalities including Ryan Seacrest, Delilah, JoJo Wright, Mario Lopez, Bobby Bones, Crook & Chase, Clay Travis and Buck Sexton, Glenn Beck, Steve Harvey, Big Boy, George Noory, John Boy and Billy, Sean Hannity, Elvis Duran, Dan Patrick, Bill Cunningham, Cody Alan, Johnjay and Rich, Jay Mohr, Leo Laporte and others. The company is based in Sherman Oaks, California, with 13 offices nationwide.

Many Premiere produced/distributed programs are also available on several on-demand audio streaming services, including iHeartMedia's own iHeartRadio platform and iHeart.com website.

It also acts as a Primary Entry Point in the Emergency Alert System for its terrestrial radio affiliates.

== History ==
Premiere was founded in 1987 with an investment of US$30,000 (equivalent to $85,000 in 2025). Founders included Steve Lehman, Tim Kelly, Louise Palanker and Ed Mann. The network produced three programs with approximately 250 affiliates. In 1992, Premiere entered into an agreement with Mediabase, and later acquired the said company in 1994.

In 1997, Jacor Communications acquired both Premiere and EFM Media (producer of the talk program The Rush Limbaugh Show), and in turn, Clear Channel Communications ultimately bought Jacor. Following the merger with AMFM Inc. in 2000, its syndication arm, AMFM Radio Networks, and its radio shows, were folded into Premiere's operations.

Premiere entered a long-term agreement with Fox Sports to launch Fox Sports Radio, with Premiere handling distribution of the network to radio affiliates.

== Distribution ==
Premiere Networks' programs are currently distributed over satellite, NexGen Digital WANcasting, and downloadable via FTP. The FTP server serves both primary and backup delivery needs for weekly pre-recorded content. For years, Premiere used the popular Starguide Digital III satellite system to distribute their programs prior to their transition to X-Digital Systems (XDS) for satellite delivery.

Premiere's entertainment programs are distributed on a mixture of fee and barter-based deals.

== Program schedule ==
All times are Eastern. Programs are organized alphabetically by franchise and display their date and time if they're available for online download, and additional information.

=== Entertainment ===
| Title | Day | Time | Download | Sirius/XM | Notes |
|---|---|---|---|---|---|
| American Top 40 (CHR) with Ryan Seacrest | Weekends | FTP/download | No | No | Part of the American Top 40 franchise. The CHR version used to air on SiriusXM's simulcasts of Z100 and KIIS-FM |
| American Top 40 (Hot AC) with Ryan Seacrest | Weekends | FTP/download | No | No | Part of the American Top 40 franchise. The CHR version used to air on SiriusXM's simulcasts of Z100 and KIIS-FM |
| Casey Kasem's American Top 40: The 70s | N/A | FTP/download | No | Yes | Part of the American Top 40 franchise, reruns of AT40 episodes from the 1970s |
| Casey Kasem's American Top 40: The 80s | N/A | FTP/download | No | No | Part of the American Top 40 franchise, used to air on SiriusXM's '80s on 8 channel |
| Casey Kasem's American Top 40: The 90s | N/A | FTP/download | No | No | Part of the American Top 40 franchise |
| Casey Kasem's American Top 40: The 2000s | N/A | FTP/download | No | No | Part of the American Top 40 franchise |
| Big Boy's Neighborhood | Weekdays | 6A-10A | No | No | |
| The Bobby Bones Show | Weekdays | 6A-11A | No | No | |
| Crook & Chase Countdown | Weekends | FTP/download | No | No | Produced by Jim Owens Entertainment. |
| Delilah | Everyday | 7P-12M | No | No | |
| Delilah Gold-based AC | Everyday | 7P-12M | No | No | |
| Elvis Duran and the Morning Show | Weekdays | 6A-10A | No | No | Produced by The Elvis Duran Group. *Based on New York radio station Z100, which was moved to SiriusXM's internet network |
| Elvis Duran Weekend | Weekends | 8A-noon | No | No | Produced by The Elvis Duran Group. For air Saturday or Sunday mornings. |
| Elvis Duran and the Pre-Morning Show | Weekdays | 5A-6A | No | No | Produced by The Elvis Duran Group. For air the following early morning. |
| iHeartRadio Countdown (CHR) with JoJo Wright | Weekends | FTP/download | No | Yes | Airs between 6AM and 12 noon local time. Plays on SiriusXM channel 11 (KIIS) Sunday nights |
| iHeartRadio Countdown (Hot AC) with Mario Lopez | Weekends | FTP/download | No | No | Airs between 6AM and 12 noon local time. |
| The Keith Sweat Hotel | Sun-Fri. | 7P-midnight | No | No | Known as "The Quiet Storm" in some markets. |
| Most Requested Live with Romeo Early Edition | Saturdays | 7P-10P | No | No | Produced by Superadio Network. |
| Most Requested Live with Romeo Late Edition | Saturdays | 10P-midnight | No | No | Produced by Superadio Network. |
| On Air with Ryan Seacrest | Weekdays | FTP/download | Yes | Yes | For air between 10 AM and 7 PM local time. |
| On the Move with Enrique Santos | Saturdays | 10A-2P | No | No | For air between 10 AM and 7 PM local time. |
| ON with Mario Lopez | Weekdays | FTP/download | No | No | For air between 3 PM and midnight local time. |
| The Breakfast Club | Weekdays | 6A-10A | | | |
| Smooth Jazz Top 20 with Allen Kepler | Weekends | FTP/download | No | Yes | Part of the Smooth Jazz Network |
| The Steve Harvey Morning Show | Weekdays | 6A-10A | No | No | |
| The Woody Show | Weekdays | 3A-7A | No | No | |

=== Talk ===
| Title | Day | Time | Download | Sirius/XM | Notes |
|---|---|---|---|---|---|
| In The Garden with Ron Wilson | Saturdays | 6A-9A | Yes | No | Flagship station is WKRC Cincinnati. |
| At Home with Gary Sullivan | Weekends | 9A-noon | Yes | No | Flagship station is WKRC Cincinnati. |
| The Ben Ferguson Show | Sundays | 6P-9P | Yes | No | |
| The Jesse Kelly Show | Weekdays | 6P-9P ET | Yes | No | |
| Coast to Coast AM with George Noory | Tues-Sat | Live: *1A-5A (ET); *10P-2A (PT); Replay: *2A-6A (PT; for West Coast stations only) | Yes | Yes | |
| Coast to Coast AM Saturdays | Sunday | 1A-5A | Yes | Yes | Hosting duties rotate between Connie Willis, Lisa Garr, Richard Syrett or Jimmy Church. |
| Coast to Coast AM Sundays | Monday | 1A-5A | Yes | Yes | Hosting duties rotate between George Noory (first Sunday), George Knapp (third and fourth Sunday), and selected guest hosts (second and fifth Sunday). |
| Somewhere in Time with Art Bell | Saturday | 9P-1A | Yes | No | Encore presentations of "Coast to Coast AM" shows hosted by Art Bell dating back to 1996. |
| Coast to Coast AM Best of George Noory | Sunday | 9P-1A | Yes | No | Select segments from previous week's Coast to Coast AM with George Noory. |
| Your Morning Show with Michael DelGiorno | Weekdays | 6A-9A | Yes | No | Flagship station is WLAC Nashville |
| The Glenn Beck Radio Program | Weekdays | 9A-noon | Yes | Yes | Produced by Mercury Radio Arts. |
| The Glenn Beck Weekend | Fridays | 1P-4P | Yes | Yes | Produced by Mercury Radio Arts. For air weekends. |
| Handel on the Law | Saturdays | 9A-noon | Yes | No | Hosted by Bill Handel, this show is taped and edited for national distribution, after it airs live on its flagship KFI Los Angeles. |
| The Jesus Christ Show | Sundays | 9A-noon | Yes | No | Host Neil Saavedra takes calls from listeners, portraying himself in the role of Jesus Christ. Its flagship is KFI, Los Angeles. |
| Keep Hope Alive with Jesse Jackson | Sundays | 8A-10A | No | No | As of 2025, his daughter Santita Jackson has been hosting the show (in addition to her Executive Producer role) following his hospitalization. Jesse Jackson died in February 2026. |
| Sunday Night with Bill Cunningham | Sunday | 10P-1A | Yes | No | Produced by DirecTV. Premiere handles sales and distribution. Flagship station is WLW Cincinnati. |
| The Clay Travis and Buck Sexton Show | Weekdays | noon-3P | Yes | No | Replaced The Rush Limbaugh Show after his death in 2021. |
| The Sean Hannity Show | Weekdays | 3P-6P | Yes | Yes | |
| The Weekend with Michael Brown | Saturday | noon-3P | No | No | Flagship station is KHOW Denver. |
| Verdict with Ted Cruz | Weekends | FTP/download | Yes | No | This is the weekly syndicated radio version of his own podcast show (co-hosted with Ben Ferguson). To avoid conflict of interest and campaign finance issues, Cruz will not be paid for hosting the program. |
| The Sean Hannity Morning Minute | Weekdays | 10:03:30 PM | No | No | |
| Direct From Hollywood with Ryan Seacrest | Weekdays | 3:01:00 AM | No | No | For morning drive. |
| Direct From Hollywood with Ryan Seacrest | Weekdays | 4:01:00 AM | No | No | For afternoon drive. |
| Dan Patrick's Above the Noise | Weekdays | 10:01:30 AM | No | No | |

- The show requires a paid subscription to download.

=== Premiere Sports Network ===
| Title | Day | Time | Download | Sirius/XM | Notes |
|---|---|---|---|---|---|
| Two Pros and A Cup of Joe with Jonas Knox, LaVar Arrington, and Brady Quinn | Weekdays | 6A-9A | Yes | Yes | |
| Two Pros and A Cup of Joe with Jonas Knox, LaVar Arrington, and Brady Quinn | Saturday | 4P-7P | Yes | Yes | |
| The Dan Patrick Show | Weekdays | 9A-noon | Yes | Yes | DIRECTV Sports Group owns and produces the show while Premiere handles distribution and sales. |
| The Herd with Colin Cowherd | Weekdays | noon-3P | | Yes | |
| The Doug Gottlieb Show | Weekdays | 3P-6P | Yes | Yes | |
| Straight Outta Vegas with R.J. Bell | Weekdays | 6P-7P | Yes | Yes | |
| The Odd Couple with Chris Broussard and Rob Parker | Weekdays | 7P-10P | Yes | Yes | |
| The Jason Smith Show | Weekdays | 10P-2A | Yes | Yes | |
| Ben Maller | Weekdays | 2A-6A | Yes | Yes | |
| Fox NFL Sunday with Terry Bradshaw, Jimmy Johnson, Howie Long, Curt Menefee, and Michael Strahan | Sunday | noon-1P | No | Yes | Television audio simulcast from FOX. Premiere Radio Networks distributes the show to radio. The program only broadcasts from September through February. |
| Big Ten Football and Beyond with Dave Revsine, Gerry DiNardo, and Chris Martin | Thursday | 6P-7P | No | No | This program is only broadcasts from September through April. It is fed separate from the main network, and intended for playback on weekends. |
| PAC-12 Crackback with Petros Papdakis & Steve Physioc | Wednesday | 6P-7P | No | No | This program is only broadcasts from September through April. It is fed separate from the main network, and intended for playback on weekends. |
| The Mike North Show | Saturday | 9A-noon | No | Yes | |
| The Mike North Show | Sunday | 10P-1A | No | Yes | |
| Fox Gametime with Anthony Gargano & Lincoln Kennedy | Saturday | noon-4P | No | Yes | |
| Race Day on Fox with Rob D’Amico | Sunday | 7A-9A | No | Yes | |
| NFL Central with Mike North | Sunday | 9A-10A | No | Yes | |
| Fox Fantasy Football with Nate Lundy, Peter Burns and Mike Harmon | Sunday | 10A-noon | No | Yes | |
| The Fox Blitz with Ben Maller & Tomm Looney | Sunday | 1P-7P | No | Yes | |
| Fox Gametime React with Andy Furman & Lincoln Kennedy | Sunday | 7P-10P | No | Yes | |

=== Fox News Radio ===
Premiere Radio handles distribution and sales only for Fox News Radio programs.

=== Former programs ===
- The Bob & Tom Show (Moved to Westwood One in 2014)
- Hot Mix (Un-hosted - Dance mix show... 1998 - 2001)
- The Jim Rome Show (Moved to CBS Sports Radio when the network launched in January 2013)
- Rick Dees Weekly Top 40 (moved to Dial Global/Triton Radio in 2006, Citadel Media in 2009, Westwood One/Dial Global in 2011, and now at Compass Media Networks since 2012.)
- Carson Daly Most Requested (Show ended when 5-year contract was up in 2006)
- Last Night on Tonight with Jay Leno (moved to Westwood One, January 2007)
- The Ramsey Lewis Morning Show (ended in 2009 when WNUA switched formats)
- Legends of Jazz with Ramsey Lewis (moved to WDCB in Chicago)
- The Phil Hendrie Show (Hendrie left in 2006 to pursue a career in television, he later announced a return, but on Talk Radio Network)
- The Ken Hamblin Show (Hamblin left the show mid-90s)
- After Hours with Glenn Hollis (cancelled in 2005)
- Boot Scootin' Partyin' Nights with Bo Reynolds (later Hollywood Harrison)-- cancelled mid-90s, Reynolds hosts a similar show on another network now
- Star & Buc Wild Morning Show (immediately cancelled in 2006 after DJ Star threatened the daughter of DJ Envy (currently one of the co-hosts of The Breakfast Club) who was then at rival station WQHT. Later moved to Pulse 87, currently out of radio)
- Michael Reagan (moved to Radio America in 2003, then to American Family Radio in 2009, currently out of radio)
- Rockline (moved to Crystal Media Networks in 2003, then to Dial Global in 2008)
- "Live From the 60's with the Real Don Steele". A syndicated 3 hour radio program marketed to radio stations with an Oldies format. It launched in early 1988 and aired over 200 radio stations before ending production in 1993. Some stations continued airing reruns from 1993-1996. Steele died in August 1997 from lung cancer; producer M. G. Kelly took over the show, retooled it into American Hit List, and distributes the show himself. In 2015, "Live From the 60's" was re-launched with MG Kelly producing and syndicating the show out himself.
- Lionel (cancelled in 2001, revived and moved to WOR Radio Network and later Air America Radio)
- Dreamland with Art Bell, later Whitley Strieber (replaced by Matt Drudge and Ian Punnett; now heard online exclusively.)
- Jeff Rense (left in 1998, went to Genesis Communications Network, now at Republic Broadcasting Network)
- Sex with Dr. Natasha - Ended in Spring 2004 out of fear of being cited or fined by the FCC, as part of its crackdown following the Super Bowl XXXVIII halftime show controversy.
- After Midnite - 1993 to 2013, country music show hosted by Blair Garner. Garner departed for Cumulus Media Networks. The After Midnite name is, as of late 2013, being used for various guest hosts in the time slot.
- Matt Drudge. Drudge voluntarily ended his show on September 30, 2007; Drudge would keep with this Drudge Report Web site and continue hosting as a guest host on various shows, most notably Clear Channel radio shows.
- Wake Up With Whoopi - canceled in November 2007.
- Kidd Kraddick in the Morning (moved to ABC Radio, February 2008)
- Mid-day with Mike McConnell - Reverted to a local show in February 2008.
- Radio Kandy - Hot AC countdown show hosted by John Candy. Lasted from 1988 to 1990.
- Costas on the Radio - show ended May 31, 2009 so that Bob Costas could concentrate on his other projects.
- American Top 20 and American Top 10 with Casey Kasem - Ended July 3, 2009 after Kasem retired.
- Premiere also syndicated the Cutler Comedy Networks, a series of sketches and parody songs for morning drive time radio programs produced and written by Gil Christner.
- Dr. Laura - moved to satellite radio in 2011
- The Dave Koz Radio Show - moved to Compass Media Networks in 2013
- Big D and Bubba - moved to Compass Media Networks ca. 2014.
- Dawson McAllister Live - ended in 2012; moved to Benztown Radio/Hollywood Radio Network in 2015, then to the Dawson McAllister Network.
- Evolution with Pete Tong - ended in December 2016. Also known as the "Evolution Beatport Show".
- The Randi Rhodes Show - Following the demise of the Nova M Network, Rhodes' show was distributed by Premiere Radio Networks from 2009 to 2014, when she voluntarily ended her show. It was one of the network's highest-rated liberal shows, but Rhodes chafed at how it was treated by the company. Following the end of the PRN show, Rhodes took time off to regroup, then returned in 2016 with a subscription-based show, stating that she had ended the PRN show because the network did very little if anything to promote her, claiming that liberal talk radio was a losing proposition.
- Sixx Sense with Nikki Sixx and Jenn Marino, and The Side Show Countdown with Nikki Sixx and Jenn Marino - ended in December 2017.
- The Rush Limbaugh Show - ended in 2021 due to Limbaugh's death.
- The Weekend Top 30 and Remix Top 30 with Hollywood Hamilton (or DJ Pup Dawg) - ended in 2021
- Leo Laporte, The Tech Guy
