= XM Satellite Radio channel history =

This is a list of former channels on XM Satellite Radio, in addition to information on format changes of existing channels. Also included is information on temporary channels and seasonal channels.

== Before the Sirius and XM channel lineup merger ==
These actions took place before November 12, 2008, the merger of the Sirius and XM channel lineups.

=== Format changes ===
Most of these XM channels still exist on the lineup, but have made changes to its presentation method or playlist:

- ESPN Xtra – Was 24/7 ESPNEWS TV audio rebroadcast until 2008-02-04.
- XM Café – Was formerly titled Starbucks XM Café from 2007-07-31 until 2008-09-30. On November 12, 2008, the name was changed to The Spectrum.
- Quoi de Neuf – Was Art and Entertainment news and information until 2007-04-09.
- Radio Parallèle – Was Men's Lifestyle and Sports Talk until 2007-04-06. This channel titled SportPlus until 2007-04-06 and Franc Parler from 2005-11-17 to 2006-04-17.
- Fuego – Was Latin Pop until August 14, 2005. This channel titled Alegria until April 17, 2006. It was later dropped from the line-up altogether.
- The Pink Channel – Was a simulcast WLTW in New York City, New York until December 1, 2003, and formerly titled Lite. Following the format flip, the channel was titled Sunny. This title remained until 2008-08-18. Among the formats for Sunny were Beautiful Music until May 1, 2006, Nostalgic Music until June 2006, AM Gold music, and finally Early AC.
- Highway 16 – Was 1990s and 2000s (decade) Country on channel 15 until December 1, 2003. Formerly titled Highway 15. It is now known as simply The Highway.
- KISS 104.1 – Simulcast KIIS-FM/KVVS in Los Angeles, California until December 1, 2003. Flipped to "hits of the 90s and today" in June 2006.
- MIX – Simulcast KHMX in Houston, Texas until December 1, 2003. Changed again May 1, 2006, to play wider array of hit music from 1970s onward.
- Nashville! – Simulcast WSIX in Nashville, Tennessee until December 1, 2003. Formerly titled WSIX.
- The Verge – Was Unsigned Artists until November 17, 2005. It is now a channel programmed by Canadian Satellite Radio. Its original name was Unsigned, and after that, (un)Signed.
- Top Tracks – Played Classic rock until shifting to early classic rock on March 1, 2006. Later classic rock was spun off into Big Tracks. After the merger with Sirius, the channels became Classic Vinyl and Classic Rewind respectively.
- Top 20 on 20 – Played pop and Contemporary hits, was available online and repositioned to a "pop music discovery" outlet, on July 17, 2014, the channel was replaced with Venus

=== Defunct channels ===
These channels are no longer part of the XM platform:

- BET Uptown (XM62) – Adult R&B Hits and Urban Adult Contemporary station from BET. Brought in-house and changed to Suite 62.
- CNET Radio (XM130) – A simulcast of KNEW in San Francisco. The station was about news and information regarding technology. It changed formats due to financial losses. (Removed on 2/1/04)
- C-Wave (XM105) – Outsourced Chinese language music channel. Was deleted when XM decided to move more programming in-house. (Removed on 8/26/02.)
- CNNfn (XM128) – Complete coverage of business news. The network was shut down in 2004. (Removed on 12/2/02.)
- CNN Sports Illustrated (XM141) – Sports News and In-Depth Features. The network was shut down on May 15, 2002. (Removed around 5/12/02)
- USA Today (XM121) – News from USA Today and its staff in collaboration with XM. (Removed on 12/2/02.)
- Discovery Channel Radio (XM161) – Discovery Channel programming. Originally programmed 24/7, then during nights and weekends. (Was removed on 9/1/05)
- Babble On (XM168) – Talk channel geared towards teenage audience, deleted for low listenership. One of the first programming casualties of XM. (Removed on 12/2/02.)
- Playboy Radio (XM205) – Premium channel provided by Playboy for an extra $4.99 a month. Was deleted due to low subscription turnout. (Added to lineup on 8/26/02. Removed on 9/1/05.) It has now resurfaced on Sirius Satellite Radio. It is available without an additional fee, but subscribers must "opt in" to receive the channel.
- MTV Radio (XM155) – MTV audio simulcasts and pop hits. Also included Headbangers Ball and various MTV award shows. (Original channel that was on 25. Moved to 155 on 2/1/04. Removed from satellite lineup on 9/30/05.)
- VH1 Radio (XM156) – VH1 audio simulcasts and pop hits. Also included Behind the Music. (Original channel that was on 24. Moved to 156 on 2/1/04. Removed from satellite lineup on 9/30/05.)
- Buzz XM (XM166) – Hot Talk station provided for Clear Channel terrestrial talk shows, renamed "America Right" to complement Air America (originally called "America Left" but changed when Air America signed an exclusive deal with XM) (Was removed on 4/5/04)
- XM News (XM120) – In-house news service. Third party channels defeated its purpose. (Was removed on 8/26/02.)
- Tejano (XM93) – Tejano music channel owned and produced by Univision. When XM went to commercial free music, Univision pulled out.
- Radio Taj (XM104) – Outsourced Indian language music channel. Was deleted when XM decided to move more programming in-house. (Removed on 8/26/02.)
- Red Cross Radio (XM248) - A temporary channel used to aid victims of the Hurricane Katrina crisis.
- NASCAR 2 (XM145) – Second NASCAR channel for pit crew audio. Added on 9/4/04. This station ended after the 2005 racing season and has not returned.
- Sporting News Radio (XM143) – This channel simulcasted the entire Sporting News Radio lineup until 8/28/06, when it was replaced with XM's in-house sports channel XM Sports Nation. The new channel still plays select SNR shows, especially on weekends.
- MSNBC (XM130) – TV audio rebroadcast. Was removed on 9/4/06 due to scheduling changes across the XM platform. Returned to SiriusXM 4/12/10.
- NASCAR Radio (XM144) – NASCAR Racing and Talk. Was removed on 1/1/07 as the NASCAR contract expired and NASCAR's new deal with Sirius started. XM Produced shows were merged into XM Sports Nation, which now occupies the channel number.
- Hear Music (XM 75) – The Voice of Music at Starbucks. Was removed on 2007-07-31, as bandwidth was used for XMX. This channel merged with XM Café to create Starbucks XM Café.
- ABC News & Talk (XM 124) – News/talk and entertainment. Was removed on 2007-09-24, as Citadel Broadcasting shut down operations of, or sold off, its satellite networks as a cost-cutting measure.
- The Flow (XM61) – Neo-soul music. This channel moved from the satellites to online only. Removed on 2008-07-15.
- The Torch (XM31) – Christian rock music. This channel moved from the satellites to online only, and was also on DirecTV. Removed on 2008-07-15.
- Luna (XM530) – Latin Jazz music. This channel moved from the satellites to online only, then returned to the air as a SiriusXM Xtra Channel.
- On the Rocks (XM79) – Lounge music. This channel moved from the satellites to online only. Removed on 2008-07-15.
- XM Music Lab (XM51) – Progressive rock and jam bands. This channel moved from the satellites to online only. Removed on 2008-07-15.
- Fuego (XM90) – Reggaeton, Latin Hip-hop & Hispanic Rhythmic. This channel moved from the satellites to online only, and was also on DirecTV. Removed on 2008-07-15.
- Special X (XM154) – Freeform novelty music. This channel moved from the satellites to online only, and was also on DirecTV. Removed on 2008-07-15.
- WSIX (XM161) – Simulcast of Nashville, Tennessee–based Country music station. Removed on 2008-08-08.
- xL Fungus (XM53) Uncensored punk, Hardcore and Ska music. – Removed on 2008-09-15
- XMX (XM2) – XM Featured Shows. Removed on 2008-11-12 after the merger of the SIRIUS and XM channel lineups.
- xL The Rhyme (XM65) – Uncensored Classic Hip-Hop. Removed on 2008-11-12 after the merger of the SIRIUS and XM channel lineups.
- Beyond Jazz (XM72) – Progressive Jazz and Modern Jazz music. Removed on 2008-11-12 after the merger of the SIRIUS and XM channel lineups.
- Fine Tuning (XM76) – Eclectic. Removed on 2008-11-12 after the merger of the SIRIUS and XM channel lineups.
- Chrome (XM83) – Classic Dance and Disco. Removed on 2008-11-12 after the merge of the SIRIUS and XM channel lineups. Replaced by The Strobe in January 2009 on channel 83.
- Aguila (XM92) – Regional Mexican. Removed on 2008-11-12 after the merger of the SIRIUS and XM channel lineups.
- Caricia (XM93) – Spanish Oldies. Removed on 2008-11-12 after the merger of the SIRIUS and XM channel lineups.
- The Weather Channel (XM125) – 24/7 Weather Radio Network. Removed on 2008-11-12 after the merger of the SIRIUS and XM channel lineups. Content is now aired on Sirius XM Weather & Emergency channel 247.
- XM Sports Nation (XM144) – Sports Talk and Play-by-Play. Removed on 2008-11-12 after the merger of the SIRIUS and XM channel lineups. Returned in 2009 on channel 143.
- E! Entertainment Radio (XM162) – Entertainment News and Celebrity Gossip. Removed on 2008-11-08 prior to the merger of the SIRIUS and XM channel lineups.
- Vibra – Rock en Español. Removed from DirecTV on 2008-11-12 after the merger of the SIRIUS and XM channel lineups.

=== Channels which changed ownership ===
- The Roadhouse – Programmed by XM Radio until 2011. This station is not present on XM anymore.
- The Torch – Programmed by Salem Communications until 2006, then programmed by XM Radio. This station is not present on XM anymore.
- The Message – Programmed by Salem Communications until 2006 under Salem's trademark brand The Fish, now programmed by XM Radio.
- Spirit – Programmed by Radio One, Inc. until 2004, now programmed by XM Radio.
- The Verge – Programmed by XM Radio until November 2005 as Unsigned, now programmed by XM Radio Canada.
- The Flow – Programmed by Radio One, Inc. until 2004, now programmed by XM Radio. This station is not present on XM anymore.
- RAW – Programmed by Radio One, Inc. until 2004, then programmed by XM Radio. This station is not present on XM anymore.
- The City – Programmed by Radio One, Inc. until 2004, then programmed by XM Radio. This station is not present on XM anymore.
- Top 20 on 20 – Programmed by XM Radio until 2008, then programmed by Sirius XM Radio until 2014. This station is not present on XM anymore.
- Fuego – Programmed by Hispanic Broadcasting Corporation under the name Alegria with a Latin Pop format, until it merged with Univision Radio in 2002. Univision Radio programmed the channel until 2004. It was then programmed by XM Radio, who changed its name and format. This station is not present on XM anymore.
- Caliente – Programmed by Hispanic Broadcasting Corporation, until it merged with Univision Radio in 2002. Univision Radio programmed the channel until 2004. Now programmed by XM Radio.
- Aguila – Programmed by Hispanic Broadcasting Corporation, until it merged with Univision Radio in 2002. Univision Radio programmed the channel until 2004. It was then programmed by XM Radio. This station is not present on XM anymore.
- Vibra – Programmed by Hispanic Broadcasting Corporation, until it merged with Univision Radio in 2002. Univision Radio programmed the channel until 2004. It was then programmed by XM Radio, and was a DirecTV exclusive. This station is not present on XM anymore.
- Caricia – Programmed by Hispanic Broadcasting Corporation, until it merged with Univision Radio in 2002. Univision Radio programmed the channel until 2004. It's now programmed by XM Radio. On 2008-01-01, this channel returned to the satellite broadcasting with a Spanish Oldies format. This station is not present on XM anymore.
- America Right – Programmed by Clear Channel Communications until May 2006. Now programmed by XM Radio.
- ABC News & Talk – Programmed by ABC Radio until 2007-06-12. Programming was turned over to Citadel Broadcasting as part of the merger between Citadel and ABC Radio. This station is not present on XM anymore.
- The Power – Programmed by Radio One, Inc. until 2008-01-01, now programmed by XM Radio.

=== Channels canceled before launch ===
- XM announced in April 2006 that in late spring/early summer six regional News & Talk channels (XM 134-XM 139) would be added and provide regional news coverage for every area of the continental US. These channels were to have been provided by Clear Channel Communications and were to have been located in "Regional News, Talk & Music Channels." According to Jon Zellner via a subscriber email, Clear Channel decided to forego the launch of these channels. The original plan was to create a set of regionalized, five-minute newscasts. Each newscast was to carry 90 seconds of advertising, with the 3:30-minute balance devoted to regionally targeted news. The channels were to be titled:
  - Northeast News and Talk
  - Southeast News and Talk
  - Midwest News and Talk
  - Middle America News and Talk
  - Southwest News and Talk
  - Northwest News and Talk

=== Channels of unknown status ===
- XM Announced on 2006-01-31 that they would be adding Traffic & Weather channels for Cincinnati, Cleveland, Denver-Boulder, Milwaukee-Racine, Portland, Providence-Warwick-Pawtucket, Sacramento, San Antonio and Wilmington, DE to their NavTraffic product during the first quarter 2006. Rumors that a Traffic & Weather station could be dropped for Cincinnati due to the addition of WLW on XM channel 173 were unfounded as WLW was dropped from the XM service in 2009.

=== Seasonal and holiday channels ===
These channels are season- and holiday-based, and are only around for a part of the year. It is not uncommon that they take the place of an existing channel. As of 2014, Sirius XM has reduced the periods that some of the holiday channels run for the 2015 season with only Holly and Holiday Traditions running for the full season (day after Halloween to day after Christmas.)

- Holly – Holly is one of Sirius XM's annual month-long Christmas music channels that plays Christmas songs with an emphasis on up and coming singers. Its playlist changes from what one would find on an FM Adult Contemporary station at Christmas time to what one would find on a station aimed at tweens and teens. It previously aired on SiriusXM Love (2009–2014, since 2016) and Velvet (2015).
- Holiday Traditions – Holiday Traditions is not a traditional Christmas channel per se, but instead is narrowly focused on seasonal pop recordings from the 1940s to the 1960s.
- Holiday Pops – This holiday channel plays choral and orchestral music with a Christmas theme. It replaces Sirius XM Pops in December and is therefore presented in XM HD Surround. Formerly known as "Pops Holiday Classics" (2005) and "A Classical Christmas" (2006–07). In summer 2014 the Sirius XM Pops station was discontinued and Holiday Pops will air during a reduced period, only during Christmas Eve and Christmas Day (December 24/25 – before the Sirius XM pops station was cancelled it operated during the bulk of December.)
- Country Christmas – This channel features Christmas-themed country music. It previously aired on XM as "A Nashville Christmas" (2005) and "Music City Holiday" (2006–07).
- Radio Hanukkah – This channel was debuted in 2006 for the Hanukkah celebration. Radio Hanukkah features the best in Jewish music, comedy, Broadway, talk and kids programming. This was the first satellite radio channel dedicated exclusively to Jewish culture. Following the merger with Sirius, Radio Hanukkah produced almost exclusively Jewish music selections, foregoing the comedy, Broadway, talk, and kids programming.

The following seasonal channels also aired on XM in past years:

- Special XMas – From 2001 to 2007, this seasonal incarnation of the defunct Special X channel featured novelty holiday music, from songs by the likes of Alvin and the Chipmunks and Barney, to parody songs from Bob Rivers and Weird Al Yankovic, to the more grown-up xL tastes from punk rock bands. Special XMas also aired online and on DirecTV.
- Bing Crosby Christmas Radio – Airing in 2008 and 2009 and hosted by members of the Crosby family, this channel featured more than twenty years of vintage Crosby radio specials.

=== XM on AOL Radio ===
On 2008-04-30, the XM channels were no longer offered on AOL Radio, as AOL switched to CBS Radio for some of its content, thus ending a partnership between AOL and XM.

== On or after the Sirius and XM channel lineup merger ==
These actions took place on or after 2008-11-12, the merger of the SIRIUS and XM channel lineups.

=== Channel mergers ===
These channels were merged with their Sirius counterpart to reduce redundancies across the two channel lineups:

- America was replaced with The Roadhouse.
- US Country was replaced with Prime Country.
- The Heart was replaced with Sirius XM Love.
- Flight 26 was replaced with The Pulse.
- XM Hitlist was replaced with Pop2K.
- Spirit was replaced with Praise.
- Fred was replaced with 1st Wave.
- XM Café was replaced with The Spectrum.
- Top Tracks was replaced with Classic Vinyl.
- Ethel was replaced with Alt Nation.
- xL SquiZZ was replaced with Octane.
- XM Liquid Metal was replaced with Hard Attack, and then was renamed Liquid Metal .
- Big Tracks was replaced with Classic Rewind.
- Lucy was replaced with Lithium.
- Soul Street was replaced with Soul Town.
- Suite 62 was replaced with Heart & Soul.
- The City was replaced with Hip-Hop Nation.
- High Standards (formerly Frank's Place) was replaced with Siriusly Sinatra.
- Audio Visions was replaced with Spa.
- The Move was replaced with Area.
- XM Chill was replaced with Sirius XM Chill
- Vox was replaced with Metropolitan Opera Radio.
- XM Classics was replaced with Symphony Hall.
- XM Kids was replaced with Kids Place Live.
- XM Live was replaced with Specials.
- XM Comedy was replaced with Raw Dog Comedy.
- Take Five was replaced with Sirius XM Stars.
- XM Emergency Alert was replaced with Sirius XM Weather & Emergency.
- Open Road was replaced with Road Dog Trucking on 2009-02-17.
- America Right was replaced with SIRIUS XM Patriot on 2010-05-17.
- xL The Rhyme was replaced with BackSpin
- The Strobe was replaced with Studio 54 Radio
- The Roadhouse was replaced with Willie's Roadhouse
- Top 20 on 20 was replaced with Venus

=== Defunct channels ===
These channels are no longer included in the XM part of the Sirius XM Radio platform:

- BBC Radio 1 (XM29) – UK radio hits and chart hits, Removed from satellite delivery on 2011-08-10 for a new channel at 5:00 p.m., Studio 54 Radio.
- U-Pop (XM29) – Global Chart Hits and International Pop hits. Removed from satellite delivery on 2008-11-12 when the merger of the SIRIUS and XM channel lineups took place but continued on XM Online on XM31. Removed 2009-02-06 from XM Radio Online and DirecTV as 1worldspace prepared to cease operations resulting from its bankruptcy protection filing in October 2008.
- The System (XM82) – Various Electronic and Dance. Removed from satellite delivery on 2008-11-12 when the merger of the SIRIUS and XM channel lineups took place but continued on XM Online. Removed 2009-02-06 from XM Radio Online and DirecTV as 1worldspace prepared to cease operations resulting from its bankruptcy protection filing in October 2008.
- World Zone (XM90 Online) – World Music. Removed 2009-02-06 from XM Radio Online and DirecTV as 1worldspace prepared to cease operations resulting from its bankruptcy protection filing in October 2008.
- Ngoma (XM98 Online) – African Music. Removed 2009-02-06 from XM Radio Online and DirecTV as 1worldspace prepared to cease operations resulting from its bankruptcy protection filing in October 2008.
- Fox Business Network (XM136) – Business news. TV audio simulcast.
- National Lampoon Comedy Radio (XM154) – Comedy. Removed 2009-03-06 by Clear Channel.
- WLW 700 (XM173) – News/Talk, UC and XU football/basketball play-by-play. Removed 2009-03-06 by Clear Channel.
- XM Deportivo (XM 147) – (in Spanish) Sports Talk and Play-by-Play. Removed 2010-07-01 and was replaced by Sirius XM Fantasy Sports Radio.

== Micro-channels ==
These channels are specialty themed channels aired to coincide with an event, or devoted to a single personality or musical artist:

- Me-103 (XM 103) – In celebration of XM's 4 million subscribers, a contest was held for a listener to program his/her own channel for a day.
- FIFA World Cup 2006 (XM 148) – Was the home for English World Cup Soccer Commentary and Play-by-Play. Added on 3/24/06. This station left the day after the completion of the 2006 World Cup. (Removed on 7/10/06.)
- XM Green (XM 200) – Between 2007-03-16 and 2007-03-18, this channel featured Irish folk music in honor of Saint Patrick's Day on channel 200. In 2008, XM Green preempted Fine Tuning on channel 76 from 2008-03-15 to 2008-03-17. On 2009-03-17, the format (renamed Radio Ireland) aired on XM channel 15, temporarily preempting The Village. On 2010-03-17, the format (once again renamed, to St. Patty's Day Radio) preempts The Spectrum on XM channel 45.
- Play Ball! (XM 120) – A special program of baseball-themed songs and spoken-word bits, timed to coincide with Opening Day of the Major League season. Aired on channel 200 between 2007-03-30 and 2007-04-02, and on channel 120 between 2008-03-29 and 2008-03-30.
- Larry! (XM 130) – Between 2007-04-16 and 2007-05-04, channel 130 featured replays of The Larry King Show along with interviews and new material. Originally scheduled for 5 days starting on 2007-04-16 the broadcast was extended and replayed the CNN coverage of Larry King Live that was aired during that week.
- XM Summer (XM 120) – This channel, featuring a marathon of summer-themed songs, first aired on channel 120 between 2007-06-20 and 2007-06-22. It re-aired on 2008-06-21.
- Uncle Sam (XM 120) – This channel, featuring patriotic American music for the Fourth of July, aired on channel 120 between 2007-07-03 and 2007-07-05. It re-aired on 2008-07-04.
- Earth Sounds (XM 39) – Between 2007-07-07 and 2007-07-09, this channel featured nature sounds of the earth, airing on channel 39. The micro-channel was a part of XM's Live Earth coverage.
- Christmas In July (XM 120) – Between 2007-07-25 and 2007-07-26, this channel featured popular Christmas-themed music in the middle of summer. The channel aired on XM Live 120.
- Car-B-Q (XM 120) – Between 2007-09-01 and 2007-09-03, this channel featured a mix of songs about traveling and Car music aired on XM Live Channel 120.
- P.O.T.U.S `08 (XM 130) – Produced in conjunction with C-SPAN and covering the 2008 U.S. presidential election, this channel launched on 2007-09-24 and was originally intended to run only until the election on 2008-11-04. However, as part of the Sirius/XM channel lineup merger on 2008-11-12, P.O.T.U.S `08 was merged with Sirius' Indie Talk channel and rechristened as a permanent channel (P.O.T.U.S.) on both services.
- Igor (XM 120) – Between 2007-10-29 and 2007-11-01, this channel featured Halloween music and aired on XM Live Channel 120.
- Party City (XM 120) – Between 2007-12-26 and 2008-01-01, this channel featured a mix of music to bring in the New Year that aired on XM Live Channel 120. To ring in 2009, Party City was on Sirius channel 39 and XM channel 38 between 2008-12-30 and 2009-01-02.
- XM LED: The Led Zeppelin Channel (XM 59) – Between 2007-11-08 and 2008-03-08, this channel featured Led Zeppelin music 24/7 on channel 59. The channel, renamed Led Zeppelin Radio, re-aired on XM channel 39 and Sirius channel 12 from 2008-11-01 to 2008-12-31.
- XM THRILLER (XM 63) – Between 2008-03-01 and 2008-03-31, this channel featured Michael Jackson music 24/7 on channel 63, in conjunction with the 25th anniversary of Jackson's Thriller album.
- Strait Country (XM 17) – Between 2008-04-01 and 2008-05-31, this channel featured the music of country singer George Strait 24/7 on channel 17, temporarily pre-empting US Country.
- Papal U.S. Visit '08 (XM 120) – Produced in conjunction with EWTN Global Catholic Network, this channel covered Pope Benedict XVI's visit to the U.S. on channel 120 from 2008-04-15 to 2008-04-20.
- 30 Days of Coldplay (XM 51) – From 2008-07-15 to 2008-08-15, channel 51 played the music of Coldplay 24/7, along with interviews and exclusive live performances.
- Mandatory Metallica (XM 51) – From 2008-08-16 to 2008-09-30, channel 51 played the music of Metallica 24/7, along with interviews and exclusive live performances. It returned briefly from March 14 to April 13, 2009.
- AC/DC Radio (XM 53) – From 2008-09-15 to 2009-01-15, channel 53 played the music of AC/DC 24/7, along with interviews and exclusive live performances, temporarily preempting Fungus.
- World Series Radio (XM 55) – Essentially a retitled encore of the 'Play Ball!' microchannel (see above), 'World Series Radio' aired on 2008-10-26 to coincide with Game 4 of the 2008 World Series.
- Fireman Radio (XM 27 and SR 33) – From 2009-02-14 to 2009-03-13, this channel featured the music of Paul McCartney 24/7, along with exclusive interviews. Fireman Radio temporarily preempted The Bridge on XM channel 27 and Sirius channel 33.
- Dave Matthews Band Radio (XM 56 and SR 17) – From 2009-06-01 to 2009-06-08, this channel featured the music of rock band Dave Matthews Band 24/7, along with exclusive interviews. Dave Matthews Band Radio temporarily preempted Jam On on XM channel 56 and Sirius channel 17.
- The Woodstock Channel (XM 40 and SR 16) – From 2009-08-14 to 2009-08-16, this channel commemorated the 40th anniversary of the original Woodstock Festival, with live and studio performances from the festival's participating artists as well as interviewers with the cast and crew of the film Taking Woodstock. The Woodstock Channel temporarily preempted Deep Tracks on XM channel 40 and Sirius channel 16.

== See also ==
- List of Sirius XM Radio channels, current lineup
