= List of SiriusXM channels =

The following is a list of channels on both the American and Canadian versions of SiriusXM. It includes different music genres (ranging from Pop, Rock and Country to EDM and Latin music), news and politics, entertainment, and even live sports.

== Current channels ==
Updated as of 19 November 2026. The channel list may differ for the Canadian area, with most of the listed channels (mainly regional sports) were available only for United States.

Some channels, however, are marked with an [E], meaning it will play songs containing explicit language or mature programming that may be offensive to many listeners. Family-friendly plans are available to subscribe, altering most of the songs or providing programming for a clean station.

=== Seasonal holiday channels ===
Channels that relocate during holiday season includes: The Bridge (moved to #145 as #14 occupied by Jimmy Fallon Holiday Seasoning Radio) and '40s Junction (App only channel (#296) as #71 occupied by SiriusXM Holly)

Name	Format	Satellite	Internet	SiriusXM #
Jimmy Fallon Holiday Seasoning Radio	Curated Christmas songs by Jimmy Fallon	Holiday only	Holiday only	14 (November 2–December 28, 2026)
Acoustic Christmas	Acoustic Christmas performances	Holiday only	Holiday only	17 (Satellite only; December 24–26, 2026); 630 (App only; November 2–December 28, 2026)
Country Christmas	Country Christmas music	Holiday only	Holiday only	58 (temporary replaced Prime Country; December 2–December 28, 2026); 606 (App only; November 2–December 2, 2026 & December 28, 2026–January 7, 2027)
Holiday Pops	Classical Christmas performances	Holiday only	Holiday only	66 (Satellite only; December 24–26, 2026); 622 (App only; November 2–December 28, 2026)
Holiday Traditions	Traditional Christmas songs	Holiday only	Available	71 (November 2–December 28, 2026); 602 (App only)
Smokey's Holiday Soul Town	R&B Christmas songs by Smokey Robinson	Holiday only	Holiday only	74 (temporary replaced Smokey's Soul Town; December 2–December 28, 2026); 612 (App only; November 2–December 2, 2026)
Christmas Spirit	Contemporary Christian Christmas music	Holiday only	Holiday only	79 (temporary replaced Message Worship; December 2–December 28, 2026); 610 (App only; November 2–December 2, 2026 & December 28, 2026–January 7, 2027)
SiriusXM Holly	Contemporary Christmas hits	Holiday only	Holiday only	144 (November 2–December 28, 2026); 600 (App only; December 28, 2026–January 7, 2027)
New Year's Nation	Music from different genres for New Year's Day	Holiday only	Holiday only	144 (December 28, 2026–January 7, 2027)
Hallmark Channel Radio	Christmas songs and commentary from Hallmark Channel	Holiday only (Limited to select new vehicles [within U.S.])	Holiday only	300 (November 2–December 28, 2026)
Jolly Christmas	Upbeat, feel-good Christmas songs	Holiday only (Limited to select new vehicles [within U.S.])	Holiday only	608 (November 2–December 28, 2026)
Jingle Jamz	Christmas Hip-hop and R&B	Unavailable	Holiday only	614 (November 2–December 28, 2026)
Real Jazz Holiday	Contemporary and classic Christmas jazz	Unavailable	Holiday only	616 (November 2–December 28, 2026)
Cool Jazz Christmas	Smooth contemporary Christmas jazz	Unavailable	Holiday only	618 (November 2–December 28, 2026)
Mannheim Steamroller Channel	Christmas music from Mannheim Steamroller and a few of their originals	Unavailable	Holiday only	620 (November 2–December 28, 2026)
Trans-Siberian Orchestra Radio	Christmas music from Trans-Siberian Orchestra and a few of their originals	Unavailable	Holiday only	621 (November 2–December 28, 2026)
Holiday Instrumentals	Instrumental Christmas music	Unavailable	Holiday only	624 (November 2–December 28, 2026)
Navidad	Spanish Christmas songs	Holiday only (Limited to select new vehicles [within U.S.])	Holiday only	626 (November 2, 2026–January 7, 2027)
Rockin' Xmas	Christmas Rock/Alternative	Unavailable	Holiday only	628 (November 2–December 28, 2026)
Holiday Chill-out	Downtempo Christmas music	Unavailable	Holiday only	632 (November 2–December 28, 2026)
70s/80s Christmas	Christmas songs from the 70s and the 80s	Unavailable	Holiday only	634 (November 2–December 28, 2026)
Kids Christmas	Christmas songs for Kids	Unavailable	Holiday only	636 (November 2–December 28, 2026)
Sleep Christmas	Relaxing Christmas ambient	Unavailable	Holiday only	637 (November 2–December 28, 2026)
Radio Hanukkah	Hanukkah music and programming	Unavailable	Holiday only	638 (December 2–December 28, 2026)
Noël Incontournable	Francophone Christmas classics and contemporary holiday hits	Unavailable	Holiday only	640 (November 2–December 28, 2026)

=== Preview ===
Name	Format	Satellite	Internet	XM #	Sirius #
Sirius XM Preview	Sirius XM Promos and Information	Free	Available	1	184
Sirius XM 107	Sirius XM Promos and Information	Available	Available	107	

=== Pop ===
Name	Format	Satellite	Internet	SiriusXM #	Dish Network #
SiriusXM Hits 1	Contemporary hits	Available	Available	2	99.2
Unwell Music [E]	Nostalgic throwbacks and trending hits curated by Call Her Daddy host Alex Cooper	Available	Available	3	—N/a
Life with John Mayer	John Mayer's own music, including unreleased and live recordings, and his personally curated music from all genres	Available	Available	4	—N/a
The Pulse (formerly Flight 26)	Hot Adult Contemporary, modern adult Pop hits and Soul	Available	Available	5	99.15
PopRocks	90s to recent pop rock hits	Available	Available	6	—N/a
'70s on 7	Hits from the 1970s	Available	Available	7	99.7
'80s on 8	Hits from the 1980s	Available	Available	8	99.8
'90s on 9	Hits from the 1990s	Available	Available	9	99.9
Pop2K (formerly KISS and XM Hitlist)	Hits from the 2000s	Available	Available	10	99.10
The 10s Spot (Formerly KIIS-Los Angeles)	Hits from the 2010s	Available	Available	11	—N/a
Kelly Clarkson Connection	Kelly Clarkson's own music and music that she loves and inspires her	Available	Available	12	—N/a
Pitbull's Globalization	Global hits curated by Pitbull, and DJs from around the world	Available	Available	13	99.4
The Blend	Classic adult contemporary from the 70s to 80s	Available	Available	16	99.16
The Coffee House	Singer-songwriters; acoustic versions	Available	Available	17	99.14
'50s Gold (formerly '50s on 5)	Hits from the 50s	Available	Available	72	99.5
'60s Gold (formerly '60s on 6)	Hits from the 60s	Available	Available	73	99.6
Elvis Radio	Elvis Presley Music 24/7	Available	Available	76	99.19
Road Trip Radio	Music to drive to, 2010s and pop	Limited to select new vehicles (within U.S.)	Available	301	—N/a
Andy Cohen's Kiki Lounge	Mix of pop, rock, and dance	U.S. only	Available	302	—N/a
Mosaic	Modern Adult Contemporary Pop from the 90s to today	Limited to select new vehicles (within U.S.)	Available	305	—N/a
Pop Top 500 Countdown	Repeat loop of program featuring the 500 best pop songs of all time	Unavailable	App only	550	—N/a
80's on 8 Top 500 Countdown	Repeat loop of program featuring the 500 best pop songs of the 1980s	Unavailable	App only	551	—N/a
90's on 9 Top 500 Countdown	Repeat loop of program featuring the 500 best pop songs of the 1990s	Unavailable	App only	552	—N/a
Pandora Now [E] (formerly Top 20 on 20)	What's trending on Pandora	Unavailable	App only	703	—N/a
SiriusXM K-Pop [E]	K-pop hits by Korean idol groups	Unavailable	App only	705	—N/a
SiriusXM Love	Love songs and soft adult contemporary hits from the 60s through 80s	Unavailable	App only	708	—N/a
Sirius XO	Love songs and soft adult contemporary hits from the 90s to today	Unavailable	App only	709	—N/a

=== Rock ===
Name	Format	Satellite	Internet	SiriusXM #	Dish Network #
The Bridge	Mellow classic rock from the 70s and 80s	Available	Available	14	99.32
Yacht Rock Radio	Smooth-sailing soft rock from the 70s and 80s	Available	Available	15	—N/a
The Beatles Channel	The Beatles music, solo music from their members, covers and songs which influenced them; music from Apple Records	Available	Available	18	—N/a
Bob Marley's Tuff Gong Radio	Music from Bob Marley	Available	Available	19	—N/a
E Street Radio	Music from Bruce Springsteen and his E Street Band	Available	Available	20	99.20
Underground Garage	Garage rock curated by Little Steven	Available	Available	21	99.21
Pearl Jam Radio	Pearl Jam, 24/7	Available	Available	22	99.22
The Grateful Dead Channel	Music from the Grateful Dead	Available	Available	23	99.23
Radio Margaritaville	Jimmy Buffett and other music appealing to Parrotheads	Available	Available	24	99.24
Classic Rewind (formerly Big Tracks)	Classic rock from the late 70s and 80s	Available	Available	25	99.25
Classic Vinyl (formerly Top Tracks)	Album-oriented rock from the 60s and early 70s	Available	Available	26	99.26
Alt 2K	Alternative rock from the 2000s & 2010s	Available	Available	27	—N/a
The Spectrum (formerly XM's XM Café)	Adult album alternative	Available	Available	28	99.28
Phish Radio	Music from Phish	Available	Available	29	—N/a
Dave Matthews Band Radio	Music from Dave Matthews Band	Available	Available	30	—N/a
Tom Petty Radio	Music from Tom Petty	Available	Available	31	—N/a
U2 X-Radio	Music from U2	Available	Available	32	—N/a
1st Wave	Classic alternative rock	Available	Available	33	99.33
Lithium (formerly Lucy)	1990s alternative rock, grunge, and alternative metal	Available	Available	34	99.34
SiriusXMU (replaced from XM's XMU)	Indie and college rock	Available	Available	35	99.35
Alt Nation (replaced from XM's Lucy)	Modern alternative rock	Available	Available	36	99.36
Octane [E] (replaced from XM's xL SquiZZ)	Today's hard rock and alternative metal	Available	Available	37	99.37
Ozzy's Boneyard (formerly XM's xL Boneyard)	Classic hard rock and heavy metal curated by Ozzy Osbourne	Available	Available	38	99.38
Hair Nation (replaced from XM's Big Tracks)	Glam and hair metal from the 80s	Available	Available	39	99.39
Liquid Metal [E]	Today's extreme metal	Available	Available	40	99.40
SiriusXM Turbo [E]	Hard Rock and alternative metal from the 90s and 2000s	Available	Available	41	—N/a
Maximum Metallica [E]	Metallica music 24/7	Available	Available	42	—N/a
Deep Tracks	Deep classic rock, progressive rock, Album-oriented rock	Limited to select new vehicles	Available	308	—N/a
Jam on 309	Jam bands	Limited to select new vehicles (within U.S.)	Available	309	—N/a
Bon Jovi Radio	Hits and concerts from Bon Jovi along other selected groups	Limited to select new vehicles; U.S. only	Available	312	—N/a
Green Day's Idiot Nation [E] (formerly Faction Punk)	Punk rock; curated by Green Day	Limited to select new vehicles (within U.S.)	Available	314	99.41
Whole Lotta Red Hot	Music from Red Hot Chili Peppers	Limited to select new vehicles; U.S. only	Available	315	—N/a
Classic Rock Top 1000 Countdown	Repeat loop of program featuring the 1000 best classic rock songs	Unavailable	App only	553	—N/a
The Loft	Singers–Songwriters rock, soft rock and alternative rock	Unavailable	App only	710	—N/a
Tom Petty's Buried Treasure	Loop of archived radio show episodes	Unavailable	App only	711	—N/a
Rock Bar Radio	Rock & Roll Jukebox Songs	Unavailable	App only	713	—N/a
Classic Rock Party	Classic EDM–inspired rock and roll hits	Unavailable	App only	715	—N/a
Little Steven's Coolest Songs in the World	Garage Rock, curated by Little Steven of his Underground Garage radio	Unavailable	App only	721	—N/a

=== Urban & Caribbean ===
Name	Format	Satellite	Internet	SiriusXM #	Dish Network
Rock the Bells Radio [E] (replaced XM's xL The Rhyme, formerly Back Spin)	Golden age hip-hop, gangsta rap, 1980s–early 1990s "New school hip hop"	Available	Available	43	99.43
Hip-Hop Nation [E] (replaced XM's The City)	Modern hip-hop hits	Available	Available	44	99.44
Shade 45 [E] (replaced XM's xL 66 Raw)	Progressive hip-hop/rap music by Eminem	Available	Available	45	99.45
The Heat (replaced XM's The Eye formerly Hot Jamz)	Rhythmic Contemporary (Urban contemporary hip hop and R&B hits)	Available	Available	46	99.46
Heart & Soul (replaced XM's Suite 62)	Urban Adult Contemporary (Adult R&B hits)	Available	Available	47	99.48
The Flow	R&B hits from the 2000s	Available	Available	48	—N/a
Flex2K [E]	Hip hop hits from the 2000s	Available	Available	49	—N/a
SiriusXM FLY [E]	Hip hop and R&B hits from the 90s to 2000s	Available	Available	50	99.47
The Groove	1970s–early 90s old school R&B, funk, and disco	Available	Available	51	99.50
Smokey's Soul Town (formerly Soul Revue; replaced XM's Soul Street)	Classic soul and R&B curated by Smokey Robinson	Available	Available	74	—N/a
SiriusXM Silk 330	Smooth and sexy R&B love songs	Limited to select new vehicles (within U.S.)	Available	330	—N/a
Shaggy's Boombastic Radio (formerly The Joint)	Reggae and Afrobeats curated by Shaggy	Limited to select new vehicles (within U.S.)	Available	332	—N/a
Grown Folks JAMZ	Our true R&B experience	Limited to select new vehicles; U.S. only	Available	362	—N/a
Hip-hop Chronicles [E]	Iconic hip-hop tracks that everyone knows and loved	Unavailable	App only	556	—N/a
Sway's Universe [E]	Urban music and lifestyle	Unavailable	App only	720	—N/a
Rock the Bells Mixdown [E]	Hip-hop mixes	Unavailable	App only	723	—N/a
SoundCloud Radio [E]	Hip hop from up-and-coming artists from SoundCloud	Unavailable	App only	724	—N/a

=== Dance/Electronic ===
Name	Format	Satellite	Internet	SiriusXM #	Dish Network
BPM	Modern EDM hits	Available	Available	52	99.51
Diplo's Revolution [E] (formerly Electric Area and The Move)	EDM and occasional remixes by Diplo and his friends	Available	Available	53	99.52
Studio 54 Radio (formerly BBC Radio 1 simulcast, Chrome (XM), and The Strobe)	Classic house and disco bangers	Available	Available	54	99.54
Sirius XM Chill	Downtempo ambient house, chillwave, deep/tropical house	Available	Available	55	99.53
Radio Monaco	European dance and regular Pop hits	Limited to select new vehicles (within U.S.)	Available	340	—N/a
Utopia	Dance hits from the 1990s and 2000s	Limited to select new vehicles (within U.S.)	Available	341	—N/a
Steve Aoki Remix Radio	Remixes curated by Steve Aoki	Unavailable	App only	735	—N/a
A State of Armin	Trance and progressive house	Unavailable	App only	736	—N/a
Experts Only Radio [E]	EDM hits and live sets, curated by John Summit	Unavailable	App only	737	—N/a
One World Radio [E]	Curated music and live sets from Tomorrowland, one of the largest electronic dance music festivals held in Belgium	Unavailable	App only	738	—N/a

=== Country ===
Name	Format	Satellite	Internet	SiriusXM #	Dish Network
The Highway (formerly Highway 16)	Modern country music	Available	Available	56	99.56
Y2Kountry	Country music from the 2000s and 2010s (2000–2019)	Available	Available	57	—N/a
Prime Country (formerly U.S. Country)	Classic Country from the 1980s and 1990s	Available	Available	58	99.58
No Shoes Radio	Music from Kenny Chesney along with some easy country	Available	Available	59	—N/a
Carrie's Country	Music from Carrie Underwood, plus her favorite artists and influences, including classic rock and new country.	Available	Available	60	—N/a
Willie's Roadhouse (formerly The Roadhouse and Willie's Place)	Classic country and Willie Nelson's Texas Traditional Country from the 1960s, 1970s, and 1980s	Available	Available	61	99.59
Outlaw Country	Outlaw country, alternative country, Americana	Available	Available	62	99.60
Chris Stapleton Radio	Music from Chris Stapleton	Available	Available	63	99.63
Morgan Wallen Radio	Music from Morgan Wallen	Available	Available	64	—N/a
Bluegrass Junction	Bluegrass music	Available	Available	65	99.62
Dwight Yoakam & the Bakersfield Beat	Music from Dwight Yoakam	Limited to select new vehicles (within U.S.)	Available	349	—N/a
Red, White & Booze	Country bar songs	Limited to select new vehicles (within U.S.)	Available	350	—N/a
Country Top 1000 Countdown	Repeat loop of program featuring the 1000 best country songs of all time	Unavailable	App only	558	—N/a
Savior Sunday Daily by Carrie's Country	Country gospel curated by Carrie Underwood	Unavailable	App only	739	—N/a
Eric Church's Outsiders Radio	Music from Eric "The Chief" Church and his friends	Unavailable	App only	740	—N/a
The Village	Folk music	Unavailable	App only	741	—N/a

=== Christian ===
Name	Format	Satellite	Internet	SiriusXM #	Dish Network #
Kirk Franklin's Praise (formerly Spirit)	Gospel curated by Kirk Franklin	Available	Available	77	99.64
The Message	Contemporary Christian	Available	Available	78	99.65
Message Worship	Contemporary Worship	Available	Available	79	—N/a
Bill Gaither's enLighten	Southern Gospel	Available	Available	147	—N/a

=== Jazz, Standards & Classical ===
Name	Format	Satellite	Internet	SiriusXM #	Dish Network
Symphony Hall	Classical music	Available	Available	66	99.76
Real Jazz	Jazz	Available	Available	67	99.67
Watercolors	Smooth jazz	Available	Available	68	99.66
On Broadway	Showtunes	Available	Available	69	99.69
Siriusly Sinatra (formerly High Standards)	Standards, Jazz, and Swing	Available	Available	70	99.71
'40s Junction (formerly 40s on 4)	Big Band, Swing and Pop Hits from the 1940s	Available	Available	71	99.73
B.B. King's Bluesville	Blues	Available	Available	75	99.74
Escape	Beautiful music	Available	Available	146	99.69
Met Opera Radio	Opera from the Metropolitan Opera	Unavailable	App only	744	—N/a
Sirius XM Pops	Popular classical	Unavailable	App only	745	—N/a
Spa	New Age/Ambient Music	Unavailable	App only	746	99.68

=== Kids & Family ===
Name	Format	Satellite	Internet	SiriusXM #
Disney Hits	Songs from the Disney Songbook	Limited to select new vehicles (within U.S.)	Available	133
Kids Place Live	Children's music and live shows	Available	Available	134
Kidz Bop Radio	Today's pop songs covered by the Kidz Bop Kids	Available	Available	135
CoComelon & Friends	Children's music and shows from iconic Moonbug characters	Limited to select new vehicles (within U.S.)	Available	136
Disney Jr. Radio	Music and shows from Disney Jr.	Unavailable	App only	702

=== Sports ===
Additional sports play-by-play channels, in additions to the stations that may preempted (^), are available thru SiriusXM #192–238 and on the SiriusXM app.

Name	Format	Satellite	Internet	SiriusXM #
ESPN Radio	Sports talk	Available	Available	80
ESPN Xtra ^	Sports news	Available	Available	81
Mad Dog Sports Radio ^	Sports talk created and hosted by Chris "Mad Dog" Russo	Available	Available	82
Fox Sports on SiriusXM ^	Sports talk and play-by-play	Available	Available	83
SiriusXM College Sports Radio (formerly ESPNU Radio) ^	College sports talk and play-by-play	Available	Available	84
NBC Sports Audio ^	Sports talk and play-by-play	Available	Available	85
SiriusXM NBA Radio ^	National Basketball Association talk and play-by-play	Available	Available	86
SiriusXM Fantasy Sports Radio	Fantasy sports talk from FantasyGuru.com	Available	Available	87
SiriusXM NFL Radio ^	National Football League talk and play-by-play	Available	Available	88
MLB Network Radio ^	Major League Baseball talk and play-by-play	Available	Available	89
SiriusXM NASCAR Radio ^	NASCAR racing talk and play-by-play	Available	Available	90
SiriusXM NHL Network Radio ^	National Hockey League talk and play-by-play	Available	Available	91
SiriusXM PGA Tour Radio ^	PGA Tour golf talks and play-by-play	Available	Available	92
WWE Radio ^	WWE-focused pro wrestling talks and play-by-play	Available	Available	93
WFAN-AM/FM	New York City-based sports radio station	U.S. only	U.S. only	94
KSPN ESPN LA	ESPN-affiliated sports radio station based in Los Angeles, California	U.S. only	U.S. only	95
WSCR-AM/FM The Score	Sports radio station based in Chicago, Illinois	U.S. only	U.S. only	96
WEEI-FM	Sports radio station based in Boston, Massachusetts	U.S. only	U.S. only	97
94 WIP	Sports radio station based in Philadelphia, Pennsylvania	U.S. only	U.S. only	98
KRLD-FM The Fan	Sports radio station based in Dallas, Texas	U.S. only	U.S. only	99
KDKA The Fan	Sports radio station based in Pittsburgh, Pennsylvania	U.S. only	U.S. only	169
WXYT The Ticket	Sports radio station based in Detroit, Michigan	U.S. only	U.S. only	170
KGMZ The Game	Sports radio station based in San Francisco, California	U.S. only	U.S. only	171
WKRK The Fan	Sports radio station based in Cleveland, Ohio	U.S. only	U.S. only	172
KNX-FM The Fan	Sports radio station based in Los Angeles, California	U.S. only	U.S. only	174
WGR-AM/FM	Sports radio station based in Buffalo, New York	Unavailable	App only (U.S. only)	175
WZGC The Game	Sports radio station based in Atlanta, Georgia	Unavailable	App only (U.S. only)	176
WJZ-FM The Fan	Sports radio station based in Baltimore, Maryland	Unavailable	App only (U.S. only)	177
KIKK-AM/FM The Fan	Sports radio station based in Houston, Texas	Unavailable	App only (U.S. only)	178
KFNZ-AM/FM The Fan	Sports radio station based in Kansas City, Missouri	Unavailable	App only (U.S. only)	179
WMFS-AM/FM ESPN Memphis	ESPN-affiliated sports radio station based in Memphis, Tennessee	Unavailable	App only (U.S. only)	180
WQAM-AM/FM	Sports radio station based in Miami, Florida	Unavailable	App only (U.S. only)	181
WSSP The Fan	Sports radio station based in Milwaukee, Wisconsin	Unavailable	App only (U.S. only)	182
KRSK-AM/FM The Fan	Sports radio station based in Portland, Oregon	Unavailable	App only (U.S. only)	183
KIFM ESPN Sacramento	ESPN-affiliated sports radio station based in Sacramento, California	Unavailable	App only (U.S. only)	184
KWFN-FM The Fan	Sports radio station based in San Diego, California	Unavailable	App only (U.S. only)	185
WTEM The Team	Sports radio station based in Washington, D.C.	Unavailable	App only (U.S. only)	186
WJFK-FM The Fan	Sports radio station based in Washington, D.C.	Unavailable	App only (U.S. only)	187
SiriusXM FC ^	Soccer talks and play-by-play	U.S. only	Available	188
VSiN Radio ^	Sports betting talk from VSiN	Available	Available	189
SiriusXM INDYCAR Nation	IndyCar Series live coverage	Limited to select new vehicles (within U.S.)	Available	190
SiriusXM SEC Radio	Southeastern Conference talk and play-by-play	Limited to select new vehicles; U.S. only	Available	256
SiriusXM Big Ten Radio	Big Ten Conference talk and play-by-play	Limited to select new vehicles; U.S. only	Available	257
SiriusXM ACC Radio	Atlantic Coast Conference talk and play-by-play	Limited to select new vehicles; U.S. only	Available	258
ESPN Podcasts ^	Best of ESPN and 30 for 30 Podcast	Limited to select new vehicles; U.S. only	Available	259
Westwood One Sports (formerly CBS Sports Radio and Infinity Sports Network) ^	Sports talk	Limited to select new vehicles (within U.S.)	Available	260
F1 on SiriusXM	F1 race coverage and talks	Unavailable	App only	835
Outdoor Channel Radio	Outdoor sports talk and play-by-play	Unavailable	App only	836

=== Entertainment & Comedy ===
Name	Format	Satellite	Internet	SiriusXM #
Howard 100 [E]	Home of The Howard Stern Show	Available	Available	100
Radio Andy [E]	Andy Cohen's radio station for uncensored talk and gossips	Available	Available	101
Sebastian Maniscalco's Comedy Radio [E] (formerly Raw Comedy) ^	Uncensored comedy with Sebastian Maniscalco	Available	Available	102
Kevin Hart's Laugh Out Loud Radio [E]	Kevin Hart's comedy and shows	Available	Available	103
Conan O'Brien Radio [E] (formerly Team Coco Radio) ^	Home of Conan O'Brien and his Team Coco's talks and comedies	Available	Available	104
Netflix is a Joke Radio [E]	Uncensored Netflix comedy specials	Available	Available	105
Jeff & Larry's Comedy Roundup [E] (formerly Blue Collar Radio) ^	Uncensored comedy with Larry the Cable Guy and Jeff Foxworthy	Available	Available	106
Comedy Central Radio [E]	Uncensored comedy from Comedy Central	Available	Available	107
Comedy Greats [E] ^	Uncensored comedy featuring "the Greatest Comedians of All-Time"	Available	Available	108
Pure Comedy (formerly Laugh USA) ^	Family-friendly comedy	Available	Available	109
TODAY Show Radio ^	Today – live broadcast and extended show content	Available	Available	110
Dateline 24/7	All the crimes and mysteries from Dateline NBC	Available	Available	118
Faction Talk [E] ^	Unfiltered talk with Big Jay Oakerson, Sam Roberts, the Benningtons, and Eddie Trunk	Available	Available	137
Stars [E] ^	Hollywood lifestyle and conversation	Available	Available	138
Radio Classics ^	Old-time radio	Available	Available	140
20/20 True Crime	All the crimes and mysteries from 20/20	Available	Available	450
SiriusXM App Originals	SiriusXM Original podcasts and live performances	Unavailable	App only	770
Comedy in Full [E]	Comedy album plays	Unavailable	App only	773
Unwell On Air [E]	Unfiltered conversation, curated by Alex Cooper's Unwell Network	Unavailable	App only	786
SmartLess Radio [E]	SmartLess podcast 24/7	Unavailable	App only	787
Crime Junkie Radio	True crime podcast 24/7	Unavailable	App only	788
The Jeff Lewis Channel [E]	Loop of archived radio show episodes	Unavailable	App only	789
Entertainment Now	Pop culture recaps and specials	Unavailable	App only	790
Court TV (formerly Law & Crime)	Live trials (TV simulcast)	Unavailable	App only	793

=== News, Talk & Politics ===
Name	Format	Satellite	Internet	SiriusXM #
The Megyn Kelly Channel	Unfiltered political commentary and news by Megyn Kelly	Available	Available	111
CNBC	Financial news (TV simulcast)	Available	Available	112
Fox Business ^	Financial news (TV simulcast)	Available	Available	113
Fox News Channel	News and talks (TV simulcast)	Available	Available	114
Fox News Headlines 24/7	Headlines from Fox News	Available	Available	115
CNN	News and talks (TV simulcast)	Available	Available	116
MS NOW	News and talks (TV simulcast)	Available	Available	117
Doctor Radio	Health and medical information	Available	Available	119
BBC World Service (English North American feed)	News and talks	Available	Available	120
Bloomberg Radio ^	Simulcast of WBBR in New York City	Available	Available	121
NPR Now	NPR programs arranged specifically for SiriusXM	Available	Available	122
Triumph ^	Advice, enlightenment, and inspiration from Megyn Kelly, Dr. Laura, Dave Ramsey, Glenn Beck, Nancy Grace, etc.	Available	Available	123
P.O.T.U.S.	Political talk	Available	Available	124
SiriusXM Patriot ^	Conservative talk radio	Available	Available	125
SiriusXM Urban View ^	African-American talk	Available	Available	126
SiriusXM Progress ^	Progressive talk radio	Available	Available	127
Business Radio ^	Financial news & talk, operated by the Wharton School	Available	Available	132
PRX Remix	Public radio from PRX	U.S. only	Available	141
Road Dog Trucking ^	Trucking talk	Available	Available	142
Rural Radio ^	Agricultural news & western lifestyle	Available	Available	143
C-SPAN Radio ^	U.S. Government Hearings and Public Affairs (WCSP-FM radio simulcast)	Limited to select new vehicles (within U.S.)	Available	455
Freakonomics Radio Network	Socioeconomics podcast and others	Unavailable	App only	791
Ramsey Network	Business talk from Dave Ramsey	Unavailable	App only	792
ABC News Live	Live news reports (TV simulcast)	Unavailable	App only	796
NBC News NOW	Live news reports (TV simulcast)	Unavailable	App only	798
FOX Weather	Weather news reports (TV simulcast)	Unavailable	App only	799

=== Religion ===
Name	Format	Satellite	Internet	SiriusXM #
Joel Osteen Radio	Messages of Hope	Available	Available	128
The Catholic Channel ^	Talk For Saints and Sinners	Available	Available	129
EWTN Global Catholic Network	Solid Catholic Talk	Limited to select new vehicles (within U.S.)	Available	130
FamilyTalk	Christian Talk	Available	Available	131
The Billy Graham Channel ^	Messages from Billy Graham	Limited to select new vehicles (within U.S.)	Available	460

=== Others ===
Name	Format	Satellite	Internet	SiriusXM #
H.U.R. Voices	College Radio by Howard University (WHUR-FM)	U.S. only	Available	164
HBCU	College Radio from Howard University & HBCUs	U.S. only	Available	165
BYU Radio	Talk radio from Brigham Young University	U.S. only	Available	166
SLAM! Radio ^	Sports and entertainment talk from SLAM! Charter High School in Miami	U.S. only	Available	167
Holy Culture Radio	Christian hip hop and talk	U.S. only	Available	168

=== Latin (in Spanish language) ===
Name	Format	Satellite	Internet	SiriusXM #
Hits Uno [E]	Contemporary Latin hits	Limited to select new vehicles; U.S. only	Available	148
Caliente	Current Tropical/Latin Pop and Reggaeton	Available	Available	149
Águila	Regional Mexican Ranchera music	Limited to select new vehicles; U.S. only	Available	150
En Vivo	Live Latin music	Available	Available	151
Latin Vault	Classic Latin music from the 50s to the early 80s	Available	Available	152
Chucho Valdes' Cuba & Beyond	Cuban music	Unavailable	App only	760
Celia Cruz AZÚCAR!	Celebrating the legacy of Celia Cruz	Unavailable	App only	761
Caricia	Classic love ballads in both Spanish & English	Unavailable	App only	762
Viva	Today's Latin Pop hits	Unavailable	App only	763
Latidos	Latin Love songs	Unavailable	App only	764
Flow Nación	Latin Urban music	Unavailable	App only	765
Luna	Latin Jazz	Unavailable	App only	766
Rumbón	Classic Salsa music	Unavailable	App only	767
La Kueva	Latin rock	Unavailable	App only	768

=== French-language, Canadian, and international ===
Name	Format	Satellite	Internet	SiriusXM #
SiriusXM Comedy Club [E] ^	Uncensored comedy from Canadian Comedians	Available	Available	139
Mixtape: North [E]	Canadian Hip-hop and R&B	Available	Available	153
The Verge	Brand new and emerging Canadian Indie/Alternative music	Available	Available	154
Top of the Country Radio	New Canadian Country	Available	Available	155
Influence Franco	Canadian urban pop	Available	Available	156
Attitude Franco	French Rock music	Available	Available	157
Racines Musicales	Francophone & Canadian Country-Folk	Available	Available	158
The Indigiverse	Native Canadian music and talks	Canada only	Available	159
Canada Talks	Canadian current affairs & talk	Available	Available	160
CBC Radio One (special national feed)	Canadian news and information	Available	Available	161
Ici Radio-Canada Première	Canadian French news and information (simulcast of CBF-FM Montreal)	Available	Available	162
Korea Today Radio Network	Korean music, news, & entertainment	U.S. only	Available	163
SiriusXM Sports Schedule (SiriusXM Scoreboard in Canada)	Final sports scores and sporting information for Canadians	Available	Available	191
North Americana	Americana music	Limited to select new vehicles (within U.S.)	Available	359
Poplandia [E]	Canadian pop music & culture	Unavailable	App only	754
The Tragically Hip Radio	The Tragically Hip music, interview and their influences	Unavailable	App only	757
Iceberg Radio	Canadian Adult Alternative	Unavailable	App only	758
Les Tubes Franco	French Chart Hits (formerly Attitude Franco as pre-Rock music channel)	Unavailable	App only	759
SiriusXM Dhamaka	South Asian music	Unavailable	App only	769

== Former channels ==
These channels were part of SiriusXM, but are no longer active. It is unknown whether they will re-air online. (Most recent changes on top)

- SoulCycle Radio - Music programmed by SoulCycle
- Poplandia - Canadian pop music & culture
- Marky Ramone's Punk Rock Blitzkrieg
- TikTok Radio (launched 20 August 2021, discontinued on 20 November 2025 as the agreement between TikTok and SiriusXM expired. TikTok signed a new deal with competitor iHeartMedia to launch another iteration of the station, which launched on March 13, 2026, at 10 PM ET)
- Taylor's Channel 13 (dropped on 19 October 2025) — Played music from Taylor Swift, and similar artists that influenced her
- Avicii Radio — Played tribute music from Avicii, and other DJs
- Sound 42 by Drake - Played hip-hop music from Drake and other rappers
- SiriusXM Fight Nation (dropped on 1 July 2025; replaced with Pro Wrestling Nation 24/7)
- Miles Davis Radio - Played songs by Miles Davis
- Mental Health Radio - Played songs which discussed about mental illness
- Rock and Roll Hall of Fame Radio (dropped on 29 February 2024)
- Green Day Radio (107) - Played music from the band Green Day; dropped on 23 January 2024
- Venus 303 (formerly Top 20 on 20)
- SiriusXM 1st Traffic and Weather – Talked about continuous traffic and weather reports for major markets (channels cut January 2017; last channels dropped 1 March 2023)
- 88Rising Radio (305) – Asian pop hits that were curated by 88rising
- 102.7 KIIS-FM simulcast (dropped in May 2022) - Operated by iHeart
- Z100 in New York City simulcast (dropped in May 2022) - Operated by iHeart
- The Garth Channel (55) – Music of Garth Brooks and other artists (country and non-country) that he liked to enjoy (ran from 2016 to 2022)
- Happy Radio (708) (formerly StayHome Radio) - Played catchy hits for younger children
- Cinemagic (750) – Devoted to films that received nice scores; dropped on 7 December 2021
- ABBA Radio (54) – Limited-time station dedicated to ABBA that was available on satellite radio from 5 November, to 14 November 2021 and on the SiriusXM app until 14 December 2021.
- Radio Disney (79) – Music from Disney that was intended for preteens and teens (dropped on New Year's Eve 2020)
- Coldplay Radio (28) – Limited-time station for songs made by the British pop-rock band Coldplay (from 15 July, until 13 August 2020)
- BackSpin – "Old Skool" hip-hop and rap music
- TheBlaze Radio - Featured talk shows produced by TheBlaze; dropped on 5 April 2017
- Entertainment Weekly Radio – Featured pop culture news and reviews by modern-day journalists
- Classic College Radio – Played classic indie and rock
- Oprah Radio – Featured self-talk shows from Oprah Winfrey
- Top 20 on 20 – The pop music station whose song list was determined by listener voting; dropped on 17 July 2014
- World Radio Network – Originally "an international tour of news from broadcasting worldwide"; dropped on 25 April 2013
- Martha Stewart Living Radio – Variety station of programming different channels (dropped on 18 February 2013)
- Playboy Radio – Played uncensored adult music (dropped on 14 March 2013)
- Fox News Talk – Conservative talk radio that was operated by the Fox Broadcasting Company; dropped on 14 February 2013
- Radio Parallèle – A Franco-Canadian station started as Franc Parler (17 November 2005 – 16 April 2006), a men's-lifestyle program, then as SportPlus (17 April 2006 – 8 April 2007) including shock jock Jeff Fillion, then Radio Parralèle (9 April 2007 – 11 August 2011).
- BBC Radio 1 – Radio station that was operated by the British Broadcasting Corporation (BBC); dropped on 9 August 2011
- Specials – special events and shows; inherited format from XM Live, a channel that featured musical events, concerts, sports events, and weekly talk shows (dropped on 12 November 2008)
- New Country – Replaced by The Highway on 12 November 2008
- Rumbón (83) – Originally, a tropical/reggaeton radio station (replaced by Caliente on 12 November 2008); got revived on a different channel, prompting salsa music
- SIRIUS Disorder (33) – was a Freeform/Eclectic radio station (dropped on 12 November 2008)
- The System (82) – Various Electronic and Dance, primarily trance and synth-based. Dropped from satellite delivery on 12 November 2008, when the merger of the SIRIUS and XM channel lineups was implemented, but continued on XM Online. Removed 6 February 2009 from XM Online and DirecTV as 1worldspace, where the channel originated, prepared to cease operations, resulting from its bankruptcy protection filing in October 2008
- The Beat (36) – Was a Top 40/dance hit music station (got replaced by SiriusXM's BPM (SiriusXM) station beginning on 12 November 2008)
- Sirius Super Shuffle (12) – Adult contemporary hit music station (dropped from online service 12 November 2008)
- Laugh Break (105) – Dropped on 12 November 2008
- Universo Latino (90) – Was an Anglo-Latino (or Spanish-language) pop music radio station (dropped on 12 November 2008)
- Boombox (39) – Boombox was a breakbeat and old-school remix radio station on Sirius Satellite Radio channel 39 and DISH Network channel 6034 (dropped on 12 November 2008)
- Hot Jamz/The Eye (50/26) – Hip-Hop, Urban Contemporary, and R&B (replaced by XM's The Heat on 12 November 2008)
- E! Entertainment Radio (107) – Entertainment news and celebrity rumors (dropped on 12 November 2008)
- Punk (29) – Was a punk-rock/ska radio station. On 15 September 2008, it was replaced with a 24-hour AC/DC channel.
- Client 9 Radio (126) – Talk channel ran from 14 March 2008, at 5:00 pm ET through midnight on 17 March 2008, to discuss the Eliot Spitzer trial.
- LIME Radio (114) – Healthy Lifestyle (dropped on 13 February 2008).
- Court TV Plus (110) – Live trial proceedings (dropped on 1 January 2008); now broadcasts under the name "P.O.T.U.S."
- ABC News & Talk (143) – News/talk and entertainment from the ABC (dropped on 24 September 2007)
- Planet Jazz (70) – Modern Jazz and Contemporary Jazz music station (dropped on 7 September 2007)
- The Who Channel (29) – Music from the popular British rock band The Who (dropped on 1 April 2007)
- Discovery Channel Radio (119) – Known for airing Discovery Channel programming (dropped on 14 February 2007)
- Revolution (67) – Christian rock (dropped on 14 February 2007)
- Sports Byline USA (122) – Sports Talk and Play-by-Play (dropped on 14 February 2007)
- Rolling Stones Radio (98) – All songs performed by Rolling Stones (dropped on 1 January 2007)
- PRI (136) – Global Issues (dropped on 25 September 2006)
- BBC Mundo (182) – (in Spanish) News, (dropped on 25 September 2006)
- Classical Voices (85) – Opera, including classical orchestras (dropped on 25 September 2006)
- WSM Entertainment Radio (117) – Simulcast of 650 WSM in Nashville. Broadcast the Grand Ole Opry (dropped on 13 September 2006).
- Sirius RIGHT (145) – Some programming from this channel was merged into Sirius Patriot (dropped on 14 March 2006)
- Sirius Advice (117) – Advice programming. Upon deletion, programs were added to other Sirius channels (dropped on 14 March 2006).
- Mexicana (91) – Played regional music from Mexico; dropped on 14 March 2006
- EWTN Radio Catolica Mundial (180) – Spanish language Catholic programming; dropped on 14 March 2006
- Remix (62) – Played exclusive remixes of modern dance music; dropped on 29 September 2005
- Wax (42) – Featured hip-hop and classic UK garage music remixed by DJs; dropped on 29 September 2005
- Slow Jamz (52) – Played modern soft R&B and Soul ballads; dropped on 29 September 2005
- Swing Street (73) – Played swing-hop music from the decades: 1930s, 1940s, and 1950s; dropped on 29 September 2005
- Folk Town (38) – Played contemporary and traditional folk musicals; dropped on 29 September 2005
- Hispanic Talk (181) – Featured Spanish-language talk shows (now replaced by "ESPN Deportes" on 1 December 2005)
- The Weather Channel Radio (110–112) – Provided continuous weather forecasts; dropped on 29 September 2005
- Wisdom Radio (132) – Dedicated to new-age thinkers and life improvement methods; now rebranded as "Lime" on 29 September 2005
- The Word Network (161) – Featured Gospel music and some mini-series (based on AfrAm culture) from a Protestant/Christian and Gospel perspective; dropped on 29 September 2005
- Air America Radio (144) – Featured liberal talk radio, mainly hosted by Air America personalities. Dropped in July 2005 when Air America went exclusively with XM Satellite Radio.
- Vacation (97) – Played island vacation music—replaced with "Radio Margarita" in June 2005
- Talk for Women (Our Time) (131) – Featured women-oriented talk and entertainment programming (dropped in May 2005)
- Street Beat (44) – Featured rap and all-new hip-hop music (dropped in October 2004)
- La Red Hispana (117) – Featured news and talk programming in Spanish (replaced with "Hispanic Talk" in July 2004)
- Planet Dance (63) – Played mainstream dance music (replaced with "Area 63", then shortened to just "Area" in July 2004, then became Diplo's Revolution from 17 July 2015)
- Radio Deportivo (128) – Featured sports programming in the Spanish language; dropped in July 2004
- The Border (36) – Played alternative country (replaced with "Outlaw Country" on 28 April 2004)
- Country Road (32) – Played a mix of classic country and modern country (replaced with "Prime Country" since January 2004)
- House Party (60) – Played future house music; dropped in January 2004
- The Vortex (64) – Played trance music; dropped in January 2004
- Planet Rhyme (41) – Featured international hip-hop music; dropped in January 2004
- Vista (82) – Played chamber music; dropped in January 2004
- Soundscapes (98) – Played new age music; dropped in January 2004
- SIRIUS Sessions (100) – Played music featuring live concerts; dropped in January 2004
- Sirius Entertainment (135) – Featured programming about celebrities and the world of entertainment (replaced with "Our Time and Talk for Women" in January 2004
- A&E Satellite Radio (137) – Featured programming from the A&E network; dropped in January 2004
- Radio Amigo (140) – Spanish-language talk channel; dropped in January 2004
- Radio Mujer (141) – Another Spanish-language talk channel; dropped in January 2004
- The Express (44) – Old school/funky R&B music; dropped in February 2003
- 106.7 Lite FM (13) – Featured a simulcast of WLTW 106.7 Lite FM satellite radio in New York City; dropped in December 2003
- Special X – Played some legacy-based, novelty music; dropped from the Satellite feed and relegated to Web from around 2004, and was later dropped from SiriusXM after its real merger from 2008.

== See also ==
- XM Satellite Radio channel history
