= CineMagic =

CineMagic may refer to:

- CineMagic (film technique), the film development technique pioneered by Sidney W. Pink
- CineMagic (film festival), an international children's film festival in Belfast, Northern Ireland
- Cinemagic (Sirius XM), a soundtrack music channel on satellite radio
- CineMagic Co., a Japanese adult film production company
- Cinemagic (Dave Grusin album), 1987
- Cinemagic Theater, a movie theater located in Portland, Oregon

== See also ==
- Disney Cinemagic
