= SiriusXM Pops =

- Broadcast area: United States; Canada
- Frequency: SiriusXM Radio 745

Programming
- Format: Popular Classical

Ownership
- Owner: SiriusXM Radio

History
- First air date: September 25, 2001 (as XM Pops); November 12, 2008 (as SiriusXM Pops)
- Former names: XM Pops (September 25, 2001 – November 12, 2008); Sirius Pops (September 25, 2001 – November 12, 2008)
- Former frequencies: Sirius XM Radio 75 (May 4, 2011 – July 17, 2014)

Technical information
- Class: Satellite Radio Station

Links
- Website: SiriusXM Pops

SiriusXM Pops is a SiriusXM Satellite Radio online station devoted to popular classical music. It was formerly available on XM channel 75 (previously 77), Sirius channel 75 (previously 79). Until February 9, 2010, it was heard on Direct TV channel 866. Preston Trombly, Paul Bachmann, Vincent Caruso, Martin Goldsmith, Carol Ford and Lauren Rico were the channel's principal on-air voices.

The channel launched on XM in 2001 as XM Pops on channel 113. It moved to its channel number 77 and acquired its current name after merging with the SIRIUS Pops channel on November 12, 2008. It also acquired the same logo from its old Sirius counterpart. In addition, it is the only SiriusXM classical channel that was XM-exclusive until the channel merger. On Sirius Canada, the channel retains the Sirius Pops name.

On July 10, 2014, SiriusXM announced that SiriusXM Pops was to be removed from broadcast service on July 17. On July 17, 2014, at 12:00 a.m. Eastern, SiriusXM terminated broadcasting the SiriusXM Pops channel during a performance of Brahms' Hungarian Dance No. 5 just after playing Beethoven's Symphony No. 9 in D Minor. SiriusXM Pops programming has merged with Symphony Hall. However, SiriusXM Pops remains as an online-only station at channel 755.

== Holiday Pops ==
The channel was pre-empted each year for a "Holiday Pops" format featuring vocal and instrumental Christmas music. This format change generally ran from shortly after Thanksgiving weekend through Christmas Day. However, beginning in 2014 with the relegation of SiriusXM pops to an online only station, Holiday Pops was also relegated to an online-only channel except for a short period beginning December 24 through Christmas Day, where it preempts the regular Symphony Hall programming on Satellite service. Its new number is online channel 783 and usually airs from the first Monday in December until Christmas Day. Since 2014 it is now completely separate from SiriusXM Pops which also continues to air online during the full run of Holiday Pops. The regular Symphony Hall programming airs online only on Christmas Eve and Christmas Day when Holiday Pops takes its place on the satellite service.

In 2018, "Holiday Pops" aired online throughout the season starting in November.

== Pops On Film ==
Pops On Film was a specialty weekend program hosted and produced by Vincent Caruso. It aired Friday nights and was repeated Saturday nights and focused on film soundtrack and video game music suitable for a classical music and classical 'pops' music format. It ended when SiriusXM Pops was removed from broadcast service on July 17, 2014. The show was transitioned to SiriusXM's SymphonyHall (Channel 76) and renamed as "Classics On Film", with Vincent Caruso continuing to host and produce the show.

== See also ==
- List of Sirius Satellite Radio stations
- List of XM Satellite Radio channels
