= Area 38 =

Area 38 may refer to:

- Brodmann area 38, an area of the brain
- Electric Area, a music satellite channel
- Tuen Mun Area 38
