= Symphony Hall =

Symphony Hall may refer to:

== United States ==
- Atlanta Symphony Hall, Atlanta, Georgia
- Miller Symphony Hall, Allentown, Pennsylvania
- Symphony Hall, Boston, Boston, Massachusetts
- Newark Symphony Hall, Newark, New Jersey
- Phoenix Symphony Hall, Phoenix, Arizona
- Symphony Hall, Springfield, Springfield, Massachusetts

== Japan ==
- Muza Kawasaki Symphony Hall, Kawasaki, Kanagawa
- The Symphony Hall, Osaka
- Okayama Symphony Hall, Okayama

== Elsewhere ==
- Symphony Hall, Birmingham, Birmingham, England, UK

== Other uses ==
- Symphony Hall (Sirius XM), a classical music satellite radio channel

== See also ==
- Louise M. Davies Symphony Hall, San Francisco, California, US
- Concert hall
- List of concert halls
- Orchestra Hall (disambiguation)
