= Pop rock (disambiguation) =

Pop rock is a subgenre of pop music.

Pop rock may also refer to:

- Pop Rock (horse), a Japanese racehorse
- Pop Rocks, a carbonated candy
- PopRocks, a music channel that broadcasts on Sirius XM and Dish Network
- Pop Rocks (film), a 2004 film
- Pop Rocks (EP), an EP by Head Automatica
- "Pop Rock", a song by Brooke Candy from the EP Opulence
- Pop & Rock (magazine)
