= The 10s Spot =

Sirius XM Radio music channel

- Broadcast area: United States; Canada
- Frequency: Sirius XM Radio 11

Programming
- Format: 2010s hits

Ownership
- Owner: Sirius XM Radio
- Sister stations: Flex2K & The Flow (which are 2 radio stations that play 2010s hits. Flex2K plays Hip-Hop Hits and The Flow plays R&B Hits)

History
- First air date: November 3, 2021

Technical information
- Class: Satellite radio station

Links
- Website: https://www.siriusxm.com/channels/the-10s-spot

The 10s Spot is a satellite radio music channel that plays music from the 2010s. Originally launched on November 3, 2021, it airs on Sirius XM Radio Channel 11. The station plays pop, R&B, and hip hop songs from January 1, 2010 to December 31, 2019, and is commercial-free with the exception of station IDs, which primarily reference memes and pop culture references from the decade. For example The Weeknd's Blinding Lights was a huge #1 hit in 2020 but was released in November 29, 2019.

== History ==
In December 2023, it was announced that will.i.am will be hosting a radio show called "The FYI Show" with an AI co-host named "qd.pi" (pronounced “Cutie Pie”). The show has a strong focus on artificial intelligence technology, but also discusses other topics such as pop culture and music.

== Selected artists played ==
- Taylor Swift
- Drake
- Fall Out Boy
- Lady Gaga
- Justin Timberlake
- Adele
- Coldplay
- Rihanna
- Fetty Wap
- Bruno Mars
- Selena Gomez
- Beyonce
- Justin Bieber
- Ed Sheeran
- Katy Perry
- Halsey
- DJ Khaled
- P!nk
- The Weeknd
- Post Malone
- Kelly Clarkson
- Meghan Trainor
- Miley Cyrus
- Nicki Minaj
- Ariana Grande
- Shawn Mendes
- Maroon 5
- Calvin Harris
- Sia
- Charlie Puth
- Ke$ha
- Demi Lovato

== See also ==
- List of Sirius XM Radio channels
