= Evolution (radio show) =

Evolution is a weekly radio show hosted by Markus Schulz on the Sirius XM Radio network. The show began in June 2008 and features two 1 hour continuous mixes. Evolution originally aired exclusively on Sirius Satellite Radio channel Area 38. However, since the merger between Sirius and XM Satellite Radio was finalised, listeners can also find Evolution on XM channel 80.

== Broadcasts ==
Evolution is broadcast each Thursday at 8 p.m. Eastern, on Area.

Area is available on Sirus channel 38 and XM channel 80.
