= Spa (SiriusXM) =

Sirius XM satellite radio channel

- Broadcast area: United States, Canada
- Frequencies: Sirius XM Radio 746; DISH Network 6068

Programming
- Format: New-age music

Ownership
- Owner: Sirius XM Radio

History
- Former frequencies: Sirius XM Radio 68

Technical information
- Class: Satellite Radio Station

Links
- Website: www.siriusxm.com/channels/spa

Spa, formerly Spa 73, is a new-age, ambient and instrumental music channel on SiriusXM channel 746 (previously on channels 68 & 73 on Sirius and previously XM channel 72, where it replaced Audio Visions, which was XM 77) and on DISH Network channel 6068. Until February 9, 2010, it was on DirecTV channel 856.

During the 2011 Holiday Season (Tuesday 12/20/11 at 3 am ET until Thursday 12/29/11 at 3 am ET), Spa was replaced by Radio Hanukkah.

== Core artists ==
Recording Artists with at least 15 tracks in rotation on Spa:

- Peter Kater
- Steven Halpern
- Tangerine Dream
- Will Ackerman
- David Arkenstone
- Kitaro
- Nicholas Gunn
- Kevin Keller

Other notable artists:

- Brian Eno
- Paul Winter
- Mark Isham
- Enya

== See also ==
- List of Sirius Satellite Radio stations
