= SiriusXMU =

Sirius XM satellite radio channel

- Broadcast area: United States; Canada
- Frequencies: Sirius XM Radio 35; Dish Network 6035

Programming
- Format: Indie

Ownership
- Owner: Sirius XM Holdings

History
- First air date: September 2001

Technical information
- Class: Satellite radio

Links
- Website: SiriusXM: SiriusXMU

SiriusXMU (formerly XMU, and known as Sirius U on Sirius Canada, although Sirius receivers list it as Sirius XM U) is an indie pop, indie rock, unsigned artist music channel on XM Satellite Radio channel 35 (previously 43).

On November 12, 2008, it was added to Sirius 26 (replacing the Left of Center channel), moving to Sirius 35 on May 4, 2011, and Dish Network channel 6026. Until February 9, 2010, it was on DirecTV channel 831. The XM DJs were replaced with Sirius DJs, and acquired its current name, even though the channel is still listed as X043-FM by Mediabase. Sirius XM describes the channel as "North America's Indie Rock Station" and primarily airs artists who are signed to independent labels. The channel frequently plays songs from an artist's full album instead of just the singles. The Wall Street Journal has described XMU as "XM's alternative-music channel".

From July 15 to July 25 of 2020, XMU temporarily became the Beastie Boys Channel as one of many limited-run stations devoted to a specific artist.

== Featured shows ==
- Complete Control (formally called Blog Radio) (BrooklynVegan, Gorilla vs. Bear, Aquarium Drunkard, The Yellow Button)
- SiriusXMU Download 15
- SiriusXMU Sessions (formerly "Left of Sessions" prior to the Sirius/XM merger and was on the former channel Left of Center)
- SiriusXMU Old School Show
- Saturday Night Dive

== DJs ==
=== Active DJs ===
- Josiah Lambert
- Jenny Eliscu
- JaRon
- Nick Masi
- Justin Gage
- Chris Cantalini
- Kelsie
- Sarah Bazzy

=== Former DJs ===
- The station once featured DJ's Billy Zero and Tobi. Both were released from XM upon the launch of the merged Sirius-XM lineup.
- Christopher the Minister left Sirius on November 14, 2008, after six and a half years as a DJ on (formerly) Left of Center and Alt Nation.
- Jake Fogelnest left Sirius in November, 2014, to pursue a TV writing career.
- Julia Cunningham left the channel on October 30, 2020, after 13 years and moved to PopRocks.
- Lauren Sauer
- Phoebe Bridgers

== Core artists ==
- Tame Impala
- LCD Soundsystem
- Phoebe Bridgers
- Yeah Yeah Yeahs
- Radiohead
- Beach House
- Fleet Foxes
- Clairo
- Perfume Genius
- The Decemberists
- Arctic Monkeys
- MGMT
- Bon Iver
- The National
- The Strokes
- Sufjan Stevens
- Cults
- TV on the radio
- the xx
