= Clay Cane =

American journalist

- Born: United States
- Education: Rutgers University
- Occupations: Journalist, author, television personality
- Writing career
- Notable works: Burn Down Master's House: A Novel, The Grift: The Downward Spiral of Black Republicans From the Party of Lincoln to the Cult of Trump, Live Through This: Surviving the Intersections of Sexuality, God, and Race, Holler If You Hear Me: Black and Gay in the Church
- Notable awards: New York Festivals Radio 2022 Awards, GMAD's 2016 James Baldwin Revolutionary Award
- Website: clay-cane.com

Clay Cane is a journalist, author, political commentator, and radio host. He is the author of The Grift: The Downward Spiral of Black Republicans From the Party of Lincoln to the Cult of Trump (2024) and Burn Down Master's House: A Novel. Cane is also the host of The Clay Cane Show on SiriusXM Urban View channel 126.

== Early life and education ==
Clay grew up in both Washington State and Philadelphia, Pennsylvania, following his parent's divorce. He recalls facing significant racism in Washington State, but feeling much safer in Philadelphia as a Black individual. At age 14, he moved to Philadelphia, where he lived with his father and faced pressure to conform to traditional masculinity. In a personal account published in the Advocate, Cane describes being shaped by his father’s mental abuse, in which his father would “snap”’ to stop Cane’s "effeminate movement or sound,” leaving Cane anxious, introverted and afraid. Despite these experiences, his parents’ love of reading and his grandfather’s stories about their family’s history of enslavement helped spark his interest in Black history and writing. Cane later earned a bachelor's degree in English and African-American Studies from Rutgers University. He was also a member of academic honor society Phi Beta Kappa.

== Career ==
Cane is the co-editor and contributing writer of the 2012 anthology For Colored Boys Who Have Considered Suicide When the Rainbow is Still Not Enough: Coming of Age, Coming Out, and Coming Home. He also contributed to Where Did Our Love Go: Love and Relationships in the African-American Community.

In 2015, Cane created, directed and produced the BET.com original documentary Holler If You Hear Me: Black and Gay in the Church. The film explored homophobia in the black church by tackling the intersections of race, gender, sexuality and religion, earning a 2016 GLAAD Media Award nomination for Outstanding Digital Journalism.

Cane's commentary has been heard on MTV, ABC, FOX, VH1, CNN, and MSNBC. On February 24, 2016, The White House featured Cane as a Black History Month speaker along with a screening of the documentary. In 2017, he released Live Through This: Surviving the Intersections of Sexuality, God, and Race. In 2024, he released the New York Times bestseller The Grift: The Downward Spiral of Black Republicans From the Party of Lincoln to the Cult of Trump. In 2026, he released the New York Times bestselling novel Burn Down Master's House.

== Published works ==
- Cane, Clay (January 27, 2026). Burn Down Master's House: A Novel. Dafina. ISBN 978-1496759146.
- Cane, Clay (January 30, 2024). The Grift: The Downward Spiral of Black Republicans From the Party of Lincoln to the Cult of Trump. Sourcebooks, Incorporated. ISBN 978-1728290225.
- Cane, Clay (June 13, 2017). Live Through This: Surviving the Intersections of Sexuality, God, and Race. Start Publishing LLC. ISBN 978-1627782180.
- Boykin, Keith (2012). For Colored Boys Who Have Considered Suicide When the Rainbow is Still Not Enough: Coming of Age, Coming Out, and Coming Home. Magnus Books. ISBN 978-1936833153.
- Robertson, Gil l. IV (2013). Where Did Our Love Go: Love and Relationships in the African-American Community. Agate. ISBN 978-1932841701.
