= Orchestra Hall =

Orchestra Hall may refer to:

- Orchestra Hall, part of Symphony Center in Chicago
- Orchestra Hall (Detroit, Michigan)
- Orchestra Hall (Minneapolis, Minnesota)

== See also ==
- Symphony Hall (disambiguation)
