= FantasyGuru.com =

- Website type: Fantasy football
- Owner: Jeff Mans
- Creator: John Hansen
- Website: www.fantasyguru.com
- Commercial: Yes
- Registration: Required
- Launched: 1995; 31 years ago
- Current status: Active

FantasyGuru.com, launched in 1995, is a subscription-based fantasy football website. The company, which originated as a newsletter published by owner John Hansen, entered its 17th year in business in 2011. Specializing in the National Football League, the site provides projections, statistical analysis, player rankings, and other tools for subscribers. The site's staff also produces regular podcasts and is active in social networking, with accounts on Facebook and Twitter.

== History ==
Hansen started the Guru Report Newsletter as a side project in 1995, and continued mailing and faxing hardcopies until 1997. In 1998, Hansen turned the publication into a website and eventually an annual magazine, opting for online-only content with the discontinuation of the magazine in 2009. Additionally, in 2006, Hansen began publishing a syndicated column for King Features.

Starting in 2003 and continuing today, FantasyGuru.com regularly produces content for Yahoo's fantasy section. They are particularly focused on a fantasy player’s range of outcomes.

== Radio ==
In 2004, Hansen and FoxSports.com’s Adam Caplan began hosting SiriusXM Fantasy Football, which aired Friday nights during the NFL season on Sirius NFL Radio.

The success of the show prompted SiriusXM to create SiriusXM Fantasy Sports Radio, giving FantasyGuru.com a seven-day-a-week program during the NFL season, including senior writers Matt Camp and Joe Dolan picking up a weekend edition of the program. SiriusXM vice president of sports Steve Cohen said the fantasy show's success on Sirius NFL Radio helped to lay the groundwork for the channel and convinced the company "to keep building on" the fantasy platform.

With the channel, Hansen and his staff have participated in multiple expert drafts. Additionally, Hansen has participated in celebrity drafts and, in 2010, Hansen hosted Ashton Kutcher's celebrity draft auction live from Las Vegas.

The Elite Sports show on SiriusXM Fantasy Sports Radio is hosted by Jeff Mans who took over as operator of Fantasy Guru for John Hansen.

== Television ==
Hansen was among the first fantasy writers to publish content for ESPN.com when the site was in its infancy, and he parlayed that experience into appearing on-camera in projects with NFL.com, NFL Network, DirecTV, and the Comcast SportsNet television show Fantasy Fix.

== Staff ==
- Jeff Mans, Chief Content Officer
- Rob Brink, MLB Guru
- Ray Flowers, Lead Analyst
- Armando Marsal, Lead Analyst
- Russell Clay, Lead Analyst
- Tyler Buecher, Lead Analyst
- Ted Schuster, Lead Analyst
- Mike Horn, NFL Analyst
- Rob Povia, Managing Editor
- Chris Rose, MLB/NBA/NFL Analyst
- Scott Bondar, MLB/CFB/NFL Analyst
- Justin "Fensty" Fensterman, NBA/NFL Analyst
- Phil Backert, MLB/NFL/IDP Specialist
- Ryan Clifford, NHL Analyst
- Jorge Pucks, NHL/NFL/CFS Analyst
- Rich Maletto, NFL/NASCAR Analyst
- Nick Rodriquez, NHL Analyst
- Bill Reinhard, NFL Analyst
- Slappy White, Horse Racing Analyst
- Sean Engle, NASCAR Analyst/Producer
- Mike "The Beard" Cillo, CFL/NFL/NBA Analyst
- Tyler Rodrigue, MMA/PGA Analyst
- Surge Singh, NFL/PGA/MMA Analyst
- Ani Sridhar, Soccer Analyst
- Mark Hogan, NFL/UFL Analyst
- "Patio" Joe Baldino, MLB/NFL Analyst
