= Joe Madison =

American radio program host (1949–2024)

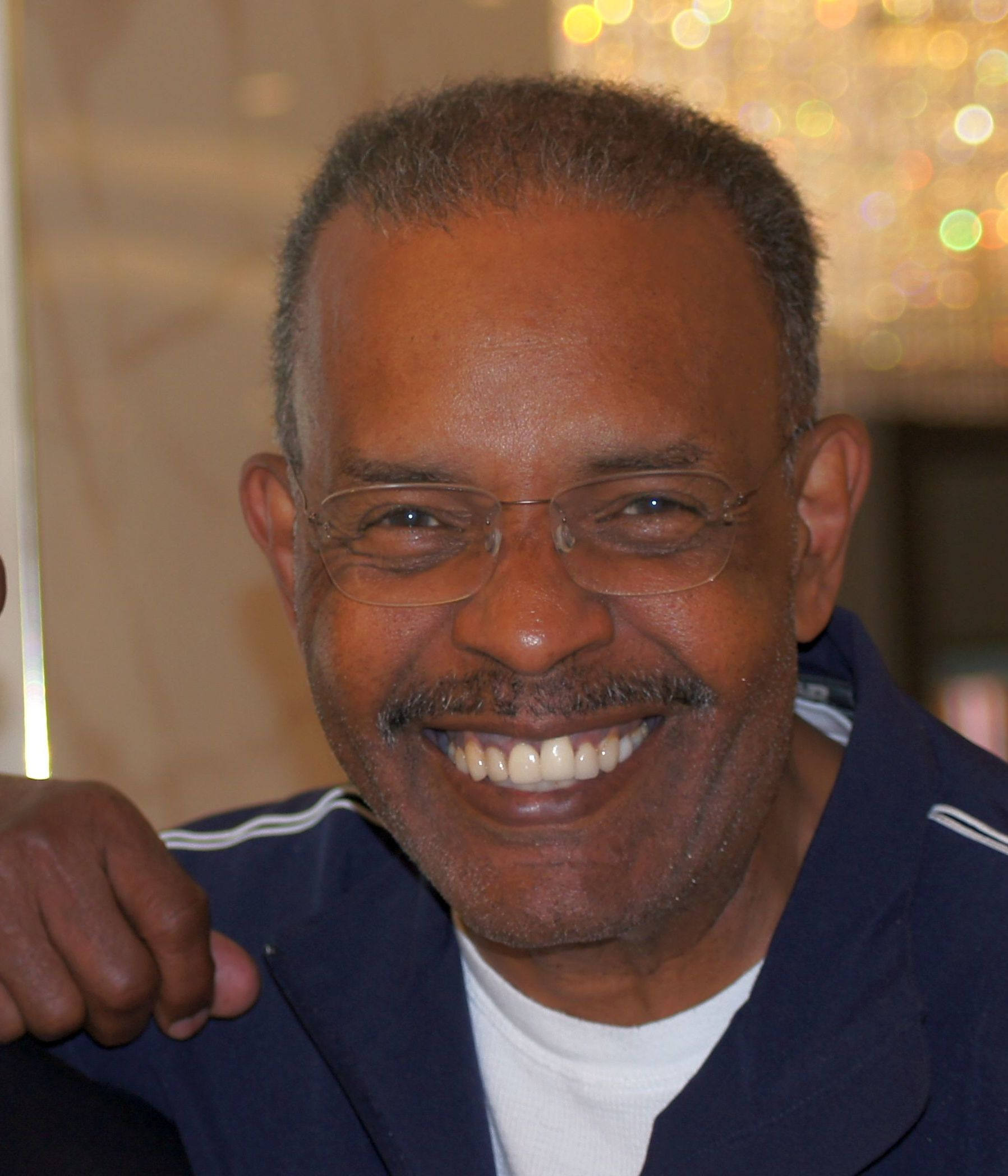
- Madison in 2019
- Born: Joseph Edward Madison; June 16, 1949; Dayton, Ohio, U.S.
- Died: January 31, 2024 (aged 74); Washington, D.C., U.S.
- Education: Washington University, B.A., 1971 (sociology)
- Occupations: Talk show host, commentator
- Organization: Member of Phi Beta Sigma fraternity
- Board member of: National Association for the Advancement of Colored People, 1986–~1999; Operation Big Vote, 1978-?; American Red Cross, 2013-
- Spouse: Sherry (m. in or before 1978)
- Children: 4
- Parent(s): Nancy Stone and Felix Madison, Herman Haygood (biological)
- Awards: Freedom of Speech Award, Talkers Magazine, April 2008; Americans Noteworthy Community Leaders, Jaycees, 1976-78; Man of the Year, Black American Women's Hall of Fame, 1980; Men to Watch in the 1980's, Detroit Monthly Magazine; Nation's 50 Leaders of the Future, Ebony Magazine; Top Ten Newsmaker, Crain's Detroit Business; Achievement in Radio Award for Best Non-Drive Time Radio Show; Best Spot News Bdcast; finalist, Best New Talent Award; honorary Kentucky colonel
- Website: JoeMadison.com

Joseph Madison (June 16, 1949 – January 31, 2024) was an American Talk radio host and activist heard on the SiriusXM show Urban View. He advocated on voting rights, genocide, anti-lynching and other issues, seeking to mobilize his listeners. He served on the National Board of Directors of the NAACP. He was also known as "The Black Eagle". He was a member of the National Radio Hall of Fame.

== Early life and education ==
Madison was a native of Dayton, Ohio and graduated from Roosevelt High School in 1967. He graduated from Washington University in St. Louis in 1971 with a degree in sociology, and also played football for their team. His alma mater also awarded him a WashU Arts & Sciences' Distinguished Alumni Award in 2017 and an Honorary Doctor of Laws degree in 2019. After his death, his hometown of Dayton gave an honorary designation of "Joe Madison Way" to Cowart Avenue, the street he grew up on.

== Radio career ==
Madison began his radio career in 1980 on the AM band at Detroit's WXYZ-AM radio station. Later he hosted at 96.5 WWDB-FM Philadelphia.

In the early 1990s, he joined an otherwise white lineup at WWRC-AM, where he developed a crossover appeal handling issues that included race but were aimed at the station's multiracial audience. He left in 1998, after the station fired its talent and changed format, to start an online chat show. That summer he moved to Radio One’s 1450 WOL-AM as Program Director and afternoon host.

The popularity of his program led to syndication on the Radio One Talk Network and its XM satellite channel, which merged with Sirius to become SiriusXM in 2008. He left WOL in 2013 after more than a decade and moved exclusively to SiriusXM. There he started hosting mornings on their 'Urban View' channel. Later he moved to Mondays through Fridays from 6 am to 10 am.

In 2013 Madison moved exclusively to SiriusXM to host mornings on their 'Urban View' channel. He was heard Mondays through Fridays from 6 am to 10 am on 'Urban View' channel 126, SiriusXM.

In June 2015 he broadcast live from Cuba. SiriusXM described the broadcast as the first such American radio broadcast from the island in more than 50 years.

He became known as "The Black Eagle". He was inducted into the National Radio Hall of Fame in 2019.

He used his radio programs to promote legislation and mobilize listeners. He challenged his listeners to take action on the issues he covered and became known for asking the question; "What are you going to do about it?".

== NAACP ==
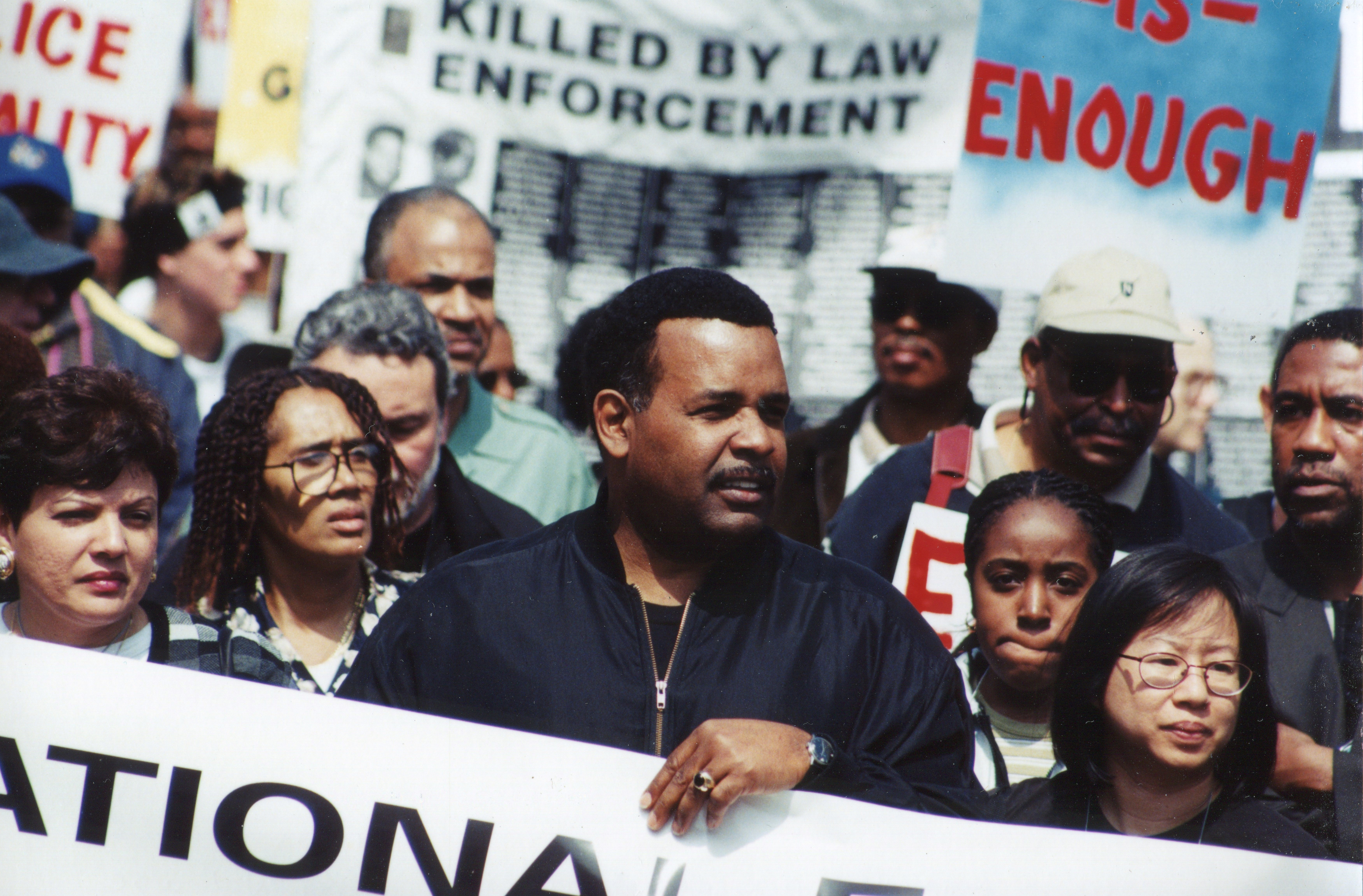
Madison at a protest against police brutality in 1999

Madison worked with the NAACP as the youngest Executive Director of the NAACP's Detroit branch at age 24. He was appointed the organization's National Political Director in 1974 and served until 1978. In 1986 he was elected to the National Board of Directors and served until 1999.

== Humanitarian work ==
Following Hurricane Katrina in 2005, he took his radio program on the road through the Gulf Coast to document conditions and draw attention to the needs of affected communities. He also traveled to Haiti following the 2010 Haiti earthquake and assisted relief workers.

On February 25–27, 2015, he hosted a record breaking marathon when he talked for 52 hours on his SiriusXM talk show. The broadcast is officially registered with the Guinness World Records. The broadcast raised more than $250,000 for the National Museum of African American History and Culture..

== March for dignity ==
During his NAACP career, Madison organized voter registration efforts. One of the most notable mobilization efforts was the cross-country "March for Dignity" in which hundreds of volunteers took part from Los Angeles to Baltimore. These marches collected thousands of signatures in support of an anti-apartheid bill in Congress.

== Allegations of CIA drug trafficking ==
He publicized allegations of CIA complicity in trafficking cocaine into the United States. He sought evidence of the complicity and promoted legislation to declassify related documents. On October 15, 1996, Madison, Dick Gregory, and John Newman launched a hunger strike to support this legislation.

== Sudan ==
In the 1990s and early 2000s, Madison campaigned against slavery and genocide in Sudan. He participated in demonstrations outside the Sudanese Embassy in Washington and was repeatedly arrested during acts of civil disobedience. The demonstrations protested the Sudanese government's conduct in the civil war and the enslavement of people captured from southern Sudan. In 2004, he was arrested with former representative Walter Fauntroy outside the Sudanese Embassy in Washington, D.C.

Madison traveled to Sudan six times during the Second Sudanese Civil War to deliver survival kits to refugees. He talked about the enslaved in Sudan on his show and participated in the freeing of over 7,000 people held in slavery according to his biography.

He used his radio program to raise awareness of the Sudanese conflict and to encourage political action to end the war. He called for sanctions and divestment from Sudan.

== Anti-lynching legislation ==
Beginning in 2018, Madison campaigned for federal legislation to make lynching a federal crime. He repeatedly raised the issue on his SiriusXM program and pressed members of Congress to support the legislation. Although the legislation did not become law initially, Madison's persistent advocacy on the airwaves played a crucial role in making sure Congress passed the Emmett Till Antilynching Act. President Joe Biden signed the legislation into law on March 29, 2022. His advocacy for the legislation was publicly acknowledged by congressional leaders, including then-Speaker of the House Nancy Pelosi.

== Voting rights ==
In November 2021, Madison began a hunger strike to pressure Congress to pass federal voting rights legislation, including the Freedom to Vote Act and the John Lewis Voting Rights Advancement Act. He ended the strike after 73 days in January 2022 after the Senate failed to advance the legislation. During the hunger strike he lost weight and he later said that the experience caused significant weakness and insomnia. During the 2021–22 hunger strike, he was undergoing treatment for prostate cancer, a fact that he did not share with his listeners at the time.

== Finding your roots ==
Madison appeared on Henry Louis Gates, Jr.'s PBS television show, Finding Your Roots, in 2019. He took a DNA test indicating he has ancestry in Sierra Leone and Mozambique. Research done for the show revealed that his great-grandfather was a white man from South Carolina who fought for the Confederates during the American Civil War; and his biological grandfather was included in the Tuskegee syphilis experiment.

== Personal life ==
Madison lived in Washington, D.C., with his wife Sharon (Sherry) and was a father and grandfather. He died of prostate cancer at his home in Washington, D.C. on January 31, 2024, at the age of 74.
