= Cinemagic Theater =

Theater in Portland, Oregon, U.S.

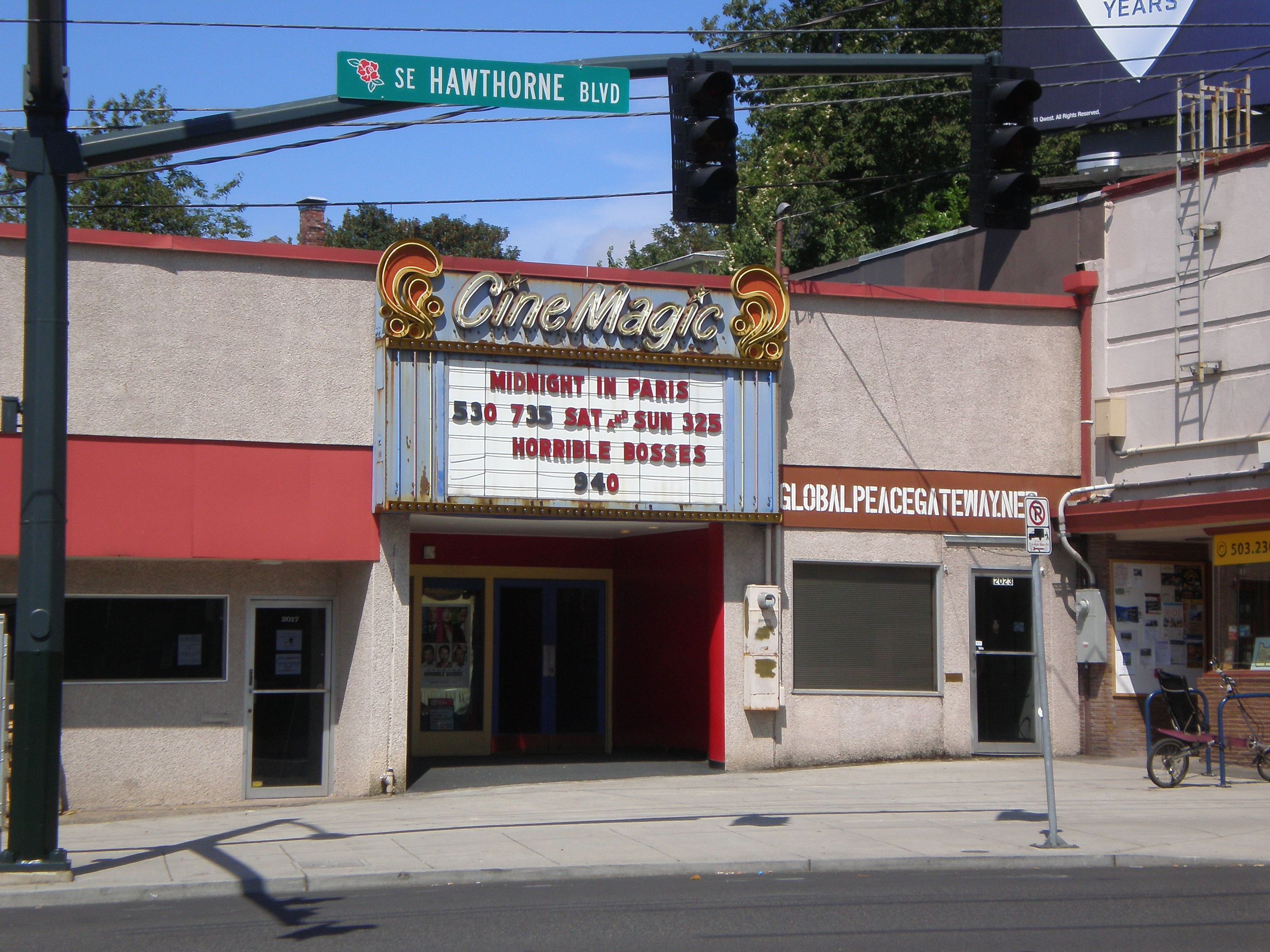
- The building's exterior in 2011
- Interactive map of Cinemagic Theater
- Address: 2021 Southeast Hawthorne Boulevard; Portland, Oregon; United States
- Coordinates: 45°30′44.5″N 122°38′42.5″W

Website
- thecinemagictheater.com

Cinemagic Theater is a theater in Portland, Oregon.

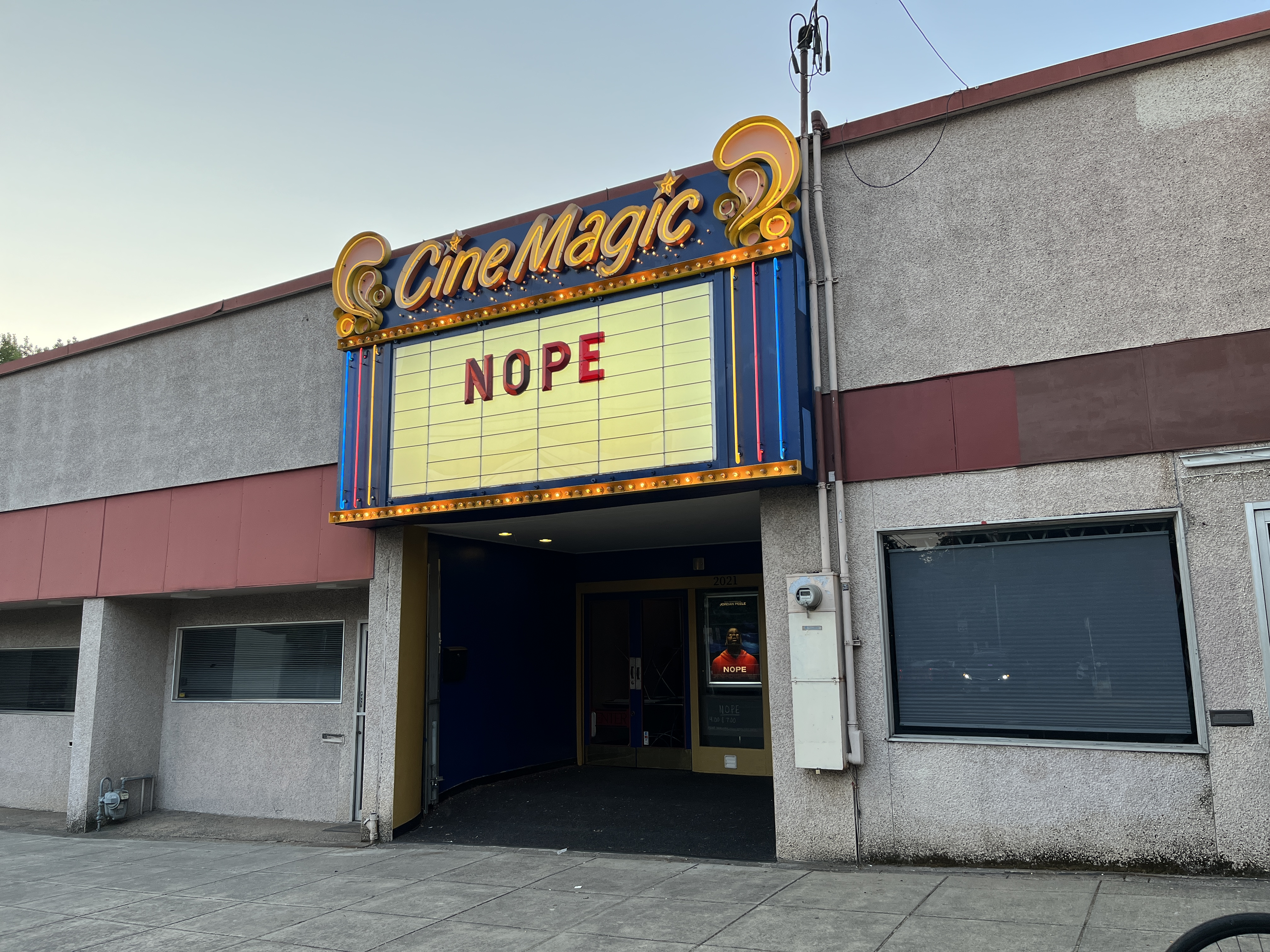
Exterior, 2022

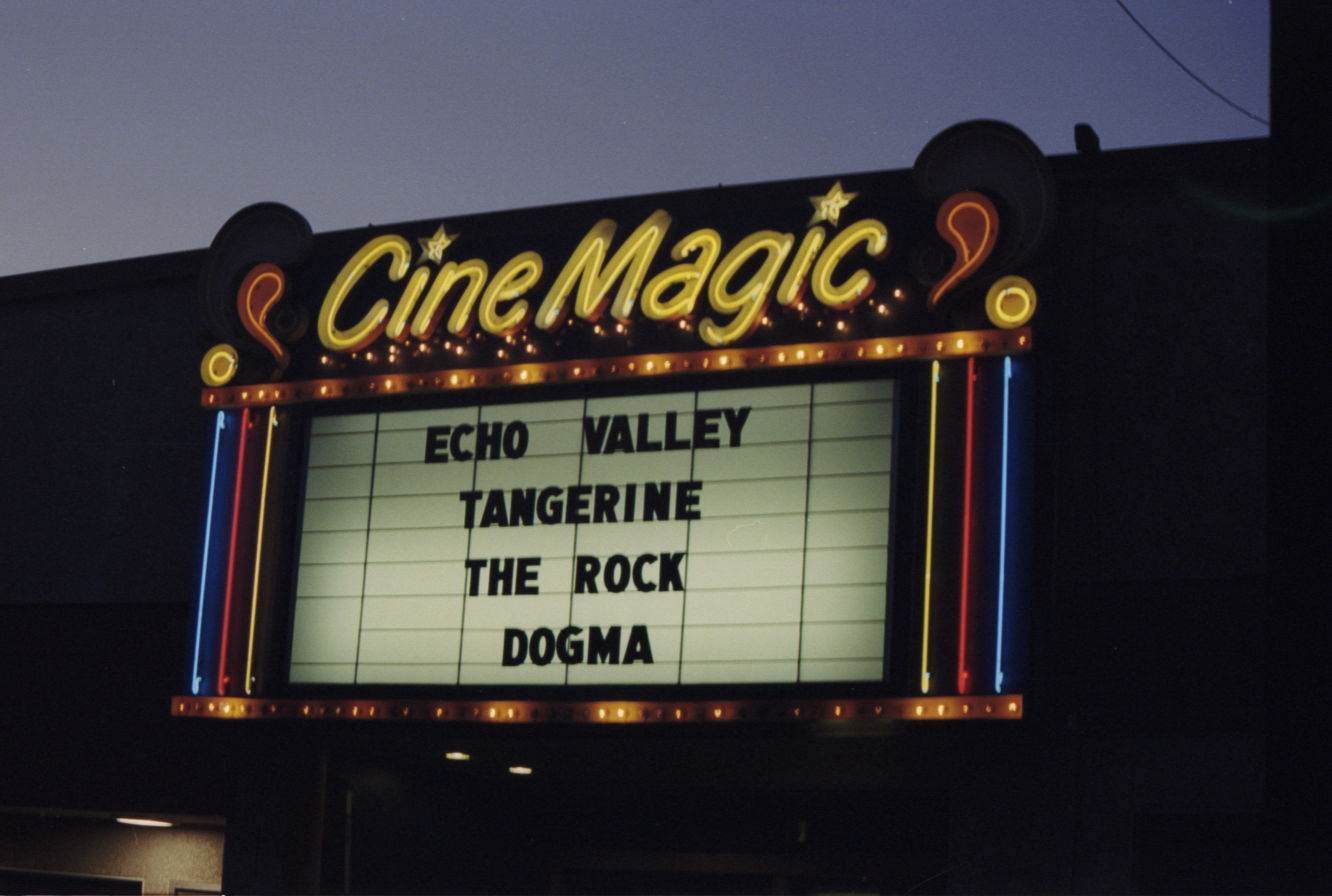
The marquee on June 17, 2025
