= Diplo's Revolution =

- Broadcast area: United States; Canada
- Frequencies: Sirius XM Radio 53; Dish Network 6052

Programming
- Format: Electronic dance music

Ownership
- Owner: Sirius XM Radio

History
- Former names: The Move (2002-2008); Electric Area (2008-2018)

Technical information
- Class: Satellite radio station

Links
- Website: SiriusXM: Diplo's Revolution

Diplo's Revolution is a global-centric electronic dance music satellite channel operated by Sirius XM Radio, broadcasting on Sirius Satellite Radio channel 53, XM Satellite Radio channel 53 and Dish Network channel 6052.

The channel was formerly known as Electric Area (2008–2018) and before that Area (2002–2008 via Sirius) and its XM Radio counterpart The Move (2001–2008). The channel is being programmed by musician/producer/DJ/remixer Diplo and named after his 2013 song "Revolution." The channel made its debut at 9 pm (EDT) on March 22, 2018.

== Station history ==
=== As "Area"/"Electric Area" ===
The station was available on Sirius, and at first was called Area 63 due to the channel's position. Later, it was renamed Area 33, again due to the channel's then-new position. Area features some of the world's most renowned DJs such as Tiësto, Armin van Buuren, Dash Berlin, Carl Cox, Erik Morillo, Paul Van Dyk, Benny Benassi, Armand Van Helden, Roger Sanchez, Ferry Corsten, Thomas Gold, Serge Devant, Deep Dish, Annie Mac, Sasha and John Digweed. On June 24, 2008, Area 33 was moved to channel 38 to make room for the move of SIRIUS Disorder (occupying the position is now The Bridge). On November 12, 2008, Area dropped its "38" position on the logo because of the Sirius-XM merger, and replaced The Move on the XM channel lineup. Most recently, Mediabase delisted the S038-FM channel's playlist, along with co-owned Pop2K; Mediabase would read the station to its Dance panel in January 2014.

On September 12, 2010, the channel was renamed Electric Area to expand its exclusive dance music format.

=== As "Diplo's Revolution" ===
On March 22, 2018, Electric Area was replaced with "Diplo's Revolution". It was announced at the launch that the channel would feature "global, hip-hop, experimental and underground dance culture" aside from the current dance/electronica direction, as well as live sets and live festival broadcasts. The transition also resulted in sister channel BPM incorporating most of the content into its playlist.

As of 2020, Diplo’s Revolution has begun to follow a more Top 40-like approach similar to sister channel BPM, as reflected in its playlists as reported in Billboard’s Dance/Mix Show Airplay and Mediabase’s Dance charts.

== Programming ==
- All Love From NY with DJ Theo
- Area with Jonathan Peters
- Automatic Static with DJ Icey
- The Benny Benassi Show
- Call of The Wild with Monstercat
- DJ Times Shortlist with Emily Tan
- Evolution
- Global DJ Broadcast with Markus Schulz
- The Flavor The Vibe with StoneBridge
- Feel Up Radio with Kream
- Groove Radio International with Swedish Egil
- Identity with Sander Van Doorn
- Jefr Tale presents Club Tales
- Jacked with Afrojack
- The Juicy Show with Robbie Rivera
- LostWorld with George Acosta
- Made In Miami with Oscar G
- The Mothership with Skrillex
- Nocturnal with Matt Darey
- Paul Van Dyk's Vonyc Sessions
- Steve Porter's Porterhouse
- Subterranean with Zoltar
- The Cookout
- Group Therapy Radio with Above & Beyond
- Claude VonStroke presents The Birdhouse
- Transitions with John Digweed
- IsEveryoneOK with Phantoms
- UMF Radio
- Wonderland Radio with Alison Wonderland
- Playground Radio with Louis the Child
- A State Of Trance with Armin van Buuren, also airs on digital channel 736 ("A State of Armin").
- Night Service Only Radio with CID

== Former Programming ==
- Major Behavior with The Fat Jewish: Internet star Josh Ostrovsky hosted this weekly show where he interviewed celebrities, invited co-hosts, and played guest mixes. The show aired twice a week from May to September 2018.
- Hardwell On Air with Hardwell moved to BPM.
- Tiësto's Club Life: Moved to BPM once Tiesto shortened the show from 2 hours to 1 hour.
- Carl Cox: Global: Carl Cox ended the show in 2017.
- Corsten's Countdown with Ferry Corsten: Ended the show in 2020

== Availability ==
As Electric Area, it was carried on DirecTV until February 9, 2010. On May 5, 2011, it was moved to channel 52 for both services and Dish Network 6052. Diplo's Revolution currently resides on SiriusXM channel 53.

== Former Logos ==
Logo as Area 38. 33 replaced the 38 position prior to June 24, 2008

Logo as Electric Area, used from 2010 to 2018

== Core artists ==
- Diplo
- DJ Snake
- Chris Lake
- AlunaGeorge
- Major Lazer
- MK
- Skrillex
- Dillon Francis

== See also ==
- List of Sirius Satellite Radio stations
- List of XM Satellite Radio channels
