= Martin Goldsmith (radio host) =

American radio personality and an author (born 1952)

Martin Julian Goldsmith (born August 18, 1952) is an American radio personality and an author, best known as a classical music host in the 1980s and 1990s on National Public Radio and, for 25 years, on SiriusXM (a post from which he retired in 2026), and for the book The Inextinguishable Symphony, about his parents' experiences as Jewish musicians in Nazi Germany.

== Biography ==
Born in St. Louis, Missouri, Goldsmith is the son of Gunther Goldschmidt, a flutist from Oldenburg, Germany, and Rosemarie Gumpert Goldschmidt, a violist. After emigrating to the United States, his mother was for 21 years a member of the St. Louis Symphony Orchestra. Goldsmith received a bachelor's degree from Johns Hopkins.

From 1971 to 1975 he was a radio host, musical producer, and writer at classical radio station WCLV, in Cleveland, Ohio. He joined WETA-FM, Washington, D.C., in 1975, serving as producer, announcer, music director, and, eventually, program director. In 1987 he joined National Public Radio as a music producer for Performance Today. From 1989 to 1999 he hosted that program; he became its senior commentator in 1999. He then moved to XM Satellite Radio, where for 25 years he served as director of classical music programming and an on-air host on Sirius XM's Symphony Hall channel, retiring in May 2026.

Goldsmith has sung in the chorus of the Baltimore Opera Company and made a guest appearance with the Washington Opera. He has also acted in many roles in Washington-area theaters, including Arena Stage. He plays the French horn. His music reviews have appeared in The Washington Post.

== Books ==
External media

Audio
- Martin Goldsmith, United States Holocaust Memorial Museum, December 4, 2008

Video
- Booknotes interview with Goldsmith on The Inextinguishable Symphony, January 7, 2001, C-SPAN
- Presentation by Goldsmith about Alex's Wake at the Library of Congress, May 19, 2014, C-SPAN

- The Inextinguishable Symphony: A True Story of Music and Love in Nazi Germany, John Wiley & Sons, 2001, ISBN 9781630262129. The nonfiction book details his parents' experiences in the Jüdischer Kulturbund, an all-Jewish orchestra maintained by the Nazis between 1933 and 1941.
- The Beatles Come to America, Wiley, 2004, ISBN 9780471469643.
- Alex's Wake: A Voyage of Betrayal and a Journey of Remembrance. Da Capo Press, Incorporated. 8 April 2014. ISBN 978-0-306-82322-0. Goldsmith tells his family's stories of the Holocaust.

== Film ==
- Winter journey (Winterreise), a 2019 documentary with feature film elements starring Bruno Ganz by Danish director Anders Østergaard. The film is based on Goldsmiths' book The Inextinguishable Symphony. Goldsmith narrates.

== Awards ==
Goldsmith's awards include Yale's Cultural Leadership Citation (1998) and, for Performance Today, a George Foster Peabody Award (1998).
