= PopRocks =

- Broadcast area: United States; Canada
- Frequencies: Sirius XM Radio 6 Dish Network 6017

Programming
- Format: Pop rock

Ownership
- Owner: Sirius XM Radio

History
- First air date: August 17, 2017
- Former frequencies: Sirius XM 17 (2017–2020) Sirius XM 12 (2020-2023)

Technical information
- Class: Satellite radio station

Links
- Website: siriusxm.com/channels/poprocks

PopRocks is a satellite radio music channel that plays pop rock music from the 1990s, 2000s, and 2010s. It airs on Sirius XM Radio (channel 6) and Dish Network.

== History ==
PopRocks debuted on August 17, 2017, as a full-time channel devoted to the pop-rock genre of music from the 1990s, 2000s, and 2010s.

On June 18, 2020, PopRocks moved from channel 17 to channel 12, replacing WHTZ (Z100). The Bridge took over PopRocks' former slot.

On November 8, 2023 PopRocks moved from channel 12 to channel 6.

== Content ==
The show is currently hosted by Karen Carson, Kat Corbett, and Julia Cunningham.

A selection of artists from the 1990s and 2000s are played by the channel including: The Killers, Coldplay, Sheryl Crow, Goo Goo Dolls, Train, No Doubt and Matchbox 20.

== See also ==
- List of Sirius XM Radio channels
