= Preston Trombly =

American musician and broadcast personality

Preston Andrew Trombly (born December 30, 1945, in Hartford, Connecticut) is an American musician and broadcast personality. He was a program host on SiriusXM's Symphony Hall classical music channel from 2000 to May 15, 2026.

Trombly earned his Bachelor of Music from the University of Connecticut in 1969. He received a Master of Musical Arts degree from the Yale School of Music in 1972. He has been a Fellow in Composition and Conducting at the Tanglewood Music Center (1970), a Guggenheim Fellow (1974–1975), and a resident fellow at the MacDowell Colony. Trombly's visual art has been shown in multiple exhibitions, principally in the New York area.

In the early 1980s Trombly was active as a saxophonist and jazz clarinetist. He played with the Jaki Byard group, and also as a soloist. He has taught at Vassar College, CUNY and the Catholic University of America.

Trombly was a classical music program host at WNCN-FM from 1991 to 1993, and at WQXR-FM from 1991 to 2000. He was also a newscaster and staff announcer at WOR-AM from 1991 to 2008. He joined Sirius Satellite Radio in 2000.

In 1997 Trombly married Margaret Mary Kelly, then the director of the Forbes Magazine Collection.
