= SiriusXM College Sports Radio =

- Broadcast area: United States; Canada
- Frequency: SiriusXM 84

Programming
- Format: Sports Talk and Play-by-Play
- Affiliations: College Football Playoff

Ownership
- Owner: Sirius XM Radio

History
- First air date: August 28, 2006

Technical information
- Class: Satellite Radio Station

Links
- Website: SiriusXM College Sports Radio

SiriusXM College Sports Radio is a channel on Sirius XM Radio focused on collegiate sports talk and play by play broadcasts.

The channel assumed its current form in 2010, mainly as a result of a merging of Sirius Sports Central and XM Sports Nation, and a couple programming changes with sister channel Mad Dog Radio.

Sirius XM College Sports Radio has a 24-hour available channel on Sirius XM Radio on channel 84 and includes original programs Tim Brando Show, College Football Playbook, Basketball and Beyond with Coach K, College Sports Coast to Coast, and others.

== History ==
=== Sporting News Radio (2001–2006) ===
Before XMSN, channel 143 was a complete simulcast of Sporting News Radio, a United States–based national sports radio network, of which XM had an exclusivity contract with. It was complemented on XM by its competitors, the long running ESPN Radio (channel 140), controlled by Hearst Corporation and Disney, and the recently formed Fox Sports Radio (channel 142), controlled by Premiere Radio Networks. The three sports networks remained in co-existence on the XM platform for several years. In 2005, the exclusivity contract with XM expired, and the satrad company renewed it under non-exclusivity, which allows XM competitor Sirius Satellite Radio to pick up the network as well. With the arrival of the PGA Tour Network, channel 143 ended up being pre-empted on the weekends due to bandwidth considerations. It was assumed that the channel was one of the platform's lower performers because of this, as no other third party sports networks on XM were being pre-empted. Despite negative feedback from fans, this practice did not stop until the channel underwent a renovation.

=== XM Sports Nation (2006–2010) ===

On August 28, 2006, Sporting News Radio became XM Sports Nation, and featured several new shows exclusive to XM. XM had already used the XM Sports Nation name to brand their sportscasts, often ending the games with a soundbyte saying "This has been a presentation of XM Sports Nation". New programs included XMSN This Morning, Power Shift, Rotowire Fantasy Football Hour, and College Football Coast to Coast. XMSN also acted as a replay channel for select NASCAR Radio shows, and became the new home of XM Live's weekly show, 60/20 Sports. To accommodate these shows, the Sporting News Radio lineup was carved up selectively. Some shows survived the transition, while others were truncated, or bounced from the platform completely. As of the change to XM Sports Nation, weekends were no longer pre-empted for the PGA Tour Network, and the channel became available on XM Canada.

=== XM143 to XM144, NASCAR Radio merger, and beyond ===
On January 1, 2007, XMSN moved to XM 144 from XM 143. Programming from XM's NASCAR Radio channel was merged into XM Sports Nation, including Claire B. Lang's afternoon show, both Jimmie Johnson and Dale Earnhardt Jr.'s live half-hour shows, and Joe Castello and Thommy Noodlez remained on Powershift from 8 to 10 pm ET. XMSN also added the Andretti-Green Racing Hour in March 2007, as part of expanded Indy Racing League coverage. More content from Sporting News Radio was sacrificed to make these changes, which included more replays of XMSN originals. As of February 2007, the only weekday host from Sporting News Radio that continue to air on XMSN is Tony Bruno show.

In addition, XMSN began airing Tony Kornheiser's radio show, which broadcasts from WTWP, on March 5, 2007. In August 2007, XMSN added Barry Switzer as a part of the channel's expanded college sports coverage. On January 21, 2008, XMSN added The Dan Patrick Show to its lineup as well as return Kornheiser to the lineup.

Only one week into "The New XM Sports Nation," Sporting News Radio announced that Tony Bruno was going to be cut from the network lineup. Technically, Bruno's last show was on January 18, and was followed up by a week of fill-ins, but it wasn't announced that it would be his last broadcast.

On July 14, 2008, XMSN was added to XM Radio Online.

=== Sirius XM College Sports Nation (2010–2017) ===
Sirius XM College Sports Nation launched in 2010 and talks college sports year round. It airs both college football and college basketball as well as shows related to college sports throughout the year.

=== ESPNU Radio (2017–2023) ===

On August 31, 2017, as part of a renewal of ESPN's programming agreements with Sirius XM, College Sports Nation was re-launched as ESPNU Radio—a radio counterpart to the ESPNU television service. It continues to carry college sports programming, but now sourced from ESPN Radio, ESPN's college sports studio programming on television, and podcasts.

=== SiriusXM College Sports Radio (since 2023) ===
On February 3, 2023, SiriusXM rebranded ESPNU Radio as SiriusXM College Sports Radio; while retaining most of its previous content, a simulcast of ESPN's College GameDay would move to ESPN Xtra.
