= CineMagic (SiriusXM) =

Cinemagic
- Broadcast area: United States; Canada
- Frequency: Sirius XM Radio 750
- Branding: CineMagic, Cinemagic

Programming
- Format: Movie Soundtracks

Ownership
- Owner: Sirius XM Radio

Technical information
- Class: Former: Satellite Radio Station; Current: Internet-Only Radio Station

Links
- Website: SiriusXM: Cinemagic

CineMagic is an Internet-only channel on Sirius XM radio, accessible via computers and mobile devices. Before July 1, 2011, the channel had its own XM satellite radio bandwidth in addition to the online channel. It is devoted to film scores, source music, and dialogue from movie soundtracks. Dave Ziemer was the channel's founder and its programming director from February 2001 to February 14, 2013, when he was laid off. Chris Panico served as CineMagic' s music director from November 2004 to November 2008, when he was laid off. Paul Bachmann is the channel's current host.

== Programming summary ==
Sirius XM once described the channel as follows:

CineMagic captures the movie experience via score music, soundtracks and film clips. It's also a destination for movie news and information, plus interviews with stars and directors.

The current channel description reads:

Relive exciting, dramatic, comedic and romantic movie moments through the magic of movie music.

The channel's original mission statement, as drafted by Dave Ziemer, was to build the world's largest library of film scores and soundtracks, and to create shows detailing behind-the-scenes information of various films. According to Ziemer, "We had a slogan in the early days of XM called AFDI (Actually F****** Doing It), which meant if you had a great idea go ahead and make it happen no matter what. Don't be afraid because it doesn't fall within the realm of normal radio, just make it happen. That was something I strived for, and I hope I was able to achieve it . . . with CineMagic."

At one point, the managers of CineMagic had a library exceeding 30,000 film audio clips and 20,000 songs to be utilized within the channel. However, after the 2008 merger of XM and Sirius, disputes over legality caused the integrated clips to be dropped from the line-up.

Under Dave Ziemer's management, CineMagic produced weekly features highlighting movie news, Blu-ray reviews, and theatrical film reviews. In addition, Ziemer developed and maintained relationships with film studios, publicists, and recording industry professionals. As a result, CineMagic often played tracks from new film scores, sometimes before they were officially released. The relationships Ziemer maintained also opened the door for the Reel Time interviews of major filmmakers. All of the channel's playlists were created, maintained, evaluated, and scheduled through the Powergold scheduling system. Ziemer would often personally respond to emails and song requests when on-the-air.

Additionally, the channel maintained seasonal playlists for holidays. Halloween was a particular favourite of the Cinemagic staff. It was celebrated on the Annual Halloween Horror Festival, first held in 2004, and celebrated on Big Scare, an uninterrupted horror movie soundtrack marathon taking place on Halloween night (also started in 2004). Starting in 2009, the channel's Halloween festivities also included CineMagic' s Halloween Horror Score Chop down, a countdown of the scariest horror scores of all time (chosen by composers and filmmakers who were fans of the channel, as well as SiriusXM subscribers and the channel's fans at the xmfan.com website).

Occasionally, Ziemer's CineMagic also ran special events (separate from its Thematic Friday programming). At one point, the channel hosted an 8-hour continuous marathon of Hans Zimmer tracks and scores. In 2009, CineMagic ran a week-long tribute in honour of the late Jerry Goldsmith's 80th birthday. On Wednesday, June 29, 2011, the station ran five uninterrupted hours of Bernard Herrmann's music in honour of his 100th birthday. On Friday, February 15, 2013, Cinemagic belatedly celebrated John Williams' 81st birthday by playing 16 straight hours of his music.

Under the current format, the Halloween specials, source music, movie news, reviews, and interviews have been dropped from the programming. However, the station still broadcasts a variety of film scores, including those of Star Wars, The Lord of the Rings, Gladiator, Chinatown, The Incredibles, Gone with the Wind, Kill Bill Vol. 1&2, Moulin Rouge, Back to the Future, To Kill a Mockingbird, and Air Force One.

== History ==
Prior to XM going on the air (and even before its first satellite was launched), Dave Ziemer, one of the original XM program directors, was asked to design, develop, and run a channel strictly pertaining to movies. Though Ziemer had not created a channel before, Ziemer' s boss at the time gave him free rein to do as he wished with the channel's programming. Thus, CineMagic was created in 2001 as part of the original XM channel line-up.

XM Radio Canada added the channel on April 1, 2007. After a brief stint on Sirius Canada's satellite radio service in 2009, the company relegated CineMagic to an online channel designated SIR-9. However, in September 2009, in the midst of the Toronto International Film Festival, Sirius Canada abruptly removed CineMagic from the overall line-up. Initially, the Sirius Call Centre was not made aware of the channel's removal.

According to the ratings data company Arbitron, CineMagic' s spring 2007 ratings in the US showed an AQH of 800 and a cumulative number of 50,600 listeners.

Prior to November 12, 2008, CineMagic was broadcast in the United States on XM channel 27. From November 12, 2008 through January 1, 2009, CineMagic was put on hiatus. During this time, Christmas music was broadcast on channel 27. On January 2, 2009, CineMagic began broadcasting again from its new home on XM channel 76. In addition, due to the XM and Sirius merger earlier in 2008, CineMagic was broadcast on Sirius channel 81 (Dish Network 6081) starting on January 2. However, at 6 pm Eastern Time on January 5, 2009, after only four days of operation, CineMagic was no longer available on channel 81. No expiration warning was distributed by Sirius prior to the cancellation. It was replaced on January 15 with The Strobe, a disco-themed channel that apparently returned due to subscriber demand. Nonetheless, due to a technological glitch, channel 81 still played CineMagic for a short time afterwards. CineMagic was also on DirecTV channel 822 until all Sirius XM programming was dropped in favour of Sonic Tap on February 9, 2010. On May 4, 2011, CineMagic was moved to XM channel 73 and Sirius Internet radio channel 806.

On June 24, 2011, SiriusXM announced that CineMagic would be removed from the XM channel line-up on July 1. Going forward, CineMagic would be exclusively available online via channel 806, for an extra subscription fee. When emailed about the decision, Jeremy Coleman, senior vice president of programming at SiriusXM, responded in a form reply: "Every now and then, we have to pull a channel off our service. Our system and bandwidth only allow for so many channels.... Any change we make, even if it allows us to add something new that pleases a large number of people and expand our subscriber base, will upset those that loved the channel we are removing and that’s certainly the case for CineMagic..." In contrast, Dave Ziemer posted on CineMagic' s Facebook page: "Ok everyone, here's the situation. Long story sort of short: As part of the merger agreement, SiriusXM is supposed to carry a certain number of minority owned channels. The FCC approved the channels and the company is slowly instituting them. Bandwidth is an issue and certain channels needed to be dropped to make room for them and unfortunately CineMagic was one such channel."

The final selection aired on CineMagic' s XM satellite radio station leading up to midnight of July 1, 2011, was "So Long, Farewell (Auf Weidersehen, Goodbye)" from The Sound of Music. The song was cut off abruptly during this final broadcast. The bandwidth was then transferred over to BYU Radio, a Mormon interest group, on channel 143.

Currently, in both the US and Canada, CineMagic is on SiriusXM Internet-only channel 750.

It appears the channel has been totally removed as of December, 2021.

Update 6-2-2022 CineMagic is still on the air as a SiriusXM extra channel, though the variety of music is limited, it is still with us. if you have the Sirius XM app, or voice enabled speakers that have the app connected you can ask for it to play.

== Former programs ==
- Reel Time -- A program of hour-long interviews, each focusing on a featured movie. Interview subjects included directors, actors, cinematographers, and others in the film industry. The interviews entailed questions about the featured movie's plot, characters, acting, visuals, camera work, entertainment value, unique elements, and its score. The show was hosted by program director Dave Ziemer, and sometimes co-hosted by music director Chris Panico during his tenure with the channel. "Mark Says Hi," a.k.a. Mark Seman, occasionally co-hosted after Panico was laid off. Before the move to Internet-only channel 806, Reel Time re-runs would be played at various times throughout the week. On July 7, 2011, Reel Time was relocated to channel 104, "SiriusXM Stars Too," and could be heard on Thursdays from 6:00pm–7:00pm ET, Fridays from 9:00pm–10:00pm ET, and Saturdays/Sundays from 1:00pm–2:00pm ET. However, channel 104 has since been discontinued, and the program is defunct.
- On the Score -- A program involving interviews with film composers, often covering the interviewee's entire career. The program was hosted by Daniel Schweiger. After CineMagic' s move to channel 806, On the Score was dropped from the programming line-up. It eventually found a new producer in Film Music Magazine. Daniel Schweiger remains as the show's host, and it is sponsored by La-La Land Records.
- PopFlix -- A program that played source music from movies such as Ferris Bueller's Day Off, Zodiac, and Spider-Man 3.
- Thematic Friday -- A program aired on Fridays featuring themed playlists. These themes ranged from film franchises (such as Harry Potter), to hours of programming dedicated to a single composer.

== Personnel ==
Former:

- Dave Ziemer, founder, programming director, host of Reel Time.
- Chris Panico, music director, occasional co-host of Reel Time.
- Daniel Schweiger, film music journalist and host of On the Score.
- "Mark Says Hi," a.k.a. Mark Seman, occasional co-host of Reel Time after Pacino's departure from CineMagic.

Current:

- Paul Bachmann, CineMagic host.
