= Studio 54 Radio =

Sirius XM satellite radio channel

- Broadcast area: United States; Canada
- Frequencies: Sirius XM 54; Dish Network 6054

Programming
- Format: '70s and ‘80s Dance Hits

Ownership
- Owner: Sirius XM Radio

History
- First air date: November 12, 2008 (As The Strobe); August 15, 2011 (As Studio 54 Radio)
- Former names: The Strobe; BBC Radio 1

Technical information
- Class: Satellite Radio Station

Links
- Website: Studio 54 Radio

Studio 54 Radio is a disco and freestyle music radio station. The station is operated by Sirius XM Radio and is classified under the "Dance/Electronic" category. The channel was originally known as The Strobe from 2002 to 2011, when it was relaunched under its current incarnation, an homage to the New York City discothèque Studio 54.

On November 12, 2008, The Strobe was eliminated from the Sirius lineup as a result of the Sirius/XM channel lineup reorganization. On December 16, due to subscriber demand, Sirius XM Radio announced that the channel would be reactivated on January 15, 2009.

On January 15, 2009, The Strobe returned to the Sirius lineup and made its debut on XM (on XM83, where the similarly-formatted Chrome had been prior to the November 2008 channel realignment).

On May 28, 2010 through noon on June 1, 2010, Beach Party Radio replaced The Strobe for the Memorial Day Weekend. On July 1, 2010 though July 7, 2010 at 3 AM ET, Beach Party Radio again replaced The Strobe for the July 4th weekend. On September 3, 2010 at 9 AM, Beach Party Radio replaced The Strobe until Tuesday, September 7, 2010.

On October 22, 2010 at 6 PM ET, "The Strobe" was removed from satellite broadcasts and will now only be heard online. It was replaced with Pearl Jam Radio, a channel playing the music of the band Pearl Jam. The last song on "The Strobe" before the change took effect was "Last Dance" by Donna Summer.

On August 15, 2011, Studio 54 Radio premiered. Studio 54, unlike The Strobe, focuses on deeper disco cuts, rare mixes, and club classics. Much like Sirius XM's other themed channels, Studio 54 Radio is based entirely around the Studio 54 theme and era. It features testimonials, talk shows, and live mixes from former employees and DJs of the nightclub.

On May 8, 2013, Sirius XM moved Studio 54 Radio from channel 15 to channel 54, putting it in line with the Sirius XM Dance channel line up and with its channel position to better match its branding. It can also be heard on Dish Network channel 6054 (Hopper channel 99-54).

On August 4, 2016, Sirius XM expanded the format presentation of Studio 54 Radio to include Dance hits from the 1990s and 2000s due to the supposed elimination of Utopia when it moved to online only/modern SiriusXM Radios, although Utopia continues to become available as part of SiriusXM’s XTRA offerings.

The current channel description reads:

Studio 54 Radio is the Ultimate Classic Dance Experience. From classic dance and disco music and legendary DJs to the original doorman who decided whether you got in or went home, Studio 54 Radio is the ultimate re-creation of dance music's greatest era.

== Featured Programs ==
- The Marc & Myra Show
- Purple Disco Tales
- The Nu Disco Hour
- Get Into the Groove with DJ James Anthony
- Jellybean Benitez In The Mix

== See also ==
- List of Sirius Satellite Radio stations
