= SiriusXM Urban View =

- Broadcast area: United States
- Frequencies: XM126; SR126

Programming
- Format: Talk radio
- Affiliations: Syndication One; Sporting News Radio; Public Radio International

Ownership
- Owner: Sirius XM Radio

History
- First air date: 2001

Technical information
- Class: Satellite Radio Station

Links
- Website: Urban View

SiriusXM Urban View is an African American talk radio channel on XM Satellite Radio 126 (previously 128). The subjects cover those relevant to the Black community, such as politics, economics, and social issues.

The channel was originally programmed by Radio One, Inc., a Washington, D.C.–based company specializing in African American and urban radio formats.

== History ==
In August 2007, Radio One overhauled The Power's daytime programming by affiliating it with its Syndication One subsidiary, the company's syndication arm. Radio programs Keepin' it Real with Reverend Al Sharpton, 2 Live Stews, and The Warren Ballentine Show were added to the schedule August 13, 2007. We Ourselves and Studio B were no longer heard on XM Radio, and Make it Plain With Mark Thompson moved to SiriusXM Progress (SiriusXM channel 127), but was canceled in 2019.

Later in 2007, Syndication One announced that it would be folding its unit, and several of their programs would be canceled. One of these, the 2 Live Stews, was signed by Sporting News Radio. That same year, Joe Madison The Black Eagle joined the lineup.

On January 1, 2008, XM Satellite Radio gained full control of The Power from Radio One, Inc. In February 2013, The Power was renamed Urban View, moving to channel 126 on May 9, 2013. Joe Madison The Black Eagle remained a cornerstone of Urban View until Mr. Madison's passing in January 2024. To honor his legacy, the channel airs Madison Classics weekdays from 6 a.m. to 7 a.m. EST.

== Shows ==
The following shows air on Urban View:

- The Karen Hunter Show
- Joe Madison, Madison Classics
- The Clay Cane Show
- The Reecie Colbert Show
- Keepin' It Real With Al Sharpton
- The Omi Show
- For Your Soul w/ Rev. Dr. DeForest Soaries
- The Lurie Daniels Favors Show
- Urban View Mornings
- Sunday Civics With L. Joy Williams
- The Lou Hutt Show
- Inside the Issues with Wilmer Leon
- The Mike Muse Show
- The Qasim Rashid Show
- The Dr. Robin Show
