= The Bridge (SiriusXM) =

Sirius XM satellite radio channel

- Broadcast area: United States; Canada
- Frequencies: Sirius XM Radio 14; Dish Network 6032

Programming
- Format: Soft rock/Adult contemporary (1960s-1990s)

Ownership
- Owner: Sirius XM Radio

History
- Former frequencies: Sirius XM 10 (2004-2008); Sirius XM 32 (2008-2020); Sirius XM 17 (2020-2023); Sirius XM 27 (2023-2026)

Technical information
- Class: Satellite radio station

Links
- Website: SiriusXM: The Bridge

The Bridge is on Sirius XM Radio channel 14 and Dish Network 6032. It is devoted to gold-based soft rock and adult contemporary music. The channel is programmed by Mary Sue Twohy. The channel plays mainly 1970s acts, such as Fleetwood Mac, James Taylor, Carole King, Jackson Browne, Elton John, Jim Croce, the Eagles, America, and Billy Joel, along with some later 1980s and 1990s artists like Sting, Bonnie Raitt, and others. It was basically the 1960s and 1970s counterpart of the former StarLite channel for the Sirius service before the Sirius/XM merger replaced StarLite with The Blend (which covers adult contemporary music from the 1970s-now).

== History and Past Removals ==
The Bridge, originally on Sirius channel 10, has often been removed from the lineup when the service wants to devote a channel to a single artist for a period of time, such as the Rolling Stones or the Who. On September 27, 2007, it was displaced by E Street Radio, devoted to the music of Bruce Springsteen. The channel could still be heard on Sirius' internet stream, however. These frequent and long-lasting periods of preemption have angered many subscribers.

The Bridge returned to the Sirius satellites on June 24, 2008 on channel 12, forcing Super Shuffle to take the SIR-2 stream formerly used by The Bridge.

On November 1, 2008, channel 12 switched to Led Zeppelin Radio, with The Bridge moved to channel 33. On November 12, 2008, channel 12 became The Pulse as part of the Sirius/XM merger, moving Led Zeppelin Radio to channel 33 and forcing The Bridge to go on hiatus for the rest of the year. The Bridge returned to Sirius (and debuted on XM) on January 1, 2009. The Bridge is available on Dish Network channel 6032. Until February 9, 2010, it was heard on DirecTV channel 849, but all of the SiriusXM programming was dropped in favor of Sonic Tap by DMX.

From February 14-March 13, 2009, the channel was temporarily pre-empted for Fireman Radio, a channel devoted to the music of Paul McCartney. From October 15-October 22, 2010, it was again pre-empted for Elton!, a channel devoted to the music of Elton John. From November 29-December 26, 2010, The Bridge was again pre-empted for Band on the Run Radio, another Paul McCartney oriented format.

On June 18, 2020, The Bridge moved from channel 32 to channel 17, replacing PopRocks. U2 X Radio took over The Bridge's former slot.

On November 8, 2023, The Bridge moved from channel 17 to channel 27, replacing Deep Tracks. Similarly formatted Yacht Rock Radio, and later, The Coffee House took over The Bridge's former slot.

On February 2, 2026, The Bridge moved once again from channel 27 to channel 14, moving the Life with John Mayer programming to channel 4. Alt 2k (2000s Alternative) took over the channel 27 slot.

On November 2, 2026, The Bridge moved to channel 145 as Jimmy Fallon's Holiday Seasoning Radio has temporarily replaced its channel 14 spot for the holiday season. Listeners that have The Bridge channel 14 as its preset on their receivers prior to the holiday music announcement will automatically be redirected to channel 145.

== See also ==
- List of Sirius Satellite Radio stations
