= Symphony Hall (SiriusXM) =

Classical music Sirius XM Radio station

- Broadcast area: United States; Canada
- Frequencies: Sirius XM Radio 66; Dish Network 6076

Programming
- Format: Classical music

Ownership
- Owner: Sirius XM Radio

Technical information
- Class: Satellite Radio Station

Links
- Website: SiriusXM: Symphony Hall

Symphony Hall is a Sirius XM Radio station featuring exclusively classical music. It is located on Sirius XM Radio channel 66 and DISH Network channel 6076. Originally Sirius only, it was merged with the XM Classics channel on November 12, 2008.

Pablo Salazar is the current program director for Symphony Hall, Symphony Hall Just Music, SiriusXM Pops and Strings.

Martin Goldsmith, Robert Aubry Davis, Colleen Wheelahan, John Clare, Paul Bachmann, and Vincent Caruso are the channel's current on-air voices. Preston Trombly hosted until 2026. Special programs include: SiriusXM Presents The Philadelphia Orchestra, Living American, Classics On Film, Weekend Pops, Millennium of Music, Vox Choral, Baroque and Beyond, The Weekend Show with Martin Goldsmith and The Chamber Music Society of Lincoln Center. The channel also carried the syndicated daily program Exploring Music prior to April 2010.

Between 12 AM and 6 AM (ET), the channel's programming consists of automated classical music selections, with no on-air hosts.

Since the SiriusXM merger, Symphony Hall has competed with Sirius XM Pops for classical music listeners. However, on July 10, 2014, SiriusXM announced SiriusXM Pops would close and merge with Symphony Hall. The former SiriusXM Pops station is still available as an online-only station on the SiriusXM app.

== Holiday Pops ==
Beginning at noon on Christmas Eve through Christmas Day each year, Symphony Hall is preempted on the satellite service by Holiday Pops, one of SiriusXM's holiday stations that plays classical Christmas music featuring both vocal and instrumental holiday pieces. During this time, the regular Symphony Hall programming is still available as an online station. Holiday Pops is available for a longer period online, starting on the first Monday in December and running until Christmas Day.

== Core artists ==
- John Adams
- Ludwig van Beethoven
- Johann Sebastian Bach
- Joshua Bell
- Johannes Brahms
- Antonin Dvorak
- Gustavo Dudamel
- Joseph Haydn
- Jennifer Higdon
- Yuja Wang
- Alan Hovhaness
- Arcangelo Corelli
- Sergei Rachmaninoff
- Wolfgang Amadeus Mozart
- Aaron Copland

== See also ==
- List of Sirius Satellite Radio stations
- List of XM Satellite Radio channels
