= List of country television and radio shows =

The following lists American TV and radio shows of note that were either predominantly related to country music or had a significant impact on the country music genre:

== Shows ==
Listed alphabetically:

- ABC Barn Dance - 1949, spin-off of the National Barn Dance radio program
- American Idol - 2002–present, a singing competition on Fox that spans many popular genres, including country music. The show has launched the careers of several country stars, including season 4 winner Carrie Underwood, season 10 winner Scotty McCreery, Kellie Pickler, Bucky Covington, Josh Gracin, Kristy Lee Cook, Danny Gokey, Casey James, Crystal Bowersox, and Lauren Alaina. Season 1 winner Kelly Clarkson, while primarily specializing in pop rock, has also dabbled in the country format.
- Austin City Limits, 1976–present, PBS
- The Beverly Hillbillies, situation comedy series that featured a country theme song and appearances by Lester Flatt and Earl Scruggs
- Can You Duet? (CMT, 2008–2009), launched the careers of Steel Magnolia and Joey & Rory, among others
- Country Hoedown (1956–65), CBC country-western music series.
- Country Showdown (1982–present), national country music talent search; finals have aired on GAC and TNN
- Country Style, DuMont Network
- Country Style, USA, syndicated by the US Army as a recruiting aid
- Crook & Chase, hosted by Lorianne Crook and Charlie Chase, 1986 to present, currently on Heartland. A radio countdown show also bears the name.
- Cross Canada Barndance, 1961–1962, charter program of the CTV Television Network (Canada)
- Crossroads, 2002–present, limited-run program on CMT that features country musicians playing music sets with non-country singers, usually rock musicians
- Don Messer's Jubilee, 1957–1973, CBC and syndicated program responsible for popularizing folk and country music in Canada
- Five Star Jubilee, 1961 program on NBC-TV (spin-off of Jubilee USA)
- The Ford Show, 1956–1961 (NBC), a general variety program hosted by country-western and gospel singer Tennessee Ernie Ford
- The Glen Campbell Goodtime Hour, 1969–1972
- Glór Tíre (Country Voice) reality TV from Galway, Ireland on TG4, 2003–2009
- Grand Ole Opry, simulcast of the radio program, has aired on ABC (1955–56), PBS (1978–81), TNN (1985–2001), CMT (2001–03), and GAC (2003–09).
- Hannah Montana, from Disney Channel, features Billy Ray Cyrus as retired country superstar "Robbie Ray Stewart" (an obvious fictional portrayal of Cyrus himself), the father of the titular character, teenager-turned-rock star "Hannah Montana/Miley Stewart" (played by Cyrus's real-life daughter, Miley Cyrus).
- Hayloft Hoedown on ABC from Philadelphia, 1948
- Hee Haw, featuring Buck Owens and Roy Clark as co-hosts, although Owens departed the series at the end of the 1986 season; popular for its purposely cornball jokes, shapely women, and country music guest stars; The series ran on network television, 1969–1971, but was picked up in syndication beginning with the '71-'72 season and remained on the air through May 1992.
- The Johnny Cash Show (1969–1971) on ABC-TV
- The Lawrence Welk Show (1951–1982), general musical variety program that launched the careers of country musicians Lynn Anderson, Clay Hart and Ava Barber, as well as occasional country singers Guy Hovis and Ralna English
- Lost Highway, a significant BBC documentary on the history of country music
- Midwestern Hayride, on WLW-TV in Cincinnati, Ohio and later carried nationally by NBC and then ABC
- Nashville, 2012–present, ABC hourlong drama series about country musicians. The series has released several singles as tie-ins to the TV show, many of which have reached the lower ends of the Hot Country Songs charts. (Not to be confused with the 2007 docudrama of the same name that lasted only two episodes.)
- Nashville Now, hosted live by Ralph Emery, the cornerstone nightly program for The Nashville Network from 1983 through 1993. Featured puppet co-host Shotgun Red.
- Nashville On the Road, syndicated 1976–1983, weekly country music variety series hosted by Jim Ed Brown and featuring co-stars Jerry Clower, Helen Cornelius and Wendy Holcombe; acts ranged from house vocal groups to current superstars. Brown was replaced by Jim Stafford in 1981, who hosted the final two seasons.
- Nashville Star country music talent show that produced such stars as Miranda Lambert, Buddy Jewell, George Canyon, Chris Young, Kacey Musgraves and Sean Patrick McGraw
- The Old American Barn Dance, DuMont Network, 1953
- Ozark Jubilee, 1955–1960, ABC - the first network TV series featuring country music stars. Hosted by Red Foley and was renamed County Music Jubilee in 1957 and Jubilee USA in 1958.
- Pop! Goes the Country, a weekly syndicated country music variety television series, hosted by Ralph Emery, from 1974 to 1980, and then Tom T Hall during 1980–1981, and lastly Jim Varney for a handful of episodes through 1982.
- Real Country, Country Music series appearing on the USA network, 2018 to present
- Talent Varieties, a country music talent show in 1955 on ABC-TV.
- The Porter Wagoner Show, aired from 1960 to 1981 and featured a young Dolly Parton and Mel Tillis.
- That Good Ole Nashville Music, 1970–1985
- Troubadour, TX, 2011–present, regionally syndicated television series following the lives of various singers and songwriters as they chase their dreams (or, for successful artists, live their dreams) across the state of Texas. The series features performance and documentary elements.
- Saturday Night Jamboree from New York on NBC, 1949–50.
- The Statler Brothers Show, the highest rated show on The Nashville Network from 1991 until its last episode in 1998.
- The Tommy Hunter Show, 1965–92, a weekly variety show starring Canadian musician Tommy Hunter; it replaced Country Hoedown on the CBC lineup and was seen in the United States on TNN from 1983 until 1992.
- Village Barn on NBC from 1948 to 50, broadcast from a New York City nightclub. The first (and first live) country music program on network TV
- The Wilburn Brothers Show, long running syndicated country variety television series, hosted by The Wilburn Brothers, running between 1963 and 1974. Launched the career of Loretta Lynn
- Windy City Jamboree from Chicago on DuMont Network, 1950

== Radio ==
Listed chronologically by date of first airing:

- National Barn Dance, the original country music radio show. (1924–1960)
- Grand Ole Opry, the most famous country music radio program, broadcasting on WSM from Nashville. (1925–present)
- Jamboree U-S-A, airing from WWVA in Wheeling, West Virginia. Spun off a popular music festival, the Jamboree in the Hills. (1933–2007). A "Wheeling Jamboree" on rival station WKKX (2010–2014) and WWOV-LP (since 2014) claims this series (but not the Jamboree in the Hills, which spun off as a separate company) as part of its history.
- Renfro Valley Barn Dance, 1939–1957, stage show continues to bear the name
- Renfro Valley Gatherin', Sunday morning country music program airing nationally from Renfro Valley, Kentucky. (1943–present)
- Korn’s-A-Krackin’, from KWTO in Springfield, Missouri and carried by the Mutual Broadcasting System (1946-195?).
- Old Dominion Barn Dance, from WRVA in Richmond, Virginia. (1946–1957)
- Big D Jamboree, from KRLD in Dallas, Texas. (1947–1960s)
- Midnite Jamboree, from the Ernest Tubb Record Shop in Nashville. (1947–present)
- Louisiana Hayride, featured Hank Williams and Elvis Presley in their early years. (1948–1960)
- The Red Foley Show, 1954–1961 on NBC.
- Ozark Jubilee, 1954–1961, from KWTO-AM. Helped launch the careers of Porter Wagoner, Brenda Lee and other country and rockabilly stars. Aired on ABC Radio from 1954 to 1960, and on NBC Radio from 1960 to 1961.
- U.S. 1 Trucking Show/Midnight Cowboy Radio Network, overnight country music and talk show based in the Dallas-Fort Worth Metroplex, targeted toward truck drivers, hosted by Bill Mack (1969–2003). Mack continues a show on satellite radio, while the original show itself is now the Midnight Radio Network, a talk-only program hosted by Eric Harley.
- American Country Countdown, 1973–present. Spinoff of American Top 40 hosted by Don Bowman (1973–1978), Bob Kingsley (1978–2005), and Kix Brooks (2006–present). Features the top 30 country songs of the week based on the Billboard Country Airplay chart. Originally distributed by ABC Radio Networks, today sent via Cumulus Media Network's Best Country Today.
- The Silver Eagle Cross Country Radio Show (later American Eagle ...), 1981-late 1980s, featuring live performances of current and up-and-coming stars along with interviews, via ABC Radio Networks.
- Live From Gilley's, 1980-late 1980s, featuring live performances of current and up-and-coming country performers, originating from Gilley's Club in Pasadena, Texas.
- The Weekly Country Music Countdown, 1981-c. 2009, via United Stations Programming Network (predecessor of the United Stations Radio Network) and later Westwood One, hosted by Chris Charles and produced by Ed Salamon. Three-hour weekly program featuring the top 30 songs of the past week (according to Radio & Records), along with interviews from a featured artist of the week, a countdown of the top 5 hits from a week in the past and a calendar feature.
- Country Six Pack, 1982-unknown, series of specials airing on the six major holidays (or holiday weekends) throughout the year, produced by Ed Salamon and distributed by United Stations Programming Network (later Westwood One). Specials focused on various topics or themes (such as a family theme for Thanksgiving, or a salute to American locations for the Fourth of July), Country Music Association award winners, and salutes to artists observing anniversary milestones (usually at least 10 years, then 20 and 25 and every five years thereafter). The Christmas special was called "Christmas In the Country," with artist interviews and their songs often played in blocks, while starting in 1994 came a year-in-review program. Unofficially tied to the specials were one-off Valentine's Day-themed shows, those featuring love ballads.
- On a Country Road, 1982–1992, hosted by Lee Arnold and via the Mutual Broadcasting Network, later Westwood One. Featured spotlight artists, mini-features, trivia Nashville news and more.
- Solid Gold Country, 1983–1993, via United Stations Programming Network (predecessor of the United Stations Radio Network) produced by Ed Salamon. Originally presented as a three-hour weekly show, reformatted in 1985 as a daily one-hour magazine-type series (with the option for affiliates to air the program in a five-hour block, such as on the weekends) with artist salutes, top hits of a past year from the currently-airing week (e.g., "this week in 1987"), gold records from a month gone by, monthly calendar previews, producer and songwriter profiles, awards program (saluting past winners) and festival previews, and other themes on virtually every conceivable topic. Interview clips were also included. Chart data was via Radio & Records (for 1973-later songs). Hosts were Stan Martin (1983-1985), Joel Sebastian (1985) Mike Fitzgerald (1985-1990) and Charlie Cook (1990–1993).
- Country Music's Top Ten, 1983–1992. One-hour program presenting the week's top 10 country hits per Radio & Records, along with a feature artist interview, a top 10 song from that week a year earlier, and a "pick hit" (a song that, in the judgement of the hosts and producers, would become a future top 10 hit). Originally hosted by industry executive Charlie Cook (currently an executive with Cumulus Media) and Los Angeles radio personality Janine Wolf (from 1983 to 1987), later by a series of hosts after the show was reformatted.
- The Truckin' Bozo, overnight country music and talk show targeted toward truck drivers, hosted by Dale Sommers. (1984–2003, continued as a talk-only program on satellite radio until Sommers's death in 2012)
- Crook & Chase, hosted by Lorianne Crook and Charlie Chase (1986–present). Longtime countdown program featuring the top 30 songs of the week (via Mediabase), with interviews of artists by the hosts.
- Country Countdown USA, radio countdown hosted by Lon Helton. (1992–present) Helton and a co-host – always a current star – count down the top 30 country songs of the week based on the Country Aircheck chart (originally Radio & Records and later Mediabase). Initially included reports from affiliates’ program directors on hot-breaking new hits.
- Country Gold, classic country request program hosted at various times in its history by Mike Fitzgerald (1992–99), Big John Howell (1999 – 2006), and Josh "Rowdy Yates" Holstead (2006–12). A split in the ownership of the show in 2012 led to two shows bearing the name: one hosted by Holstead, and another by Randy Owen (2012–2016) and currently Terri Clark
- After Midnite, nationally syndicated overnight country music program hosted by Blair Garner (1993–2013), Cody Alan (2014–2021), Granger Smith now Hosts After Midnite Garner now hosts America's Morning Show.
- The Lia Show, nationally syndicated evening country music and interview program hosted by Lia Knight. (mid-1990s to present)
- Country Music Greats Radio Show, hosted by Jim Ed Brown (2003–2015) Bill Cody (2015–present)
- Country Top 40, hosted by Bob Kingsley (2006-2019) and Fitz (2020-present); guest hosts filled in from October through December 2019 upon Kingsley's departure (due to health issues and subsequent death). Chart information is based on Mediabase (originally Radio & Records). Show began after Kingsley's departure from American Country Countdown, which he had hosted from 1978 to 2005.
- American Country Gold, syndicated one hour weekly US & Canada, recorded country hits 50's-60's plus interviews and commentary, hosted by Freddy Carr 2008–2016. 416 shows were produced and solely owned by Freddy Carr. In 2016 full ownership of all master recordings of the show was acquired by a U. K. broadcast syndication group for re-run scheduling throughout Western Europe. Included in the purchase was 416 shows and syndication contracts with 517 independent radio stations.
- Country Crossroads, 1969-at least mid-2000s, 30-minute program hosted by Bill Mack and Jerry Clower, along with a guest artist each week, with songs and themes focusing on the Christian faith. Each program also included a brief sermonette and/or other positive, uplifting message. At its peak, the show – which ran for at least 30 years and was aired by many stations on Sundays – was syndicated to more than 800 stations across the country, and a similar cable television was show aired on FamilyNet.

== See also ==
- Country music
- Academy of Country Music
- Country Music Association
- WSM Radio
- Country Music Hall of Fame
- Country Music Television
- Great American Country
- List of country genres
- Rural purge
