= Jim Ed Brown discography =

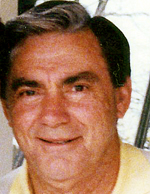
- Jim Ed Brown in 1993
- Studio albums: 22
- Compilation albums: 2
- Singles: 51

The discography for American country music artist Jim Ed Brown consists of twenty-two studio albums, two compilation albums and fifty-one singles.

== Studio albums ==
=== 1960s ===
Title	Details	Peak positions
Title	Details	US Country
Alone with You	Release date: 1966; Label: RCA Victor	6
Just Jim	Release date: 1967; Label: RCA Victor	32
Gems by Jim	Release date: 1967; Label: RCA Victor	9
Bottle, Bottle	Release date: 1968; Label: RCA Victor	20
Country's Best On Record	Release date: 1968; Label: RCA Victor	28
This Is My Beat!	Release date: 1968; Label: RCA Victor	39
Remember Me	Release date: 1969; Label: RCA Victor	37
Sings the Browns	Release date: 1969; Label: RCA Victor	—
"—" denotes releases that did not chart

=== 1970s–2010s ===
Title	Details	Peak chart positions	
Title	Details	US Country	US
Going Up the Country	Release date: 1970; Label: RCA Victor	—	—
Just for You	Release date: 1970; Label: RCA Victor	—	—
Morning	Release date: 1971; Label: RCA Victor	9	81
Angel's Sunday	Release date: 1971; Label: RCA Victor	25	—
She's Leavin'	Release date: 1971; Label: RCA Victor	41	—
Evening	Release date: 1972; Label: RCA Victor	—	—
Brown Is Blue	Release date: 1972; Label: RCA Victor	—	—
Bar-Rooms & Pop-a-Tops	Release date: 1973; Label: RCA Victor	28	—
It's That Time of Night	Release date: 1974; Label: RCA Victor	26	—
In Style Again	Release date: January 20, 2015; Label: Plowboy Records	—	—
"—" denotes releases that did not chart

=== Albums with Helen Cornelius ===
Title	Details	Peak chart positions	
Title	Details	US Country	CAN Country
I Don't Want to Have to Marry You	Release date: 1976; Label: RCA Victor	7	—
Born Believer	Release date: 1977; Label: RCA Victor	17	—
I'll Never Be Free	Release date: 1978; Label: RCA Victor	29	—
You Don't Bring Me Flowers	Release date: 1979; Label: RCA Victor	20	2
One Man, One Woman	Release date: 1980; Label: RCA Victor	35	—
Together Again	Release date: 2007; Label: Door Knob Records	—	—
"—" denotes releases that did not chart

== Compilation albums ==
Title	Details	Peak positions
Title	Details	US Country
Best of Jim Ed Brown	Release date: 1973; Label: RCA Victor	21
Greatest Hits (with Helen Cornelius)	Release date: 1981; Label: RCA Victor	47

== Singles ==
=== 1960s ===
Year	Single	Peak chart positions		Album
Year	Single	US Country	CAN Country	Album
1965	"I Heard from a Memory Last Night"	33	—	Alone with You
1965	"I'm Just a Country Boy"	37	—	Alone with You
1966	"Regular On My Mind"	41	—	Alone with You
1966	"A Taste of Heaven"	23	—	Alone with You
1966	"The Last Laugh"	57	—	Just Jim
1967	"You Can Have Her"	18	—	Just Jim
1967	"Pop a Top"	3	—	Just Jim
1967	"Bottle, Bottle"	13	4	Bottle, Bottle
1968	"The Cajun Stripper"	23	11	This Is My Beat!
1968	"The Enemy"	13	11	This Is My Beat!
1968	"Jack and Jill"	49	—	—N/a
1969	"Longest Beer of the Night"	35	—	This Is My Beat!
1969	"Man and Wife Time"	17	—	Remember Me
1969	"The Three Bells"	29	22	Sings the Browns
"—" denotes releases that did not chart

=== 1970s–2010s ===
Year	Single	Peak chart positions			Album
Year	Single	US Country	CAN Country	CAN AC	Album
1970	"Ginger Is Gentle and Waiting for Me"	35	—	—	Going Up the Country
1970	"Lift Ring, Pull Open"	71	—	—	Just for You
1970	"Baby, I Tried"	31	—	—	—N/a
1970	"Morning"^{[A]}	4	2	14	Morning
1971	"Angel's Sunday"	13	12	26	Angel's Sunday
1971	"She's Leavin' (Bonnie, Please Don't Go)"	37	27	—	She's Leavin'
1972	"Evening"	55	22	—	Evening
1972	"How I Love Them Old Songs"	57	—	—	Evening
1972	"All I Had to Do"	67	—	—	Brown Is Blue
1973	"Unbelievable Love"	29	28	—	Brown Is Blue
1973	"Southern Loving"	6	6	—	Bar-Rooms & Pop-a-Tops
1973	"Broad-Minded Man"	15	11	—	Best of Jim Ed Brown
1974	"Sometime Sunshine"	10	7	—	It's That Time of Night
1974	"It's That Time of Night"	10	—	—	It's That Time of Night
1974	"Get Up I Think I Love You"	47	36	—	—N/a
1975	"Don Junior"	63	—	—	—N/a
1975	"Barroom Pal, Goodtime Gals"	41	—	—	—N/a
1975	"Fine Time to Get the Blues"	52	—	—	—N/a
1976	"Another Morning"	24	19	—	—N/a
1976	"Let Me Love You Where It Hurts"	69	—	—	—N/a
1976	"I've Rode with the Best"	65	—	—	I Don't Want to Have to Marry You
1977	"When I Touch Her There"	66	—	—	—N/a
1979	"You're the Part of Me"	38	63	—	—N/a
2013	"In Style Again"	—	—	—	In Style Again
"—" denotes releases that did not chart

=== Singles with Helen Cornelius ===
Year	Single	Peak chart positions		Album
Year	Single	US Country	CAN Country	Album
1976	"I Don't Want to Have to Marry You"	1	7	I Don't Want to Have to Marry You
1976	"Saying Hello, Saying I Love You, Saying Goodbye"	2	1	I Don't Want to Have to Marry You
1977	"Born Believer"	12	8	Born Believer
1977	"If It Ain't Love by Now"	12	18	Born Believer
1977	"Fall Softly Snow"	91	—	—N/a
1978	"I'll Never Be Free"	11	27	I'll Never Be Free
1978	"If the World Ran Out of Love Tonight"	6	7	You Don't Bring Me Flowers
1978	"You Don't Bring Me Flowers"	10	8	You Don't Bring Me Flowers
1979	"Lying In Love with You"	2	3	You Don't Bring Me Flowers
1979	"Fools"	3	14	One Man, One Woman
1980	"Morning Comes Too Early"	5	46	One Man, One Woman
1980	"The Bedroom"	24	26	One Man, One Woman
1981	"Don't Bother to Knock"	13	48	Greatest Hits
"—" denotes releases that did not chart

=== As a featured artist ===
Year	Single	Artist	Peak positions
Year	Single	Artist	US Country
1967	"Chet's Tune"	Some of Chet's Friends	38

== Charted B-sides ==
Year	B-side	Peak positions	Original A-side
Year	B-side	US Country	Original A-side
1970	"Drink, Boys, Drink"	flip	"Ginger Is Gentle and Waiting for Me"

== Notes ==
- A "Morning" also peaked at number 47 on the Billboard Hot 100.
