= Classic country =

Mainstream country music hits from previous decades

Classic country is a music radio format that specializes in playing mainstream country and western music hits from past decades.

== Repertoire ==
The classic country radio format can actually be divided into two separate formats. The first specializes in hits from the 1950s through the early 1990s, and focuses primarily on innovators and artists from country music's Golden Age, including Hank Williams, Patsy Cline, George Jones, Kitty Wells, Charley Pride, Tammy Wynette, and Johnny Cash. The other focuses on hits from the 1990s and 2000s, some pre-1990s music, latter-day Golden Age stars and innovators such as Waylon Jennings, Willie Nelson, Johnny Paycheck, Kenny Rogers, Emmylou Harris, Dolly Parton, and Merle Haggard, to newer recurrent hits from neotraditional country and honky-tonk artists such as George Strait, Reba McEntire, Toby Keith, Garth Brooks, Alan Jackson, and Randy Travis.

== History ==
The format resulted largely from changes in the sound of country music in the late 1980s and the early 1990s, as it began moving to FM radio stations in and around major cities and absorbing some of the electric sounds of rock music; similar pressures also were a factor in the development of the Americana format at around the same time. These new FM country stations excluded older "classic" country artists from their playlists, even though artists, such as Merle Haggard, George Jones, Dolly Parton, Willie Nelson, Kenny Rogers and Emmylou Harris, were still actively performing and releasing new recordings, some of which were significant hits. When mainstream country radio began this practice in the mid-1990s, a large segment of older country fans felt alienated and turned away from mainstream country. Whereas modern country began moving to FM around this time, the classic country remained (and remains) one of the few formats that have proven ideal for AM radio, particularly in rural areas; before this transition, the country was primarily an AM radio phenomenon and was most widely popular in rural areas.

In 1998, Robert Unmacht, editor of the M Street Journal, said that thirty stations around the United States had switched to the format because many longtime country fans did not like what country radio was doing.

The same practice has seemed to follow to television, where Country Music Television and Great American Country rarely play any music videos produced before 1996, leaving heritage and "classic" artists to networks such as RFD-TV, which features a heavy complement of older programming such as Pop! Goes the Country, Porter Wagoner's programs, and The Wilburn Brothers Show, along with newer performances from heritage acts. CMT Pure Country, the all-music counterpart to CMT, relegated its classic country programming to a daily half-hour block known as "Pure Vintage" before abandoning classic country altogether by 2015. (Complicating matters somewhat is a relative lack of music videos for country music songs before the 1980s.)

Classic country remains a popular block format on mainstream country stations, usually on weekends, but sometimes over the week such as Jimmy Brooks's "Lunchtime Rewind" during the Noon lunch-break hour on WTGE in Baton Rouge.

== Related formats ==
As is the case with rock music (where classic rock, mainstream rock, and active rock all have varying amounts of older music), country music stations also can vary in the amount of "classic" content in their playlist, and formats exist for such stations. In addition to pure "classic country" stations, which play little to no current or recurrent country hits (i.e., recorded after about 2010), country music-formatted stations tend to fall under one of these formats:

- Traditional country: Primarily plays classic country but also plays newer country songs. Some traditional country stations feature a gold-based direction, drawing from country acts that were active in the 1990s and early 2000s (including new material and recurrent), and avoiding modern pop-influenced or "bro-country" songs.
- Adult country: Typified by the Nash Icon national format, adult country (there is no generally accepted name for the format) has a music set newer than a classic or traditional country station (seldom playing songs from before 1980) but not as reliant on current hits as a mainstream or hot country station. Such stations are more willing to play pop-oriented songs than classic or traditional country outlets. Nash Icon describes the format as an analogy: it is to the country as adult contemporary is to top 40.
- Mainstream country (or modern country): The most common country music format. Unlike traditional countries, the mainstream country is generally bound to a top 40 chart for the majority of its playlist, but the format allows stations to fill out the remaining playlists with a mix of classic and recent recurrent songs. In the context of the music industry, "country radio" is largely driven by mainstream country stations.
- Hot country: Focuses exclusively on top 40 country music and – except for a small number of recurrent hits no older than two or three years old – plays very little, if any, older music. Hot country stations may also include non-country pop songs in their rotation.
- A late-2010s format known as "The Wow Factor" attempted to cross the adult country format with classic hits. Its juxtaposition of country and pop bore similarity to the adult hits format. By 2020, The Wow Factor had largely cut its country titles.
- Americana: A more recent and emerging format that plays more Modern "Authentic Country music" that often plays music from the modern country subgenres of Americana and Alt-Country, along with roots music. Classic Country is also common on these stations and is often from the Honky Tonk, Hillbilly, Bluegrass, Western Swing, Bakersfield sound, and Outlaw Country subgenres. The station musical libraries usually vary from station to station as some stations might add in a few rock and mainstream country artists that have a more traditional country influence. This type of station format is the biggest in Texas and Oklahoma with Texas Country/Red Dirt music radio (with examples being KFWR and KHYI), this format is also popular online and for shows on public radio and college radio stations.

== Dividing line ==
With a few exceptions, the classic country genre has struggled as a radio format (unlike mainstream country stations). While it has a fiercely loyal audience, classic country stations often struggle to find advertisers. While advertisers are primarily interested in the 18 to 49-year-old demographic age group, classic country usually attracts an older audience. For perhaps that reason, country music fans are often (stereotypically) divided into two camps:

- The younger country music fan (except the Americana roots music fans), especially if he or she is younger than 30 years old, who is largely unfamiliar with the older country music sounds, especially from the 1980s and earlier; this demographic typically finds earlier pre-1960s "hillbilly" music (such as that by Hank Williams and Kitty Wells) and its unpolished, Appalachian influences over-the-top and unlistenable.
- The classic country fan, frequently over the age of 50, who—with a few exceptions—often dislikes country music produced after 1990, when the genre began incorporating more rock influence. Such fans often bemoan the electrification of popular country music with the addition of heavier guitars, Hard Rock influenced voices, and harder percussion (for example, the music of Brantley Gilbert and some of Jason Aldean's discography), and in more recent years even hip hop influences. Other complaints from this era include the increased cliché-driven songwriting ("Achy Breaky Heart" by Billy Ray Cyrus, one of the biggest country hits of the 1990s, was notorious in this respect, as was the fad of bro-country in the early 2010s) and, although pop/country crossover complaints have occurred since even the late 1940s with artists such as Eddy Arnold and Elvis Presley, the marketing of pop songs with little or even no country influence as "country" songs solely because the artists have previously performed country songs (something Billboard eventually confessed in 2019; modern examples of this include Taylor Swift and Carrie Underwood).

The 1990 dividing line coincided with a change in Billboard magazine's rules for what was then the Hot Country Singles record chart. Before 1990, it had operated under a variant of the methods used to produce the Hot 100; singles sales were combined with radio airplay to rank songs on the chart. In 1990, through an affiliation with Nielsen Broadcast Data Systems, Billboard dropped record sales from the formula, basing a song's ranking solely on spins on country radio, weighted by a station's listenership. (The formula reincorporated singles sales, both physical and digital, in 2012, but included airplay on non-country stations, thus giving pop-crossover singles a major advantage.) The 1990 change had quick effects: many musicians who had had consistent success on the chart through the late 1980s suddenly dropped out of the top 40 by 1991.

Although this 1990-era dividing line, to a certain extent, exists, it is not necessarily universal. "Classic" era country artists such as Kenny Rogers, Willie Nelson, and Dolly Parton continued producing hits well into the 2000s that received mainstream country radio airplay (sometimes in collaborations). Other artists from the era that did not continue to receive wider radio airplay after their heyday maintained strong cult followings from fans of all ages; an example of this is Johnny Cash, who remains in high regard many years after his 2003 death. Artists who began their careers in the 1980s, near the dividing line of the classic/modern divide, enjoy followings among both audiences; examples include George Strait and Reba McEntire, both of whom (as of 2014) are still active and performing hit songs. Neotraditional country, a style of country that arose in the 1980s, continues to produce hit songs and artists that draw from the sounds of the classic country era.

In part due to changing demographic pressures, "classic country" radio stations have begun adding 1990s music into their playlists since the late 2000s and phasing out music from the 1960s and earlier. Since the late 2010s, some classic country stations play country music from the 2000s, with 1970s music increasingly being de-emphasized. Some classic country stations have also been adding occasional 2010s music. Examples of this are KLBL in Malvern, Arkansas, WUSW in Buffalo, New York, and KMJX in Conway, Arkansas. Since the mid 2020s, a few classic country stations like WRKA in Louisville, Kentucky have also been phasing out 1980s music. This is not universal, as a few stations still emphasize the earlier, pre-1990s country cuts; WRVK in Mount Vernon, Kentucky, KKYX in San Antonio, Texas, WXRL in Buffalo, and WBZI in Xenia, Ohio being prominent examples.

== Syndicated radio programs ==
- The Country Oldies Show - Three-hour weekend show, also available stripped as hourlong daily shows, hosted by Steve Warren. Music aired from the 1950s through the 1980s.
- Pure American Country - Two-hour weekend show, also available stripped, hosted by Jim Ed Brown until his 2015 death and from then by Nashville radio personality Bill Cody until his own death in 2026. Music aired is from the 1940s to present.
- Country Gold - Four-hour weekend show hosted by Steve Harmon on Westwood One. Music aired is from the 1980s through the 2000s. Show traces its history to Westwood One's Country Gold Saturday Night, a live five-hour request show that launched in the early 1990s, although most of the series no longer resembles its original format. (The original format now airs as The Original Country Gold on Compass Media Networks, hosted by former Country Gold host Rowdy Yates, with a slightly older library going from the 1970s to 1990s.)
- Rick Jackson's Country Classics - Three-hour weekend show, hosted by Rick Jackson on United Stations Radio Networks.
- Country Flashback- Three-hour weekend show that debuted in 1991, hosted by Rich Renik from Starliner Media. Music aired is from the 1960s to 1990s.
- Retro Country USA - Two-hour weekend show, hosted by Big Steve Kelly. Music aired is from the 1970s to 2000s.
