= Grand Ole Opry Favorites =

Studio album by The Browns
- Released: 1964
- Recorded: October 7–8, 1963, RCA Victor Studio, Nashville, TN
- Genre: Country
- Label: RCA Victor
- Producer: Chet Atkins

The Browns chronology
This Young Land (1964)	Grand Ole Opry Favorites (1964)	I Heard the Bluebirds Sing (1965)

Professional ratings
Review scores
Source	Rating
Allmusic	3/5 stars

Grand Ole Opry Favorites is a 1964 album by American country music group the Browns. In 2000, this album and another album, Sweet Sounds by the Browns, were re-released together on the same compact disc.

== Track listing ==
=== Side one ===
1. "Don't Let the Stars Get in Your Eyes" (Slim Willet) – 2:20
2. "Sugarfoot Rag" (Hank Garland, Vaughn Horton) – 1:58
3. "Great Speckled Bird" (Guy Smith) – 2:36
4. "You Nearly Lose Your Mind" (Ernest Tubb) – 2:19
5. "Mansion on the Hill" (Hank Williams, Fred Rose) – 2:21
6. "Tragic Romance" (Louis M. Jones, Wiley Morris, Zeke Morris) – 2:48

=== Side two ===
1. "Fair and Tender Ladies" (Traditional) – 2:34
2. "The Rhumba Boogie" (Hank Snow) – 2:01
3. "Mommy, Please Stay Home With Me" (Eddy Arnold, Wally Fowler, Graydon J. Hall) – 3:04
4. "Looking Back to See" (Jim Ed Brown, Maxine Brown) – 2:18
5. "Four Walls" (Marvin Moore, George Campbell) – 3:06
6. "Wondering" (Joe Werner) – 2:25

== Personnel ==
- Jim Ed Brown – vocals
- Maxine Brown – vocals
- Bonnie Brown – vocals
- Jerry Reed – guitar
- Velma Smith – guitar
- Harold Morrison – dobro, banjo
- Henry Strzelecki – bass
- Kenneth Buttrey – drums
- Bill Pursell – piano
- Vocals by Anita Kerr, Priscilla Hubbard, Louis Nunley, Bill Wright, Glenn Baxter
