= Sweet Sounds by The Browns =

Sweet Sounds by the Browns

Studio album by The Browns
- Released: 1959
- Recorded: June, August 1959, RCA Victor Studio, Nashville, Tennessee
- Genre: Country
- Label: RCA Victor, LPM/LSP-2144
- Producer: Chet Atkins

The Browns chronology
Jim Edward, Maxine, and Bonnie Brown (1957)	Sweet Sounds by the Browns (1959)	Town and Country (1960)

Singles from Sweet Sounds by The Browns
- 1. "The Three Bells" Released: June 1959

Professional ratings
Review scores
Source	Rating
Allmusic	3/5 stars

Sweet Sounds by the Browns is an album by American country music trio, The Browns, released by RCA Victor in 1959. The album contains their number one hit single "The Three Bells". In 2000, this album and another RCA Victor album, Grand Ole Opry Favorites, were reissued together on one compact disc.

== Track listing ==
=== Side one ===
1. "The Three Bells" (Jean Villard, Marc Herrand, Bert Reisfeld) – 2:52
2. "Indian Love Call" (Rudolf Friml, Oscar Hammerstein, Otto Harbach) – 2:10
3. "Only the Lonely" – 2:10
4. "Dream On" – 1:51
5. "Blues Stay Away from Me" (Alton Delmore, Rabon Delmore) – 2:39
6. "Where Did the Sunshine Go" – 2:06

=== Side two ===
1. "Unchained Melody" (Alex North, Hy Zaret) – 2:30
2. "I Still Do" – 2:35
3. "Love Me Tender" (Vera Matson, Elvis Presley) – 2:28
4. "We Should Be Together" – 2:11
5. "Put on an Old Pair of Shoes" – 1:57
6. "Hi de Ank Tum" – 1:47

== Personnel ==
- Jim Ed Brown – vocals
- Maxine Brown – vocals
- Bonnie Brown – vocals
- Chet Atkins – guitar
- John D. Loudermilk – guitar
- Hank Garland – guitar
- Ray Edenton – guitar
- Bob Moore – bass
- Buddy Harman – drums
- Floyd Cramer – piano
- Background vocals by Anita Kerr, Dottie Dillard, Louis Nunley, Bill Wright
- Arranged and conducted by Chet Atkins
