= Jim Edward, Maxine, and Bonnie Brown =

Studio album by The Browns
- Released: 1957
- Genre: Country
- Label: RCA Victor
- Producer: Fabor Robinson, Chet Atkins

The Browns chronology
Jim Edward, Maxine, and Bonnie Brown (1957)	Sweet Sounds by the Browns (1959)

Professional ratings
Review scores
Source	Rating
Allmusic	4/5 stars

Jim Edward, Maxine, and Bonnie Brown is a 1957 album by the American country music trio The Browns.

== Track listing ==
1. "Looking Back to See"
2. "Draggin' Main Street"
3. "My Isle of Golden Dreams"
4. "I Guess I'm Crazy"
5. "Sky Princess"
6. "I'll Hold You in My Heart"
7. "How Can It Be Imagination"
8. "I Heard the Bluebirds Sing"
9. "Don't Use the World Lightly"
10. "Table Next to Me"
11. "You'll Always Be in My Heart"
12. "Just in Time"

== Personnel ==
- Jim Ed Brown – vocals
- Maxine Brown – vocals
- Bonnie Brown – vocals
