= The Three Bells (album) =

Compilation album by the Browns
- Released: 1993
- Recorded: March 15, 1954 – February 10, 1967
- Genre: Country, gospel
- Label: Bear Family
- Producer: Chet Atkins and various others

The Browns chronology
Looking Back to See (1986)	The Three Bells (1993)	Family Bible (1996)

Professional ratings
Review scores
Source	Rating
AllMusic	4.5/5 stars

The Three Bells is a compilation album by American country music group, the Browns, released in 1993.

This compilation box set release contains eight CDs with 258 songs covering the career of the Browns. Each CD covers a different era of their work, both prior to and after their years with RCA Victor and producer Chet Atkins.

== Personnel ==
- Jim Ed Brown – vocals
- Maxine Brown – vocals
- Bonnie Brown – vocals
