= Browns Sing the Big Ones from Country =

Studio album by The Browns
- Released: 1967
- Recorded: February 10, 1967, RCA Victor Studio, Nashville, TN
- Genre: Country
- Label: RCA Camden
- Producer: Chet Atkins

The Browns chronology
| Our Kind of Country (1966) | Browns Sing the Big Ones from Country (1967) | The Old Country Church (1967) |

Professional ratings
Review scores
| Source | Rating |
|---|---|
| Allmusic | link |

Browns Sing the Big Ones from Country is an album by American Country music group, the Browns, released in 1967 on the RCA Camden label. The trio took on a number of country hits at a time when listeners often preferred to hear the latest songs by their favorite singers and groups.

== Track listing ==
1. "Where Does the Good Times Go" (Buck Owens)
2. "All of Me Belongs to You" (Merle Haggard)
3. "Ride Ride Ride" (Liz Anderson)
4. "Once" (Ted Harris)
5. "Happy Tracks" (Ray Pennington)
6. "Walk Through This World With Me" (Sandy Seamons, Kaye Savage)
7. "Country Boy's Dream" (Ernie Newton)
8. "If the Whole World Stopped Lovin'" (Ben Peters)
9. "I'm a Lonesome Fugitive" (Liz Anderson, Casey Anderson)
10. "Misty Blue" (Bob Montgomery)

== Personnel ==
- Jim Ed Brown – vocals
- Maxine Brown – vocals
- Bonnie Brown – vocals
- Jerry Reed – guitar
- Wayne Moss – guitar
- Chip Young – guitar
- Ray Edenton – guitar
- Weldon Myrick – pedal steel guitar
- Roy Huskey – bass
- Jerry Carrigan – drums
- David Briggs – piano
