= Family Bible (The Browns album) =

Studio album by The Browns
- Released: March 12, 1996
- Genre: Country, gospel
- Label: Rock Bottom

The Browns chronology
The Three Bells (1993)	Family Bible (1996)	The Complete Hits (2008)

Professional ratings
Review scores
Source	Rating
AllMusic	2/5 stars

Family Bible is an album by American country music group, the Browns, released in 1996. This release contains all new recordings by the original trio.

== Track listing ==
1. "Amazing Grace" (Newton, Walker) — 2:46
2. "Uncloudy Day" (Kelly) — 2:44
3. "Mansion over the Hilltop" (Stanphill) — 2:55
4. "I'll Fly Away" (Brumley) — 2:19
5. "Family Bible" (Breeland, Buskirk, Gray) — 3:03
6. "He'll Set Your Fields on Fire" (Ballen, Brackett) — 2:39
7. "Life's Railway to Heaven" (Abbey, Tilman) — 2:30
8. "I'll Meet You in the Morning" (Brumley) — 2:29
9. "The Family Who Prays" (Ira Louvin, Charlie Louvin) — 2:23
10. "How Great Thou Art" (Boberg) — 2:45

== Personnel ==
- Jim Ed Brown — vocals
- Maxine Brown — vocals
- Bonnie Brown — vocals
