= St. Christopher Truckers Relief Fund =

American charity

- St. Christopher Truckers Relief Fund
- Formation: 2007
- Type: Nonprofit 501(C)(3) Corporation
- Purpose: Save Lives and Families, One Driver at a Time
- Headquarters: Knoxville, TN
- Key people: Joyce Brenny (Board President) Tim Ridley, Ph.D. (Board Vice-President) Donna Kennedy (Executive Director)
- Website: https://truckersfund.org/

St. Christopher Truckers Relief Fund (SCF) is a 501(c)(3) charity that assists professional over-the-road semi-truck drivers and their families when an illness or injury has led to an inability to work. The SCF also provides health and wellness programs targeted to these drivers.

As of June 22, 2021, SCF has helped 3,209 drivers and their families. According to Charity Navigator, SCF allocates 95.8 percent of its revenue to program expenses.

== History ==
St. Christopher Truckers Relief Fund was founded in 2007 by Dr. John McElligott, Dave Nemo, an American radio personality who hosts a show on Road Dog Trucking on Sirius XM Radio, and Michael Burns.

Sixty-one percent of long-haul truckers report having two or more of the following risk factors: hypertension, obesity, smoking, high cholesterol, no physical activity, 6 or fewer hours of sleep per 24-hr period. Making things worse, thirty-eight percent of truck drivers are not covered by health insurance or a health care plan.

Drivers, who experience an injury or illness, may be at risk of losing their commercial drivers license and become unable to work, which may lead to financial hardship.

== Health and Wellness Programs ==
=== Rigs Without Cigs ===
The St. Christopher Truckers Relief Fund launched the “Rigs Without Cigs” tobacco cessation campaign in 2017. The program is aimed to help truckers quit smoking, dipping and chewing tobacco to improve their health.

=== Driving Down Diabetes ===
The St. Christopher Truckers Relief Fund offers a diabetes prevention program for truck drivers. A year long program focusing on nutrition, exercise, stress management, and more. The program is CDC approved.

== Highway to Hope ==
The St. Christopher Truckers Relief Fund hosted country music singer Wynonna Judd as headliner of SCF's first-ever virtual “Highway to Hope” benefit concert on May 16, 2021. Country music artists: John Schneider, Billy Dean, Lindsay Lawler and Heath Sanders, who have been supportive of the organization and trucking in general, joined Judd for the livestream concert.

The St. Christopher Truckers Relief Fund announced that the virtual benefit concert raised more than $75,000 to support drivers in need.

== Donations and Spending ==
By 2019, SCF had given over $3 million in financial assistance on behalf of professional drivers in need.
