= Pure American Country =

Radio show based in Nashville, Tennessee

The Pure American Country Radio Show is a syndicated radio program recorded in Nashville, Tennessee. The show began in 2003 and covers the United States with 174 affiliate stations as of 2026. The program has its origins in the Country Music Greats Radio Show, which was hosted by Grand Ole Opry legend Jim Ed Brown from its inception until shortly before his death in 2015. Since Brown's death, Bill Cody has hosted the now-rebranded program until his own death in 2026, and after Cody's demise, Zack Bennett was named the host. Brown’s 50 plus years in the music business provided inside knowledge and first-hand accounts of the legends of country music.

== Format ==
The Country Music Greats Radio Show is a weekly program that consists of two one-hour segments dedicated to the particular artist or theme of the week. In addition to the weekly one-hour programs, the Country Music Greats Radio Show features the daily Country Music Greats Radio Minute vignette.

Music on the show spans from the 1940s through the present day, with songs from the 2000s and 2010s mostly consisting of neotraditional country recordings dubbed "future classics" and new songs by classic country artists from the 1990s and earlier that may not receive airplay on mainstream or hot country stations.

The show also contains thousands of hours of archival interview tapes, which provides content for the show. The Country Music Greats Radio Show also frequently features new interviews conducted by Jim Ed Brown. Artists who have interviewed with the show include Charley Pride, Bill Anderson, Charlie Louvin, Steve Wariner, Lynn Anderson, David Frizzell, Claude King, and Randy Travis. Toward the end of his life, Brown had shifted to more contemporary and alternative country and Americana acts for interviews; the last two interviews posted on the show's Web site featured Robert Earl Keen and Will Hoge.

The "Pure American" name is part of a naming rights agreement with Pure American Insurance.

== Host ==
James Edward Brown's career as a country singer has lasted since the 1950s and evolved successfully as a trio, solo, and as a duet artist. He found stardom in the late 1950s as part The Browns, which consisted of Jim Ed and his sister’s Maxine and Bonnie. The Browns’ hit "The Three Bells" holds the distinction of being the first song to ever simultaneously sit in the number one spot for the country, pop and the R+B charts. After the success of The Browns, Jim Ed went solo in the 1960s and continued to record hits such as "Pop a Top" and "Morning". Starting in the mid-1970s Brown began finding himself at the top of the charts with his duet partner, Helen Cornelius. Brown's career would continue to expand as he became the host for several successful television shows such as The Country Place, Nashville On the Road, Going Our Way, and You Can Be A Star.

Bill Cody was a disc jockey at WSM, flagship station of the Grand Ole Opry. Prior to hosting the Pure American Country Radio Show, Cody had hosted Classic Country Weekend, another syndicated show that had aired on classic country stations. Cody died on June 9, 2026 of kidney and heart failure at the age of 67.

Zack Bennett had joined the program as its producer in 2024. As Cody's illness progressed, he increasingly filled in on new episodes of the program and became its interim host upon Cody's death. Bennett was named permanent host in September 2026.
