= Fred Imus =

American radio talk show host (1942–2011)

- Born: Frederic Moore Imus; January 11, 1942; Los Angeles, California, U.S.
- Died: August 6, 2011 (aged 69); Tucson, Arizona, U.S.
- Occupations: Radio talk show host, songwriter

Frederic Moore Imus (January 11, 1942 – August 6, 2011) was an American radio talk show host and the younger brother of radio talk show host Don Imus. He hosted Trailer Park Bash, a weekly country music program launched on May 6, 2006, on Saturdays from 6 a.m. to 10 a.m. ET on Sirius XM Radio's Outlaw Country channel lasting five years until his death in 2011. His sidekick was former western actor Don Collier. Imus broadcast his show from his trailer in Tucson, Arizona. He frequently appeared as a regular guest on his brother's Imus in the Morning.

== Career ==
He attended Kent State University and served in the United States Army's 101st Airborne Division. Imus also restored cars, especially 1957 Chevrolets and worked as a brakeman for Southern Pacific. In 1963, before Don went into radio, he and Fred wrote and recorded a song called I'm A Hot Rodder (And All That Jazz) for the Challenge label under the name Jay Jay Imus and Freddy Ford.

While with Southern Pacific Railroad, he met fellow brakeman Phil Sweet, and in 1976 the two wrote the No. 1 country hit for Jim Ed Brown and Helen Cornelius, I Don't Want to Have to Marry You, which was also voted "Song of the Year" by Music City News in 1977. Imus has been an on-air host at country music stations in Cleveland, Ohio, Cheyenne, Wyoming and El Paso, Texas, among others.

Because of his love of classic cars, Fred opened his own auto body shop in El Paso, Texas and with the idea from his brother Don Imus, he also sold a few shirts and hats out of his body shop with a simple mention from Don on his radio show. The store was called the Autobody Express, co-owned by Don and Fred. The Autobody Express was later moved to Santa Fe, New Mexico. Later, they had a store inside the Mohegan Sun Native American Casino in Uncasville, Connecticut. The company failed in 2003 and both stores closed.

From 2004-2005, he co-hosted Out West with Fred Imus and Nicole Cox, an afternoon talk show, on KJLL-AM in Tucson.

== Death ==
Fred Imus was found dead at his home in Tucson, Arizona, August 6, 2011 by Don Collier when he arrived to do Imus' weekly radio show. He died in his sleep peacefully, according to Matthew Hiltzik, a spokesman for Don Imus.

== Books ==
- Don Imus and Fred Imus, Two Guys Four Corners: Great Photographs, Great Times, and a Million Laughs. Villard, 1997. (ISBN 0-679-45307-5).
- Fred Imus and Mike Lupica, The Fred Book. Doubleday, 1998. (ISBN 0-385-47652-3).
