= I Don't Want to Have to Marry You =

Single by Jim Ed Brown and Helen Cornelius

from the album I Don't Want to Have to Marry You
- B-side: "Have I Told You Lately that I Love You?"
- Released: July 1976
- Genre: Country
- Length: 3:02
- Label: RCA Victor
- Songwriters: Fred Imus; Phil Sweet
- Producer: Bob Ferguson

Jim Ed Brown and Helen Cornelius singles chronology
"I Don't Want to Have to Marry You" (1976)	"Saying Hello, Saying I Love You, Saying Goodbye" (1976)

"I Don't Want to Have to Marry You" is a song written by Fred Imus and Phil Sweet, and recorded by American country music duo Jim Ed Brown and Helen Cornelius.

It was released in July 1976 as the first single and title track from the album I Don't Want to Have to Marry You. For Cornelius, It was the most successful single of her career. For Brown, it came second in success to his 1959 recording, "The Three Bells;" the number one country and pop single recorded with his sisters, Maxine and Bonnie Brown. "I Don't Want to Have to Marry You" stayed at number one for two weeks and spent a total of ten weeks on the country chart.

== Chart performance ==
Chart (1976)	Peak position
U.S. Billboard Hot Country Singles	1
Canadian RPM Country Tracks	7
