= Family Bible =

Family Bible may refer to:

- Family Bible (book), a Bible handed down through a family
- Family Bible (Willie Nelson album), 1980
- "Family Bible" (song), a song written by Willie Nelson
- Family Bible (The Browns album), 1996
- The Family Bible, Ernest Tubb album, 1963
