= Jerry Clower =

American comedian and author (1926–1998)

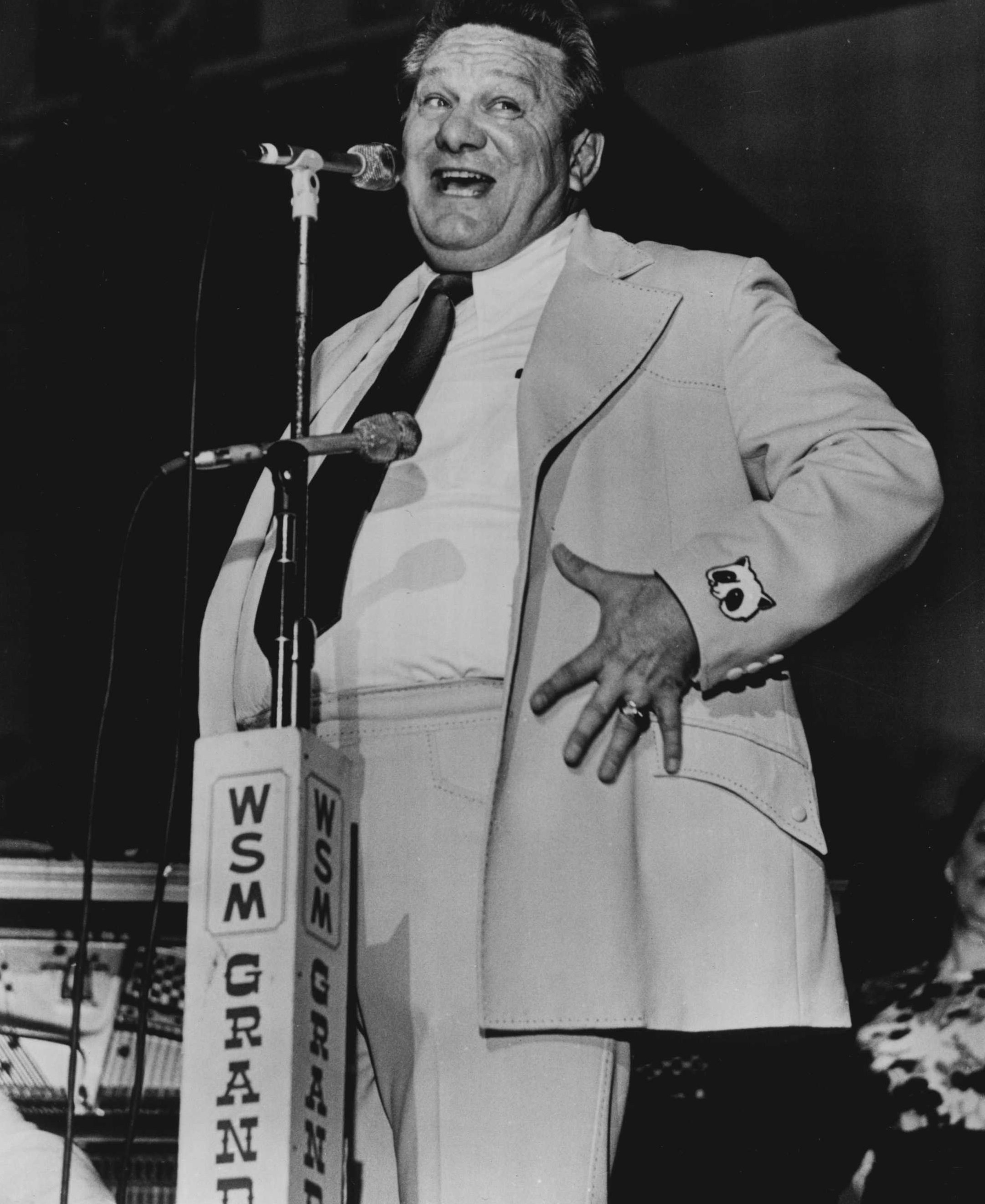
- Clower at the Grand Ole Opry in 1974
- Born: Howard Gerald Clower; September 28, 1926; Liberty, Mississippi, U.S.
- Died: August 24, 1998 (aged 71); Jackson, Mississippi, U.S.
- Other name: "The Mouth of Mississippi"
- Education: Mississippi State University
- Spouse: Doris Homerline Wells (1947–1998; his death)

Comedy career
- Years active: 1954–1998
- Medium: Stand-up, television, audio recordings
- Military career
- Allegiance: United States
- Branch: United States Navy
- Service years: 1944–1946
- Rank: Radioman Third Class (RMN3)
- Awards: American Campaign Medal; Asiatic-Pacific Campaign Medal (with 2 bronze service stars); World War II Victory Medal

Howard Gerald Clower (September 28, 1926 – August 24, 1998) was an American stand-up comedian. Born and raised in the state of Mississippi, Clower was best known for his stories of the rural South and was given the nickname "The Mouth of Mississippi".

== Life ==
Clower was born in Liberty, Mississippi, and began a two-year stint in the U.S. Navy after graduating from high school in 1944. Upon his discharge, in 1946, he was a Radioman Third Class (RMN3) and had earned the American Campaign Medal, the Asiatic-Pacific Campaign Medal (with two bronze service stars), and the World War II Victory Medal.

He studied agriculture at Mississippi State University, where he played college football and was a member of Phi Kappa Tau fraternity. After finishing school in 1951, Clower worked as a county agent and later as a seed salesman. He became a fertilizer salesman for Mississippi Chemical in 1954.

== Career ==
By 1954, Clower had developed a reputation for telling funny stories to boost his sales. Tapes of Clower's speaking engagements wound up in the hands of Edwin "Big Ed" Wilkes and Bud Andrews in Lubbock, Texas, who had him make a better-quality recording which they promoted. MCA Records later awarded The Coon Hunt a platinum record for sales in excess of $1 million at the retail level.

At first, Clower took orders at his speaking engagements, selling 8000 copies on the Lemon record label. In time, Wilkes sent a copy to Grant Turner at WSM radio in Nashville, and when Turner played it on the air, Clower said "that thing busted loose." MCA was soon knocking on Clower's door, offering him a contract. Once MCA began distribution in 1971, Jerry Clower from Yazoo City, Mississippi Talkin' retailed more than a million dollars over 10 months and stayed in the top 20 on the country charts for 30 weeks.

Clower's first on-stage engagement occurred in the early 1970s when country radio station owner and show promoter, Marshall Rowland (WQIK, Jacksonville; WDEN, Macon; WQYK, Tampa), received an early Clower recording ("The Coon Huntin' Story") which was met with rave reviews by his station's listeners in Jacksonville. Rowland contacted Clower and offered him an airplane ticket and a few hundred dollars to come open for an upcoming tour Rowland had booked with Charley Pride. Clower arrived back-stage for the Saturday night show at the Jacksonville Coliseum, but Pride's manager Jack Johnson refused to allow it because Clower was non-union. Rowland averted the situation by putting Clower on stage while the lights were up and people were still entering the Coliseum. Clower performed for about 30 minutes. Pride, who watched from backstage, is said to have then taken Clower under his wing and introduced him at the next of Rowland's shows as his "new friend." Clower and Rowland remained very close friends for the years that followed, connecting for events, and working shows together. Clower was a frequent face at Rowland's radio stations over the remaining years of his life, and the music was known to be interrupted with Clower's comedy recordings from time to time, especially at WQIK in Jacksonville, where his career can be said to have been launched in earnest.

His stories often featured the Ledbetters, a quintessential Southern, country folk. Clower made 27 full-length recordings in his 27-year career as a professional entertainer (not counting "best of" compilations). With one exception, all the recordings were released by MCA. The exception was Ain't God Good, which Clower recorded with MCA's blessing at a worship service. Word Records promoted and distributed this title in 1977. This recording gave Clower, always a staunch Christian, an opportunity to present his personal testimony in a comfortable church setting. Clower was well known for his faith and often made references to God in his stories. He spoke at many Southern Baptist Convention events. He said his faith kept him happy and able to make others laugh.

In 1973, Clower became a member of the Grand Ole Opry, and continued to perform there regularly until his death. He also co-hosted a radio show called Country Crossroads with Bill Mack and Leroy Van Dyke, which has aired in syndication for 40 years and a television version of the program was produced, as well, starting in 1993. Clower's involvement began in 1973 and lasted well over 20 years. This show was produced and distributed by the Southern Baptist Convention.

Clower also taped segments of Nashville On the Road, which included comedic performances and interviews with other country artists featured on the show. Jim Ed Brown hosted the series with Clower during the program's first season, 1975–76, and they were joined by Helen Cornelius in 1976. Their involvement in the series lasted until 1981. The show continued to air with new host Jim Stafford through 1983. Clower's last album was Peaches and Possums, released posthumously in October 1998. He was the author of four books. The book Ain't God Good became the basis for an inspirational documentary film of the same title that won an award from the New York International Independent Film and Video Festival. His other three books include 1978's Let the Hammer Down; 1987's Life Everlaughter, and 1993's Stories From Home.

== Death ==
Clower died in August 1998 following heart bypass surgery; he was 71 years old. He had been married to Homerline (née Wells) Clower (1926–2018) since August 1947. He had a son, Ray (1953–2011), and three daughters.

== Discography ==
Year	Album	Chart positions			RIAA	Label
Year	Album	U.S. Country	U.S. Comedy	Billboard Top 200	RIAA	Label
1971	From Yazoo City – Mississippi Talkin'	19			Gold	Decca
1972	The Mouth of Mississippi				Gold	Decca
1973	Clower Power	7				MCA
1974	Country Ham	12				MCA
1975	Live in Picayune	8				MCA
1976	The Ambassador of Goodwill	40				MCA
1977	On the Road					MCA
1977	Ain't God Good!!					Word Records
1978	Live from the Stage of the Grand Ole Opry!	50				MCA
1979	Greatest Hits			189	Gold	MCA
1980	Ledbetter Olympics					MCA
1981	More Good 'Uns	43				MCA
1982	Dogs I Have Known					MCA
1983	Live at Cleburne, Texas					MCA
1984	Starke Raving!					MCA
1985	An Officer and a Ledbetter					MCA
1985	The Best of Jerry Clower					MCA
1986	Runaway Truck					MCA
1987	Top Gum					MCA
1988	Classic Clower					MCA
1989	Let There Be Light					MCA
1990	The Mouth of the Mighty Mississip'					MCA
1991	Racoonteur					MCA
1992	Sidewinder					MCA
1993	Stories Told Funny					MCA
1994	Jerry Joins the Navy					MCA
1995	Fish'n, Frogs, Hawgs, and Dawgs					MCA
1997	Live at Dollywood					MCA
1998	Peaches and Possums {final album}					MCA
1999	Great Moments with Jerry Clower					MCA
1999	Legendary Clower					MCA
1999	More Clower Power					MCA
2005	The Jerry Clower Collection					Madacy Records
2006	Classic Clower Power	52	3			MCA Nashville
2008	Collectors Edition Box Set					Madacy Special Markets
