= Dave Nemo =

American radio personality

Dave Nemo is an American radio personality who formerly hosted a show on Road Dog Trucking on Sirius XM Radio. Nemo's show is geared toward entertainment and news favored by truck drivers. As of today his show is no longer on SiriusXM's channel 146 and is now streaming on platforms such as iHeart Radio, RadioNemo.com, YouTube Live, Facebook Live, and many other different platforms. All of the shows and segments are then available to stream on-demand on all major podcasting platforms.

Before his stint with XM, Nemo was best known as the host of The Road Gang, the overnight truckers' show broadcast for many years from WWL (AM) Radio in New Orleans and heard throughout most of the country through its clear channel signal. Nemo was originally the show's weekend and fill-in host behind Charlie Douglas, then took over the top spot on the show when Douglas left. Big John Parker then took Nemo's spot as weekend host.

Nemo joined Road Dog (then Open Road) at its inception. His show is aired daily from 7:00 a.m. to 11:00 a.m. EST. Two of his biggest overnight competitors during his Road Gang days, Bill Mack and Dale "The Truckin' Bozo" Sommers, also joined the channel.

Nemo's show while with SiriusXM, were broadcast from studios in Nashville, where guests from the country music industry often stop by.
