= Lying In Love with You =

Single by Jim Ed Brown and Helen Cornelius

from the album You Don't Bring Me Flowers
- B-side: "Let's Take the Long Way Around the World"
- Released: March 1979
- Genre: Country
- Length: 2:47
- Label: RCA Victor
- Songwriters: Dean Rutherford; Gary Harrison
- Producer: Tom Collins

Jim Ed Brown and Helen Cornelius singles chronology
"You Don't Bring Me Flowers" (1978)	"Lying In Love with You" (1979)	"Fools" (1979)

"Lying In Love with You" is a song written by Dean Dillon (under the writing name Dean Rutherford) and Gary Harrison and recorded by American country music artists Jim Ed Brown and Helen Cornelius. It was released in March 1979 as the third and last single from the album You Don't Bring Me Flowers. The song went to number 2 on the Billboard Hot Country Singles chart, while going to number 3 in Canada.

== Content ==
The song is a duet about a husband who calls in sick to work just to spend the day "lying in love" in bed with his wife.

== Critical reception ==
A review on Billboard called the song "an uptempo offering driven with powerful drum lines, piano, guitars and harmonica highlights."

A review on Cash Box praised the song for its "catchy rhythm tracks and smooth production."

== Charts ==
Chart (1979)	Peak position
U.S. Billboard Hot Country Singles	2
Canadian RPM Country Tracks	3

=== Year-end charts ===
Chart (1979)	Position
US Hot Country Singles (Billboard)	48
