= The Browns =

American country-folk vocal trio

- Bonnie and Jim Ed (top) with Maxine in the late 1950s

Background information
- Origin: Sparkman, Arkansas, United States
- Genres: country, folk, gospel, traditional pop
- Years active: 1954–1968
- Label: RCA Victor
- Past members: Jim Ed Brown; Maxine Brown; Bonnie Brown

The Browns were an American country and folk music vocal trio best known for their 1959 Grammy-nominated hit, "The Three Bells". The group, composed of Jim Ed Brown and his sisters Maxine and Bonnie, had a close, smooth harmony characteristic of the Nashville sound, though their music also combined elements of folk and pop. They disbanded in 1967 and were elected to the Country Music Hall of Fame in March 2015.

== History ==
James Edward, older sister Maxine, and younger sister Bonnie Brown sang individually in Pine Bluff, Arkansas, until 1954, when Maxine and Jim Ed signed a record contract as a singing duo. They earned national recognition and a guest spot on Ernest Tubb's radio show for their self-penned song "Looking Back to See", which hit the top 10 and stayed on the charts through the summer of 1954. The song would be a hit again nearly 20 years later for Buck Owens and Susan Raye in 1972.

They were joined in 1955 by then-recent high school graduate, 18-year-old Bonnie, and began performing on Louisiana Hayride in Shreveport, Louisiana. By the end of 1955, the trio was appearing on KWTO in Springfield, Missouri, and had another top-10 hit with "Here Today and Gone Tomorrow", which got a boost by their appearances on ABC-TV's Ozark Jubilee, which Maxine Brown called "our real breakthrough." Jim Ed and Maxine had first appeared on the show as a duo in 1955. Producer Si Siman signed them with RCA Victor in 1956, and soon they had two major hits, "I Take the Chance" (a cover of a Louvin Brothers composition that showed the Browns' close harmony) and "I Heard the Bluebirds Sing". When Jim Ed was drafted in 1957, the group continued to record while he was on leave, and sister Norma filled in for him on tours, as did Billy Walker.

In 1959, The Browns scored their biggest hit when their folk-pop single "The Three Bells" reached number one on the Billboard Hot 100 pop and country charts. The song also peaked at number 10 on Billboard's Rhythm and Blues listing. Based on a song called "Les trois cloches", it was originally a hit in France for Édith Piaf. The Browns' version told the story of a character named Jimmy Brown, a coincidence rather than a reference to Jim Ed Brown. It sold over one million copies and earned Grammy Award nominations for Record of the Year and Best Group or Vocal Performance. In 1960, their version of "Blue Christmas" reached No. 97 on the Billboard Hot 100 December singles chart.

The Browns appeared on The Ed Sullivan Show and American Bandstand, and followed up with "Scarlet Ribbons (For Her Hair)" and "The Old Lamplighter", recordings that also did well on both the pop and country charts. With an international following, they toured Europe extensively and saw further moderate success on the country music charts. In 1963, they joined the Grand Ole Opry.

Jim Ed began recording as a solo artist for RCA Victor in 1965, and these efforts quickly began overshadowing the trio's recordings. Maxine sang lead vocal on the group's final singles released in 1968, "Big Daddy" and "I Will Bring You Water," with Jim Ed only supplying background vocals. The trio officially disbanded that year and Maxine signed with Chart Records in 1969, resulting in a small hit with "Sugar Cane County".

In the 1980s, The Browns began performing occasionally in concert for the first time in nearly 20 years and recorded a new album titled Jim Ed Brown & The Browns in 1986, which failed to chart. In 1996, they recorded a new collection of gospel songs titled Family Bible. In 2006, the trio performed "The Old Lamplighter" and "The Three Bells" for the PBS special, Country Pop Legends.

On June 11, 2015, Jim Ed Brown died from lung cancer at age 81. On July 16, 2016, Bonnie Brown also died from lung cancer at the age of 77. Maxine Brown died on January 21, 2019, at the age of 87 from complications of heart and kidney disease.

The Browns were honored with the Lifetime Achievement Award during the inaugural Arkansas Country Music Awards on June 3, 2018, alongside fellow Arkansas natives Johnny Cash, Glen Campbell, Ed Bruce, and Wayne Raney. The event was held at the Center for Performing Arts at the University of Arkansas at Little Rock.

== Discography ==
=== Albums ===
Year	Album	US Country	Label
1957	Jim Edward, Maxine, and Bonnie Brown		RCA Victor
1959	Sweet Sounds by the Browns		RCA Victor
1960	Town & Country		RCA Victor
1960	The Browns Sing Their Hits		RCA Victor
1961	Our Favorite Folk Songs		RCA Victor
1961	The Little Brown Church Hymnal		RCA Victor
1963	Grand Ole Opry Favorites		RCA Victor
1964	This Young Land		RCA Victor
1965	Three Shades of Brown		RCA Victor
1965	I Heard the Bluebirds Sing		RCA Victor
1965	When Love Is Gone	18	RCA Victor
1966	Alone with You		RCA Victor
1966	Our Kind of Country	25	RCA Victor
1966	The Best of The Browns		RCA Victor
1967	The Old Country Church		RCA Victor
1967	Browns Sing the Big Ones from Country		RCA Victor
1968	A Harvest of Country Songs		RCA Camden
1984	Rockin' Rollin' Browns		Bear Family
1985	20 of the Best		RCA Victor
1986	Jim Ed Brown & The Browns		MCA
1986	Looking Back to See		Bear Family
1993	The Three Bells		Bear Family
1996	Family Bible		Rock Bottom
2008	The Complete Hits		Collector's Choice

=== Singles ===
Year	Single (A-side, B-side) Both sides from same album except where indicated	Chart Positions				Album
Year	Single (A-side, B-side) Both sides from same album except where indicated	US Country	US	CB Country	CB Pop	Album
1954	"Looking Back To See" b/w "Rio De Janeiro" (Non-album track)	8				Jim Edward, Maxine, and Bonnie Brown
1954	"Why Am I Falling" b/w "Itsy Witsy Bitsy Me"					Non-album tracks
1955	"Draggin' Main Street" b/w "Your Love Is Wild As The West Wind" (Non-album track)					Jim Edward, Maxine, and Bonnie Brown
1955	"Do Memories Haunt You" b/w "Jungle Magic"					Non-album tracks
1955	"Here Today and Gone Tomorrow" b/w "You Thought I Thought"	7				Non-album tracks
1956	"I Take The Chance" b/w "Goo Goo Dada" (Non-album track)	2				Three Shades Of Brown
1956	"Just As Long As You Love Me" b/w "Don't Tell Me Your Troubles"	11				Non-album tracks
1956	"A Man With A Plan" b/w "Just-A-Lot-Of Sweet Talk"					Non-album tracks
1957	"Money" b/w "It Takes A Long Long Train With A Red Caboose"	15				Non-album tracks
1957	"Getting Used To Being Lonely" b/w "I'm In Heaven"					Non-album tracks
1957	"I Heard The Bluebirds Sing" b/w "The Last Thing I Want" (Non-album track)	4		20		Jim Edward, Maxine, and Bonnie Brown
1957	"True Love Goes For Beyond" b/w "The Man In The Moon"					Non-album tracks
1958	"Crazy Dreams" b/w "Ain't No Way In The World"					Non-album tracks
1958	"Would You Care" b/w "The Trot"	13		14		Non-album tracks
1959	"Beyond The Shadow" b/w "This Time I Would Know" (from I Heard The Bluebirds Sing)	11		14		Non-album tracks
1959	"The Three Bells" b/w "Heaven Fell Last Night" (Non-album track)	1	1	1	1	Sweet Sounds By The Browns
1959	"Scarlet Ribbons (For Her Hair)" b/w "Blue Bells Ring" (Non-album track)	7	13	5	17	Town & Country
1960	"The Old Lamplighter" /	20	5	12	8	Town & Country
1960	"Teen-Ex"		47		114	Non-album track
1960	"Lonely Little Robin" /		105	39	78	The Browns Sing Their Hits
1960	"Margo (The Ninth of May)"			35	89	The Browns Sing Their Hits
1960	"Whiffenpoof Song" /		112		tag	The Browns Sing Their Hits
1960	"Brighten the Corner Where You Are"				114	The Browns Sing Their Hits
1960	"Send Me the Pillow You Dream On" b/w "You're So Much A Part Of Me" (Non-album track)	23	56	21	50	I Heard The Bluebirds Sing
1960	"Blue Christmas" b/w "Greenwillow Christmas"		97			Non-album tracks
1961	"Ground Hog" /		97			Our Favorite Folk Songs
1961	"Angel's Dolly"			41		Non-album track
1961	"My Baby's Gone" b/w "Whispering Wine" (Non-album track)					I Heard The Bluebirds Sing
1961	"Alpha And Omega" b/w "Foolish Pride"					I Heard The Bluebirds Sing
1962	"Buttons And Bows" b/w "Remember Me"		104			I Heard The Bluebirds Sing
1962	"The Old Master Painter" b/w "It's Just A Little Heartache"		118			Non-album tracks
1963	"The Twelfth Rose" b/w "Watching My World Fall Apart"			40		Non-album tracks
1964	"Oh No!" b/w "Dear Teresa"	42		49		I Heard The Bluebirds Sing
1964	"Then I'll Stop Loving You" b/w "I Know My Place" (Non-album track)	12		20		The Best Of The Browns
1964	"Everybody's Darlin', Plus Mine" b/w "The Outskirts Of Town"	40	135	16		Non-album tracks
1965	"I Feel Like Crying" b/w "No Sad Songs For Me"					Non-album tracks
1965	"You Can't Grow Peaches From A Cherry Tree"^{A} b/w "A Little Too Much To Dream" (Non-album track)		120	21	134	The Best Of The Browns
1966	"Meadowgreen" b/w "One Take Away One"	46		30		Non-album tracks
1966	"I'd Just Be Fool Enough" b/w "Springtime"	16		29		Our Kind Of Country
1966	"Coming Back To You" b/w "Gigawackem" (from Our Kind Of Country)	19		17		Non-album tracks
1967	"I Hear It Now" b/w "He Will Set Your Fields On Fire" (from The Old Country Church)	54		55		Non-album tracks
1968	"Big Daddy" /	52		55		Non-album tracks
1968	"I Will Bring You Water"	64				Non-album tracks

- ^{A}Also peaked at No. 35 on Adult Contemporary chart.
