= I'll Never Be Free =

Single by Kay Starr and Tennessee Ernie Ford
- A-side: "Ain't Nobody's Business But My Own"
- Released: July 1950
- Genre: Country
- Length: 2:38
- Label: Capitol
- Songwriters: Bennie Benjamin, George Weiss

Kay Starr singles chronology
"Bonaparte's Retreat" (1950)	"I'll Never Be Free" (1950)	"Mama Goes Where Papa Goes (Or Papa Don't Go Out Tonight)" (1950)

Tennessee Ernie Ford singles chronology
"The Cry of the Wild Goose" (1950)	"I'll Never Be Free" (1950)	"Cincinnati Dancing Pig" (1950)

"I'll Never Be Free" is a song written by Bennie Benjamin and George Weiss and performed by Kay Starr and Tennessee Ernie Ford. It reached No. 2 on the U.S. country chart and No. 3 on the U.S. pop chart in 1950.

== Other charting versions ==
- Louis Jordan and Ella Fitzgerald released a version of the song which reached No. 7 on the U.S. R&B chart in 1950.
- Annie Laurie and Paul Gayten and His Orchestra released a version of the song which reached No. 4 on the U.S. R&B chart in 1950.
- Dinah Washington released a version of the song which reached No. 3 on the U.S. R&B chart in 1950.
- Lucky Millinder and His Orchestra released a version of the song which reached No. 8 on the U.S. R&B chart in 1951.
- LaVern Baker and Jimmy Ricks released a version of the song which reached No. 103 on the U.S. pop chart in 1961.
- Starr re-released a version of the song as a solo sing which reached No. 94 on the U.S. pop chart in 1961.
- Johnny and Jonie Mosby released a version of the song as a single in 1969 which No. 26 on the U.S. country chart.
- Jim Ed Brown and Helen Cornelius released a version of the song as a single in 1978 which reached No. 11 on the U.S. country chart.

== Other versions ==
- The Skylarks released a version of the song as a single in 1950, but it did not chart.
- Janis Martin released a version of the song as the B-side to her 1957 single "Love and Kisses".
- Johnnie Ray released a version of the song on his 1957 EP The Big Beat.
- Lillie Bryant released a version of the song as the B-side to her 1959 single "Smoky Gray Eyes (Stroll Smoky)".
- Chris Connor released a version of the song on her 1959 EP Pop Goes Chris in Witchcraft.
- Joanie Sommers released a version of the song as the B-side to her 1960 single "One Boy".
- Roy Hamilton released a version of the song as a single in 1961, but it did not chart.
- Jimmy Norman released a version of the song as a single in 1961, but it did not chart.
- Kelly Gordon released a version of the song as the B-side to his 1963 single "A Phonograph Record".
- Pat Boone and Shirley Boone released a version of the song as the B-side to their 1964 single "Side by Side".
- Mel Carter released a version of the song as the B-side to his 1964 single "The Richest Man Alive".
- Bill Pursell released a version of the song as a single in 1964, but it did not chart.
- Van Morrison released a duet version of the song (with daughter Shana Morrison) in 1995 as part of the Days Like This album.
