= United Stations Radio Networks =

American radio syndicator

- Industry: Radio syndication
- Founded: February 1994
- Founders: Dick Clark; Keith Scopinich; Nicholas J. Verbitsky; Ed Salamon
- Headquarters: New York City, New York, U.S.
- Area served: United States
- Key people: Nicholas J. Verbitsky (Chairman, and CEO); Ed Salamon (Chief Programming Officer)
- Website: www.unitedstations.com

United Stations Radio Networks
- Type: Radio network
- Country: United States
- Availability: Distributed nationally and internationally by affiliates
- Launch date: 1994

United Stations Radio Networks (United Stations) is a radio network that provides a variety of radio programs and programming services for radio stations throughout the United States and elsewhere. It is based in New York City.

== History ==
The company was founded in February 1994 by pop icon Dick Clark and radio veterans Nick Verbitsky and Ed Salamon. Verbitsky continued to serve as the company's CEO, while Andy Denemark serves as the Vice President of Programming and plays a large role in company contributions.

The similarly named "United Stations Radio Network" (singular), also founded by Clark, Verbitsky, and Salamon in 1980, bought the RKO Radio Networks in 1985 and eventually merged with CBS Radio and the original incarnation of Westwood One.

In 2023, Gemini XIII, a company established by executives formerly with Dial Global and Cadence13, agreed to purchase United Stations.

== Programming ==
United Stations's entertainment program offerings include Rewind with Gary Bryan, America's Greatest Hits with Scott Shannon, The House of Hair, various programs hosted by Tom Kent, Lex and Terry, Absolutely 80s with Nina Blackwood, Open House Party,', the Lou Brutus shows hardDrive and hardDriveXL, The Sandy Show, Rick Jackson's Country Classics, and the daily Music Calendar. The company also co-manages, along with iHeartMedia, the Your Smooth Jazz network provided by Broadcast Architecture.

United Stations distributes Bloomberg Radio's 24-hour and short-form business news programming. Weather information is sourced from AccuWeather, whose forecasts USRN has distributed since 2009 (taking over the distribution from the original Westwood One). Previously, Al Roker and John Wetherbee ran USRN's weather division.

Other services include a morning prep service known as "Pulse of Radio", as well as comedy programming. United Stations distributes college football broadcasts from Touchdown Radio Productions.

In February 2023, United Stations launched The TJ Show, a syndicated morning show hosted by former WODS morning host and WHTZ co-host TJ Taormina. In response to Gemini XIII's acquisition of United Stations, Nights with Alice Cooper departed the network in September 2023.
