= Melody Maids =

- Origin: Beaumont, Texas, United States
- Years active: 1942–1972
- Past members: Eloise Milam

Melody Maids were an all-girl singing group from Beaumont, Texas that toured the world from 1942 to 1972. Dick Dowling Junior High School music teacher Eloise Rush Milam was asked to help arrange entertainment for a bond rally at the Jefferson Theatre in Beaumont. Milam also gave private voice lessons to junior high and high school-aged girls, so she presented her students as a choral group, all dressed in white. Since the newspaper insisted on having a name for the group, they decided to call themselves the Melody Maids. This first performance was on July 4, 1942.

== Touring ==
Although they performed for many types of audiences, their decades of service to the military began that December, singing at Camp Polk (now Fort Polk), Louisiana. The Melody Maids began to travel from coast to coast singing for military bases, military hospitals, veterans and other civic organizations. They also recorded radio broadcasts. The group made four tours of Europe, several to England, three to the Far East, seven to the far North, four to the Caribbean, five to Mexico, seven to Hawaii, and four to Bermuda, Iceland, and the Azores. The girls financed some of the tours themselves by holding bake sales, silver teas, style shows and other fund-raisers. After 1956, all of the Melody Maid tours were financed by the Entertainment Branch of the Department of Defense (not to be confused with the United Service Organizations). Of all the performers who traveled with the Entertainment Branch, the Melody Maids were requested the most.

== Morals, manners and music ==
The Melody Maids and Eloise Milam wore identical costumes. Their routines called for a variety of costume changes, depending on their location and the content of the show. The group had a book of rules for conduct and etiquette. This book, the Melody Maid "Bible," taught them how to act when presented to royalty and the correct way to present themselves at formal affairs. Milam always said she taught the girls morals, manners, and music, in that order. In addition to performing at the bases, their visits often included dances at the officers clubs, state dinners with foreign dignitaries, and seeing historical and cultural sites as their schedule allowed.

As the decades passed and the Melody Maids got more popular, competition was fierce for acceptance into the group. In later years, not only did the girls have to audition for Milam to get in the general Melody Maids, but had to further audition (behind a screen to even the playing field) for precious limited spots on the international tours. Being teenage girls, the tours were usually scheduled during winter breaks and summers in order not to conflict with their school attendance.

The Melody Maids sang standards, popular songs from the Hit Parade, and Broadway showtunes. Often, their performances included medleys of patriotic songs and/or hymns. Milam made many of the arrangements herself. Milam's son and trumpetist Bucky Milam also appeared at many performances with the Melody Maids.

== Milam as director and composer: Song Saga of Spindletop ==
To help celebrate the fiftieth anniversary of the discovery of oil at Spindletop in 1901, Milam wrote a musical production, Song Saga of Spindletop. The work contained twelve original songs written by Milam to salute the oil industry of Beaumont. Songs include "My Man's a Roughneck", "Ladders to the Sky" and the dramatic "Texas". The first performance was on the anniversary (January 10, 1951) of the Lucas Gusher and was lauded by Gulf Oil Company. The Melody Maids appeared on the television show "We, the People" in 1952 to perform the musical.

== Legacy ==
Following the death of her mother, Milam took a leave of absence from the Melody Maids. In 1972, Milam's husband, Mason Milam, retired from Mobil Oil. The anti-war movement and wide sociological-cultural changes had also impacted the Melody Maids ability to perform both domestically and internationally.

The legacy of the Melody Maids has been a long-lasting one. Through the years there were around 1,500 Melody Maids, and the group received many domestic and international awards. Milam was the first female Texas Ranger (Honorary), and in 1961, was given the Distinguished Service Award by the American Legion, Post No. 33. The Melody Maids and Milam have an article in the Handbook of Texas Music, by Laurie E. Jasinski (published in 2012). Several former Melody Maids went on to have careers in the arts (as teachers and performers), but all were certainly taught self-pride, graciousness and to live lives of service. In an era where the lives and activities of teenage females were limited, Eloise Milam and the Melody Maids offered opportunities to travel to distant lands, learn fundraising and public relations skills, and gain experience in service.

The Melody Maids had reunions, some with public performances in Beaumont, from 1977 to 2008.

Many of the Melody Maids kept in touch and established a tax exempt Melody Maid Foundation, which sponsored a $10,000 scholarship fund at Lamar University. The rehearsal hall of the Melody Maids at the Milam home (called The Harmony Hut) served as the repository for all Melody Maid photographs, costumes and programs. The Quonset building (donated by the City of Beaumont) that was the Harmony Hut was a lightweight structure that began showing its age in the 1980s. Consequently, a new home for all things Melody Maid was needed, and at a museum setting was deemed most appropriate. The Eloise Milam–Melody Maid Rose Room at the Julie Rogers Theater in Beaumont opened in 1990. Scrapbooks, souvenirs, photographs, and other memorabilia are housed there. The room is open to the public by request.

In 2000 the Melody Maids performed Song Saga of Spindletop at their annual reunion as a tribute to Eloise Milam. Milam died on October 3, 2008, at the age of 100.
