= Bill Mack (songwriter) =

American musician (1929–2020)

Bill Mack Smith Jr. (June 4, 1929 – July 31, 2020) was an American country music songwriter, singer, and radio host. While at WBAP Radio, Mack initiated the Bill Mack Million Mile Club for truckers achieving one million miles of accident-free over-the-road driving.

== Life ==
For many years, Mack was best known as the host of The Country Roads Show, (later U.S. 1 Trucking Show, and later still, Midnight Cowboy Trucking Show) the overnight country music show on WBAP, a clear channel station in Fort Worth. Mack's show catered primarily to truck drivers who traveled during the late-night hours. Its opening theme music was an instrumental rendition of "Orange Blossom Special", performed by Felix Slatkin and his orchestra.

Because of WBAP's clear channel signal range via skywave at night, Mack's show was heard over most of the continental United States. Mack began his show in 1969. He briefly took his show to Mexican "border blaster" station XERF, but returned to WBAP when an agreement for Mack to do his show from his Fort Worth home fell through.

In addition, Mack hosted the syndicated radio show Country Crossroads, heard on more than 800 stations across the country, and a similar cable television show on FamilyNet. He also hosted the Overdrive Top Ten Countdown, a weekly one-hour country music countdown geared toward truckers, in syndication.

Mack left WBAP to join XM Satellite Radio on its Open Road channel (XM 171). Two of the other main personalities on Open Road, Dave Nemo and Dale "The Truckin' Bozo" Sommers, were Mack's primary competitors before all three left their AM radio stations to join XM. Mack's radio program was heard weekdays on XM channel 13 from 12 Noon to 3 PM Eastern, and rebroadcast from Midnight to 3 AM Eastern. On April 29, 2011, Mack announced that Sirius/XM had terminated his contract to make room for a merger of two of the channels The Roadhouse and Willie's Place into one channel and that this was his final show.

Mack was succeeded on his WBAP show by Eric Harley, and the show was renamed the Midnight Radio Network and then Red Eye Radio several years later.

In the country music industry, Mack was also a songwriter. His best-known song is "Blue," one of LeAnn Rimes' biggest hits. The song won Mack the Grammy Award for Best Country Song in 1997. Mack also wrote "Drinking Champagne," which has been recorded by numerous artists. The song was a hit for Cal Smith in 1968, and again for George Strait in 1990 on his album Livin' It Up. Some of his other songs have been recorded by Dean Martin, Ray Price, Jerry Lee Lewis and George Jones.

In 2000, Mack won the media category award given by the Grand Ole Opry. He was named to the Texas Country Music Hall of Fame in 1999, and the Country Music DJ and Radio Hall of Fame in 1982.

Bill Mack lived in Fort Worth, Texas, with his wife, Cynthia. They had three children - Misty Dawn, Billy Mack III, and Sunday Renee. They had several grandchildren as well as one nephew - Jeff Harrison. Bill Mack had a daughter named Debbie from a previous marriage.

Bill Mack Smith III ("Billy") has followed in his father's footsteps and has his own radio show with 92.1 Hank FM in Fort Worth, Texas.

Mack died on July 31, 2020. According to his family, he had been diagnosed with COVID-19 two days prior amid the COVID-19 pandemic in Texas.
