= Saying Hello, Saying I Love You, Saying Goodbye =

Single by Jim Ed Brown and Helen Cornelius

from the album I Don't Want to Have to Marry You
- B-side: "My Heart Cries for You"
- Released: November 1976
- Genre: Country
- Length: 2:27
- Label: RCA Victor
- Songwriters: Jeff Barry, Brad Burg, Dene Hotheinz
- Producer: Bob Ferguson

Jim Ed Brown and Helen Cornelius singles chronology
| "I Don't Want to Have to Marry You" (1976) | "Saying Hello, Saying I Love You, Saying Goodbye" (1976) | "Born Believer" (1977) |

"Saying Hello, Saying I Love You, Saying Goodbye" is a song written by Jeff Barry, Brad Burg and Dene Hotheinz, and recorded by American country music artists Jim Ed Brown and Helen Cornelius.

It was released in November 1976 as the second single from the album I Don't Want to Have to Marry You. The song peaked at number 2 on the Billboard Hot Country Singles chart. It also reached number 1 on the RPM Country Tracks chart in Canada.

== Chart performance ==
| Chart (1976–1977) | Peak position |
|---|---|
| U.S. Billboard Hot Country Singles | 2 |
| Canadian RPM Country Tracks | 1 |
