= Ed Salamon =

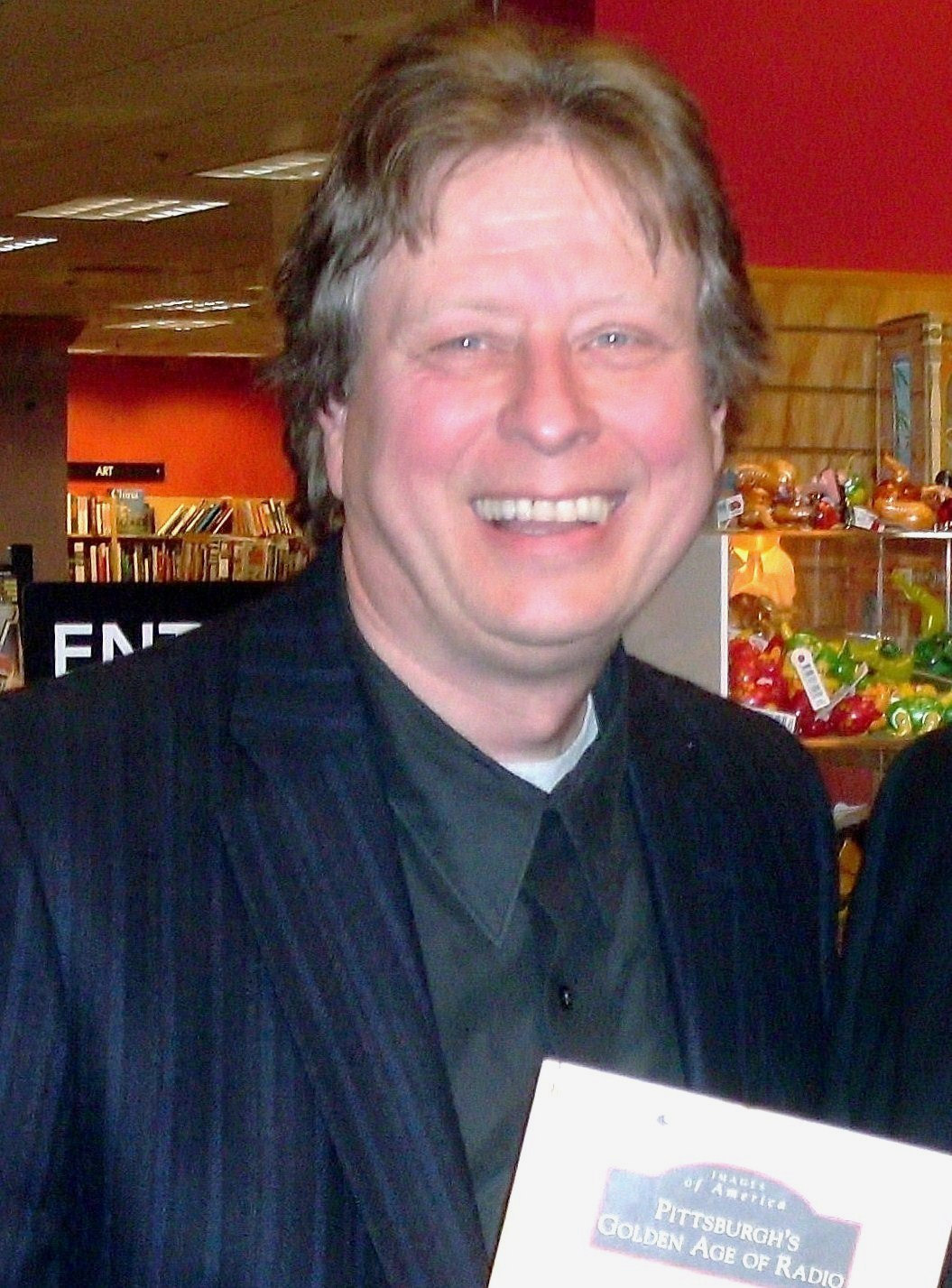
Salamon at a book signing in 2009

Edward R. Salamon is an American entertainment industry executive and radio broadcaster. He is credited as one of the people who led to country music becoming a major force in the mid-1990s. He was dubbed “country radio’s most influential programmer” while programming WHN, New York, which became the most listened to country radio station of all time in the mid-1970s, an accomplishment that led to his induction into the Country Radio Hall of Fame in 2006.

Salamon's success at WHN encouraged the establishment of country radio stations in other urban and non-traditional country markets, which greatly expanded the audience for country radio, and, in turn, increased the exposure of country music. He has been credited with reinventing country radio because his programming techniques, viewed as radical at the time, were emulated by other broadcasters, many of which went on to greater successes in the radio industry. After WHN, Salamon headed a succession of national radio networks for twenty consecutive years.

== Early career ==
Salamon began his radio career in 1970 as assistant promotions manager and director of market research for KDKA in Pittsburgh. Upon his promotion to music director, he applied the methodology used for sales research to programming. His techniques led to his being hired, in 1973, for his first job as program director, at country-formatted WEEP, a Pittsburgh daytime-only AM station, which was virtually at the bottom of the local radio ratings. At WEEP, he furthered his use of research for programming and became the first country radio program director to adopt the formatics, most notably short playlists, used in Top 40 Radio. Under Salamon's guidance, WEEP became second rated only to KDKA in the Pittsburgh Total Survey Area.

== WHN Years ==
Storer Broadcasting's WHN switched to country music in 1973. When Salamon was hired in 1975, the station had gone through three program directors and was mired in 14th position. The prevailing wisdom was that country radio could not be successful in the urban market of New York. Using the techniques he refined in Pittsburgh, the format “mixed timely artists like George Jones, Jerry Lee Lewis, and Dolly Parton with the timeless Hank Williams. Also in the mix were contemporary country rockers, like The Eagles, crossover popsters like John Denver, and odd weepy novelties and off-center artists that New York just had to love, like Kinky Friedman." While at WHN, Salamon partnered with Jim Halsey to bring an Oak Ridge Boys concert to Carnegie Hall. and assembled a staff of personalities who were able to make country relatable to New Yorkers.

WHN's impact in New York was significant enough to cause Top 40 formatted WABC to add country records to their playlist on the strength of record sales generated by airplay on WHN. Country artists heard on WABC at the time included Kenny Rogers, Crystal Gayle, Willie Nelson, Dolly Parton and Eddie Rabbitt.

A year after Salamon joined WHN, the Business and Finance section of The New York Times Bicentennial edition reported that the station had “skyrocketed to listenership in the number two position among competitors, and its 1.5 million listeners are eagerly sought by local and national advertisers.” Front page advertisements in Broadcasting Magazine touted WHN as “#2 Adults 25-49 all week long” and the “biggest thing since Rock’n’Roll (a reference to the format of WABC, the only station ahead of WHN in the ratings). In 1976, WHN was named Station of the Year by Billboard Magazine. A year later, WHN was again named Station of the Year by Billboard Magazine, and Salamon was named Program Director of the Year. While there was no doubt about WHN’s programming success, sales success was not as clear. Sponsors back then were reticent to have their commercials run on country music stations, even when the ratings warranted it.

Salamon was named National Program Director of the Radio Division of WHN’s parent company, Storer Broadcasting in 1978, supervising programming for its stations in Miami, Chicago, and in Los Angeles, where he served as acting general manager for KTNQ (10Q), hiring high profile air personalities including Charlie Tuna and Jack Armstrong. In 1980, when WHN was acquired by the Mutual Broadcasting System, Salamon remained with the station and added responsibilities at Mutual, being charged with the changing the format of the company’s legendary WCFL in Chicago from Talk back to a music format.

Salamon was named Program Director of the Year by Billboard Magazine for three consecutive years from 1979 through 1981. In 1980, he also received the Billboard award for National Syndicated Program of the Year for “The Johnny Cash Silver Anniversary Special”, which he produced for Mutual. Additionally WHN was named Billboard's Station of The Year in 1980 and 1981.

== National Radio Network Management ==
In 1981, Salamon formed The United Stations Radio Network with Dick Clark and other former Mutual executives, where he created programming, which was carried at one time or another by nearly every County station in America, including “The Weekly Country Music Countdown” and “Dick Clark’s Rock, Roll and Remember”, both of which were still on the air 25 years later. In 1985, United Stations acquired the RKO Radio Network and in 1989, it merged with Transtar Radio Networks to form Unistar, where Salamon served as President of Programming and hosted his own weekly series, “The Stories Behind The Song” in addition to live network interview specials with Garth Brooks and Alabama.

In 1994, when Unistar merged with Westwood One, Salamon remained President of Programming for the combined company, a position he held until 2002. Westwood One had previously acquired the Mutual Radio Network in 1985, where Salamon began his network radio career, and two years after that acquired the NBC Radio Network, prior to the Unistar merger. At Westwood One, Salamon was directly responsible for guiding the network's big-name entertainers including David Letterman, Jay Leno, Martha Stewart and Charles Osgood, and was instrumental in bringing new talent and brands to radio including Jon Stewart and Fox News. Programs for which he was responsible aired on over 1,800 radio stations.

== Nashville Leadership ==
Salamon relocated to Nashville in 2002 where he became executive director the Country Radio Broadcasters, a Nashville-based non profit organization which conducts the Country Radio Seminar (CRS), an annual meeting of country radio program directors and country music executives dating back to 1970. The CRS is the longest continuously running national meeting for radio programmers of any format. Salamon first attended the CRS in 1974 where he received a hostile reaction to his then novel stance of researching music, which is commonplace today. Two years later he was invited to join their board of directors, upon which he remained until being named executive director of the organization.

In 2006, Salamon was inducted into the Country Radio Seminar Hall of Fame, which cited his influence as a mentor to radio programmers and his achievement in programming the most listened to country radio station of all time (WHN).

In 2007, Salamon joined more than two dozen other radio and music industry luminaries as members of the Nominating Committee of the Hit Parade Hall of Fame.

Salamon left the Country Radio Broadcasters in 2009, becoming chief executive officer for the Savannah Music Group, a music publishing company and record label which during his tenure scored its first #1 song.

== Educator and Author ==
Salamon began teaching Mass Communications as an adjunct professor at Middle Tennessee State University in 2003. Two years later, he joined Belmont University in a similar capacity. While at Belmont, he was asked to develop a course on Entertainment Leadership, which he taught in their Mike Curb School of Entertainment and Music Business.

Salamon's first book ‘’Pittsburgh’s Golden Age of Radio’’, was published in 2010 by Arcadia Publishing, a leading publisher of local history books in Mt. Pleasant, SC. His second book, ‘’WHN: When New York City Went Country’’ was published by Archer Books, Santa Maria, CA, on February 25, 2013, coinciding with the 40th anniversary of WHN's switch to a country format. The book debuted at the WHN reunion in Manhattan and was promoted during the on-air reunion broadcast the following day on WFDU-FM.
