= Road Dog Trucking =

Sirius XM satellite radio channel

- Broadcast area: United States / Canada
- Frequency: SiriusXM ch. 146.
- Branding: Road Dog Trucking

Programming
- Format: Talk radio for Truckers
- Affiliations: AP Radio News; The Weather Channel

Ownership
- Owner: Sirius XM Radio

History
- First air date: 2001

Technical information
- Class: Satellite radio

Links
- Website: siriusxm.com/roaddogtrucking

Road Dog Trucking is a truckers' talk radio channel on the Sirius XM Radio service. It covers subjects relevant to the trucking community, including politics, economics, and social issues. On February 17, 2009, the programming of the Sirius channel merged with the programs aired on XM Radio's Open Road. The majority of programs from both services were retained.

== History ==
=== Road Dog Trucking (Sirius) ===
In 2003, Sirius launched its dedicated truckers channel Sirius Trucking Network. It retained the name until March 2006, when the channel was renamed Road Dog Trucking.

From 2002 to 2009 the show Open Road Cafe (later called The Loading Dock) with Mark Willis and Elizabeth Walsh aired in the morning slot.

=== Open Road (XM) ===
Open Road launched on XM with personnel from America's Trucking Radio network, including Bill Mack, Dave Nemo, and Truckin' Bozo Dale Sommers. It also played a daily, one-hour-long program called Land Line Now, brought to the listeners by OOIDA. America's Trucking Network, hosted by Steve Sommers, previously held the overnight slot on this channel (dating back to the days when Dale himself hosted the show in this slot) until ATN's flagship station WLW began simulcasting on XM.

Prior to October 2007, the overnights were filled with non-trucker programming (namely, replays of Dave Ramsey and a tape delay of Online Tonight with David Lawrence) so as to protect America's Trucking Network from competition. However, beginning October 8, 2007, the Midnight Radio Network, hosted by Eric Harley, assumed the overnight slot from 1 to 6 am eastern time. The show was carried on Sirius' Road Dog Trucking until the show was dropped without warning in September 2007.

Dave Ramsey is still heard on XM 165, but David Lawrence, who had been a part of XM Satellite Radio's lineup since 2002, and at one point even had his own channel with replays all day, was dropped from the service as a whole.

=== Road Dog Trucking (post-merger) ===
In January 2009, a merged Sirius XM removed Midnight Trucking Network from the XM service, after having removed it from the Sirius service over a year earlier. Over a month later, it was announced that the two trucking channels would merge into one. The lineup included Dave Nemo, Dale Sommers, Kevin Rutherford, Meredith Ochs, Chris T., Evan Lockridge, Glen Jones, and Mark Reddig. Bill Mack, heard on Open Road mid-days, was moved to Willie's Place to continue his music intensive program, as well as his Sunday Grand Ol' Gospel program. All content heard on Road Dog Trucking is a Sirius XM exclusive product. Sommers died in 2012.
