= Bill Cody (radio host) =

American radio and television host (1958–2026)

- Born: Trent Barry Clutts; December 16, 1958; Huntsville, Alabama, U.S.
- Died: June 9, 2026 (aged 67); Tennessee, U.S.
- Other name: Cowboy Bill Cody
- Occupations: Radio host; television host
- Years active: 1971–2026
- Known for: Hosting the Grand Ole Opry

Bill Cody (born Trent Barry Clutts; December 16, 1958 – June 9, 2026) was an American radio and television host known for presenting country music radio shows with WSM and hosting the Grand Ole Opry.

== Early life and education ==
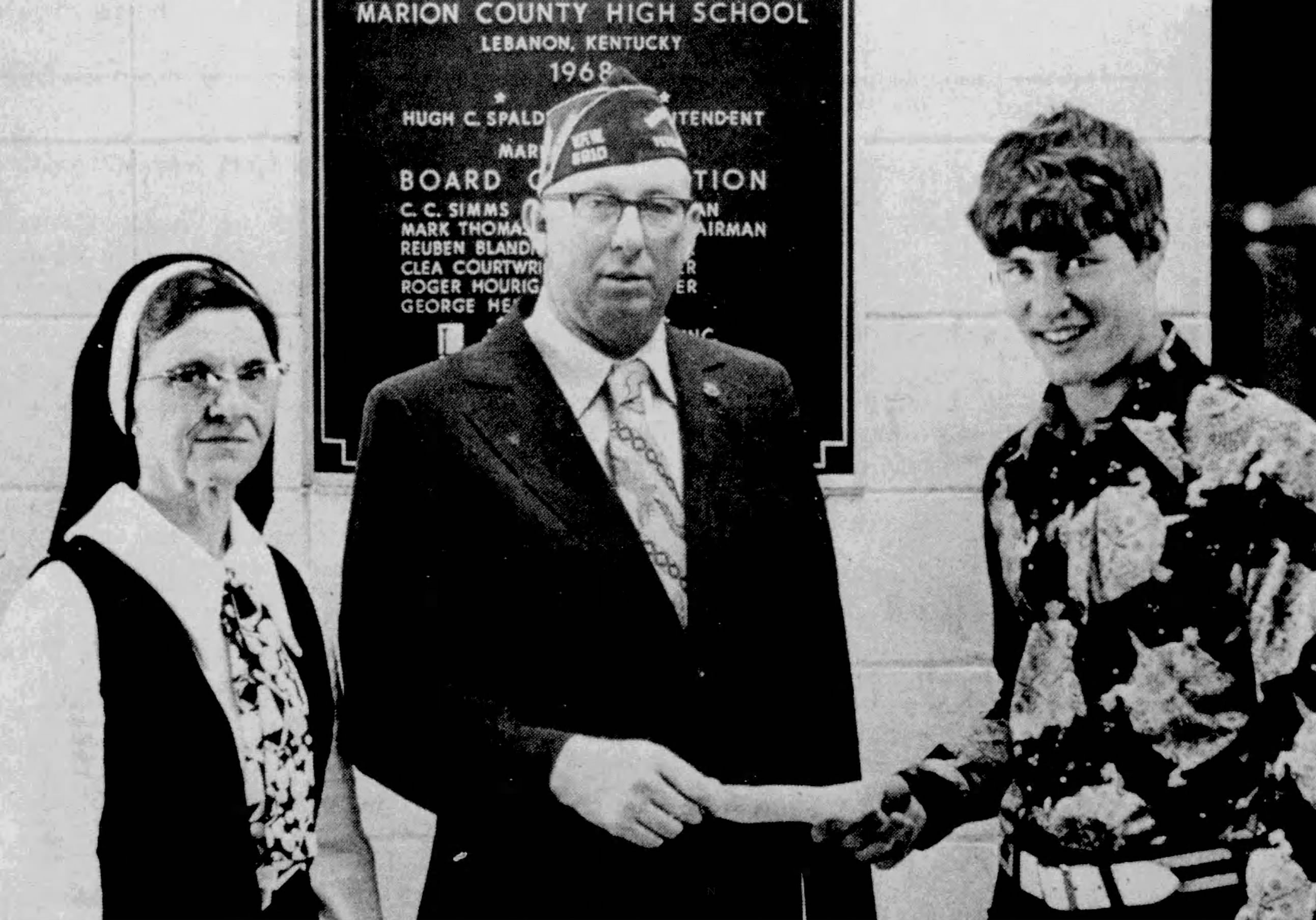
Cody (right) receiving an award for a speech contest in February 1975

Bill Cody was born Trent Barry Clutts on December 16, 1958, in Huntsville, Alabama. His parents Helen Ruth (née Robinson) and William Allen Clutts were natives of Harvest, Alabama, and he had a brother named Allen Ray Clutts. William Clutts worked as a plumber in Alabama, but the family moved to Lebanon, Kentucky, when Cody was around two years old so that William could study at Campbellsville College to become a Southern Baptist minister. William was pastor for five churches during his career, served on the Marion County Board of Education and was a member of the city council for Lebanon. As a pastor, his sermons were played locally on the WLBN radio station and Cody would visit with his father to drop off recordings.

A student of Marion County High School, Cody served as vice-president of the National Honor Society and senior class president during the 1975/6 school year. He competed at regional speech tournaments, winning in the "Broadcasting" category, and played the titular king in the school's production of The King and I. In 1976, Cody was a student of Campbellsville College.

== Career ==
At twelve years old, Cody began working for WLBN doing odd jobs around the station. He soon began reading the news for radio host Frank Kemp, becoming known for his surprisingly deep voice. After six years at WLBN, he joined Lexington's WVLK radio station as host of its 7 p.m. to midnight show. It was there that he began using the names Bill Cody and Cowboy Bill Cody, taking them from the Wild West showman Buffalo Bill Cody.

On January 29, 1979, Cody began working for WHAS. He worked a variety of shows for the station, including night shifts, evening shifts, and the 2 p.m. to 6 p.m. weekday slot. He then briefly hosted the morning show for WCII before moving to host the morning show for Florida country music station WHOO in 1985.

After two years in Florida, Cody became the morning show host for KKYX in San Antonio, Texas. In 1994, Cody joined the WSM radio station in Nashville. He became known for his Coffee, Country & Cody breakfast show and hosting the Grand Ole Opry show.

=== Television and other work ===
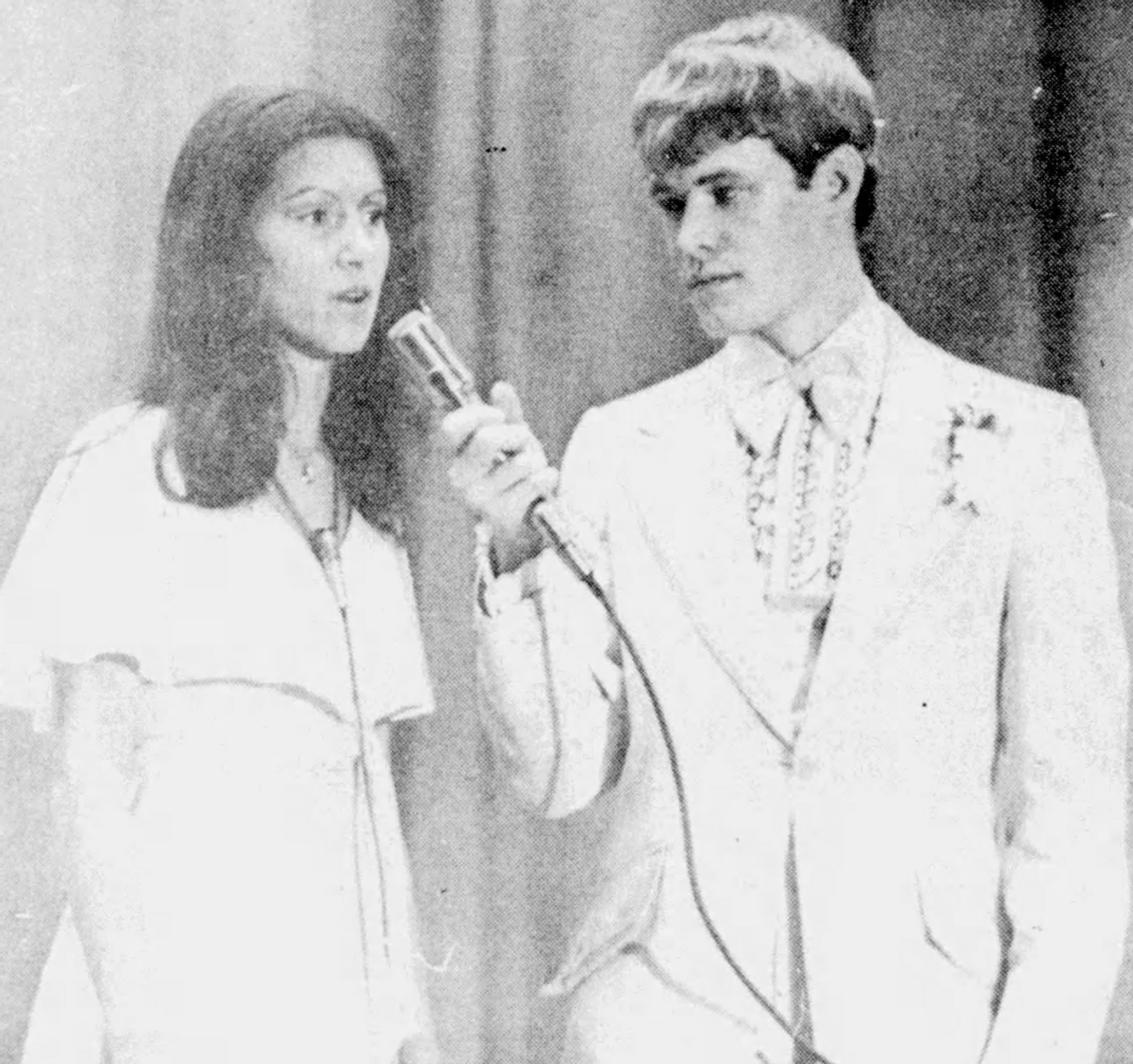
Cody interviewing Mary Hall Surface at the Junior Miss pageant in October 1976

Cody was a frequent master of ceremonies for the Marion County Junior Miss Program (later known as the Marion County Young Woman of the Year Program), hosting for the fifteenth time in 1990. He retired from the position in 1995 on his twentieth consecutive year as host, receiving a silver tray and custom-made quilt from the pageant organisers as thanks. Cody later returned to Marion County to host the pageant's fiftieth event in 2013.

During the 1990s, he served as arena announcer for the Nashville Knights. He also voiced the country music channel on United Airlines's in-flight service.

Cody appeared on various television shows throughout his career, including A Day in the Life of Country Music in October 1993. He co-hosted Cool Country in January 1993, was on-camera host for Fishing Texas, and was co-host of the Third Prime Time Country Music Special in January 1994.

== Personal life and death ==
Cody met his wife Rebecca Brents Wheatley as a teenager and they were married in Lebanon on February 29, 1980. The couple spent more than fifty years together, having two sons (Luke and Levi) and a daughter (Hannah). While Cody worked at WHAS, the family lived in an 1867-built log cabin near Pekin, Indiana. They later lived in Mount Juliet, Tennessee, and were living in Cross Plains, Tennessee, when Cody died.

In May 2026, Cody was admitted to the intensive care unit with heart and kidney failure. He died a few weeks later on June 9, 2026.

Cody's funeral was held on June 15 at the Grand Ole Opry House in Nashville. The service was attended by musicians including Garth Brooks and Trisha Yearwood, radio personalities including Lorianne Crook and Keith Bilbrey, and Cody's morning show co-hosts Charlie Mattos and Kelly Sutton. It included performances by Vince Gill, Carly Pearce, T. Graham Brown, The Isaacs, Suzy Bogguss, Jamie Johnson and Ana Cristina Cash. The latter two performed a song titled "On My Radio", which was written about Bill Cody.

== Legacy ==
Following Cody's death, country musician Dierks Bentley said he was "just as important as any artist, songwriter or musician" in the country music industry.

== Honors ==
In 1989, Cody was awarded the Mark of Excellence award by the Society of Professional Journalists for best radio sports story and feature.

In 2008, Cody was inducted into the Country Radio Hall of Fame. He was given a star on Nashville's Music City Walk of Fame in 2024.

In May 2026, Cody was announced as a 2026 inductee to the Tennessee Radio Hall of Fame.
