= Dale Sommers =

American radio personality

Bruce Dale Sommers (November 26, 1943 – August 24, 2012), known by his nickname "The Truckin' Bozo", was an American radio personality, best known for his long-running country music show geared toward truck drivers. Sommers hosted the overnight show from Cincinnati, Ohio-based clear-channel station WLW from 1984 to 2004, and it was carried by a small network of similarly high-powered stations across the United States. Sommers discontinued playing music on his nightly show, focusing on general and truck news, and talk from his listeners. Sommers announced his retirement from radio in 2004, but XM Satellite Radio was successful in getting him to do an afternoon truck show, which aired on Sirius Satellite Radio and XM from 4 PM to 7 PM Eastern time. Sommers retired from XM/Sirius on June 21, 2012, only to return for the last time on July 16, 2012.

== Biography ==
=== History ===
Born Glen Council in Humboldt, Tennessee, Sommers moved to Cincinnati with his family at the age of 15. The next year (1959), be began working for WAEF. Sommers worked for other local radio stations in Cincinnati, as well as in Evansville, Indianapolis, Seattle, San Diego, Miami, and Kansas City, before settling back at WLW in 1984. His nickname "The Truckin' Bozo" reportedly came from his former boss at WLW, Randy Michaels. During a station remodeling, Michaels saw Sommers kick a wall. Unfortunately, its supports had been removed and it came crashing down across a desk, prompting Michaels to call Sommers “a bozo.” Sommers retired from WLW in 2003 but shortly thereafter assumed work at XM, joining the Open Road channel in a daytime slot. Sommers would remain with the channel through its merger with Sirius's Road Dog Trucking channel up until shortly before his death.

=== Catching a robber ===
"The Bozo" made national headlines when he helped to catch a robber at a convenience store in Camilla, Georgia. Sommers was talking live on the air with regular caller Linda Driskill, known as "Mississippi Lady" to listeners, when he heard Driskill admonish someone not to come behind her counter. She then hung up the phone. Sommers was concerned for her safety, so he called the Camilla police (who knew Driskill from Sommers' show). The police responded to Driskill's store and quickly apprehended the robber.

=== Comments on Mexicans ===
Sommers has raised some controversy among Mexican truckers for his apparent negative comments on the radio regarding cross-border trucking. He was often heard supporting bans on Mexican trucks in the United States.

== Family and health ==
Sommers was married to Sharon Cox Sommers for 35 years. Sharon ran a travel agency until May 2004 and retired from the travel business. She died August 10, 2016, at her home in Mason, Ohio. Dale and Sharon spent approximately nine months a year in Florida and the summer months in Cincinnati. Sommers had a studio in his Florida home and also in his Cincinnati home so he could continue working from both locations.

One of his sons is the media executive Sean Compton. another son, Steve Sommers, took over his father's overnight time slot on WLW; that show continued until iHeartMedia fired him in 2020 in a combination of financially related layoffs and disputes over the show's content.

In later years, Sommers was diagnosed with Addison's disease and insulin-dependent diabetes, which factored into his retirement from terrestrial radio. Despite his health difficulties, he maintained his satellite radio show until shortly before his death.

== Death ==
On the morning of August 24, 2012, Sommers died in a hospice facility near his home in Hernando, Florida at the age of 68.
