= The Three Bells =

Single by The Browns

from the album Sweet Sounds by The Browns
- B-side: "Heaven Fell Last Night"
- Released: July 3, 1959
- Recorded: June 3, 1959
- Studio: RCA Studio B
- Genre: Country; folk
- Length: 2:47
- Label: RCA Victor
- Songwriters: Jean Villard & Bert Reisfeld
- Producer: Chet Atkins

The Browns singles chronology
"Would You Care" (1958)	"The Three Bells" (1959)	"Scarlet Ribbons (For Her Hair)" (1959)

"The Three Bells", also known as "The Jimmy Brown Song", "Little Jimmy Brown", or simply "Jimmy Brown", is a song made popular by the Browns in 1959. The song is an English adaptation of the French-language song "Les Trois Cloches" written by Jean Villard, with English lyrics by Bert Reisfeld. The single reached number one in the U.S. on Billboard's Hot Country and Western Sides chart and the Billboard Hot 100 chart in 1959.

== Origin ==
The song is an English adaptation of the French-language song "Les Trois Cloches" written by Jean Villard (also known as Gilles). This French song narrates the life of someone named Jean-François Nicot who lived in a small village at the bottom of a valley, starting with his birth, then his marriage, and ending with his death, events all accompanied by ringing of the bells. The song was recorded a cappella by Edith Piaf with French vocal group Les Compagnons de la chanson using an arrangement by group member Marc Herrand in July 1946.

Piaf and Les Compagnons introduced the song to an American audience in a tour in 1947. Two different English versions of "Les trois cloches" were written in 1948 – "While the Angelus Was Ringing" (with unrelated lyrics and recorded by Frank Sinatra among others), and "The Three Bells". The English lyrics of "The Three Bells" were written by Bert Reisfeld, based broadly on the French original, and the named individual in the song was changed from Jean-François Nicot to Jimmy Brown. The Melody Maids recorded the English version in 1948. In 1950, Piaf herself recorded the English version. In 1951, The Andrews Sisters also recorded the song. Their version was the longest song the Andrews Sisters recorded for the label Decca Records, and although it was well received by Billboard, the release failed to chart. Les Compagnons de la chanson themselves also recorded an English version of "The Three Bells". This version reached number 14 in the United States in 1952, and number 21 in the UK in 1959.

== The Browns' recording ==
The most successful version of the song was recorded by the country group the Browns in 1959. The Browns at that time were considering quitting the music business, and for what they intended to be their last recording, they chose "The Three Bells". Bonnie Brown had first heard the song being played on a local radio station—a deejay had heard "Les Trois Cloches" by Les Compagnons in Europe, and brought the record back to the US and played the song on his shows, which brought attention to the English version—and contacted the deejay to get a copy of the song. As radio stations at that time rarely played songs longer than three minutes, the Browns shortened each of the three verses to keep their recording under three minutes.

The Browns recorded the song at the RCA Studio B in Nashville on June 3, 1959. The song was produced by Chet Atkins with Anita Kerr helping with the arrangement of the song. Atkins was convinced the song would be "the biggest hit ever", and told the Browns: "I've just recorded you a million-seller. There's no way you'll be quitting the business".

While editing the master to be sent to New York for pressing, the studio's sound engineer, Bill Porter, accidentally hit the wrong controls on the tape recorder and stretched the tape at the beginning of the song, distorting the pitch. Without telling anyone, he spliced a different take with a good introduction onto the beginning, and sent that version, instead. Four decades later, Porter recalled his quick fix: " This was a need-to-know situation, and I figured nobody needed to know. I had been in the business three months or something like that. You're not a good engineer until you destroy a master and hopefully live to talk about it."

== Commercial performance ==
The song was released on July 3, 1959. It reached number one on Billboard Hot 100, staying there for four weeks. It also topped the Hot Country and Western Sides chart for 10 weeks, as well as reaching number 10 on Billboard's Hot Rhythm and Blues Sides chart.

The song sold half a million copies within the first month of its debut on the chart, eventually selling over a million copies. The song received a Grammy nomination in 1959 for Best Record of the Year, but lost to "Mack the Knife".

== Other versions ==
The song has also been covered by many other artists. Brian Poole & The Tremeloes's version reached number 17 on the UK chart in 1965. Nana Mouskouri recorded a version in 1974 which reached number seven on the Dutch charts. The Irish singer Daniel O'Donnell recorded a version which reached number 19 on the Irish chart in 1991.

== Chart position ==
=== Les Compagnons de la chanson ===
Chart (1952–1959)	Peak position
Netherlands (Single Top 100)	4
UK Singles (Official Charts)	21
US Billboard Best Selling Pop Singles	14
US Cash Box Best Selling Singles	16

=== The Browns ===
Chart (1959)	Peak position
Australia	1
Belgium (Ultratop 50 Flanders)	13
Belgium (Ultratop 50 Wallonia)	42
Canada (CHUM Hit Parade) (3wks@1)	1
Netherlands (Single Top 100)	4
Norway VG-lista	6
UK - New Musical Express	6
US Billboard Hot 100	1
US Billboard Hot C&W Sides	1
US Billboard Hot R&B Sides	10
West Germany (GfK)	19

==== Year-end charts ====
Chart (1959)	Position
US Billboard Hot 100	7

=== Jim Ed Brown ===
Chart (1969)	Peak position
U.S. Billboard Hot Country Singles	29
Canadian RPM Country	22

=== Daniel O'Donnell ===
Chart (1991–1993)	Peak position
Ireland (IRMA)	19
UK Singles Chart	71

== See also ==
- While the Angelus Was Ringing
