= Helen Cornelius =

American singer-songwriter (1941–2025)

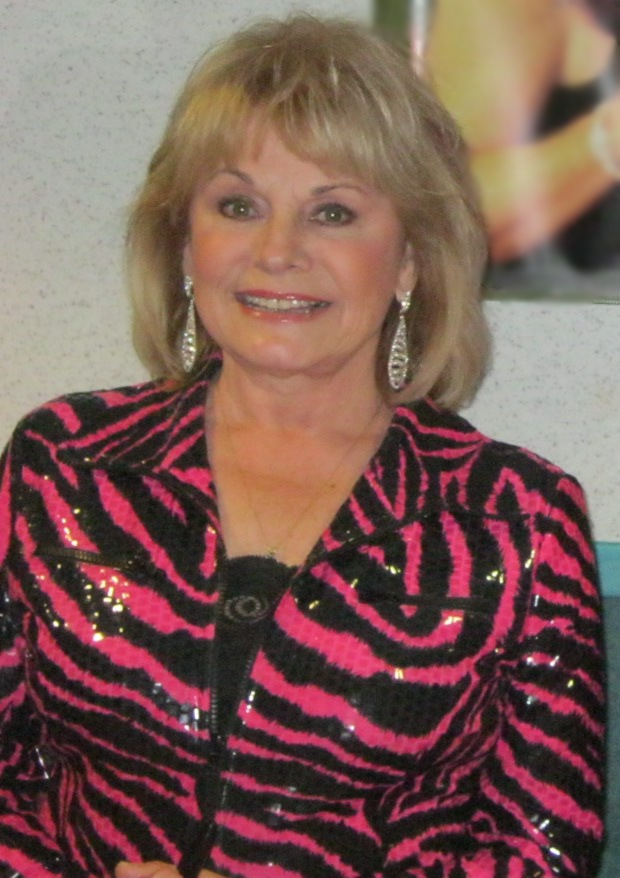
- Cornelius in 2012

Background information
- Born: Helen Lorene Johnson; December 6, 1941; Monroe City, Missouri, U.S.
- Died: July 18, 2025 (aged 83)
- Genre: Country
- Occupation: Singer-songwriter
- Years active: 1960–2025
- Labels: Dot; RCA Victor; MCA
- Spouse: Lewis Cornelius (divorced)

Helen Lorene Cornelius (née Johnson; December 6, 1941 – July 18, 2025), was an American country singer-songwriter, best remembered for a series of hit duets with Jim Ed Brown, many of which reached the U.S. country singles top ten during the late 1970s and early 1980s.

== Life and career ==
Helen Cornelius was born in Hannibal, Missouri, on December 6, 1941, and was raised on a farm near Monroe City, Missouri. Her older brothers played in country bands, and she formed a singing trio with sisters Judy and Sharon. Together they toured locally with the blessing of their father. Subsequently, Helen began touring on her own with a backup band called The Crossroads.

After completing high school, Cornelius married Lewis Cornelius, and became employed as a secretary. She began touring again at the end of the 1960s and signed with Screen Gems Music as a songwriter in 1970. When the company went under, she sent a demo tape to Jerry Crutchfield, who offered her a contract with MCA Records; eventually she signed with Columbia Records, with whom she released two singles. In 1975, she signed with RCA Records; two further singles followed with little recognition.

In 1976, she recorded a duet, "I Don't Want to Have to Marry You" with Jim Ed Brown; it was a major success in America. Further solo singles failed to take off, but her next duet with Brown, "Saying Hello, Saying I Love You, Saying Goodbye", was another smash, and the pair began playing on the TV show, Nashville on the Road. She continued to record with Brown, releasing the hits "I'll Never Be Free", "If the World Ran Out of Love Tonight", "Don't Bother to Knock", "Lying in Love with You", and finally notching a solo hit with "Whatcha Doin' After Midnight Baby". In 1981, after topping the U.S. country charts one last time with Brown with "Morning Comes too Early", Cornelius separated from Brown, and enjoyed moderate success as a solo artist, touring with The Statler Brothers and performing in an Annie Get Your Gun road show. In 1988, she and Brown reunited for a nationwide tour.

Cornelius opened Nashville South in Gatlinburg, Tennessee, in the 1990s, where she performed with a house band nightly. Early in the 2000s, she took a regular gig at the Jim Stafford Theater in Branson, Missouri. Most recently, Cornelius has been an active participant in the Country's Family Reunion series, which airs on RFD-TV.

Cornelius died on July 18, 2025, at the age of 83.

== Discography ==
=== Albums ===
| Year | Album | Label |
|---|---|---|
| 1985 | Helen Cornelius | Dot |

=== Albums with Jim Ed Brown ===
| Year | Album | Chart Positions | | Label |
| Year | Album | US Country | CAN Country | Label |
|---|---|---|---|---|
| 1976 | I Don't Want to Have to Marry You | 7 | — | RCA Victor |
| 1977 | Born Believer | 17 | — | RCA Victor |
| 1978 | I'll Never Be Free | 29 | — | RCA Victor |
| 1979 | You Don't Bring Me Flowers | 20 | 2 | RCA Victor |
| 1980 | One Man, One Woman | 35 | — | RCA Victor |
| 1981 | Greatest Hits | 47 | — | RCA Victor |

=== Singles ===
| Year | Single | Chart Positions | | Album |
| Year | Single | US Country | CAN Country | Album |
|---|---|---|---|---|
| 1976 | "There's Always a Goodbye" | 91 | — | I Don't Want to Have to Marry You |
| 1978 | "Whatcha Doin' After Midnight, Baby" | 30 | 68 | Singles only |
| 1979 | "It Started with a Smile" | 68 | — | Singles only |
| 1981 | "Love Never Comes Easy" | 42 | 40 | Singles only |
| 1983 | "If Your Heart's a Rollin' Stone" | 70 | — | Singles only |

=== Singles with Jim Ed Brown ===
| Year | Single | Chart Positions | | Album |
| Year | Single | US Country | CAN Country | Album |
|---|---|---|---|---|
| 1976 | "I Don't Want to Have to Marry You" | 1 | 7 | I Don't Want to Have to Marry You |
| 1976 | "Saying Hello, Saying I Love You, Saying Goodbye" | 2 | 1 | I Don't Want to Have to Marry You |
| 1977 | "Born Believer" | 12 | 8 | Born Believer |
| 1977 | "If It Ain't Love by Now" | 12 | 18 | Born Believer |
| 1977 | "Fall Softly Snow" | 91 | — | Single only |
| 1978 | "I'll Never Be Free" | 11 | 27 | I'll Never Be Free |
| 1978 | "If the World Ran Out of Love Tonight" | 6 | 7 | You Don't Bring Me Flowers |
| 1978 | "You Don't Bring Me Flowers" | 10 | 8 | You Don't Bring Me Flowers |
| 1979 | "Lying In Love with You" | 2 | 3 | You Don't Bring Me Flowers |
| 1979 | "Fools" | 3 | 14 | One Man, One Woman |
| 1980 | "Morning Comes Too Early" | 5 | 46 | One Man, One Woman |
| 1980 | "The Bedroom" | 24 | 26 | Greatest Hits |
| 1981 | "Don't Bother to Knock" | 13 | 48 | Greatest Hits |

=== Music videos ===
| Year | Video |
|---|---|
| 1990 | "Ask Any Woman" |
