= Maxine Brown (country singer) =

American country music singer (1931–2019)

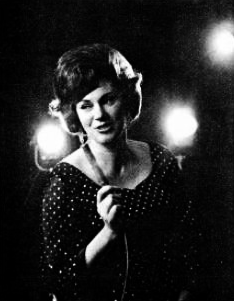
- Maxine Brown in 1967

Background information
- Born: Ella Maxine Brown; April 27, 1931; Campti, Louisiana, U.S.
- Died: January 21, 2019 (aged 87) Little Rock, Arkansas, U.S.
- Genres: country, folk, gospel
- Years active: 1955–1969
- Labels: RCA Victor, Chart Records

Ella Maxine Brown (April 27, 1931 – January 21, 2019) was an American country music singer and a member of the 1950s sibling trio the Browns, before a brief solo career.

== Biography ==
Brown was born in Campti, Louisiana, to Floyd Brown and Birdie Lee Tuberville Brown. She was one of five children, with two sisters (Bonnie and Norma), and two brothers (Jim Ed and Raymond). While she was still a toddler, her family moved to a farm near Sparkman, Arkansas. Encouraged by her parents, she began singing and performing at local venues. Brown signed a recording contract in 1954 with RCA Victor as half of a duo with younger brother Jim Ed Brown. Their humorous song "Looking Back to See" was a #8 hit during the summer of 1954.

In 1955, they toured with the then 20-year-old Elvis Presley as their younger sister Bonnie Brown joined Maxine and Jim Ed to create the trio group, the Browns. During this period, the group (both prior to and after Bonnie's joining) performed regularly on the Louisiana Hayride, which was a local option for getting their music and group sound out to the public. They scored their biggest hit when their folk-pop single "The Three Bells" reached number one on the Billboard Hot 100 pop and country charts in 1959. Prior to recording “The Three Bells,” the trio wanted to split up. Their music producer, Chet Atkins, convinced them to record one last song before parting ways. Their final decision was “The Three Bells,” a French song that Bonnie had wanted to record. Because of that success, they refrained from retiring at that time. In December 1959, "Scarlet Ribbons (For Her Hair)" proved to be a successful follow-up single, reaching #7 on the country chart and #13 on the Hot 100. The Browns' next hit was "The Old Lamp-Lighter" in 1960.

Another highlight for the group came in 1963, when they were inducted into Nashville's Grand Ole Opry. The Browns disbanded in 1967.

== Later life and death ==
Brown had a brief solo career during the late 1960s, releasing a single and an album for Chart Records titled Sugar Cane County.

Her autobiography, Looking Back to See, was published in 2005 by University of Arkansas Press. It described the American country music business in the 1950s and 1960s.

Maxine Brown died on January 21, 2019, at the age of 87 from complications of heart and kidney disease. She was preceded in death by siblings Jim Ed and Bonnie.
