= Bonnie Brown (musician) =

American country music singer (1938–2016)

- Also known as: Bonnie Brown Ring
- Born: Bonnie Jean Brown; July 31, 1938; Sparkman, Arkansas, U.S.
- Died: July 16, 2016 (aged 77) Little Rock, Arkansas, U.S.
- Genres: Country
- Occupation: Singer
- Years active: 1955–1967
- Label: RCA Victor
- Formerly of: Jim Ed Brown, Maxine Brown

Bonnie Jean Brown (July 31, 1938 – July 16, 2016) was an American country music singer and member of the Browns, a sibling trio popular in the 1950s and 1960s.

== Biography ==
Bonnie Jean Brown was born July 31, 1938, in Sparkman, Arkansas, to Floyd Iron Brown and Birdie Lee Tuberville Brown. Her parents owned a farm, and her father also worked at a sawmill. While Brown was still a child, the family moved to Pine Bluff, Arkansas. In 1955, at age 18, she joined her older siblings Maxine and Jim Ed, who were already performing as a duo, to form the musical trio the Browns. Signed by RCA Victor in 1956, the trio scored their biggest hit when their folk-pop single "The Three Bells" reached No. 1 on the Billboard Hot 100 pop and country charts. The single held the No. 1 spot on the pop charts for 4 weeks, and on the country charts for ten.

After she married Dr. Gene Ring in 1960, she was known as Bonnie Brown Ring.

In 1965, the Browns joined the Grand Ole Opry in Nashville, Tennessee, and disbanded in 1967 after Brown had decided to retire from the music business.

Unlike her siblings, Brown did not pursue a solo music career after the Browns dissolved, though the trio did reunite twice: in the 1980s, and in 2006 for a TV special Country Pop Legends.

In 2015, the trio was inducted into the Country Music Hall of Fame. Brown's brother, Jim, died of cancer June 11, 2015, and Maxine died on 21 January 2019.

== Death ==
On September 28, 2015, Brown announced that she had been diagnosed with stage 4 adenocarcinoma right lung cancer. She died of the illness on July 16, 2016, aged 77. She was survived by her sister Maxine Brown; and by her daughters. Her husband preceded her in death by six months.
