= Jim Ed Brown =

American country music singer (1934–2015)

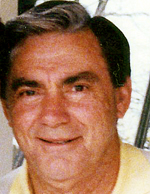
- Brown in 1993

Background information
- Also known as: Jim Ed Brown
- Born: James Edward Brown; April 1, 1934; Sparkman, Arkansas, U.S.
- Died: June 11, 2015 (aged 81) Franklin, Tennessee, U.S.
- Genres: Country
- Occupation: Singer
- Instruments: Vocals, guitar
- Years active: 1954–2015
- Label: RCA Victor
- Website: jimedbrown.com

James Edward Brown (April 1, 1934 – June 11, 2015) was an American country singer who achieved fame in the 1950s with his two sisters as a member of the Browns. He later had a successful solo career from 1965 to 1974, followed by a string of major duet hits with fellow country music vocalist Helen Cornelius, through 1981. Brown was also the host of the Country Music Greats Radio Show, a syndicated country music program from Nashville, Tennessee.

== Biography ==
Jim Ed was born on April 1, 1934, in Sparkman, Arkansas, to Floyd and Birdie Brown. His parents owned a farm and his father also worked at a sawmill. As small children, Jim and his sisters, Maxine and Bonnie, moved with their parents to Pine Bluff, Arkansas. As young adults, the three siblings sang together and individually. This changed in 1954 when Jim Ed and Maxine signed a recording contract as a duo. They earned national recognition and a guest spot on Ernest Tubb's radio show for their humorous song "Looking Back To See", which hit the top ten and stayed on the charts through the summer of 1954.

=== The Browns ===
Jim Ed and Maxine were joined in 1955 by 18-year-old Bonnie, and The Browns began performing on Louisiana Hayride in Shreveport, Louisiana. By the end of 1955, the trio were appearing on KWTO-AM in Springfield, Missouri, and had another top ten hit with "Here Today and Gone Tomorrow", which got a boost by their national appearances on ABC-TV's Ozark Jubilee. They signed with RCA Victor in 1956, and soon had two major hits, "I Take the Chance" and "I Heard the Bluebirds Sing". When Jim Ed was drafted in 1957, the group continued to record while he was on leave, and sister Norma filled in for him on tours. He was stationed at Fort Carson, Colorado.

In 1959, The Browns scored their biggest hit when their folk-pop single "The Three Bells" reached No. 1 on the Billboard Hot 100 pop and country charts. The song also peaked at No. 10 on Billboard's Rhythm and Blues listing. Remakes of the pop hits "Scarlet Ribbons" and "The Old Lamplighter" continued the hit streak, reaching the top 15 on Billboard's Pop and Country surveys. The trio had moderate successes on the country music charts for seven years thereafter. In 1963, they joined the Grand Ole Opry and in 1967 the group disbanded.

=== Solo career ===
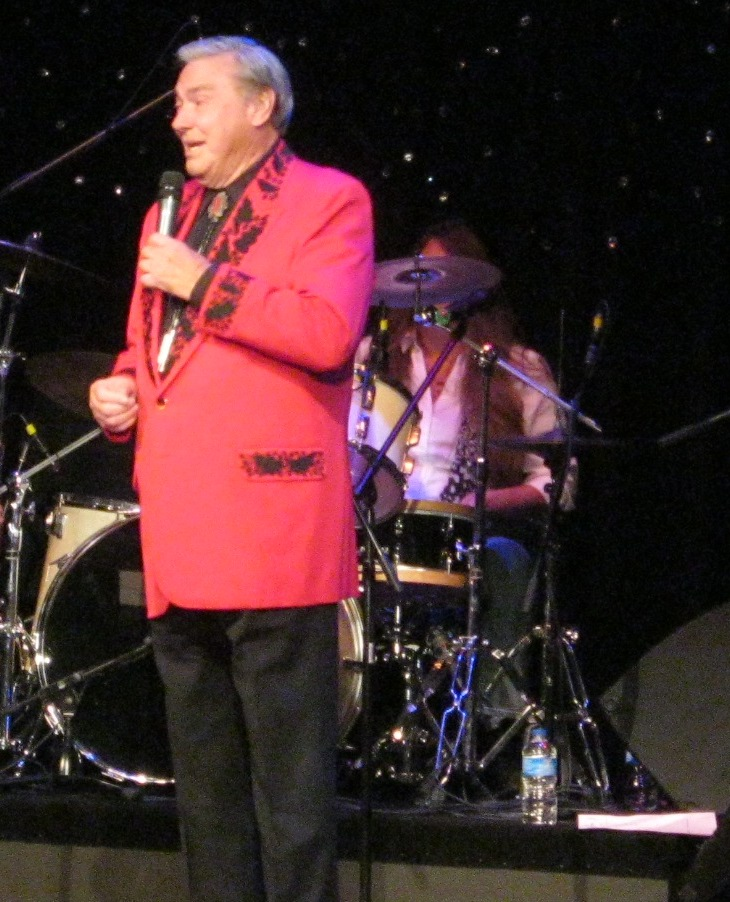
Brown performing in 2012

Brown continued to record for RCA Victor and had a number of country hits, starting in 1965 while still with his sisters. In 1967, he released his first solo top ten hit, "Pop a Top", which became his signature song. Beginning in 1969, he also gained his own syndicated TV series "The Country Place", which would become famous for introducing Crystal Gayle. The show ended in 1971. In 1970, he gained a crossover hit with "Morning" which went to No. 4 on the country charts and No. 47 on the pop charts. Other hits included "Angel's Sunday" (1971), "Southern Loving" (1973), "Sometime Sunshine" (1974) and "It's That Time Of Night" (1974).

Beginning in 1976, Brown released a string of major duet hits with Helen Cornelius starting with the No. 1 hit, "I Don't Want to Have to Marry You". Other hits for the duo included "Saying Hello, Saying I Love You, Saying Goodbye" (1977), "Born Believer" (1977), "I'll Never Be Free" (1978), "If the World Ran Out of Love Tonight" (1978), "You Don't Bring Me Flowers" (a cover of the then-recent Neil Diamond-Barbra Streisand hit) (1979), "Lying In Love With You" (1979), "Fools" (1979), "Morning Comes Too Early" (1980) and "Don't Bother to Knock" (1981).

Brown hosted the syndicated country television show Nashville on the Road, along with Jerry Clower, Helen Cornelius, and Wendy Holcombe. The entire cast was replaced in 1981. The new host, Jim Stafford, kept hosting it until it ended in 1983. Brown also hosted The Nashville Network programs You Can Be A Star (a talent show) and Going Our Way, which featured Brown and his wife Becky traveling the U.S. in an RV. Brown and his wife lived in the south Nashville suburb of Brentwood, Tennessee.

=== Radio host ===
Brown hosted two nationally syndicated country music radio shows, the weekly two-hour Country Music Greats Radio Show and the weekday short-form vignette, Country Music Greats Radio Minute. Both were broadcast by over 300 radio stations to a weekly audience exceeding three million, as well as on the Internet. Recorded at the Hard Scuffle Studios in Nashville, the Country Music Greats Radio Show blended music from the 1940s through the 1990s with an interview archive of country stars past and present. Brown also told tales of living and working in the country music industry.

=== Dollar General Stores Spokesperson ===
Beginning in 1975, Brown became a national spokesperson for the Dollar General Stores discount retailer. He appeared in frequent TV advertisements using the slogan, "Every day is dollar day at your Dollar General Store," and an autographed photo hung behind the cash register at many stores.

=== Grand Ole Opry ===
An active and popular member of the Grand Ole Opry since 1963, Jim Ed Brown would remain so until his death. He would occasionally reunite there with Helen Cornelius to perform their hit duets together.

=== Country Music Hall of Fame ===
In March 2015, it was announced that the Browns would be inducted into the Country Music Hall of Fame later in the year. With his health declining, Brown was inducted in June.

== Illness and death ==
Brown announced in September 2014 that he had been diagnosed with lung cancer and had temporarily retired from hosting his radio programs to undergo treatment. By early 2015 he was in remission and returned to hosting his radio programs. However, on June 3, 2015, he stated that the cancer had returned. Brown died a week later on June 11, 2015, at the age of 81.
