= Gavin Edwards (writer) =

American journalist and non-fiction writer

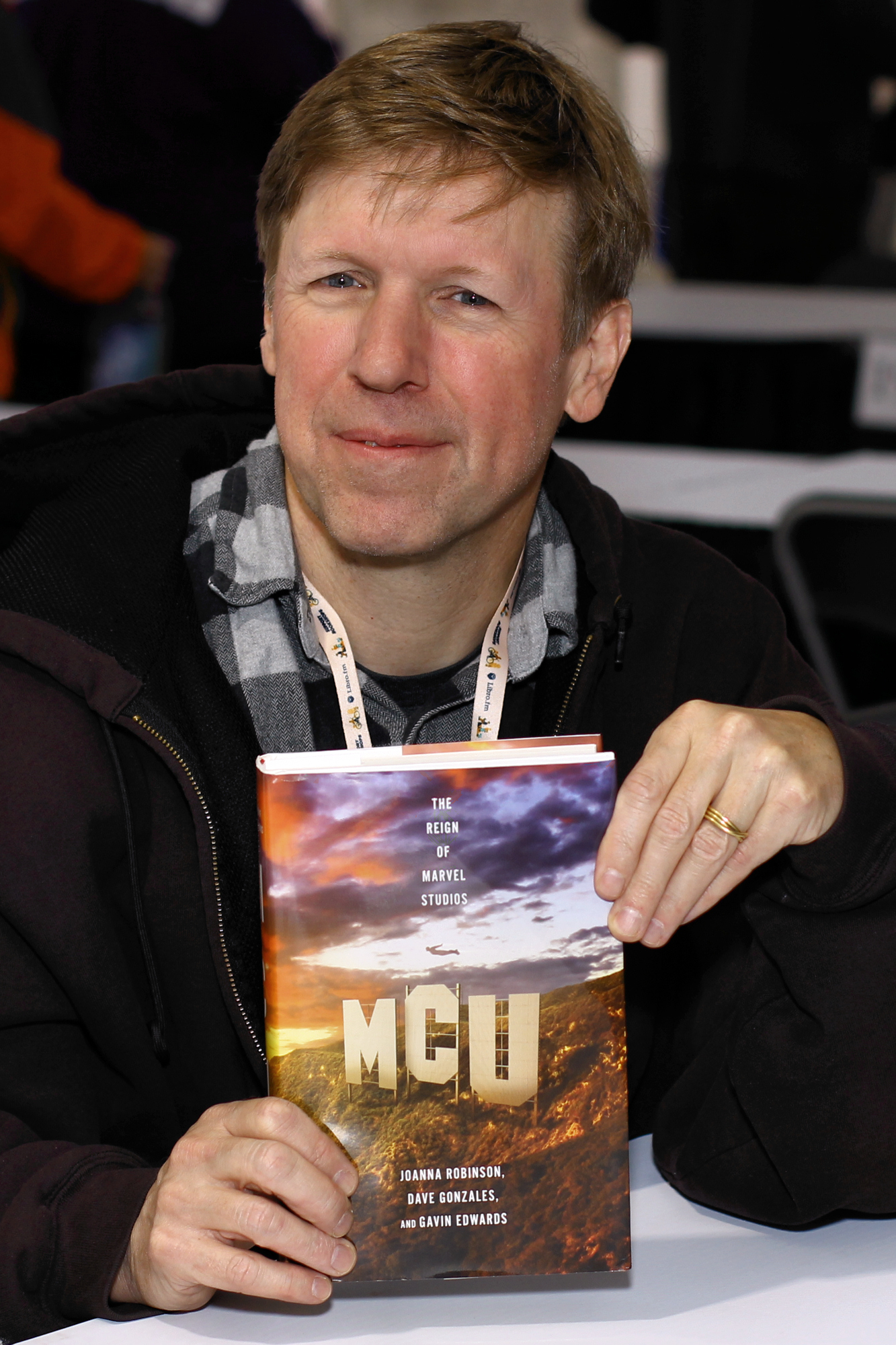
- Edwards at the 2023 Texas Book Festival
- Born: 1968 (age 57–58)
- Education: Yale University (BA)
- Occupations: Author, journalist
- Spouse: Jennifer Edwards
- Writing career
- Years active: 1990–present
- Subjects: Music, pop culture
- Website: www.rulefortytwo.com

Gavin Edwards (born 1968) is an American journalist and non-fiction writer. He has written fourteen books, including The Tao of Bill Murray: Real-Life Stories of Joy, Enlightenment, and Party Crashing (2016) and Bad Motherfucker: The Life and Movies of Samuel L. Jackson, the Coolest Man in Hollywood (2021). He co-wrote MCU: The Reign of Marvel Studios, a New York Times bestseller published in 2023.

== Early life ==
Edwards was born in New York to Scilla and James Edwards. He graduated from Yale University in 1990 with a Bachelor of Arts in English.

== Career ==
Focused primarily on music, Edwards began working as a contributing editor and associate editor at Details magazine in 1991. He later wrote for Wired, The New York Times and Rolling Stone, where, as a contributing editor, he wrote twelve cover stories.

In 1995, Touchstone Books published the first of Edwards' five books on misheard lyrics, Scuse Me While I Kiss This Guy.

Edwards' 2016 book, The Tao of Bill Murray, consisted of a brief biography of Bill Murray, a 106-page filmography of 59 films, and a breakdown of the "10 Principles of Bill", a "kind of existentialist/Zen mashup that preaches a heightened awareness of the present."

== Personal life ==
Edwards and his wife, curator Jennifer Sudul Edwards, live in Charlotte, North Carolina, with their son and daughter.

== Bibliography ==
- MCU: The Reign of Marvel Studios, with Joanna Robinson and Dave Gonzales; Liveright, October 2023 ISBN 978-1-63149-751-3
- Bad Motherfucker: The Life and Movies of Samuel L. Jackson, the Coolest Man in Hollywood; Hachette; October 2021; ISBN 0306924323
- Kindness and Wonder: Why Mister Rogers Matters Now More Than Ever; Dey St.; October 2019; ISBN 978-0062950741
- The World According to Tom Hanks: The Life, the Obsessions, the Good Deeds of America's Most Decent Guy; Grand Central Publishing; October 2018; ISBN 978-1538712207
- The Beautiful Book of Exquisite Corpses: A Creative Game of Limitless Possibilities; Penguin Books, August 2018 ISBN 978-0143132486
- The Tao of Bill Murray: Real-Life Stories of Joy, Enlightenment, and Party Crashing; Random House; September 2016. ISBN 9780812998702
- Can I Say: Living Large, Cheating Death, and Drums Drums Drums (by Travis Barker with Gavin Edwards); HarperCollins; October 2015
- Last Night at the Viper Room: River Phoenix and the Hollywood He Left Behind; It Books; October 2013
- VJ: The Unplugged Adventures of MTV's First Wave (with Nina Blackwood, Mark Goodman, Alan Hunter, Martha Quinn); Atria Books; May 2013
- Is Tiny Dancer Really Elton's Little John?: Music's Most Enduring Mysteries, Myths, and Rumors Revealed; Three Rivers Press; August 2006
- Deck the Halls with Buddy Holly: And Other Misheard Christmas Lyrics; HarperPerennial; October 1998
- When a Man Loves a Walnut: And Even More Misheard Lyrics; Fireside; November 1997
- He's Got the Whole World in his Pants: And More Misheard Lyrics; Fireside; November 1996
- 'Scuse Me While I Kiss This Guy: And Other Misheard Lyrics; Fireside; April 1995
