= History of DJing =

DJing is the act of playing existing recorded music for a live audience.

For the history of radio disc jockeys, see Radio disc jockey history.

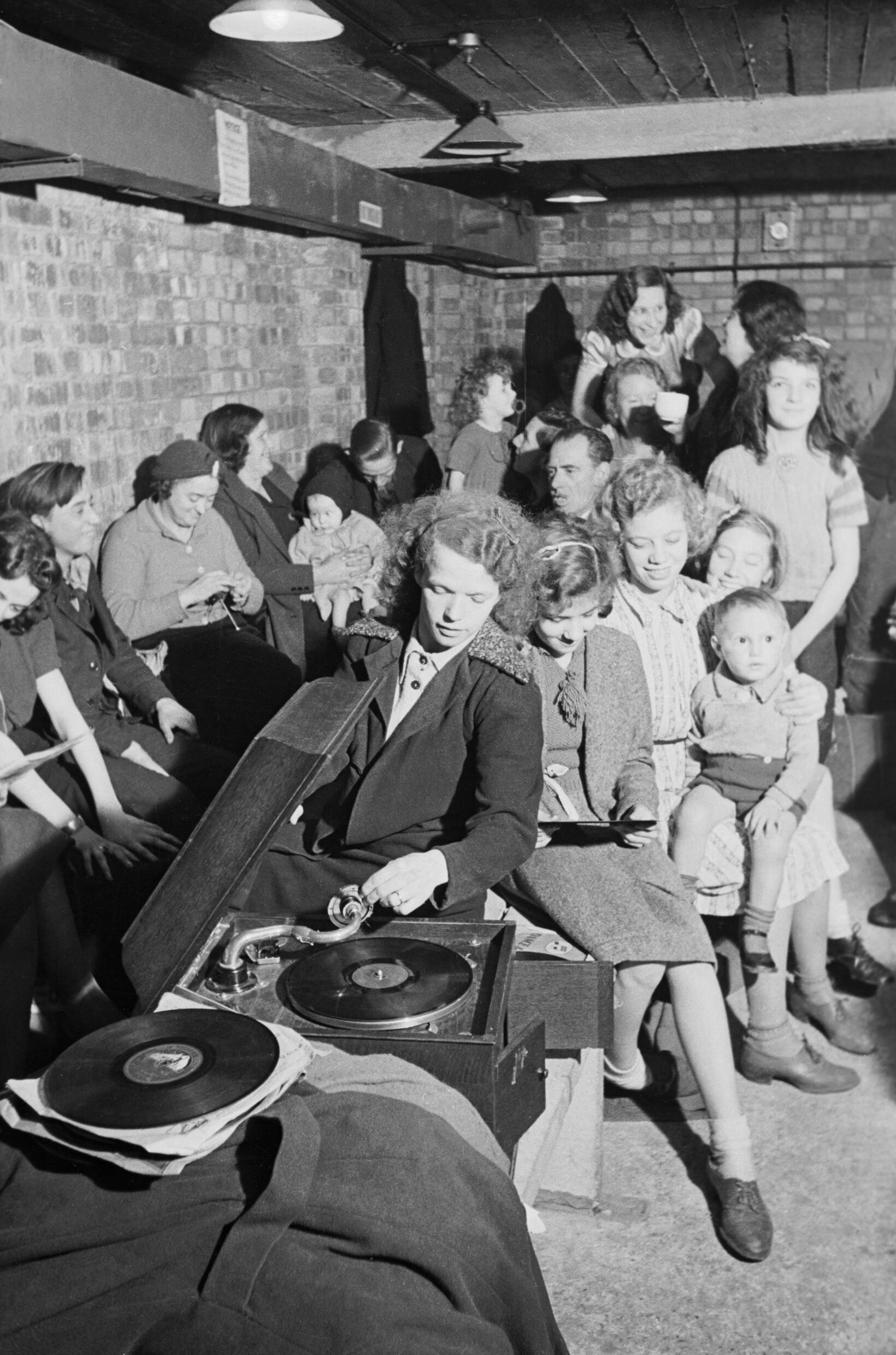
A young woman plays a gramophone in an air raid shelter in North London (1940).

The modern DJ's role as a performer has evolved immensely since its conception. The role originated with radio personalities who would simply select singles to be played over the radio. The contemporary role involves creating a seamless mix of music, generally using two turntables or a digital controller, intended for an audience at a club or dance party.

== 1930s to 1950s ==
In 1935, American radio commentator Walter Winchell coined the term "disc jockey" (the combination of disc, referring to disc-shaped phonograph records, and jockey, which is an operator of a machine) to describe radio announcer Martin Block, the first radio announcer to gain widespread fame for playing popular recorded music over the air.

In 1943, radio DJ Jimmy Savile launched what has been described by later writers as “the world’s first DJ dance party” by playing jazz records in the upstairs function room of the Loyal Order of Ancient Shepherds in Otley, England. However, the accuracy of the claim has been disputed by historians of DJ culture, who note the lack of independent evidence and the existence of earlier examples of record-based dance events. In 1947, he claims to have become the first DJ to use twin turntables for continuous play, and in 1958 became a radio DJ at Radio Luxembourg. Although his claim to have been the first is untrue; twin turntables were illustrated in the BBC Handbook in 1929 and advertised for sale in Gramophone magazine in 1931. In 1947, the Whiskey à Go-Go nightclub opened in Paris, France, considered to be the world's first commercial discothèque, or disco (deriving its name from the French word meaning a nightclub where the featured entertainment is recorded music rather than an on-stage band). Regine began playing on two turntables there in 1953. Discos began appearing across Europe and the United States.

In the 1950s, American radio DJs appeared live at sock hops and "platter parties" and assumed the role of a human jukebox. They typically played 45-rpm records, featuring hit singles on one turntable while talking between songs. In some cases, a live drummer was hired to play beats between songs to maintain the dance floor. In 1955, Bob Casey, a well-known "sock hop" DJ, brought the two-turntable system to the U.S. In the Black community, Stations such as WLAC in Nashville began playing rhythm and blues records, and in 1948, Memphis radio station WDIA began its transition to an all-Black format. The following year, Atlanta's WERD became the nation's first Black-owned and programmed radio station. Beginning in the early 1940s African Americans would congregate in their local parks, known as "Park Jams," where they would play Jazz, blues and gospel records. In the late 1950s, sound systems, a new form of public entertainment, were developed in the ghettos of Kingston, Jamaica. Promoters, who called themselves DJs, threw large parties in the streets that centered on the disc jockey, called the "selector", who played dance music from large, loud PA systems and bantered over the music with a boastful, rhythmic chanting style called "toasting". These parties quickly became profitable for the promoters, who sold admission, food, and alcohol, leading to fierce competition between DJs for the biggest sound systems and newest records.

== 1960s and 1970s ==
In the mid-1960s, nightclubs and discothèques continued to grow in Europe and the United States. Specialized DJ equipment, such as Rudy Bozak's classic CMA-10-2DL mixer, began to appear on the market. In 1969, American club DJ Francis Grasso popularized beatmatching at New York's Sanctuary nightclub. At the same time 1970 David Mancuso opened the loft after going to rent parties in Harlem the mid late sixties with Dr. Tim Leary. David's idea was that the music be as close to the source as possible and did not use a mixer. "Mixing" or "Beatmatching" is the technique of creating seamless transitions between records with matching beats, or tempos. Grasso also developed slip-cuing, a technique long used in radio, where holding a record still while the turntable is revolving underneath and releasing it at the desired moment created a sudden transition from the previous record. On the other side of Ny was a club Called Galaxy 21 that opened its doors in 1971 with a mixer dj known as Walter Gibbons, Joey Madonia and a young drummer named Francois Kevorkian. Walter Gibbons who along with mixers such as Tom Moutlon developed the first 12-inch (300 mm) Disco Single and the extended versions were born. (Chris Aquilo)

Mexican born Agustin Martinez, resident of the famous Acapulco "Tequila a Go-Go" Nightclub, has been credited with being the first Club DJ that mixed tracks and edited them live in 1964. A new club in Acapulco was founded a few years later called "Armando's Le Club".

By 1968, the number of dance clubs started to decline; most American clubs either closed or were transformed into clubs featuring live bands. Neighborhood block parties that were modeled after Jamaican sound systems gained popularity in Europe and in the boroughs of New York City.

In 1970 BBC Radio 1 employs the first ever female radio DJ Annie Nightingale. She remains the longest-serving presenter at BBC to this day. In honor of Nightingale a scholarship was set up with her name for female and non-binary DJ's.

In 1973, Jamaican-born DJ Kool Herc, widely regarded as the "father of hip-hop culture," performed at block parties in his Bronx neighborhood and developed a technique of mixing back and forth between two identical records to extend the rhythmic instrumental segment, or break. Turntablism, the art of using turntables not only to play music but to manipulate sound and create original music, began to develop.

In 1972, Technics released the first SL-1200 turntable, which evolved into the SL-1200 MK2 in 1979—which, as of the early-2010s, remains an industry standard for DJing. In 1974, German electronic music band Kraftwerk released the 22-minute song "Autobahn," which takes up the entire first side of the album of the same title. Years later, Kraftwerk became a significant influence on hip-hop artists such as Afrika Bambaataa and house music pioneer Frankie Knuckles. During the mid-1970s, Hip-hop music and culture began to emerge, originating among urban African Americans and Latinos in New York City. The four main elements of Hip Hop culture are graffiti, DJing, b-boying, and MCing (rapping).

In the mid-1970s, the soul-funk blend of dance pop known as disco took off in the mainstream pop charts in the United States and Europe, causing discothèques to experience a rebirth. Unlike many late-1960s clubs, which featured live bands, discothèques used the DJ's selection and mixing of records as the entertainment. In 1975, record pools began, providing disc jockeys access to newer music from the industry in an efficient method.

In 1975, hip-hop DJ Grand Wizard Theodore invented the scratching technique by accident. In 1976, American DJ, editor, and producer Walter Gibbons remixed "Ten Percent" by Double Exposure, one of the earliest commercially released 12-inch (300 mm) singles (a.k.a. "maxi-single"). In 1979, the Sugar Hill Gang released "Rapper's Delight", the first hip-hop record to become a hit.

In 1977, Saratoga Springs, NY disc jockey Tom L. Lewis introduced the Disco Bible (later renamed Disco Beats), which published hit disco songs listed by beats per minute (tempo), as well as by either artist or song title. Billboard ran an article on the new publication, and it went national relatively quickly. The list made it easier for beginning DJs to learn how to create seamless transitions between songs without dancers having to change their rhythm on the dance floor. Today, DJs can find the beats per minute of songs in the BPM List.

== 1980s ==
In 1981, the cable television network MTV was launched, originally devoted to music videos, especially popular rock music. The term "video jockey", or VJ, was used to describe the fresh-faced youth who introduced the music videos. The first group of MTV video jockeys, otherwise known as “VJs” was Mark Goodman, Martha Quinn, Alan Hunter, J.J Jackson and Nina Blackwood. Martha Quinn is an American actress and radio show host that has been named as “MTV’s Best-Ever VJ” in Rolling Stone. Nina Blackwood, another member of the original VJs is also an actress and model, known for her pronounced raspy voice. In 1982, the demise of disco in the mainstream by the summer of 1982 forced many nightclubs to either close or change entertainment styles, such as by providing MTV-style video dancing or live bands.

Released in 1982, the song "Planet Rock" by DJ Afrika Bambaataa was one of the first hip-hop songs to feature synthesizers. The song melded electro hip-hop beats influenced by Yellow Magic Orchestra with the melody from Kraftwerk's "Trans-Europe Express." Suzanne Ciani, was the first female synth player and was given the title “America’s first female synth hero”. Ciani is a five time Grammy Nominee and her most popular solo album is “The Velocity of Love”. In 1982, the Compact Disc reached the public market in Asia, and early the following year in other markets. This event is often seen as the "Big Bang" of the digital audio revolution.

In the early 1980s, NYC disco DJ Larry Levan, known for his electric mixes, gained a cult following, and the Paradise Garage, the nightclub at which he spun, became the prototype for the modern dance club where the music and the DJ were showcased. Around the same time, the disco-influenced electronic style of dance music called house music emerged in Chicago. The name was derived from the Warehouse Club in Chicago, where resident DJ Frankie Knuckles mixed old disco classics and Eurosynth pop. House music is essentially disco music with electronic drum machine beats. The common element of most house music is a 4/4 beat generated by a drum machine or other electronic means (such as a sampler), together with a solid (usually also electronically generated) synth bassline. In 1983, Jesse Saunders released what some consider the first house music track, "On & On." Kym Mazelle, also known as the “first lady of house music” has been called a trailblazer for house music in the United Kingdom and Europe, working with artists such as Mick Jagger and Chaka Khan. The mid-1980s also saw the emergence of New York Garage, a house music hybrid that was inspired by Levan's style and sometimes eschewed the accentuated high-hats of the Chicago house sound.

During the mid-1980s, techno music emerged from the Detroit club scene. Being geographically located between Chicago and New York, Detroit techno artists combined elements of Chicago house and New York garage along with European imports. Techno distanced itself from disco's roots by becoming almost purely electronic with synthesized beats. In 1985, the Winter Music Conference started in Fort Lauderdale Florida and became the premier electronic music conference for dance music disc jockeys. Kelli Hand or “K-Hand” was a Detroit DJ who performed and produced techno music in Detroit night clubs throughout her lifetime. In 2017 Hand was named “The First Lady of Detroit Techno'' by the Detroit City Council and is credited with changing the techno industry to be more inclusive to women.

In 1985, TRAX Dance Music Guide was launched by American Record Pool in Beverly Hills. It was the first national DJ-published music magazine, created on the Macintosh computer using extensive music market research and early desktop publishing tools. In 1986, "Walk This Way", a rap/rock collaboration by Run DMC and Aerosmith, became the first hip-hop song to reach the Top 10 on the Billboard Hot 100. This song was the first exposure of hip-hop music, as well as the concept of the disc jockey as band member and artist, to many mainstream audiences. In 1988, DJ Times magazine was first published. It was the first US-based magazine specifically geared toward the professional mobile and club DJ.

== 1990s ==
During the early 1990s, acid house provided the foundation for a burgeoning rave scene to flourish. The rave scene changed the face of dance music, the image of DJs, and the nature of promoting. The innovative marketing surrounding the rave scene created the first wave of superstar DJs who established marketable "brands" around their names and sound. Some of these celebrity DJs toured around the world and were able to branch out into other music-related activities. During the early 1990s, the Compact Disc surpassed the gramophone record in popularity, but gramophone records continued to be made (although in very limited quantities) into the 21st century—particularly for club DJs and for local acts recording on small regional labels.

In 1991, Mobile Beat magazine, geared specifically toward mobile DJs, began publishing and in their premier edition featured award-winning club & Mobile DJ Chris Pangalos from Rolling Thunder Productions. Pangalos was also featured in the April 1993 edition of DJ Times magazine as well.

In 1992, the Moving Picture Experts Group released the MPEG-1. A standard designed to produce reasonable sound quality at low bit rates. The lossy compression scheme MPEG-1 Layer-3, popularly known as MP3, later revolutionized the digital music domain. In 1993, the first internet "radio station", Internet Talk Radio, was developed by Carl Malamud. Because the audio was relayed over the internet, it was possible to access internet radio stations from anywhere in the world. This made it a popular service for both amateur and professional disc jockeys operating from a personal computer.

In 1997 the DJ collective "Sister SF" was established. Born in San Francisco "Sister SF" served as the first and longest running women-centered DJ collective in the United States. The collective was created in order to create a space for female DJ's to have a community and support each other in their careers. Access to the same information, performance practices, and spaces that Male DJ's are afforded was also a primary objective of the collective. At its peak in 2005 the collective boasted three chapters, the original in San Francisco and the others in Portland and New York City. The collective lasted up until at least 2009 and has dissolved since, although unclear exactly when.

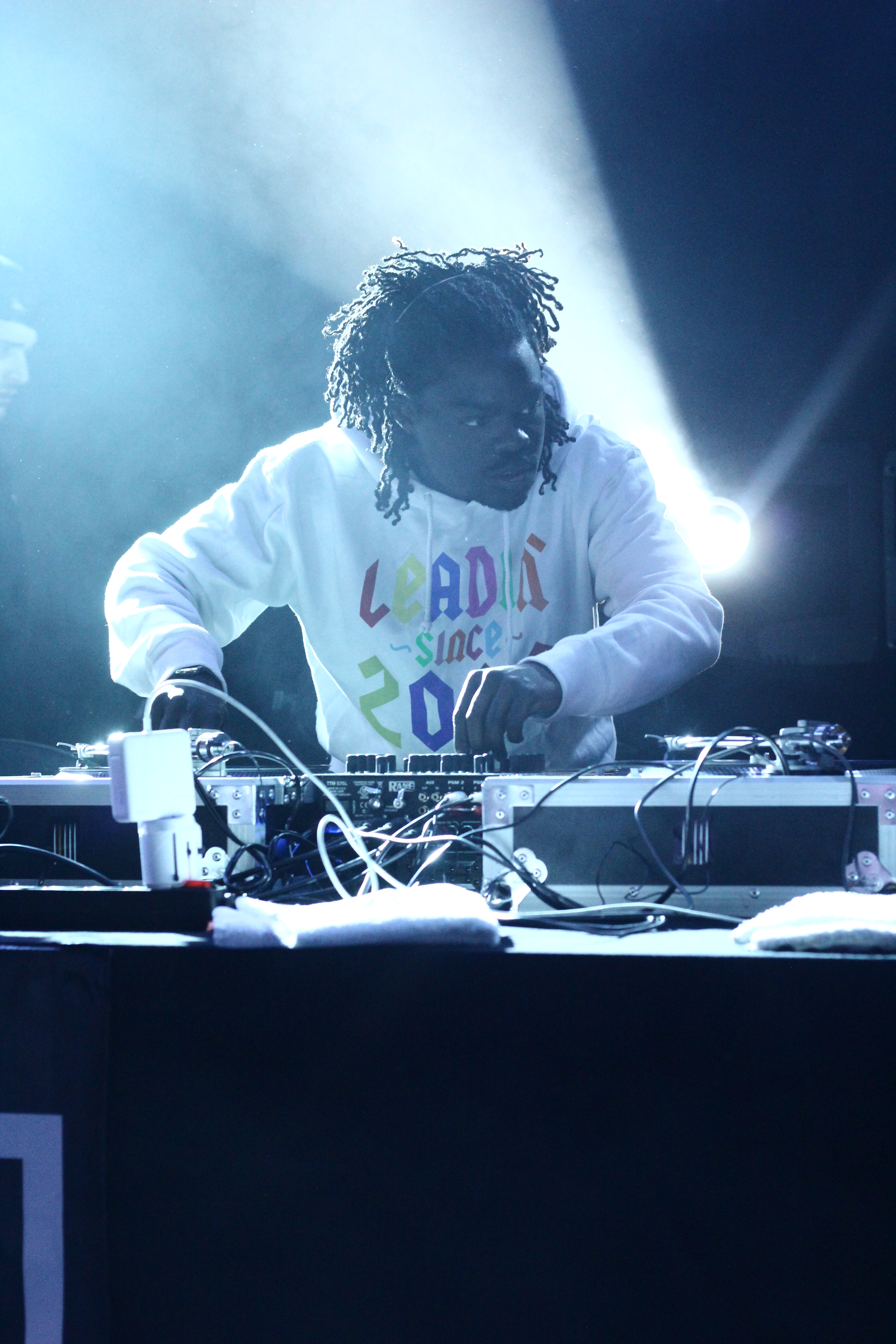
DJ performing with Danny Brown in 2014

In 1998, the first MP3 digital audio player was released, the Eiger Labs MPMan F10. N2IT developed Final Scratch between 1998 and 2002 and showed a non-functioning prototype at the BE Developer Conference, marking the first digital DJ system to allow DJs control of MP3 files through special time-coded vinyl records or CDs. The "Final Scratch" system developed by N2IT shipped its first working units in early 2002 and DJs were spinning on digital vinyl by mid 2002. While it took some time for this novel concept to catch on with the "die hard Vinyl DJs", this soon became the first step in the digital DJ revolution. Manufacturers joined with computer DJing pioneers to offer professional endorsements, the first being Professor Jam (a.k.a. William P. Rader), who went on to develop the industry's first dedicated computer DJ convention and learning program, the "CPS (Computerized Performance System) DJ Summit", to help spread the word about the advantages of this emerging technology.

In 1999, Richard Eden was credited with being one of the first all-digital DJs during a residency at the Mezzanine in Wolverhampton.

In 1999, Shawn Fanning released Napster, the first of the massively popular peer-to-peer file sharing systems. During this period, the AVLA (Audio Video Licensing Agency) of Canada announced an MP3 DJing license, administered by the Canadian Recording Industry Association. This meant that DJs could apply for a license giving them the right to perform publicly using music stored on a hard drive, instead of having to cart their whole CD collections around to their gigs.

== 2000s ==
At the start of the new century, the introduction of advances in technology made it possible for new sounds and new DJ styles to be developed. Pioneer DJ came to be the digital standard. Audio and Video Mixers were developed, bringing the MTV world of the 80s and 90s to the world of DJ personality of the 2000s. New technologies concentrated in analog sound brought another high tech digital era, sound mixers made a whole new culture of DJ integration. These new technologies inspired DJs to merge past music genres and new-age sounds, creating alternative genres based on music from the 80s and 90s. One of the DJs at the forefront of mixing new technology with older, more nostalgic sounds was Miss Kitten. She was known for her “'80s-inspired synth-pop and Italo-disco influence” and unique party music. She released a set called First Album with The Hacker, a fun spin on 80's dance music with comical lyrics and a carefree vibe. In the 2000s, EDM found its way into pop music and became somewhat mainstream. Artists and DJs like NERVO and David Guetta, who both co-wrote the Grammy-winning song “When Love Takes Over” featuring Kelly Rowland, were big names in the industry and played a role in integrating EDM with pop music. Experimentation with music and technology continued with artists such as Björk, who combines music producing and DJing and creates microbeats by using small everyday sounds on her album, Vespertine. She introduced this as a new method of DJing music in 2001.

DJs were more virtual than ever. This means that mixtapes flooded the online world and there was a boom in the number of DJs. This boom also meant DJs began to merge and network with classic DJs. The proliferation of Internet technologies have also created a culture of disc jockey enthusiast groups who proliferated social and mass media groups, however, the DJ culture has kept its underground essence in most metropolitan cities.

== 2010s ==
DJing continues to move into the mainstream. SoundCloud, a streaming platform intended for independent artists to distribute their music, is created and launched. It reached 1 million users in May 2010. Music becomes easier to stream with Spotify being introduced to the United States in July 2011, opening people to more music of their choice. Dubstep begins to become a huge part of DJing in 2010 as Rusko's "Woo Boost" brings it into more mainstream music. Socialite Paris Hilton is inspired by music in Ibiza and begins her DJing career in June 2012, later being named one of Forbes' richest DJ in 2016. Ibiza is a huge inspiration for 2010's DJs in general, with Nancy Noise using Ibiza as inspiration to help start the acid house movement in England. DJing is completely mobile in 2013 when Traktor DJ is now available on iPhones. Many companies use DJs as events to add to ambiance. This is how Nikki Pennie ("the British Bardot") got her start as a DJ when fashion events wanted to start using DJs as their source of music in 2013. She was trained by Dave Garnish and began working for Jimmy Choo, H&M, Dior, and other fashion companies.

Festivals like Coachella and Lollapalooza become huge places for DJs to perform. In 2018 Alison Wonderland, an Australian DJ, became the highest billed female DJ in Coachella history.

The 2010s began what the 2020s would know as the Electronic Dance Music (EDM) movement. Artists like Swedish House Mafia, Tiësto, and LCD Soundsystem bring EDM into the 2010s mainstream scene. EDM festival L.A. Coliseum home, now known as Electric Daisy Carnival, had its best selling year at the time in 2010.
