= '60s Gold =

Sirius XM satellite radio channel

- Broadcast area: United States; Canada
- Frequencies: Sirius XM Radio 73; DISH Network 6006

Programming
- Format: 1960s pop music

Ownership
- Owner: Sirius XM Radio

History
- First air date: September 25, 2001
- Former names: '60s on 6
- Former frequencies: Sirius XM Radio 6

Technical information
- Class: Satellite Radio Station

Links
- Website: SiriusXM: '60s Gold

'60s Gold, formerly known as The '60s on 6 or The '60s, is a commercial-free, satellite radio station on the Sirius XM Radio platform. It plays music from the 1960s. Airing on XM since 2001, the channel became available to Sirius subscribers replacing '60s Vibrations on November 12, 2008, following the merger of the two companies. The station currently broadcasts on channel 73 of both services, as well as on Dish Network channel 6073.

Like the other decades channels, '60s Gold works to recreate the feel of 1960s radio. They use similar DJs, classic PAMS jingles, period slang, and news updates. The channel was also used for XM's annual rock and roll hits music chronology, IT.

The logo features a Peace sign for the zero.

The '60s on 6 was the fifth most listened to station on the XM service, with a cume of 581,300 listeners per week, according to Arbitron analysis in 2008.

== Post Sirius XM merger ==
With the merger of many Sirius XM channels on November 12, 2008, there were some changes to 60s on 6. The channel's playlist, which had once exceeded 3,000 songs was sliced to emphasize Top 10 hits more, with most of the lower-charting tracks as well as many of the crossover and novelty hits of the era removed and abandoned from the rotation. Pat Clarke, who helmed the channel since the 2004 departure of Program Director and channel creator, Cleveland Wheeler, was dismissed along with another disk jockey, Marty "with the Party" Thompson. Phlash Phelps and Terry "Motormouth" Young were spared, and "Broadway" Bill Lee and Mike Kelly joined the airstaff. Lee eventually moved to the '70s on 7 channel. Cousin Brucie began a live Saturday all-request show. Wolfman Jack was moved into an early afternoon block, and was eventually eliminated altogether, along with other channel fixtures such as the Sonic Sound Salute, Sweet Sixteen Music Machine countdown, and Chickenman.

The classic PAMS jingles were edited to remove references to XM Radio, or jingles not referencing XM were used. In the summer of 2009, PAMS produced a new set of jingles based on its Series 31, "Music Explosion" for the channel.

Prior to the merger, it was the only XM channel to not change its zero in the logo, since it has always been a peace sign. All decades channels changed logos, whereas this channel, along with the '40s on 4 and the '70s on 7 are updated logos from their predecessors. The last logo for The '60s on 6 was the same, but "The" is phased out on the left, and adds the "on 6" info at the right.

In October 2021, SiriusXM announced that the station would move to channel 73 on November 3, and its name would simultaneously change to '60s Gold.

== Notable hosts ==
- Cousin Brucie
- Phlash Phelps
- Pat St. John
- "Shotgun Tom" Kelly
- Tommy James
- Peter Noone

== Core artists ==
- The Beatles
- The Beach Boys
- The Four Seasons
- The Rolling Stones
- The Supremes
- Simon & Garfunkel
- Hermans Hermits
- Four Tops
- The Monkees
- Neil Diamond
- Aretha Franklin
