= '50s Gold =

Sirius XM satellite radio channel

- Broadcast area: United States; Canada
- Frequencies: Sirius XM Radio 72; DISH Network 6005

Programming
- Format: Mid 1950s - early 1960s music

Ownership
- Owner: Sirius XM Radio

History
- First air date: September 25, 2001
- Former names: '50s on 5
- Former frequencies: Sirius XM Radio 5

Technical information
- Class: Satellite Radio Station

Links
- Website: SiriusXM: '50s Gold

'50s Gold (formerly The '50s on 5 or just The '50s) is a commercial-free, satellite radio station on Sirius XM Radio channel 72, as well as on Dish Network channel 6005.

From 2001 to 2008, the program director for XM's The '50s on 5 was Ken Smith, and its music director was Matt "the Cat" Baldassarri. Both men were dismissed from the channel in October 2008 following XM's merger with former rival Sirius. On November 12, 2008, The '50s on 5 was added to the Sirius platform, replacing the Sirius Gold channel.

Similar to the other decades-themed channels, '50s Gold attempts to recreate the feel of 1950s radio. It uses similar DJ habits, jingles, period slang, and news updates. The channel was also used for XM's annual Pop Music music chronology, IT. However, unlike most satellite radio stations which play songs solely from a specific decade, the lineup of songs on '50s Gold is mostly from 1954 to 1963, a decade that spans from the start of the rock and roll era to immediately before the British Invasion. 40s Junction carries the early 1950s playlist alongside the late 1930s and 1940s music.

In early 2014, Sirius removed the disc jockeys from The '50s on 5, and also from '90s on 9, in an apparent cost-cutting move. Pat St. John was one of the dismissed DJs.

As of 2020, 50s on 5 carries some limited hosted programming, including a show by Pat Boone, In the Key of Neil with Neil Sedaka, the terrestrially syndicated Cool Bobby B's Doo Wop Stop, and The Pink And Black Days with Alex Ward.

In October 2021, SiriusXM announced that the station would move to channel 72 on November 3, and that its name would simultaneously change to 50s Gold.

== Core artists ==
- Elvis Presley
- Fats Domino
- Chuck Berry
- Ricky Nelson
- Buddy Holly
- Everly Brothers
- Little Richard
- Perry Como
- The Platters
- Connie Francis
- Jerry Lee Lewis
