= '80s on 8 =

Sirius XM satellite radio channel

The '80s on 8
- Broadcast area: United States; Canada
- Frequencies: Sirius XM Radio 8 Dish Network 6008

Programming
- Format: 1980s Music

Ownership
- Owner: Sirius XM Radio

History
- First air date: September 25, 2001

Technical information
- Class: Satellite Radio Station

Links
- Website: SiriusXM: '80s on 8

Former XM logo as The '80s, used prior to Sirius/XM merger on November 12, 2008.

'80s on 8 (also known as The Big '80s on 8) is a commercial-free, satellite radio station on Sirius XM Radio channel 8 and also Dish Network 6008. As a result of the Sirius/XM merger on November 12, 2008, the channel was merged with the Big '80s channel on Sirius 8, and took its current name. The channel plays hit music from the 1980s.

The channel was created in 2000/2001 and programmed by veteran radio program director and morning drive/afternoon personality Bruce Kelly, whose morning show was one of XM's highest rated programs, until 2005. It is currently voice-tracked by the four living original MTV VJs: Nina Blackwood, Mark Goodman, Alan Hunter and Martha Quinn (part-time), all of whom record their programs from their homes. There are no live announcers at any time on this channel.

Much like the other decade channels, '80s on 8 attempts to recreate the feel of 1980s radio. It uses JAM Creative Productions' "Warp Factor", "The Flame Thrower," "Skywave" and "Turbo Z" sound effects (made popular in the '80s by Z100 in New York and other stations) for jingles, as well as similar DJ habits, '80s slang, news updates, and occasional vintage commercial clips. The channel was also used for XM's annual pop music chronology, IT.

In 2008, '80s on 8 was the third-most listened to station on the XM service, with an Arbitron-estimated cume of 698,300 listeners per week.

== Post Sirius XM merger ==
When the merge of XM and Sirius Satellite Radio music and talk channels occurred on November 12, 2008, Rick Stacy was named the channel's program director, and the airstaff consisted of the four surviving original MTV "veejays" - Nina Blackwood, Mark Goodman, Alan Hunter and Martha Quinn, carrying over the lineup of Sirius's Big '80s channel. '80s on 8 was simulcast on both XM and Sirius, and channel imaging was revised to include the phrase "Sirius XM Radio". It also became Sirius XM Radio's first and only channel to phase out the apostrophe (like on most decades channels on Sirius XM), as they changed their logo entirely (other channels such as The 50s on 5 and The 90s on 9 did so, but the rest of the logos were updated). However, with the reintroduction of the VJ big 40, the 80s on 8 is starting to sound more like the Sirius channel The Big 80s, complete with a schedule somehow reminiscent of that channel.

== Replay America Tour ==
On April 26, 2017, it was announced that SiriusXM's '80s on 8 would be presenting the Replay America Tour, offering hits from the 80s. The lineup included the following pop stars from the 80s, who mostly played their best known songs:

- Billy Ocean - This was Billy Ocean's first U.S. tour in 20 years.
- Greg Kihn (on select dates)
- The Motels featuring Martha Davis
- Naked Eyes
- Starship (featuring Mickey Thomas)
- Taylor Dayne

The tour dates and locations were as follows:

- 06/03 - Philadelphia, PA (Private) - Philadelphia Convention Center
- 06/04 - Grand Rapids, MI - Frederik Meijer Gardens & Sculpture Park
- 07/26 - Uncasville, CT - Mohegan Sun
- 07/28 - Staten Island, NY - Richmond Bank Ballpark
- 07/29 - Rochester, NY - The Dome Arena
- 07/30 - Lancaster, PA - Clipper Magazine Stadium
- 08/03 - Westbury, NY - NYCB Theatre at Westbury
- 08/04 - Bowie, MD - Prince George Stadium
- 08/05 - Durham, NC - Athletic Park
- 08/06 - Huber Heights, OH - Rose Music Center at The Heights
- 08/10 - Chattanooga, TN - AT & T Field
- 08/11 - Hickory, NC - L.P. Frans Stadium
- 08/12 - Augusta, GA - Lake Olmstead Stadium
- 08/15 - Albuquerque, NM - Sandia Casino Amphitheater
- 08/16 - Colorado Springs, CO - Broadmoor World Arena
- 08/18 - Crestwood, IL - Standard Bank Ballpark
- 08/19 - South Bend, IN - Coveleski Regional Stadium
- 08/20 - Welch, MN - Treasure Island Resort & Casino

A review of the final show reported that the tour "fulfilled its purpose of taking fans back to seemingly more simple times, with the hit songs they grew up with, and a party-like atmosphere. The chance to see some of these acts might be few and far between, so the opportunity to see them all on the same bill, made for a fun and playful evening."

== Hosts ==
- Mark Goodman
- Nina Blackwood (former, continues to co-Host on VJ Big 40 Countdown)
- Alan Hunter
- Martha Quinn (former; now at KOSF in San Francisco)

== Internet Player ==
The internet version can be biased toward dance pop or toward mainstream rock hits.

With Sirius XM's partnership with Pandora the 80s had subchannels for hits, rock, or dance music.

== Core artists ==
- Madonna
- Michael Jackson
- Prince
- Journey
- Def Leppard
- Hall & Oates
- Duran Duran
- Huey Lewis & The News
- Pat Benatar
- Phil Collins
- Wham!
- Cyndi Lauper
- Culture Club
- Bon Jovi
- The Bangles
- DJ Jazzy Jeff & The Fresh Prince
- Run-DMC
- LL Cool J
- Janet Jackson
