= Phlash Phelps =

American radio personality

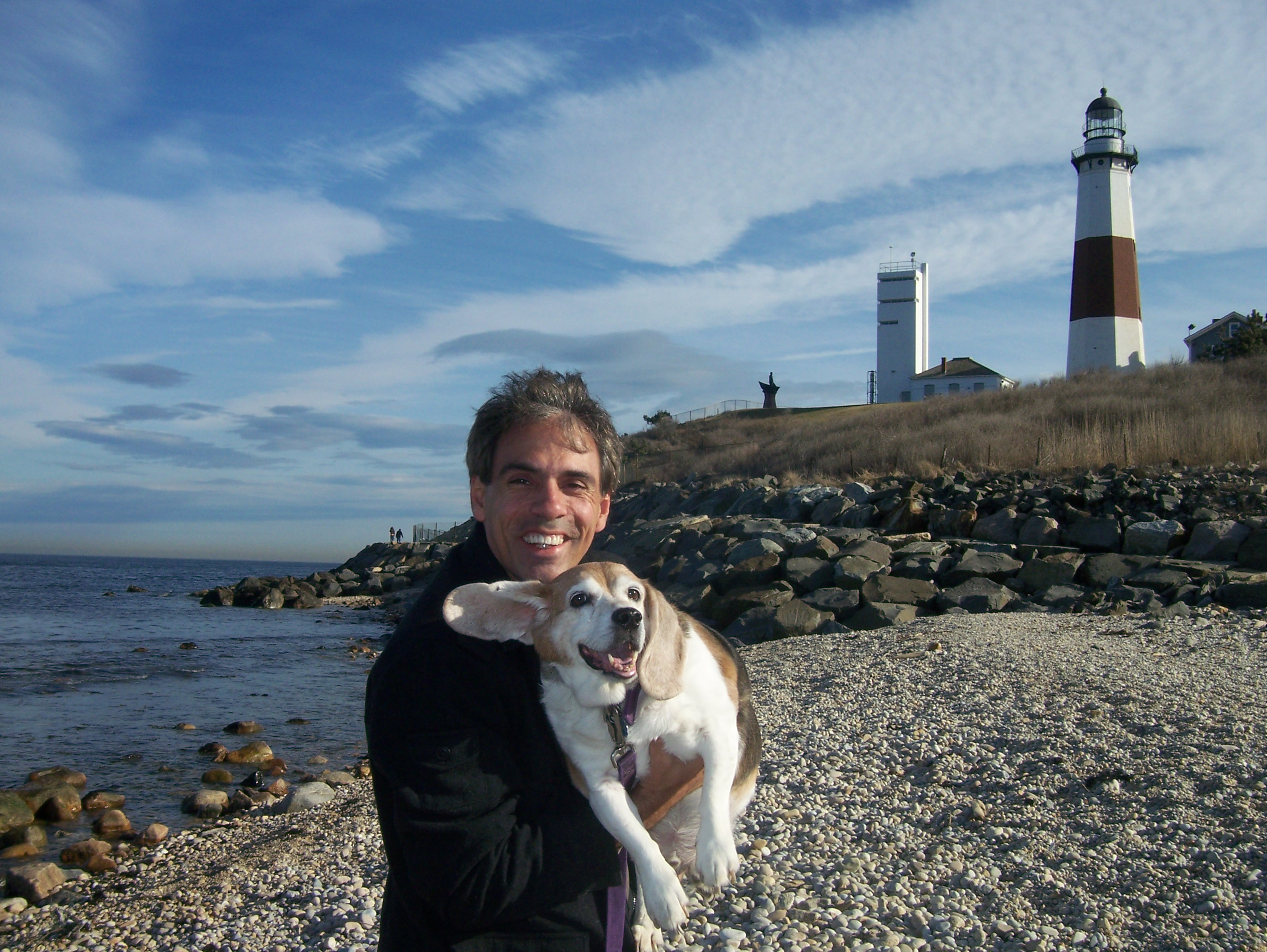
- Phlash with his late dog Clyde in Montauk, New York
- Born: Gordon Phelps; April 11, 1966; Towson, Maryland
- Occupations: Disk jockey, radio personality
- Years active: 1983-present

Gordon "Phlash" Phelps (born April 11, 1966) is a radio personality and disc jockey on Sirius-XM Radio, broadcasting from Washington, D.C. He hosts the weekday morning drive time Phlash Phelps Phunny Pharm on the '60s Gold, channel 73, which plays music hits from the 1960s. He has been with SiriusXM, and before that XM Satellite Radio, since before it went on the air in 2001. Prior to that, Phelps held a number of radio jobs, moving around the country to work in a series of secondary and tertiary markets. He is known for his fast-talking, retro style of broadcasting and for making American geography a focal point of his show.

== Early life and first exposure to radio ==
Born in Towson, Maryland, Phelps grew up in nearby Baltimore City. He has at least one sibling, an older sister. He attended Calvert Hall College High School in Towson.

As a youngster he listened to Casey Kasem and his American Top 40 countdown show and became very knowledgeable about what the current hits were. After winning a station contest he received a tour of the studios of Baltimore's WBSB (B-104); at age 15 he then knew that being a radio personality is what he wanted for a career.

The deejays that influenced Phelps included Baltimore's Johnny Walker on WFBR, with his sound effects and personality-driven style, as well as some of the jocks on B-104. In addition, he listened to Rick Dees and the nationally syndicated Rick Dees Weekly Top 40 countdown show, which included plenty of sound effects and humor. A final influence was the fast-talking Terry "Motormouth" Young, whom he heard on WCAU (98.1) in nearby Philadelphia during its early-mid-1980s Hot Hits phase.

== Different on-air jobs around the country ==
After a potential internship at B-104 in Baltimore fell through, through more contest entries Phelps parlayed his knowledge of current music to the program director at local rival WQSR (Q105) instead, garnering an internship there when he was 17 and still in high school.

Phelps's career began by holding a series of on-air jobs in secondary and tertiary markets. In 1995, after spending five years at WDJB (B-106 FM) in Fort Wayne, Indiana, he joined WSSX (95SX) in Charleston, South Carolina as its morning drive personality.

Phelps is known for travelling around the United States. By the time he was age 23 he had been to 49 states, with his 50th state, Alaska, added at age 29. He has travelled to different radio markets in the country to record the broadcasters.

Phelps created a show that reflected his desire to capture both the craziness of Rick Dees and the fastness of Terry "Motormouth" Young. As the title of the Phlash Phelps Phunny Pharm indicates, a central concept is to replace all instances of the letter 'f' with 'ph'. Thus his fan club was called the Phlash Phelps Phunny Pharm Phan Clan (and years later, listeners would call in and recite what number they were in the club). When he talks about the professional American football league, he refers to the "NPHL" rather than the "NFL"; the 27th state to join the union is "Phlorida", not "Florida", and so forth. The fast talking is exemplified by showing how fast he can recite the letters of the alphabet backwards and similar feats.

By 2000, he was back in Fort Wayne, this time doing mornings for WCKZ (Rhythmic/102.3), before leaving in September 2000 for the East Coast and satellite radio.

== '60s Gold ==
For the '60s Gold Channel on XM Satellite Radio, formerly '60s on 6, which broadcasts from Washington, D.C., Phelps served not only as the most visible host but as music director as well. He was hired on August 21, 2000, more than a full year in advance of the service going on the air on September 21, 2001. He was attractive because of his ability to replicate the madcap 1960s style of deejays; as one XM channel executive said, he was hired because "You're our kind of nut."

Under Phelps's direction, they had a "Power to the People" feature wherein listeners could choose songs that would be played and write stories about what they meant to them.

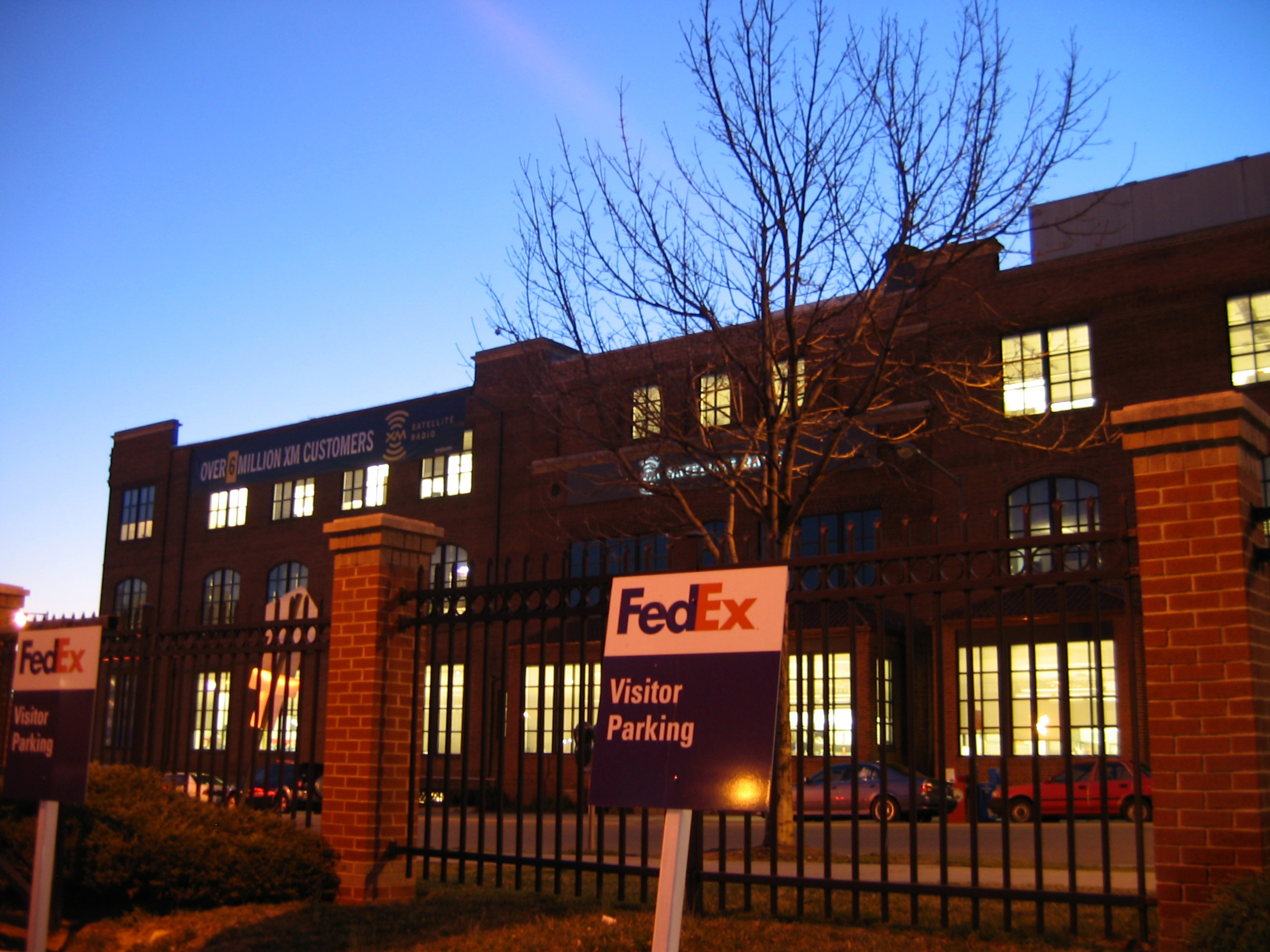
XM Satellite Radio headquarters in Washington, DC, 2006

In September 2003, as part of promoting XM Satellite Radio, Phelps and colleague Kurt Gilchrist, a DJ on the service's companion '70s on 7 channel, embarked on a trip to visit all of the Lower 48 states within 14 days. They broadcast their shows from a customized SUV as the two-year-old service was expecting to soon gain its millionth subscriber. Phelps was also involved in CQ USA, a feature on XM with interactive listener involvement (named after the wireless code), but that ended in 2006.

By the time of the merger of XM with Sirius Satellite Radio in 2008, '60s on 6 was XM's fifth most popular channel. When the merger happened, Phelps was one of the few DJs to come through with his timeslot intact. Phelps stated in 2011 that of the sixteen personalities on the air when XM began in August 2001, he was one of only three remaining. By the 2010s, Phelps's show was being broadcast from Monday through Friday from 6 am - 1 pm.

Phelps's role on radio has gotten him additional employment at times, such as in 2008 when he was named the voice of the Dow Louisiana Federal Credit Union.

By the time he was in his forties, he had visited all 50 states at least twice each. His best friend and traveling companion, Clyde the Beagle, died on January 30, 2010. Phlash reported that he and Clyde had visited all the 48 continental state and he will take Clyde's ashes with him when he visits Alaska and Hawaii. His stated interests are closely related to travel and include driving, taking photographs, and riding rollercoasters (by 2011 he had gone on over 600 different ones).

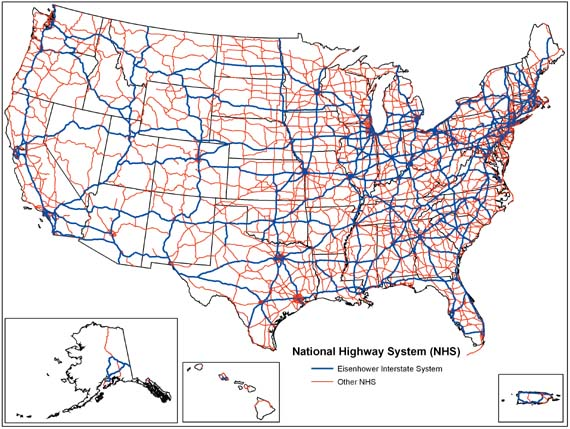
Phlash Phelps makes constant reference to the highways of the United States in his "City of the Day" feature.

Since 2007, his shows have featured a "City of the Day" segment in which he gives indirect clues to some town or city in the United States (or sometimes Canada) and listeners call in with their guesses. The location he picks is usually linked in some fashion with a current event or historical anniversary. Indeed, American geography is a focal point of Phelps's show, which fits in well with satellite radio having a national rather than local audience. Listeners call in from all across the country, with their current or intended location and the roads they are traveling on often being the focus of discussion. Phelps is at ease talking with everyone; as one listener said, "He can speak with the president of a music company or a little old priest from [a small town]." As columnist Jeff Maguire of the Metroland Media Group has written, Phelps's show features "his incredible knowledge of geography and places on this continent. ... There doesn't seem to be a single nook or cranny in the U.S. or Canada that he hasn't visited." When he is off and a replacement is on-air, it is usually because he is out driving again.

In 2014, to celebrate his 14 years on satellite radio, frequent listener and former Senator and Governor from Idaho and Secretary of the Interior Dirk Kempthorne had the American flag flown over the United States Capitol dome in his honor. By the 2010s his on-air manner was considerably calmer than in the past, although he occasionally featured one of his fast-talking bits.

There is also a thoroughbred racehorse called Phlash Phelps, named following an on-air suggestion by Phelps that he would like a horse named after him just like his colleague Cousin Brucie had. The equine Phlash Phelps had a strong season on Maryland racetracks in 2015 as a four-year-old, culminating in a win in the Maryland Million Turf at Pimlico Race Course. He lost his attempt to defend that title in 2016, however, although still was a winning horse in other races, while his 2017 season was cut short by injury.

In April 2016, when Phelps turned 50 years old, he began a plan to visit all 50 states again within the space of a year. The venture gained enough publicity that the Lamar Advertising Company erected a billboard on Interstate 81 in Pennsylvania off an exit in Scranton to honor Phelps, who made the state second on his list. By mid-late June he had already been to 30 states; he said, "Usually every weekend I’m gone. I’ve been traveling 1,800 miles a week". By early December he had been to 48, with only Florida and Hawaii remaining. In January 2017 Phlash Phelps finished his quest, announcing "All 50 at 50 completed in 9 mths & 4 days with only 3 phlights and over 70,000 miles driven since April 11, 2016. Aloha phrom Molokai, HI."
