= IT (radio program) =

Program that XM Satellite Radio aired annually

"IT: The History of Pop Music" is a program that XM Satellite Radio aired annually from 2002 to 2007, in which a majority of charted pop songs (and some non-charted songs) from the 1930s to the 2000s were aired in chronological order on seven of the platform's channels (The 40s on 4, The 50s on 5, The 60s on 6, The 70s on 7, The 80s on 8, The 90s on 9, and Pop2K (formerly XM Hitlist)). The special typically aired each summer or fall, starting on the '40s channel and continuing on each subsequent channel as the music hit each decade. The special took just over a month to complete. After completion, playlists for each of the channels were put on XM's website, with the songs listed in the order in which they were played (in 2007, one large list was put up on the website, with the songs organized by year, but in alphabetical order instead of chronological order).

"IT" first aired on XM in 2002, when it was originally known as "The Monster". The special was renamed the following year, apparently due to legal action against the first name. In 2007, in addition to the regular "IT", XM also aired an abbreviated version (titled "The Greatest ITs") on their XMX channel during Thanksgiving weekend. The Greatest ITs was reaired in early November 2008, although XM did not air the regular "IT" that year, allegedly due to issues surrounding XM's merger with rival Sirius Satellite Radio. It is unclear if either version of "IT" will reair in the future.

The following is an overview of "IT" for each of the channels.

== The 40s on 4 ==
"IT" began on the '40s channel by playing many of the big hits from 1930 through 1949. Starting in 2006, "IT" was preceded by a 3-hour special titled "The Roaring '20s Pre-It Special", featuring some of the biggest hits from the 1920s, some of which had never been played on XM before. Total running time in 2006 (not including the "Pre-It Special"): 3 days, 15 hours.

== The 50s on 5 ==
"IT" on the '50s channel featured many big hits from 1950 through 1959. The channel also included early non-charted songs from Elvis Presley and other rock and roll and rhythm and blues artists. Total running time in 2006: 2 days, 12 hours.

== The 60s on 6 ==
"IT" on the '60s channel featured most of the charted Top 40 hits from 1960 through 1969. Many non-Top 40 Beatles songs are also included, as well as other lower-charting songs that failed to reach the Top 40 but have subsequently become iconic of the decade (such as "Purple Haze"). Total running time in 2006: 5 days, 6 hours.

== The 70s on 7 ==
"IT" on the '70s channel featured nearly every Top 40 charted hit from 1970 through 1979, in addition to songs that just missed the Top 40 and some non-charting and low-charting songs (such as "Stairway to Heaven", "Truckin'", and "Candle in the Wind"). Total running time in 2006: 6 days, 12 hours.

== The 80s on 8 ==
"IT" on the 80s channel contained a mix of Top 40 and non-Top 40 songs from 1980 through 1989. Unlike the previous two decades channels, many lesser Top 40 hits were omitted, and there were many more non-Top 40 songs included. The 2007 version also was plagued with many technical problems, including some songs being played out of order or repeated several times. Total running time in 2006: 6 days, 6 hours.

== The 90s on 9 ==
"IT" on the '90s channel included Top 40 and non-Top 40 hits from 1990 through 1999. In 2006, the '90s channel also included songs from 2000 through 2006, though these songs were moved to XM Hitlist in 2007. "IT" on the '90s channel also differed from the other decades channels in that songs were arranged by the date they peaked on the charts, as opposed to the date they debuted on the charts. Total running time in 2006: 9 days, 8 hours.

== Y2K ==
"IT" on XM30 (the XM Hitlist channel) included Top 40 and non-Top 40 hits from 2000 and after in chronological order. 2007 was the first and only year that XM included this channel in the "IT" presentation. Many of the post-2000 songs that were played on the '90s channel during 2006's airing of "IT" were omitted in 2007 (particularly country and hip hop songs that did not receive mainstream radio exposure). Since 2008, XM Hitlist reformatted as an all-2000s station Pop2K.
