= Top 20 on 20 =

- Frequencies: Sirius XM Radio 3 Dish Network 6003

Programming
- Format: Top 40

Ownership
- Owner: SiriusXM Radio

History
- First air date: September 25, 2001
- Last air date: July 17, 2014
- Former frequencies: XM 20; DirecTV channel 816

Top 20 on 20 (or just 20 on 20) was a commercial-free, interactive hit music satellite radio station. It was on channel 3 (previously 20) on Sirius XM Radio. The channel played everything new from rock to rap, with the songs chosen by online votes to the XM website. One could also vote their favorite songs by calling the station number (866-553-2020), or text messaging. Sirius XM Love moved from Sirius 3, XM 23 and Dish Network 6003 to Sirius XM Radio 17 and Dish Network 6017 as part of the May 4 channel lineup.

== Format ==
The channel was completely automated by listener voting with no DJ interruption. Former DJs on 20 on 20 include Priestly (evenings) and Michelle (PM drive); both were previously DJs on The 90s on 9 (Michelle was then known as "Girl 2.0"). Occasionally Michelle hosted "The Meltdown with Michelle" in which she spoke with a currently popular artist. Both jocks moved to XM's new CHR station, XM Hitlist (now Pop2K), at the same timeslots. In November 2006, both DJs moved back to XM20. The channel also used to host a multi-weekly top 20 countdown for rock music, but that has since been taken over by the full-time rock channels. SquiZZ had its own similar countdown show on Saturdays.

== History ==
On December 4, 2006, 20 on 20 was relaunched. Among the changes included a cut in the countdowns by 50 percent, adding live DJ's throughout the day including the return of Priestly and Michelle, and having celebrity countdowns on Fridays at 9 pm Eastern.

The station, according to Arbitron measurements, was the most listened-to station on the XM service, with an estimated 1,050,000 listeners per week.

On March 15, 2007, Top 20 on 20 was added to the Sirius line-up; it was only available through the internet. In June 2009, Sirius XM Hits 1 programming began simulcasting on XM 20 On 20 from 9 p.m. to noon Eastern. The station was announced on both signals as Sirius XM Hits 1 On 20 on 20. By September 2009, the channel was removed from Mediabase's reporting panel, and aired music mostly sourced from Sirius XM Hits 1; however, the channel's programming was still different from Sirius XM Hits 1.

Until February 9, 2010, Sirius XM Hits 1 and Top 20 on 20 was heard on DirecTV channel 816 until DirecTV has stopped carrying SiriusXM programming and replaced it with another music service called Sonic Tap by DMX.

It was announced on January 4, 2012, the Reggie Yates Chart Show will be broadcast starting January 15, 2012, and every Sunday there after from BBC Radio 1 starting at 4 pm Eastern.

On May 4, 2011, Top 20 on 20 became its own channel once again, playing a mix of both top 40 and hip-hop hits sounding similar to Sirius XM Hits 1. It also became available to Sirius subscribers on channel 3 and Dish Network channel 6003. It has been repositioned as a "pop music discovery" outlet, playing new songs that are potential future hits, in complement to Hits 1 which plays mostly established hits.

On July 10, 2014, Sirius XM announced that on the 17th, 20 on 20 will be replaced on Channel 3 by Venus. The new station will focus on Rhythmic pop hits from the 21st Century with core artists including Beyonce, Britney Spears, Christina Aguilera and Black Eyed Peas.

The final song played on 20 on 20 was "Who's That Chick" by David Guetta feat. Rihanna. "My Humps" by The Black Eyed Peas followed after as the first song on Venus. 20 on 20 was replaced by Venus at 12:04 am on July 17, 2014.
