= Resident DJ =

DJ who works regularly at the same club

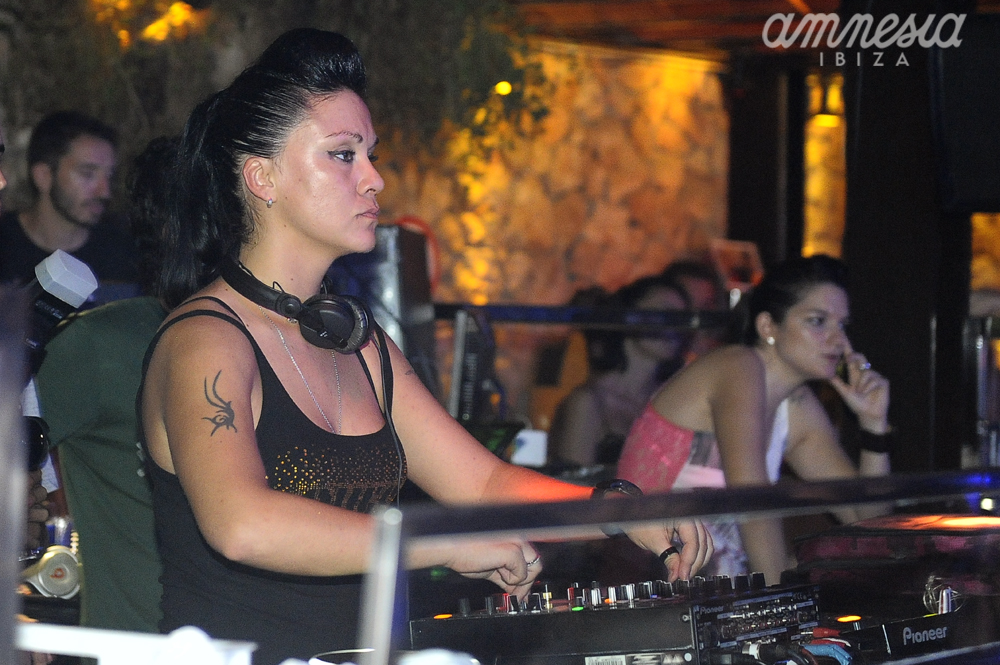
Lydia Sanz, resident DJ at Amnesia Ibiza

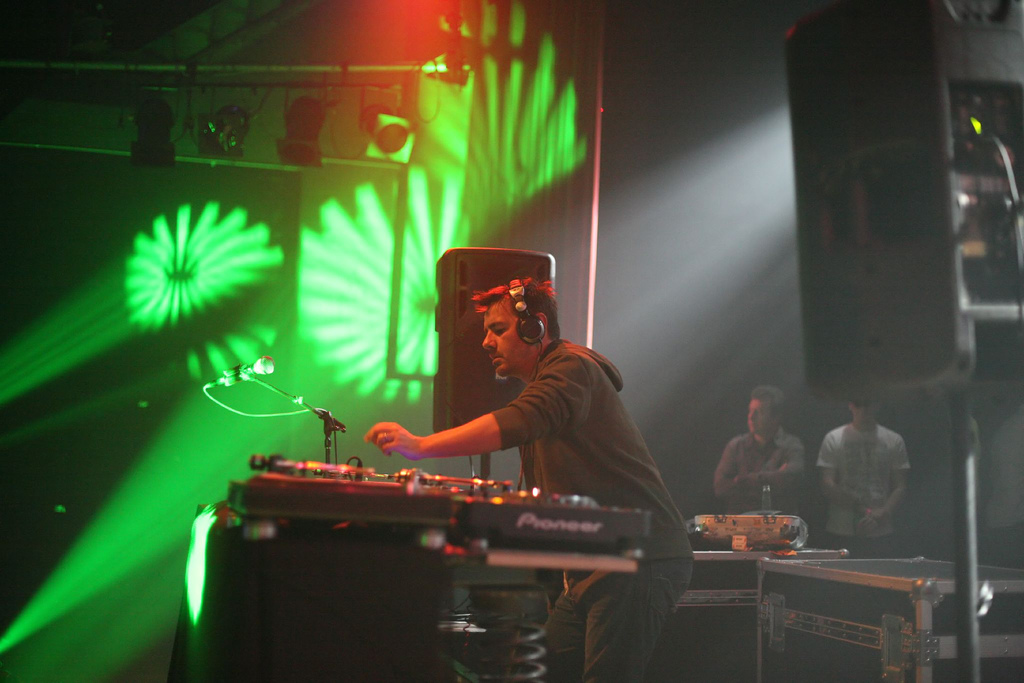
Laurent Garnier, French producer and DJ, who started out playing at the Rex Club in Paris

In the DJ culture, a resident DJ or local DJ is a DJ who is employed by a dance club, unlike a guest artist, who works as freelancer and therefore play at several clubs. Obtaining a residency implies being part of the salaried staff of a company.

== History ==
In the early ages of clubbing, when the first "underground" nightclubs were formed in the 70s and 80s fixed hiring was the most common practice of signing DJs, so they were all residents. The culture of electronic music and DJing emerged in the large industrialized cities of the Anglo-Saxon countries, the United Kingdom and the United States. Later, the DJ profession became popular and diversified, and changed the paradigm to a form of freelance employment.

By the early 1990s the network of commercial raves and rave-style clubs with massive dance floors had already created a closed circuit of guest DJs. who traveled all over the country, and therefore the number of resident DJs was reduced.

At the end of the 90s, the figure of the resident DJ re-emerged, and has remained that way to this day. However, the current role of the resident varies slightly from the traditional role, as a new concept emerged: the "guest resident", meaning several "guest" residents who take turns regularly at a club for a while. One example was Paul Oakenfold, who got a temporary contract and moved to Liverpool for a few months in 1997 to play on Saturdays at Cream.

== Description ==
A resident DJ, also known as a local DJ, is a DJ who is an employee of a club, unlike a guest artist, who works as freelancer and therefore plays at several clubs. Obtaining a residency implies being part of the salaried staff of a company. Unlike a guest, the resident almost inevitably has to conform to certain musical styles dictated by the hiring company. Instead, the resident's sponsorship rests with the club itself, which will probably means greater investment in marketing than if it worked independently.

The residency is considered the best way of pragmatic learning for a novice DJ: everything they learned at home is now put into practice with an audience in front of them, forcing them to engage in a "conversation" with the audience.

Generally, a resident DJ tends to obtain less fame and income than a guest, although there are notable exceptions to this; examples of successful residents are Sandrien from Trouw (Amsterdam), or Ben Klock and Marcel Dettmann from Berghain (Berlin).

By blurring the line that separates residence from invitation, greater work flexibility is allowed for both DJs and clubs. This is how it has been maintained throughout the 21st century.

== Roles ==
The roles of a resident DJ include the following:

- Serve as support for guest DJs, on many occasions adapting to their musical style.
- "Warm up" the dance floor, as being the "opening act", to prepare the public for the next set.
- Availability for the club, this implies having an irregular, flexible schedule, as some weekends the resident DJ will have to play at the beginning of the night, others at rush hour and others at closing.
- Be responsible for the "musical identity" of the club; just as the graphic designer will be in charge of the visual communication of the company, the resident DJ(s) are usually responsible for the musical line of the club, and in part, therefore, for the image or message that is projected.

According to reporter A. Arango of Vice magazine:

Residences not only benefit DJs, but help clubs to forge their sound and give them an identity. That's why when we listen to "Resident of Amnesia Ibiza" or "Resident of Concrete Paris" completely different sounds come to mind. Some residences become so legendary that they end up defining the future of the clubs. For example, it is impossible to talk about Paradise Garage without mentioning the role that Larry Levan played, or to talk about Fabric without mentioning the curatorial work of Craig Richards.

— Alejandro Arango, Vice (2017)

In a broader sense, local DJs are also somewhat responsible for the local music scene in their city, region or country. A more local approach to electronic music leads to the creation of new sounds and trends. M. Barnes describes it for DJ Broadcast:

With a greater focus on touring, there is less chance for local influences to permeate the global electronic music culture. It seems that we are moving towards a homogenized and generic "sound" that avoids any cultural influences from specific localities. As a pillar of a club, the DJ can help cultivate local sounds, from subtle nuances of style to complete reinvention of genres such as Tuki music of Venezuela. Developed by local DJs and producers, who fused hard house and techno with local influences, it emerged as its own subgenre in the early 2000s.

— Marcus Barnes, DJ Broadcast (2013)
