= Pop2K =

- Broadcast area: United States; Canada
- Frequencies: Sirius XM Radio 10; Dish Network 6010; 099-10 (for Hopper users)
- Branding: Pop2K

Programming
- Format: 2000s hits

Ownership
- Owner: Sirius XM Radio
- Sister stations: Flex2K & The Flow (which are 2 new radio stations that play 2000s hits. Flex2K plays Hip-Hop Hits and The Flow plays R&B Hits)

History
- First air date: 2006-04-17 (as XM Hitlist); 2008-11-12 (as Pop2K)
- Former names: XM Hitlist
- Former frequencies: XM 30

Technical information
- Class: Satellite Radio Station

Links
- Website: SiriusXM: Pop2K

Pop2K (formerly XM Hitlist) is a commercial-free all-2000s radio station that is broadcast on Sirius XM Radio. It is located on channel 10 to just listen (previously 30), and Dish Network 6010 and 099-10 to watch and listen. It plays a range of top 40, top 30, top 8 and top 20 hits from 2000 to 2009. Originally, some music would come from the late 1990s. In 2009, the channel would play music from 1996, 1997 1998, 1999, 2000, 2001, 2002, 2003, 2004, 2005, 2006, 2007, 2008 and 2009 and 1999 titles continue on the playlist. The channel is also used for XM's annual pop music chronology, IT. Starting in 2009-2010, the station started to play more deeper cuts and not the popular hits from the decade, to give it a more or less nostalgic flavor that the decades stations have. By 2010, no new 2010s music has been played unless it is left over from 2009, for example, "Tik Tok" by Kesha was a number-one song in 2010 but was released in 2009, making it a 2000s-only station. By December 18, 2009, Mediabase ceased reporting the channel's playlist.

The station gets its name from Y2K, the nickname for the year 2000.

== History ==
XM Hitlist was originally created as a commercial-free alternative to Clear Channel's CHR hits station on XM, KISS, which began airing commercials in May 2006. When Clear Channel began airing commercials on KISS, DirecTV and AOL Radio dropped the KISS stream from their services, and added the XM Hitlist stream instead. XM Radio Canada dropped KISS entirely with no replacement. On April 1, 2007, XM Canada added Hitlist to its channel line-up.

In 2008, the channel was rebranded as Pop2K as part of SiriusXM's channel merger. In 2009, Pop2K was dropped from Sirius Satellite Radio for four years as the channel reverted to an XM-exclusive channel, leaving Sirius with only one contemporary hit radio channel. The Pop2K channel was replaced on the Sirius platform by BackSpin (which, ironically, is also part of XM's lineup).

On May 9, 2013, Pop2K was added back to the Sirius Satellite Radio lineup.

On August 21, 2015, Pop2K was added to Dish Network 6010, to go with Sirius XM Radio 10 after seven years.

• Current on-air DJs

Pop2K has 3 on-air DJs.

Kim Ashley: Mon-Fri 6am-12pm

Rich Davis: Mon-Fri 12pm-6pm.

Lamar Dawnson: Mon-Fri 6pm-12am.

The Pop2Kountdown

Every Saturday morning Rich Davis plays the top biggest 20 Billboard songs of each year from the 2000s to determine who has the #1 spot from that year, and Lamar Dawson plays the top 13 buildboard hits

My Top 8

My Top 8 is a segment in which listeners select their favorite songs from the 2000s each weeknight.

== DirecTV Channel Lineup ==
During its suspension on Sirius, it was also the only XM-exclusive channel owned by Sirius XM Radio featured on DirecTV channel 817. On March 27, 2009, Pop2K was added to the Sirius line-up as an internet-only channel.

On February 9, 2010, all of the SiriusXM programming on DirecTV was dropped in favor of Sonic Tap by DMX.

== Former DJs ==
For a period of about six months between April and November 2006, Priestly and Michelle Cartier were moved from Top 20 on 20 to XM Hitlist, retaining their time slots. In November, they were moved back to Top 20 on 20 as part of the channel's relaunch. Priestly and Cartier were subsequently replaced by other DJs on XM Hitlist.

== Internet Player ==
The internet player can be based to play either pop or rock, despite the name implying an all-pop format.

== Core artists ==
- P!nk
- Kelly Clarkson
- Eminem
- Britney Spears
- Linkin Park
- Nelly
- Usher
- Christina Aguilera
- Maroon 5
- Fall Out Boy
- Rihanna
- Justin Timberlake
- Nickelback
- Will Smith
- Matchbox Twenty
- Jennifer Lopez
- Beyonce
- Jay-Z
- Chris Brown
- T.I.
- Ja Rule
- Ludacris
- Mary J. Blige
- The Pussycat Dolls
- Destiny's Child
- Shakira
- Ashanti
- Alicia Keys
- 50 Cent
