= Jonathan Schwartz (radio personality) =

American radio personality (born 1938)

Jonathan Schwartz (born June 28, 1938) is an American radio personality, known for his devotion to traditional pop standards. From the 1960s on, he has been a presence on radio stations in the New York radio market, until he was fired in December 2017. He then hosted an internet radio show on The Jonathan Station from 2018 until he retired in March 2021. Additionally, Schwartz sometimes performs as a singer and has recorded numerous selections from the collection of popular music from the 1920s, '30s, '40s, and '50s known as the Great American Songbook. Schwartz has also written novels, short stories, and a memoir, All In Good Time (2004).

== Early life ==
Schwartz was born in New York City, the son of composer Arthur Schwartz (1900–1984) and 1930s Broadway ingénue Kay Carrington. Though his memoirs describe an unhappy childhood, Schwartz grew up animated by a passionate interest in musical arts. His father was a composer of Broadway and film scores ("Dancing in the Dark", "That's Entertainment!" and "By Myself" are among his works), and from an early age Schwartz developed his interest through this family perspective. Jonathan's half-brother Paul Schwartz (born 1956) is a composer, conductor, pianist, and producer.

== Radio career ==
Schwartz worked at New York's WNEW-FM from 1967 to 1976, followed by stints at WNEW, WQEW and, between 1999 and 2017, WNYC-FM. Schwartz also served as programming director for XM Satellite Radio Frank's Place, named in honor of Frank Sinatra. Following XM's merger with Sirius, the name was changed to High Standards channel from 2001 to 2008, and appeared on Sirius XM's Siriusly Sinatra and '40s on 4 channels from 2008 to 2013.

Schwartz is best known for The Jonathan Schwartz Show, which aired Saturday evenings and Sunday afternoons on WNYC-FM, and was about half talk and half an eclectic mix of music.

In his talk during the shows, Schwartz would hold extended monologues concerning famous pop songwriters and singers, and jazz artists. His music selections incorporated pop jazz, pop standards, big band and Broadway show tunes, augmented by music of nearly any popular style that has influenced twentieth century American tastes. His playlists reflected the "Great American Songbook" or, as Schwartz described it, "America's classical music". Traditionally, Schwartz opened each broadcast with the same secret snippet of music which he had always refused to identify until 2014, at a show at the Brooklyn Academy of Music: slightly more than a minute of "a lilting woman's voice, wordless and yet evocative, over an acoustic guitar." The voice is that of Schwartz's friend since childhood, Carly Simon; listeners had speculated that the music may have been composed by his father, but it was a joint work of his and Carly Simon's. Similarly, he closed most shows with a song from the late cabaret singer Nancy LaMott, followed by a segment from another instrumental recording by Schwartz's idol, the late Nelson Riddle, and his orchestra.

Schwartz is known for his lengthy and detailed on-air stories about his interactions with famous people, most often Frank Sinatra. He also claims an encyclopedic knowledge of Sinatra, and claims that Sinatra himself was amazed by Schwartz's knowledge of every song he had ever recorded. He champions young artists who carry on the traditions of the American Songbook, as well as reveling in the songwriters and performers of the Sinatra era. In 1986 Schwartz won a Grammy Award for Best Album Notes for The Voice - The Columbia Years 1943-1952.

In 2013 WNYC launched The Jonathan Channel, a 24/7 streaming Internet radio station programmed by Schwartz and dedicated to American songs selected by him. The channel also featured live programming hosted by Schwartz, along with simulcasts and replays of his Saturday and Sunday WNYC shows.

On December 6, 2017, as the MeToo movement gained momentum, WNYC announced that Schwartz and longtime WNYC host Leonard Lopate were being put on leave "pending investigations into allegations of inappropriate conduct." On December 21, 2017, WNYC fired both Schwartz and Lopate, stating that "investigations found that each individual had violated [WNYC's] standards for providing an inclusive, appropriate, and respectful work environment". The station's Jonathan Channel stream was concurrently renamed American Standards, and as of 2020 is known as New Standards.

On June 17, 2018, Schwartz began broadcasting on an internet radio station, The Jonathan Station, that was created for him a few months before by Bob Perry of Big Sticks Broadcasting. It is a live streaming station that presents the American Songbook twenty four hours a day with live programs with Jonathan Schwartz on Saturdays and Sundays. The long tradition of presenting a Christmas Show, something that Schwartz started in 1971 while at WNEW, continues at the new station.

In February 2021, Schwartz announced that he was retiring from radio. His final show aired in early March and continues to be repeated on his channel.

== Other works ==
In addition to his radio work, Schwartz has performed in New York City cabaret, recorded three albums as a singer, and authored five books:

- Almost Home (13 short stories), 1970 Doubleday
- Distant Stations (a novel), 1979 Doubleday
- The Man Who Knew Cary Grant (a novel), 1988 Random House;
- A Day of Light and Shadows (about one baseball game), 2000 Akadine Press
- All in Good Time (a memoir), 2004 Random House

He does most of his writing in Palm Springs, California.

== Personal life ==
Schwartz was married to the author Sara Davidson in the late 1960s. In 1979, he married the journalist and Vanity Fair correspondent Marie Brenner. Their daughter Casey Schwartz is an author and journalist. Schwartz later married Elinor Renfield, with whom he has a son.

In March 2010, Schwartz married actress Zohra Lampert in New York City. At the wedding, his long-time friend Tony Bennett sang "I See Your Face Before Me", a 1937 composition by Schwartz's father and Howard Dietz.

In January 2025 his daughter Casey talked on a podcast about his health problems, which resemble advanced dementia.
