= SiriusXM Hits 1 =

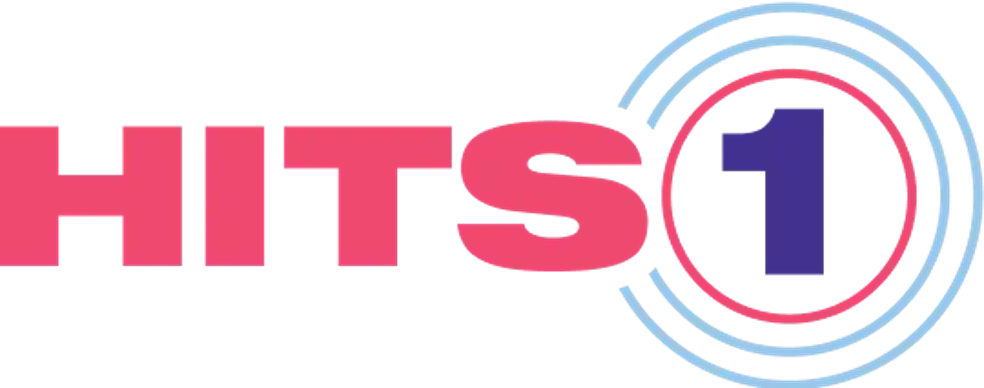
- Broadcast area: United States; Canada
- Frequencies: Sirius XM Radio 2 Dish Network 6002

Programming
- Format: Top 40 (CHR)

Ownership
- Owner: SiriusXM Radio

History
- First air date: November 12, 2008 (as Hits 1)

Technical information
- Class: Satellite Radio Station

Links
- Website: SiriusXM Hits 1

SiriusXM Hits 1 (or just "Hits 1") is a contemporary hit radio station on SiriusXM Radio channel 2 and Dish Network channels 6002 and 099-02 (099-02 is only for Hopper users). Like most SiriusXM stations, it plays no commercials. The channel was formerly known as US-1 until 2004. The name is a take-off of VH1, whose name was originally an abbreviation of "Video Hits 1". Vh1 Satellite Radio once existed on XM but the channel was discontinued prior to the merger.

Following the merger, SiriusXM Hits 1 programming simulcasted on XM's Top 20 On 20 from 9 p.m. to noon Eastern for 2 years in the mid to late 2000s, where it was announced as SiriusXM Hits 1 On 20 on 20.

On May 4, 2011, at 12:01 am EST, Hits 1 moved to channel 2 for Sirius radios, XM radios, and on SiriusXM Online. On Dish Network, SiriusXM Hits 1 is carried on channels 6002 and 099-02.

== The Weekend Countdown ==
Every week, Hits 1 counts down their top 30 songs ranked by airplay. Songs can stay on the Countdown anywhere from one week to over twenty weeks. Prior to May 2020, The Weekend Countdown consisted of 45 songs.

== Year End Countdown ==
Hits 1 usually does their year end countdown annually, which are ranked by spins throughout the calendar year. The year end countdowns almost always match the length of the Weekend Countdown, ranking the top 45 songs up until 2019 and the top 30 songs since 2020. However, there have been two exceptions to this rule. Hits 1 did not even make a year end countdown in 2011, and for the 2012 year end countdown, they only ranked the 14 songs that reached #1 on the Weekend Countdown that year.

=== List of Year End Countdowns ===
Year	Top Song	Artist	Number of Entries
2010	Break Your Heart	Taio Cruz, Ludacris	Top 45
2012	What Makes You Beautiful	One Direction	Top 14
2013	My Songs Know What You Did in the Dark (Light Em Up)	Fall Out Boy	Top 45
2014	Counting Stars	OneRepublic	Top 45
2015	Shut Up and Dance	Walk The Moon	Top 45
2016	Stressed Out	Twenty One Pilots	Top 45
2017	Shape of You	Ed Sheeran	Top 45
2018	The Middle	Zedd, Maren Morris, Grey	Top 45
2019	Who Do You Love	The Chainsmokers, 5 Seconds of Summer	Top 45
2020	Adore You	Harry Styles	Top 30
2021	Therefore I Am	Billie Eilish	Top 30
2022	As It Was	Harry Styles	Top 30
2023	Flowers	Miley Cyrus	Top 30
2024	Espresso	Sabrina Carpenter	Top 30
2025	APT.	Rosé, Bruno Mars	Top 30

== HitBound ==
HitBound logo (May 2014)

HitBound is a weekly program airing on Saturday at 9 am and Sunday at noon highlighting new music on SiriusXM Hits 1. HitBound is primarily hosted by Mikey Piff but will occasionally feature guest hosts (usually artists with music featured on the show).

Songs that debut on SiriusXM Hits 1 primarily start airing on HitBound before "graduating" to The Weekend Countdown.

On occasion, popular celebrities or artists will guest host The Weekend Countdown and HitBound (promoted as a "Weekend Takeover"). Notable HitBound guest hosts include Timeflies, Jason Derulo and Britney Spears (as a "Weekend Takeover").

=== List of 2014 HitBound guest hosts ===
Date	Guest Host	Notes
January 11, 2014	AJR	
January 18, 2014	Karmin	
February 1, 2014	Bastille	
February 8, 2014	Hot Chelle Rae	Weekend Takeover
February 15, 2014	Jason Derulo	
March 8, 2014	Oh Honey	HitBound "Artist To Follow"
March 15, 2014	Cher Lloyd	Weekend Takeover
April 19, 2014	Magic!	
April 26, 2014	Naughty Boy	
May 3, 2014	Timeflies	
May 31, 2014	Halsey	HitBound "Artist To Follow"
June 14, 2014	Sam Smith	
July 19, 2014	5 Seconds Of Summer	Weekend Takeover
August 16, 2014	The Madden Brothers	
August 19, 2014	The Vamps	Weekend Takeover
August 30, 2014	Ariana Grande	Weekend Takeover
September 12, 2014	Nick Jonas	
September 20, 2014	Mary Lambert	
September 27, 2014	Betty Who	
October 4, 2014	R5	
October 25, 2014	Eden XO	
November 1, 2014	Taylor Swift	"Hall-o-weekend"
November 6, 2014	AJR	
November 15, 2014	Tove Lo	
November 22, 2014	The Vamps	

=== List of 2013 HitBound guest hosts ===
Date	Guest Host
January 19, 2013	Emeli Sande
January 26, 2013	Olly Murs
February 9, 2013	Fall Out Boy
February 16, 2013	The Ready Set
March 8, 2013	Jake Miller
March 22, 2013	MKTO
March 30, 2013	Icona Pop
April 13, 2013	Fall Out Boy Weekend Takeover
May 4, 2013	Robin Thicke
May 11, 2013	Jennifer Lopez Weekend Takeover
May 18, 2013	Kelsi Luck
May 25, 2013	Jason Derulo
June 8, 2013	Emblem3 Weekend Takeover
June 29, 2013	Miley Cyrus Weekend Takeover
July 6, 2013	Selena Gomez Weekend Takeover
July 20, 2013	Labrinth
August 3, 2013	Midnight Red
August 17, 2013	Bonnie McKee
August 24, 2013	The Wanted Hitbound Artist To Follow
August 31, 2013	Hayley Williams Weekend Takeover
September 7, 2013	Ariana Grande
October 5, 2013	Jesse McCartney
October 17, 2013	MKTO
November 28, 2013	Britney Spears Weekend Takeover
December 14, 2013	Cash Cash

== Core artists ==
- Twenty One Pilots
- Ed Sheeran
- Justin Timberlake
- Lady Gaga
- Katy Perry
- Taylor Swift
- Maroon 5
- Bruno Mars
- P!nk
- Harry Styles
- Dua Lipa
- Lizzo
- Jonas Brothers
- The Weeknd
- Beyonce
- Lil Nas X
- Imagine Dragons
- Jack Harlow
- Justin Bieber
- Ariana Grande
- Doja Cat
- Sam Smith
- Miley Cyrus
- Sabrina Carpenter
- SZA
- Post Malone
- Olivia Rodrigo
- Benson Boone
- OneRepublic
- Fall Out Boy
- Sombr
- Chappell Roan
- All Time Low
- Demi Lovato
- Blackbear
- Halsey
- Panic! At The Disco
- Machine Gun Kelly

== See also ==
- List of Sirius Satellite Radio stations
