= '70s on 7 =

Sirius XM satellite radio channel

- Broadcast area: United States; Canada
- Frequencies: Sirius XM Radio 7 Dish Network 6007, 099-07

Programming
- Format: 1970s' Music

Ownership
- Owner: Sirius XM Radio

History
- First air date: September 25, 2001 (as Totally '70s)
- Former names: Totally 70's The 70's

Technical information
- Class: Satellite Radio Station

Links
- Website: SiriusXM: '70s on 7

'70s on 7 (or just The '70s) is a commercial-free, satellite radio channel on Sirius XM Radio channel 7 and Dish Network channel 6007 (channel 099-07 on Dish's Hopper DVR units). It plays pop, rock, soul, and disco music from the 1970s, mostly hits. Prior to XM's merger with Sirius, Arbitron reported that '70s on 7 was the fourth most listened to channel, with a cume of 667,400 listeners per week. As part of the Sirius/XM merger on November 12, 2008, The '70s was merged with Sirius' Totally '70s and took its current name.

== Features and content ==
Much like the other decades channels, '70s on 7 attempts to recreate the feel of 1970s radio. It uses similar DJ techniques, jingles, 1970s slang, and news updates. Kid Kelly, formerly of WHTZ New York, programs the channel with Human Numan, a long-time contemporary hit radio personality. Creative imaging is produced by producer Mitch Todd who oversees all producers and production on the music channels and the marketing division. Due to being commercial-free, it does not recreate any sponsor spots. The channel was also used for XM's annual pop music chronology, IT.

The original XM "70s on 7" channel made a strong effort to reproduce the smooth, velvety 1970s FM sound rather than the chatty "morning drive" sound that Sirius favored. After the XM-Sirius merger the "morning drive" sound became the "official" sound of the 1970s channel. The channel features the unique "Jukebox of Dynamite" (formerly the "Jukebox of Cheese"), when an alleged listener selects a "cheesy" song for the segment such as "Oh, Babe, What Would You Say?", "Seasons in the Sun", "Theme from Billy Jack", "Run Joey Run" or "Billy Don't Be A Hero".

70s on 7 also uses bumpers that parody TV shows and commercial jingles from the 70s, and also has its own parodies of movie scenes, known as "director's cuts".

== Logo ==
The station's logo currently has a flower as the zero. Prior to 2015, the station's logo featured a disco ball as the zero. The internet version can be biased to play only disco and soul.

== See also ==
- 1970s nostalgia
