= J. J. Jackson (media personality) =

Media personality and MTV VJ

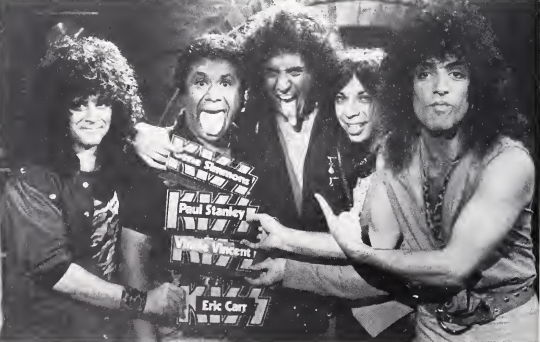
- Jackson (second from left) with Kiss in 1983
- Born: John Julian Jackson III; 1941 or 1942; Atlanta, Georgia, USA
- Died: March 17, 2004 (aged 62); Los Angeles, California, US
- Other name: Triple J
- Occupations: Radio and television personality

John Julian "J. J." Jackson III was an American radio and television personality. He was one of MTV's five original VJs (along with Nina Blackwood, Mark Goodman, Alan Hunter, and Martha Quinn). In his appearances on MTV, Jackson often went by, and introduced himself as, "Triple J."

== Career ==
Jackson first gained prominence while working at WBCN in Boston in the late 1960s, then at KLOS in Los Angeles for ten years. Jackson was one of the first DJs to introduce Americans to The Who and Led Zeppelin. In 1976, he was featured in a voice-only performance as a DJ of the fictional KGYS radio in the movie Car Wash. He was a music reporter for KABC-TV when he was tapped as one of MTV's original "fab five."

As a VJ, Jackson hosted the long-awaited and much anticipated "unmasking" of Kiss. He was one of the few African Americans to DJ an "album rock" radio station. MTV staff members described him as social, popular with women, and a frequent partier.

After five years at MTV, Jackson returned to Los Angeles radio, JJ's first gig after MTV was 106 KWST then at KROQ-FM in 1987, then as program director of modern rock/alternative station KEDG ("The Edge") until May 1989. He later returned to KLOS, and hosted the afternoon shift at smooth jazz station KTWV ("The Wave") for one year. He also hosted Westwood One Radio Network's nationally syndicated radio show The Beatle Years from 1995 until his death.

== Death ==
On March 17, 2004, Jackson suffered a heart attack and died while driving home after dining with a friend in Los Angeles. He was 62 years old. Jackson had a daughter and three grandchildren.
