= Cume =

Measure of the total number of unique consumers over a specified period

In the practice of measuring the size of US commercial broadcasting and newspaper audiences, cume, short for "cumulative audience", is a measure of the total number of unique consumers over a specified period.

The technical definition of cume is restricted by Arbitron, which is now referred to as Nielsen Audio, as requiring a listener to tune in for at least five minutes.
