= Pat St. John =

American radio personality and voice-over artist

- Born: February 12, 1951 (age 75); Detroit, Michigan, U.S.
- Occupations: Radio personality, voice-over artist
- Years active: 1969–present
- Employer: Sirius XM Radio
- Known for: Longtime New York City radio personality (WPLJ, WNEW-FM, WCBS-FM, WAXQ), host on Sirius XM Radio
- Notable work: Host of '60s Gold; announcer for Dick Clark's New Year's Rockin' Eve (2000–2010)
- Awards: Inducted into the Radio Hall of Fame (2023)

Pat St. John (born February 12, 1951) is an American radio personality and voice-over artist. He began his radio career on Windsor, Ontario's CKLW (800 AM) in 1969 and 1970, followed by WKNR (1310 AM) in late 1970 to early 1972, followed by WRIF FM (101.1) to April 1973. St. John is best known for the 42 years he spent in the New York City radio market working for WPLJ, WNEW-FM, WAXQ and WCBS FM. He can now be heard on Sirius XM Radio '60s Gold Weekdays 3PM to 7 PM ET and Saturdays from 8-11PM ET. St. John has done television voiceover work, including announcing for Dick Clark's New Year's Rockin' Eve from 2000 to 2010.

St. John is known for his conversational on-air style interspersed with bits of music trivia, along with "Collectible Cuts" from his extensive record library. St. John has interviewed many musicians. In 2023, St. John was inducted into the national Radio Hall of Fame. In 2025, the CD Johnnie Johnson: I'm Just Johnnie was released, which includes a second CD of interviews that St. John did with Johnnie Johnson (recorded circa 2003).

== Early years in Detroit ==
St. John was born in Detroit and was raised on the music of Motown. In early 1969, at the age of 18, he landed his first gig as a radio personality on Windsor's CKLW, where he also worked for CKLW's 20/20 news doing newscasts one day a week, and part-time booth announcing on CKLW-TV Channel 9. In late 1970 he moved across the border to WKNR and was then hired in early 1972 at the ABC-owned album-oriented rock (AOR) station WRIF until 1973.

== WPLJ and WNEW years ==
In April 1973, St. John began an almost 15-year stint at New York's WPLJ. For most of his years at WPLJ he was rated by Arbitron as the most-listened-to afternoon radio personality in America (source: ARB's "Drive-Time Dominaters"). He survived the station's transition from AOR to top 40 in 1983, and during that era, continued his Arbitron ratings success with that same ranking.

He left WPLJ in 1987, and returned to his rock roots on WNEW-FM, which had been WPLJ's rival during its AOR years. He became the station's program director in the early 1990s while continuing his mid-day show until being asked to do morning-drive (which he did from 1994 through 1996) and then moved to afternoons where then followed Scott Muni who moved to mid-days). St. John remained with the station until it switched to a hot talk format in 1998.

== Post WNEW career ==
After the demise of WNEW's rock format, St. John was one of the first programmers hired by CD Radio in October 1998 as the director of classic rock programming). CD Radio would later change its name to Sirius Satellite Radio, and then after acquiring XM Satellite Radio become known as SiriusXM, where he remains today as one of their most popular personalities. He also joined WCBS-FM in 2002, followed by moving to WAXQ in 2004 where he stayed until late 2006. In July 2007, he returned to the re-incarnated WCBS-FM following the station's short-lived detour to "Jack FM". In February 2008, St. John actually replaced Howard Cogan as the pre-recorded voice of the Jack character on WCBS-FM-HD2 and its web stream at ilikejack.com until it became ToNY (meaning "To New York" but pronounced "Tony" until later simulcasting WCBS News Radio 880 in December 2012. For the first decade of the new century he was the announcer for Dick Clark's New Year's Rockin' Eve. He continues to do voiceover work for radio and TV commercials as well as station imaging for radio and television as well as narration.

April 9, 2013 marked St. John's 40th anniversary on New York radio, making him New York's longest-running air personality.

In March 2015, St. John announced that he was leaving WCBS-FM and that he and his wife were moving to California to be closer to their grandson. He aired his final show on April 12, 2015.

As of October 2023, he had already spent 25+ years working in satellite radio, starting with the CD Radio network in October 1998; that company later evolved into SiriusXM after a merger with former rival XM. During those years, he has been heard on such channels as "60s Vibrations", "The Vault", Deep Tracks, and "Sirius Blues" (where he was also the channel's format manager and program director). In 2023, he can be heard regularly on '60s Gold (formerly '60s on 6) classic rock.

He has also been the voice of Metropolitan Opera Radio on the service, further showing his versatility. St. John was also chosen to announce system-wide that Howard Stern would be joining Sirius.

St. John's association with classic rock has continued throughout the years as he has been asked for his input on several classic rock projects. He was thanked in the liner notes of albums by Marvin Gaye and Jr. Walker and The All-Stars, as well as the box-sets of Stevie Wonder and The Temptations. St. John is the narrator (along with Smokey Robinson and Lionel Richie) of the two-CD set "The classic rock Story Volume 1: The 1960s". He can also be heard on classic rock's web site narrating several classic rock stories.

St. John was recognized by Rock and Roll Hall of Fame in Cleveland by being added to their permanent display of America's Greatest Classic Rock Air Personalities.

=== Personal life ===
St. John and his wife live in San Diego where he broadcasts his '60s Gold and rock'n roll shows from a customized studio in a barn on their property.
