= '40s Junction =

Sirius XM satellite radio channel

- Broadcast area: United States; Canada
- Frequencies: Sirius XM Radio 71; Dish Network 6071

Programming
- Format: 1940-1949 and (occasionally) 1950–1953 Music

Ownership
- Owner: Sirius XM Radio

History
- First air date: September 25, 2001
- Former names: '40s on 4 '40s
- Former frequencies: Sirius XM Radio 4 (2001-2015); Sirius XM Radio 73 (2015-2021)

Technical information
- Class: Satellite radio station

Links
- Website: www.siriusxm.com/channels/40s-junction

'40^{s} Junction is a commercial-free music channel on the Sirius XM Radio platform, broadcasting on channel 71; as well as Dish Network channel 6071. The channel mainly airs big band, swing, and hit parade music from 1940 to 1949, with occasional songs from the early-1950s. Until May 7, 2015, the station was known as '40^{s} on 4, with programming being broadcast on channel 4, as part of the "Decades" line-up of stations. It was later rechanneled to be nearer to stations featuring similar genres of music, such as jazz and standards. During its first four months on Ch. 71, the station was known simply as '40^{s}. The station was rebranded as 40^{s} Junction on August 13, 2015.

The 40^{s} Junction name, and the station's longtime nickname, "The Savoy Express", refer to the passenger train−travel common in the 1940s. The name also lends reference to the popular dance hall in Harlem during 1940s called The Savoy Ballroom, where the Lindy Hop and "Jitterbug" dancing was born. The original "Station Master" (Program Director) for the channel was Marlin Taylor, with Bob Moke serving as music director. Both have since departed, and the channel is currently programmed by Human Numan. The "voice" of the channel is Lou Brutus, who models his announcing style after that of Bing Crosby staff announcer, Ken Carpenter. Brutus worked as Sr. Director of Music Programming, overseeing the content for a long and diverse lineup of channels. He was subsequently laid off from SiriusXM amongst a company wide reduction of staff in March of 2023. In keeping with the railroad theme, the station's logo now features a train itself, based on the 1940s Reading Railroad's sleek stainless steel streamliner called the "Crusader", which operated between Philadelphia and Jersey City, NJ. Trains were the primary mode of distance transportation in the '40s. Airline travel wasn't fully developed and cost prohibitive to the masses.

== History ==
XM once described the channel as follows:

Climb aboard the Savoy Express for a trip to yesterday and the sound of swing. Revel in the heyday of the big bands and the hits of the '40s. All aboard, Track 4!

The current channel description reads:

Hep Cats and Swingeroos, here comes the Savoy Express. Crooners serenade, and harmony groups join forces with orchestras to play everything in 'the book'. From Benny Goodman and Bing Crosby, to Doris Day and Count Basie, hear the hits from the '40s and beyond.

Similar to other XM "Decades" stations, prior to the 2008 merger with Sirius, the '40^{s} channel was initially programmed to recreate the feeling of the '40s era. This was accomplished by broadcasting big band/swing music; recreated newscasts in which fictional reporter "Ed Baxter", voiced by Bill Schmalfeldt, would report on the day's top stories in a year from 1936 to 1949, as if they were current now; countdowns of the top 3 hit songs from the current week in a year from 1936 to 1949; World War II–era, patriotic songs; Spike Jones's joke novelty recordings; along with such features as the Record Museum, which played tracks from any year between 1920 and 1935. During Academy Award season, director Bob Moke would regularly introduce and play all of the Academy Award nominated songs for a particular year between 1936 and 1949.

From November 16 through December 25, 2009, '40^{s} on 4 would be preempted for Holiday Traditions, a seasonal program devoted to popular Christmas music from the 1940s to the 1960s. In 2010, the channel was again preempted for Holiday Traditions, this time starting November 15, and extending through January 1, 2011. The following year, Holiday Traditions appeared on its own channel (147), from November 14, 2011 to January 2, 2012.

Previously featured programs included Harmony Square, a 1-hour presentation of barbershop music that aired on Sunday afternoons and evenings; Big Band Jump, a syndicated weekly program, hosted by Don Kennedy, that specialized in Big Band music and the stories behind it; and a weekly program devoted to vintage, Bing Crosby radio shows, such as Philco Radio Time and Kraft Music Hall.

The channel was also used for XM's annual pop-music chronology, IT, from 2002 to 2007. From August 2011 to August 2013, Jonathan Schwartz, formerly of XM's High Standards and Siriusly Sinatra stations, was heard daily on '40^{s} on 4, playing a mixture of classic and contemporary pop standards recordings.

From March 26 to June 25, 2014, '40^{s} on 4 was temporarily replaced by the Billy Joel Channel. This change was ill-received by many of the station's fans; many of whom cancelled their subscriptions or demanded refunds from Sirius XM as a result.

Channel 4 was occupied by Pitbull's Globalization Radio when the '40s channel moved to Channel 71.

While known as "40s", the station logo featured the previous logo, but the on 4 text was removed.

== Internet Player ==
An early version of the SiriusXM app included a feature which allowed tempo to be adjusted to play faster music (i.e. Swing), or slower music (i.e., Traditional Pop), which has been discontinued.

== Core artists ==
- Glenn Miller
- Dorsey Brothers
- Benny Goodman
- Harry James
- Bing Crosby
- Count Basie
- Les Brown
- Artie Shaw
- Duke Ellington
- Andrews Sisters
- Jan Eberle
- Doris Day
- Frank Sinatra
- Louis Armstrong
