= Nina Blackwood =

American disc jockey

- Born: Nina Kinckiner; Springfield, Massachusetts, United States
- Occupations: Disc jockey, music journalist, MTV VJ, actress, model
- Known for: Original MTV video jockey, radio and TV personality

Nina Blackwood is an American disc jockey and music journalist, who was the first of the original five MTV VJs (along with Mark Goodman, J. J. Jackson, Alan Hunter, and Martha Quinn). She has been an actress and model noted for her raspy voice.

== Early life and career ==
Blackwood was born Nina Kinckiner in Springfield, Massachusetts. Her father was in government service, and also taught Sunday school - but he was never a minister, as has sometimes been reported. She grew up on the west side of Cleveland, Ohio, and attended Rocky River High School, graduating in 1970. In high school, she sang and played keyboards in her high school sweetheart's band, and covered the song "Venus."

Before entering broadcasting, Blackwood appeared nude in the August 1978 Playboy pictorial "The Girls in the Office" as a brunette.

She moved to California, and studied acting at the Strasberg Institute. Blackwood has acted in a number of TV show and films, making appearances in the movies Vice Squad (1982), Reckless Kelly (1993), and I Crave Rock & Roll (1996).

== MTV and other television appearances ==
She was chosen for MTV's original video jockey lineup, along with Martha Quinn, Mark Goodman, Alan Hunter, and J. J. Jackson, when the network began airing in 1981. In her application, she drew on her headshot image "to make it look punky." The producers flew her in from Los Angeles to New York to meet the organization's leaders and decide whether she would take the job. At dinner with executive producer Sue Steinberg and creative director Robert Morton, she started choking on a piece of bread. Morton performed the Heimlich maneuver, and the two agreed she owed it to him to take the job.

After leaving MTV in 1986, she hosted her own "Rock Report" for Entertainment Tonight. She also appeared on the TV music show Solid Gold from 1986 to 1988. Blackwood has appeared on A Current Affair, Access Hollywood, VH1, Discovery Channel, National Geographic, and MSNBC.

== Radio career ==
In 1999, Blackwood and long-time manager/producer Danny Sheridan launched a nationally syndicated radio show for United Stations Radio Network titled Nina Blackwood's Absolutely 80's. The two followed up with another nationally syndicated program, the '80s' alternative-themed Nina Blackwood's New Wave Nation. Blackwood formerly hosted a weekday show on Sirius XM Radio The 80s on 8 from 11 to 2 Eastern. On weekends, she continues to co-host the Sirius XM Radio show The Big '80s Top 40 Countdown with other original MTV VJs.

She performed as part of the 2003 road company of The Vagina Monologues.

== In popular culture ==
Blackwood has said that the 1984 John Waite hit single "Missing You" was written about her and that Waite has confirmed it was about her and other women he had dated.

== Personal life ==
Blackwood, who was briefly married to a man named Dennis and has no children, lives on a farm in coastal Maine. A longtime animal lover, her farm acts as an animal sanctuary and is home to numerous dogs, cats, birds, horses, and other creatures.

Blackwood is known for her raspy voice, something she's had since she was a child, and has stated that it's gotten more pronounced as she has aged.
