= Martha Quinn =

American broadcaster, MTV VJ

- Born: May 11, 1959 (age 67); Albany, New York
- Education: New York University (B.A., 1981)
- Occupations: Actress; cable TV personality; radio host
- Spouse: Jordan Tarlow
- Children: 2

Martha Quinn (born May 11, 1959) is an American actress and radio and television personality, best known as one of the original video jockeys on MTV (along with Nina Blackwood, Mark Goodman, Alan Hunter, and J. J. Jackson).

== Early life ==
Quinn was born on May 11, 1959 in Albany, New York, the daughter of Nina Pattison, a retirement counselor, and David Quinn, an attorney. She is the stepdaughter of personal finance columnist Jane Bryant Quinn, and has two older brothers and a younger half-brother.

Prior to joining MTV, Quinn graduated from Ossining High School in 1977, and NYU in 1981. At NYU, she worked at the radio station WNYU playing "urban music."

== MTV ==
On July 13, 1981, Quinn was working at NYU's Weinstein Dormitory where she answered phones and gave students their toilet paper, mail, and lightbulbs. At the end of her day she decided to stop at WNBC (AM), where she had just finished up interning for her senior year. Coincidentally, California record company executive Burt Stein also was visiting WNBC. He asked out loud if anyone knew what Robert Pittman was doing. Pittman had been the program director of WNBC a year or so earlier, but had left to start a new venture: a cable channel called MTV (Music Television). WNBC assistant program director Buzz Brindle overheard Stein’s question and remembered the new venture. He turned to Quinn and suggested that she should try out for a role at the new network as a VJ. Brindle called Pittman and told him about his former intern, Quinn. Pittman told him to get her to the MTV studios immediately, as it was the last day of auditions. Quinn immediately took a cab to Hell's Kitchen for her audition. Brindle's idea had some merit. Quinn had spent much of her time at New York University doing two things: performing in TV commercials (McDonald's, Country Time Lemonade, Clearasil, Campbell's Soup) and working at WNYU-FM, the college radio station.

Quinn entered the studio knowing nothing about MTV or what its producers expected of her. She did a four-minute audition where she talked about Earth, Wind, and Fire; MTV executives immediately surrounded her, asking, "Who are you? Where did you come from? How old are you?" Quinn was stunned, realizing she had just found the perfect job for her talents. Two days later Quinn got the news she was an MTV VJ. The show launched two weeks later.

Quinn joined Mark Goodman, Nina Blackwood, Alan Hunter and J. J. Jackson as MTV's first on-air hosts. Hosting the nation's first music television network provided them with an in-depth and up-close perspective on the most popular rock/pop music and artists of the 1980s.

In 1986, Quinn took part in the then-World Wrestling Federation's (later World Wrestling Entertainment (WWE) Slammy Awards, conducting interviews backstage.

Quinn initially left MTV at the end of her contract in late 1986. However, she was rehired by the network in early 1989 and stayed with the channel until 1992.

=== Popularity ===
Quinn's presence on MTV through 1991 was noted by Rolling Stone magazine readers, who voted her "MTV's Best-Ever VJ," and by Allure Magazine, which referred to the '80s decade as "the Martha Quinn years." In a 2011 review of I Want My MTV by Craig Marks and Rob Tannenbaum, Dwight Garner recalled: "Every sentient straight male in the country developed a schoolboy crush on Martha Quinn, one of the first V.J.'s, fresh out of New York University and so cute she could make your cranium detonate."

Quinn's popularity was sometimes dangerous: security were tasked with protecting her from obsessive fans.

In the early ‘90s, she also hosted the MTV programs Martha's Greatest Hits, MTV Prime with Martha Quinn, and Rockline. Critics have dubbed Quinn's departure from MTV as "the day the video music died." She was also the MTV host at Knebworth 1990.

== Acting roles ==
In 1984, Quinn appeared as herself in an episode of the short-lived sitcom E/R. Quinn played Tympani Charles in Dangerous Curves in 1988. In 1990, she appeared on the short-lived Brady Bunch sequel The Bradys. Quinn played Tracy, who married Bobby Brady (played by Mike Lookinland). She joined Ed McMahon as a co-host for Star Search in 1994. She was a bi-weekly correspondent on The Early Show in 1999. Her film appearances include 1988's Tapeheads; the 1989 film sequel Eddie and the Cruisers II: Eddie Lives!; 1991's Problem Child 2 as Emily, a hot date that received a shocking introduction from John Ritter's problematic son, Junior; and the 1992 low-budget sci-fi comedy film Bad Channels. She also had a recurring role on Full House. Quinn was featured in a series of commercials for Neutrogena in the mid-1990s.

== Career in the 21st century ==
In 2001, Quinn hosted Martha Quinn's Rewind, a daily radio program that was aired on at least five Clear Channel radio stations in the United States.

In 2005, Quinn joined Sirius Satellite Radio network, hosting a one-hour weekly show from her home in Malibu called Martha Quinn Presents: Gods of the Big '80s for the Big '80s channel. After Sirius merged with XM Radio, the channel was rebranded as The 80s on 8, and the show was simply titled Martha Quinn Presents. Quinn joins the other surviving original MTV VJs in hosting programs for The 80s on 8 (10:00 am – 1:00 pm).

On the September 22, 2005 episode of Comedy Central's new series The Showbiz Show with David Spade, Quinn appeared as herself in mock archival footage (dating back to 1983) from her MTV days. In two separate bumper skits, Quinn sarcastically foretold considerably bizarre behavior from stars Michael Jackson and Sting. Subsequent episodes took shots at Whitney Houston and Tommy Lee.

In 2007, Quinn lent her name, face and voice to The '80s Game with Martha Quinn, a PC trivia game developed by Funkitron. The game featured multiple-choice questions about 1980s culture in categories including music, politics, television, sports, movies and celebrities.

Quinn was on SiriusXM until 2016 when she left to host mornings for KOSF in San Francisco, owned by Bob Pittman's iHeartMedia.

In December 2017, Quinn hosted a show for public television called The 80's (My Music).

Since January 2022, Quinn has been hosting The Martha Quinn Show for iHeartMedia, broadcasting across more than 35 iHeartMedia stations, including stations in San Francisco, Seattle, Milwaukee, Salt Lake City, Minneapolis, St. Louis and more.

== Personal life ==
Quinn was vegetarian but has since become vegan.

In the 1980s, she dated Stiv Bators, frontman for punk band Dead Boys.

Toto keyboardist Steve Porcaro had an on-and-off relationship with Martha Quinn while she was working for MTV.

In 1992, she married musician Jordan Tarlow (ex-Fuzztones). They have two children.

In May 2023, Quinn was diagnosed with endometrial cancer.

== In popular culture ==
Quinn is featured prominently in Joe Hill's post-apocalyptic novel The Fireman.

Mojo Nixon and Skid Roper released a humorous song, "Stuffin' Martha's Muffin", about Quinn.
