= Alan Hunter (VJ) =

American television personality (born 1957)

- Born: February 14, 1957 (age 69); Birmingham, Alabama, United States
- Education: Millsaps College
- Occupations: Television and radio personality, video jockey, actor

Alan Caldwell Hunter (born February 14, 1957) is an American radio and television host and personality, producer and actor known for being one of the original five video jockeys (VJs) on MTV from 1981 to 1987 (along with Nina Blackwood, Mark Goodman, J. J. Jackson and Martha Quinn). He is a host on SiriusXM Radio's The 80s on 8 channel and on the Classic Rewind channel.

He co-owns the production company Hunter Films with his brother Hugh. He, Hugh and two other brothers also founded WorkPlay, a multipurpose office, studio and entertainment facility in Birmingham, Alabama. He also hosted the reality show Looking for Stars on the Starz cable television channel as well as the Encore series Big 80s Weekend.

== Biography ==
=== Early life and career ===
Born in Birmingham, Alabama, in 1957, Hunter graduated from Mountain Brook High School in 1975 and earned his BA in psychology in 1979 from Millsaps College in Jackson, Mississippi. During his senior year he got his first television acting job in the ABC Movie of the Week Love's Savage Fury, starring Raymond Burr, Jennifer O'Neill and Michael Paré. After a stint as a professional actor at the Birmingham Children's Theatre, he moved to New York City to attend the Circle in the Square drama school. Afterwards, he held a series of "struggling actor" gigs: bartender, waiter, phone answering service attendant and a handful of Off-off-Broadway roles, finally earning a role in the music video for David Bowie's "Fashion" for which he was paid $50 a day and got to meet Bowie. He also had a bit part (on cutting room floor) in the film musical Annie.

=== MTV ===
In the early summer of 1981, he bumped into MTV exec Bob Pittman at a picnic in Central Park. A month later, Hunter was tapped to join the fledgling MTV, only three weeks prior to its debut.

MTV went on the air August 1, 1981, at midnight in selected markets across America. Hunter was, by technical snafu, the first VJ to appear on screen, with the words "Hi, I'm Alan Hunter. I'll be with you right after Mark. We'll be covering the latest in music news, coast to coast, here on MTV Music Television." And then the other original VJs – Martha Quinn, J. J. Jackson, Nina Blackwood and Mark Goodman – followed.

During his first month with MTV, he kept his regular night job tending bar at New York's Magic Pan Restaurant Cabaret. When a customer recognized him, he determined it was time to become a full-time MTV VJ. Over the next several years Hunter's typical work week included attending concerts and parties until the wee hours and then coming back to the studio at 8:00 am for a full day of taping interviews, promos and features.

Hunter was also heavily involved in the WWF-MTV collaboration, hosting The War to Settle the Score live special on MTV with Gene Okerlund. He also conducted backstage interviews for the show. Hunter also narrated The War Continues, a special produced by MTV that was used to help promote Wrestlemania in March 1985.

As MTV became a dominant outlet for music-related content in the early 1980s, Hunter's celebrity interviews included the first MTV interviews with Madonna, Duran Duran and U2, and also included Ozzy Osbourne, Frank and Moon Unit Zappa, Daryl Hall & John Oates, Loverboy, Kasim Sultan, Crosby Stills & Nash, Kevin Bacon, Robin Williams, Dan Aykroyd, Eurythmics, Kenny Loggins, the Psychedelic Furs, Bob & Doug McKenzie, Lou Reed, Joey Ramone, Andy Warhol, the Cars, the GoGos, the Bangles, Colin Hay and Men at Work, Boy George, Bon Jovi, Bryan Adams, John Mellencamp, Hugh Hefner, Paul Stanley, Gene Simmons, Rod Stewart, Cheap Trick, Billy Idol, Thomas Dolby, Joe Jackson, Cyndi Lauper, Crowded House, Aretha Franklin, Michael McDonald, Rick Springfield, Peter Wolf, Toto, Level 42, Steve Martin, Tom Hanks, Martin Short, Chevy Chase and Pee-wee Herman among others.

In his latter MTV years, Hunter became known for his remotes and road trips in programming, such as MTV Spring Break, MTV's Amuck in America and MTV's Hedonism Weekend with Bon Jovi in Jamaica.

=== Life after MTV ===
In August 1987, after six years with the channel, Hunter departed MTV as a full-time host and relocated from New York to Los Angeles. The same year, he traveled to Russia in September as a freelancer for the channel for a program called Rock in Russia. The documentary explored the world of rock music amid President Gorbachev's perestroika in the Soviet Union while following Billy Joel on his pioneering concert tour to Moscow and Leningrad.

In 1989, he appeared in the film White Hot.

For the years he was in Los Angeles, Hunter starred in numerous Fox pilots, such as HayWire and Pure Insanity, precursors of today's reality programming, as well as commercials for Levi's Dockers and Chevrolet and numerous infomercials for Time-Life.

In the mid-1990s he moved back to his hometown of Birmingham, Alabama, to start a film company called Hunter Films, and, with his brothers, to create the multi-use entertainment facility, WorkPlay, named one of America's 40 Best Venues by Paste magazine.

In 2003, Hunter Films produced the Academy Award-nominated short film Johnny Flynton directed by Lexi Alexander, and executive produced the 2006 Sundance premiered movie Dreamland starring John Corbett, Gina Gershon and Justin Long. 2010 saw the release of the company's executive produced documentary Best Worst Movie and in 2011 the feature film Lifted, which they co-produced and in which Hunter co-stars with Dash Mihok, Nicki Aycox, Ruben Studdard, Trace Adkins and in which Uriah Shelton debuted.

Amid his entrepreneurial endeavors, in 2005 and 2006 Hunter continued his work as a TV host working with Encore and Starz for their first original series Looking for Stars. He was part of a Verizon Wireless national radio campaign for three years and since 2004 has been on SiriusXM radio's '80s on 8 channel, along with two other surviving original MTV VJs. In 2013, he and Blackwood, Goodman and Quinn co-authored the book "VJ: The Unplugged Adventures of MTV's First Wave," published by Atria Books.

Hunter co-founded Birmingham's Sidewalk Film Festival, named by Time magazine as one of the top ten "Film Festivals for the Rest of Us" and serves as its board president. He launched the civic activist group Catalyst4Birmingham and has been an integral part of promoting the film business in the state of Alabama lobbying for legislation to create film incentives as well as the creation of the Birmingham-Jefferson Film Office.

As of 2022, Hunter lives in Webster Groves, Missouri, with his wife, Elizabeth, and their two children. Elizabeth Hunter is an assistant professor of drama in the department of performing arts at Washington University in St. Louis. He previously lived in Chicago for 11 years.
