= Mark Goodman =

American radio and television personality

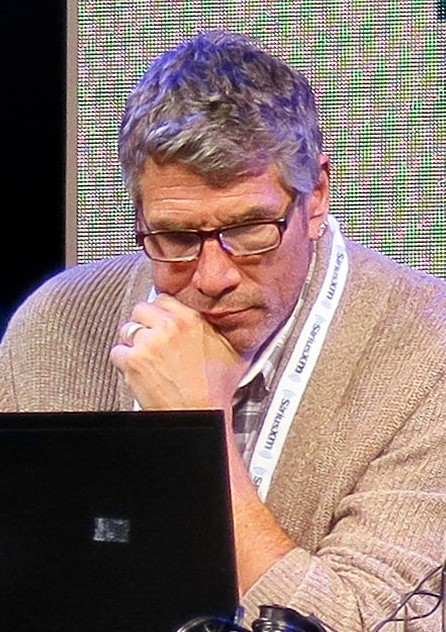
- Goodman in 2016
- Born: October 11, 1952 (age 73); Philadelphia, Pennsylvania, U.S.
- Occupations: Television and radio personality

Mark Goodman (born October 11, 1952) is an American radio host, TV personality and actor. He is best known as one of the original five video jockeys (VJs), along with Nina Blackwood, Alan Hunter, J. J. Jackson, and Martha Quinn, on the music network MTV, from 1981 to 1987.

== Biography ==
On October 11, 1952 (73 years ago), Goodman was born in Philadelphia, Pennsylvania. He is Jewish.

=== Early career ===
==== Radio ====
Goodman started in radio at rock station 93.3 WMMR Philadelphia in 1978 and later became the music director of the station. In 1980, he moved to New York to work at WPLJ, at the time the top rock station in the U.S. He was heard Monday through Saturday from 10 p.m. to 2 a.m.

Goodman was on the air the night in December 1980 that John Lennon was murdered in front of his Manhattan apartment building. Goodman reported extensively on the events as the news began to spread about Lennon's killing.

==== MTV ====
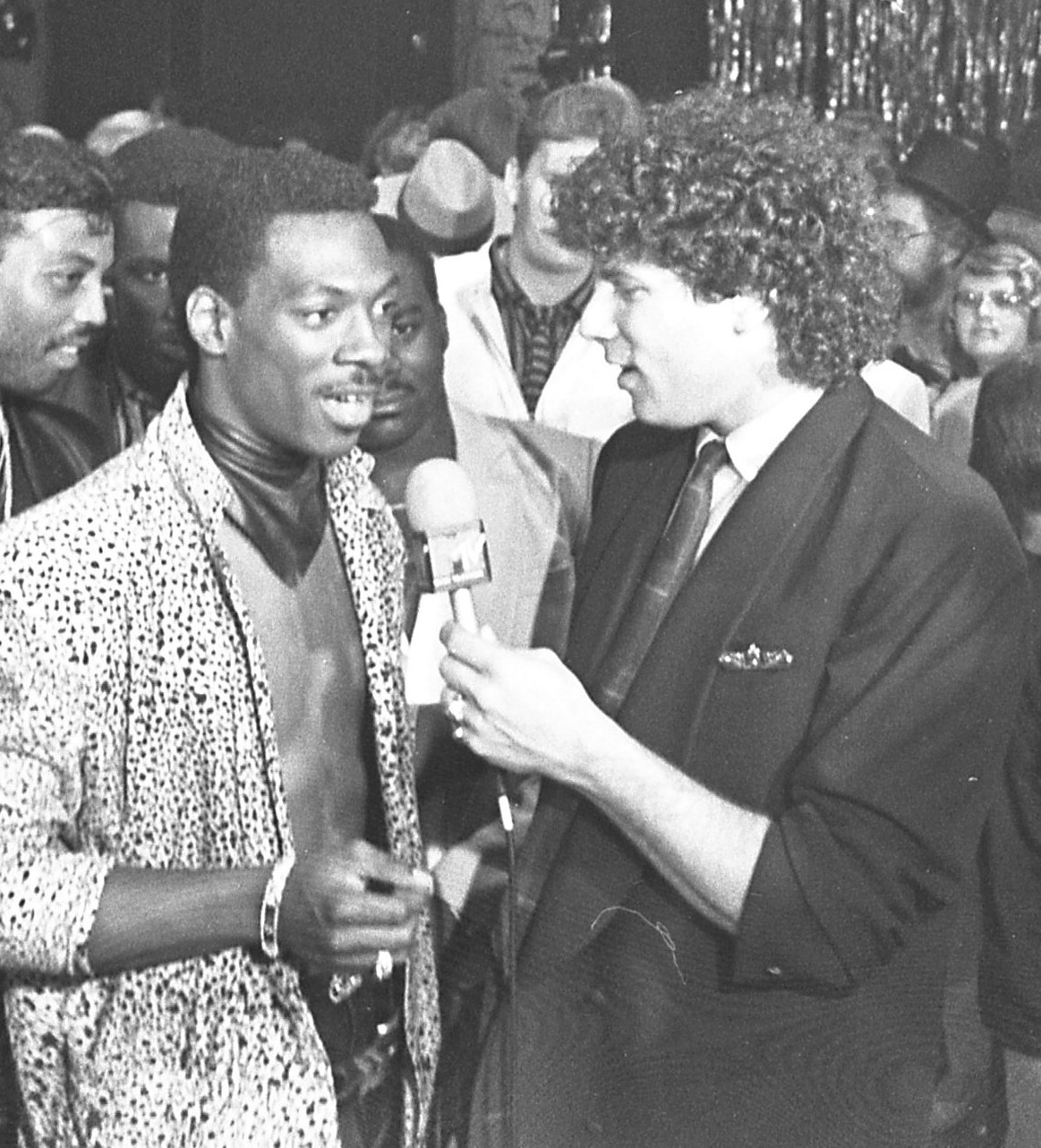
Goodman (age 31) interviewing Eddie Murphy (age 23) at the premiere of Purple Rain (1984).

In 1981, Goodman left WPLJ to join the new and as yet unknown music video channel named MTV. He became one of the five original hosts who introduced music videos and gave short music news reports and artist interviews. These hosts would be called Video Jockeys or VJs by MTV, as opposed to radio hosts who played records and were known as disc jockeys. Goodman interviewed many of the top Rock and Roll artists of the day. He also hosted several special shows for the channel, including The Week in Rock, 120 Minutes, and The Top 20 Video Countdown.

In a 1983 interview with David Bowie, the singer pressed Goodman on MTV for playing few music videos by black artists during that time. MTV actually played few minority acts of any genre in its first few years. Goodman's defense was that the network was thinking in terms of "narrow casting" at suburban youth. The channel was set up like an album rock radio station which concentrated on artists playing rock music, who were largely white.

==== Acting ====
In the late 1980s, Goodman began an acting career that saw him working in film and TV. Goodman appeared in several films, including Man Trouble with Jack Nicholson and Police Academy 6: City Under Siege. On TV, Goodman was seen in such shows as Married... with Children, The Practice, Lois & Clark: The New Adventures of Superman, Vinny And Bobby, and others.

Through the 1990s, Goodman hosted several different TV shows and music specials. In particular, "Fit TV" ran on cable for years after the final episodes were shot. Goodman received no royalties from replays of the show but was pleased to help people learn how to eat right, exercise more, and be open to alternative methods of healing and stress reduction. Goodman also hosted the game show Illinois Instant Riches and its revamp Illinois' Luckiest from 1994 to 2001.

=== Marriage ===
From 1982 to 1987, Goodman was married to New York City rock DJ Carol Miller. They first met when they both worked on radio station 95.5 WPLJ. Goodman has one daughter from a subsequent relationship and is currently married to Jill Goodman.

=== Return to radio ===
In 1989, Goodman returned to radio, working in Los Angeles on KMPC-FM, a rock radio station known as "The Edge." Over the next 10 years, he worked at alternative rock KROQ-FM and KYSR "Star 98.7" in Los Angeles; WKQX "Q101" and WLS-FM in Chicago; and KMXP "Mix 96.9" in Phoenix.

In 1999, Goodman became senior VP of Music Programming for Soundbreak.com, an internet radio station. He developed the format, hired and trained the air staff and developed all the special programming that became available for syndication to other sites, including British Telecom Open World, As Seen In (Aaron Spelling's site), and Newgrounds.

In 2004, after the dot com crash, Goodman was offered a position on Sirius Satellite Radio on its Big '80s channel, along with the three living original MTV VJs, Nina Blackwood, Martha Quinn and Alan Hunter. Since starting there, Goodman has hosted shows on '80s on 8, Classic Rewind (late 1970s to early 1990s rock) and The Spectrum.

Concurrent with his work at SiriusXM, Goodman supervised the music for several pilots for Fox television as well as for the Touchstone/ABC TV show Desperate Housewives.

In the mid-2000s, Goodman was seen on VH-1 and VH-1 Classic doing interviews and hosting special programs while continuing to broadcast seven days per week on Sirius XM.

=== Book ===
In 2013, Goodman, along with Blackwood, Hunter, and Quinn, co-authored the book "VJ: The Unplugged Adventures of MTV's First Wave", published by Atria Books.

=== Sirius XM ===
From 2016 to 2022, Goodman hosted a weekday afternoon talk show on Sirius XM's music discussion channel "Volume".

== See also ==
- MTV

== Bibliography ==
- Greene, Andy (June 14, 2020) [1983]. "Flashback: David Bowie Rips Into MTV for Not Spotlighting Black Artists". Rolling Stone.
