= '90s on 9 =

Sirius XM satellite radio channel

The '90s on 9
- Broadcast area: United States; Canada
- Frequencies: Sirius XM Radio 9 Dish Network 6009

Programming
- Format: 1990s music

Ownership
- Owner: Sirius XM Radio

History
- First air date: September 25, 2001

Technical information
- Class: Satellite radio station

Links
- Website: SiriusXM: '90s on 9

Former XM logo as The '90s prior to Sirius/XM merger on November 12, 2008

The '90s on 9 (or just The '90s) is the name of Sirius XM Radio's 1990s commercial-free music channel, heard on Sirius XM channel 9 and Dish Network channel 6009. The channel focuses mostly on hit-driven R&B, hip-hop, rock, pop, and dance tracks from the 1990s. Occasionally, lesser-known songs are played, preceded by the "five disc CD changer set on random" tagline. Many of the station IDs spoof movies, TV characters, songs and TV commercials that were popular during the decade, and the channel's logo features a compact disc in place of the zero, representing the popularity of CDs in the 1990s.

== History ==
The service signed on September 25, 2001, and broadcasts on Sirius XM channel 9 and on Dish Network channel 6009. It was also heard on DirecTV until February 9, 2010. On November 12, 2008, it was added to Sirius, replacing the original Pulse (which carried a 1990s & hot AC hybrid) on Sirius channel 9, whereas the new Pulse (formerly Flight 26), which solely carries modern AC music, was added to Sirius channel 12. In addition, it also replaced the online-only Super Shuffle channel on Sirius, last heard on satellites in mid-2008. As Sirius's first all-1990s channel since I-90 signed off on November 4, 2002, the channel was jockless from February 3, 2014, when both Jo Jo Morales and KT Harris were let go in a cost-cutting move, until May 26, 2015, when former MTV VJ Downtown Julie Brown, who also hosts the weekend's "Back in the Day Replay Countdown", began hosting the channel on a daily basis.

== Core artists ==
- Backstreet Boys
- Mariah Carey
- Aerosmith
- Alanis Morissette
- Britney Spears
- Nirvana
- Green Day
- Gin Blossoms
- Boyz II Men
- Salt-N-Pepa
- Will Smith
- Janet Jackson
- Michael Jackson
- LL Cool J
- DJ Jazzy Jeff & The Fresh Prince
- Tupac
- Biggie
- En Vogue
- TLC
- Spice Girls
- NSYNC
