= Angela Stribling =

American host and singer (1967–2026)

- Born: October 13, 1967; Buffalo, New York, U.S.
- Died: September 26, 2026 (aged 58); San Carlos, California, U.S.
- Occupations: Television and radio host, classically trained jazz singer
- Organization: BET

Angela Marie Stribling (October 13, 1967 – September 26, 2026) was an American television and radio host and jazz singer best known for her work on BET, where she hosted the show Screen Scene with Melvin Lindsey. She also helped initiate BET on Jazz and hosted several shows in the channel. She hosted radio shows on WHUR, and was the first woman to host the quiet storm on WHUR. She was also a jazz singer.

== Life and career ==
Angela Marie Stribling was reported to have been born on October 13, 1967, though a former colleague at WHUR-FM stated that at the time of her death she was in her 60s, not 58 as she would have been if she was born in October 1967. She was born in Buffalo, New York. She attended Catholic schools and graduated from Kensington High School (Class of 1986) before attending the Fashion Institute of Technology, where she studied fashion merchandising and buying. She has stated that after college she visited Washington, D.C. for a job interview with American Airlines at the same time as a Congressional Black Caucus event, and witnessing the people from the event made her determined to move to the nation's capital.

She ultimately did receive the job with American Airlines, but soon moved into becoming a jazz singer instead. She auditioned for BET at the recommendation of a producer before becoming a relief host: within two months, she became a co-host. She first hosted a show called Screen Scene before moving into jazz-related television programs, where she became one of the initiators of BET on Jazz. She hosted Jazz Central, one of the first jazz-focused five-days-a-week television shows. She also hosted Jazz Discovery and Jazz Scene.

Stribling later worked as a reporter and news intern and also hosted local affairs show On Time, which received a positive review from film critic David Zurawik. He noted Stribling's "ability to get guests to talk about specifics". She also frequently collaborated with Melvin Lindsey.

In the 2010s, she hosted Let's Talk Live on WLJA-FM. The last show she hosted was Pillow Talk with Angela on SiriusXM, which premiered in 2014 and aired from midnight to 2 am. She was also the first woman to host the quiet storm show on WHUR-FM, which had been created by Lindsey.

She also appeared on the fifth season of The Real Housewives of Potomac and had a cameo on The Distinguished Gentleman. She appeared in many ads. She also hosted national activism campaigns. According to her family, she was the voice of the Black Engineer of the Year awards.

During her career, she had interviewed Janet Jackson, Quincy Jones, and Bill Clinton, among others. She called herself "a jazz singer first".

As a singer she had performed with Chaka Khan and Stevie Wonder, among others. One of the performances she cited as a favorite was for a tribute to Charles Rangel. She has stated one of the most influential pieces of advice she received was when Khan told her to not "ever sing a song unless you absolutely love it", which she has asserted was influential to her future choices of music. She also composed many of her own songs. Locations she had performed at include the Rainbow Room.

In 2024, she was diagnosed with brain cancer. Her family announced on September 27, 2026, that she had died the previous day. Stribling was 58 years old.
