= Roger Wolfe Kahn =

American composer, bandleader, test pilot (1907–1962)

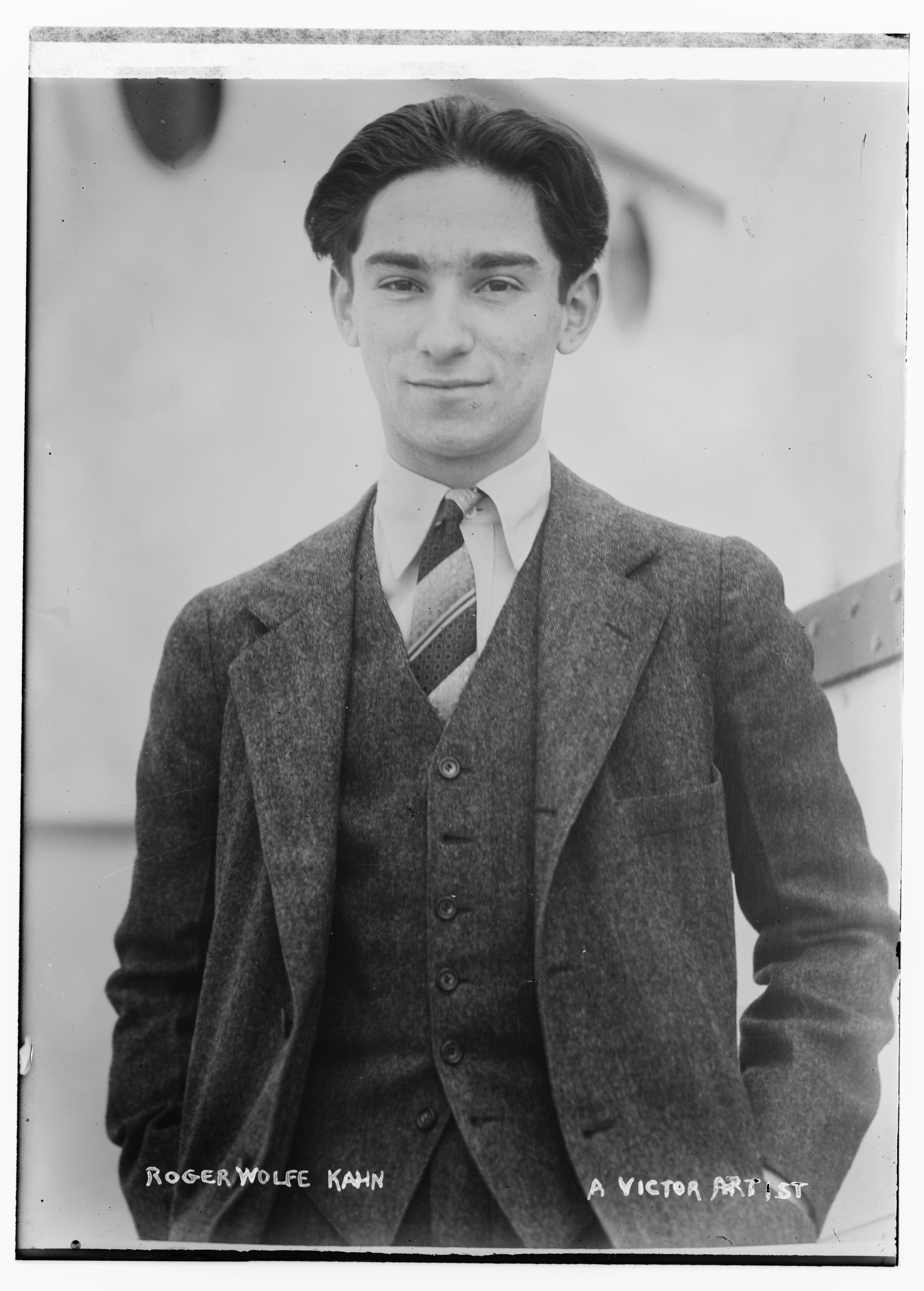
- Kahn circa 1925

Background information
- Born: Roger Wolff Kahn; October 19, 1907; Morristown, New Jersey, U.S.
- Died: July 12, 1962 (aged 54) New York City, U.S.
- Genres: Jazz, popular
- Occupations: Bandleader, composer, test pilot, aviator
- Instruments: Saxophone, violin, drums, piano
- Years active: 1924–1934

Roger Wolfe Kahn (October 19, 1907 – July 12, 1962) was an American jazz and popular musician, composer, bandleader (Roger Wolfe Kahn and His Orchestra) and an aviator.

== Life and career ==
Roger Wolfe Kahn (originally spelled "Wolff") was born in Morristown, New Jersey, into a wealthy German Jewish banking family. His parents were Adelaide "Addie" (Wolff) and Otto Hermann Kahn, a famous banker and patron of the arts. His maternal grandfather was banker Abraham Wolff. Otto and Roger Kahn were the first father and son to appear separately on the cover of Time magazine: Otto in November 1925 and Roger in September 1927, aged 19.

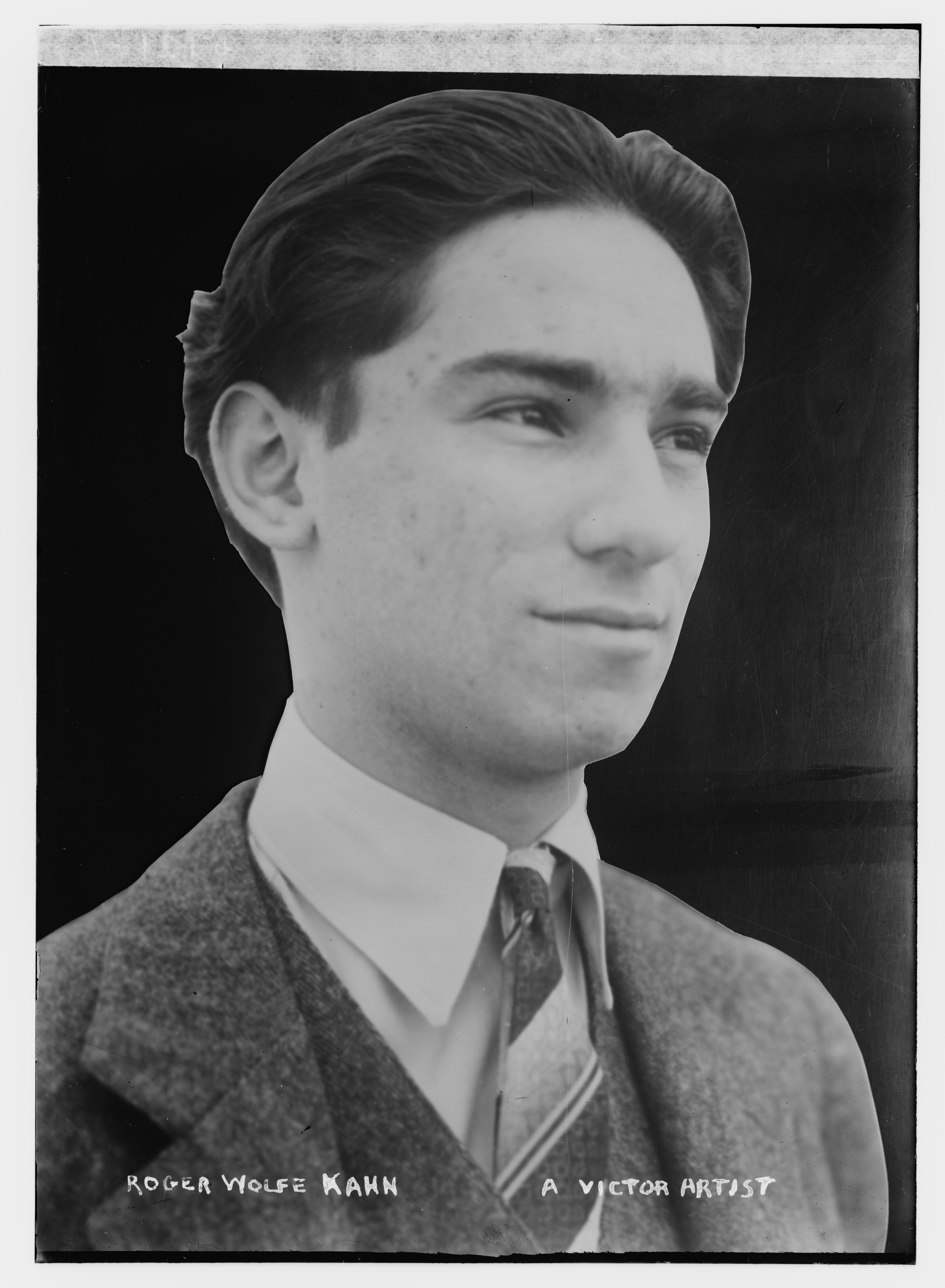
Roger Wolfe Kahn -- A Victor Artist

On August 16, 1926, Time wrote: "If it is strange that Otto Hermann Kahn, sensitive patron of high art in Manhattan, should have a saxophone-tooting, banjo-plunking, clarinet-wailing, violin-jazzing son, it is stranger still that that son, Roger Wolfe Kahn, has become a truly outstanding jazzer at the perilous age of 18. Roger's ten orchestras, one of which he leads, have netted him some $30,000".

Kahn began studying the violin aged six and is said to have learned to play eighteen musical instruments before starting to lead his own orchestra in 1923, aged only 16. At the age of ten, Kahn had bought a ukulele in a Ditson Music Shop in Manhattan together with special-priced instruction on how to play; such was his keen interest in music. The ukulele lured him away from his studies at St. Bernard's School and turned his mind toward violins, pianos, banjos and jazz orchestras.

At St. Bernard's he took no more interest in athletics than he did in studies or in social activities. By the age of sixteen, he’d rejected studying at college. Instead, he formed his own booking agency and organized a paying band and installed it at the Knickerbocker Grill in New York. He could play every instrument in the outfit, all self-taught, and his favorite instruments to play were the piano and saxophone. By the time he reached nineteen, he had eleven orchestras on his books that played in resorts and hotels from Newport, Rhode Island to Florida. They’d netted him personally an average of $50,000 a year for the four years of their existence. His success enabled him to pursue his passion for composing music and aviation.

In 1925, Kahn appeared in a short film made in Lee De Forest's Phonofilm sound-on-film process. Kahn hired many famous jazz musicians and singers of the day to play and sing in his band, especially during recording sessions (e.g.) Tommy Dorsey, Morton Downey, Joe Venuti, Eddie Lang, Artie Shaw, Jack Teagarden, Red Nichols, Libby Holman, Gertrude Niesen, Franklyn Baur, Dick Robertson, Elmer Feldkamp and Gene Krupa. Early on in his career, Kahn made several recordings under the name Roger Wolfe Kahn and His Hotel Biltmore Orchestra. It was during September 1925, that Joe Venuti joined the Kahn Orchestra during their residency at the New York Biltmore Hotel.

On December 15, 1925, Kahn and his Orchestra recorded four takes of the song "Rhythm Of The Day" for Victor Records and for some reason Victor chose not to release any of them. Undeterred, Kahn wrote the song "Following You Around", which made him money and George Whiteman went on to arrange the score of Kahn’s stage musical Rhapsurdity. Another musical comedy Kahn wrote, (a satire on musical comedy) called Hearts and Flowers, was produced by Horace Liveright.

He made recordings for:

- Victor 1925–29,
- Brunswick 1929–30,
- Columbia in 1932.

In February 1926, Kahn's recording of "I'm Sitting On Top Of The World" charted at #9. It was reported in Variety, (September 29, 1926); "Roger Wolfe Kahn and his original Victor orchestra of eleven are getting $4200 for five and a half days booking commencing October 4 at the New Orpheum Palace, Chicago, which Kahn's band will headline at the opening attraction. The Kahn outfit returns to the Albee, Brooklyn, NY followed by the Palace Theatre, New York, following which they commence rehearsals for their new cafe, Le Perroquet de Paris, scheduled for opening in November".

Kahn fronted several fashionable night clubs in New York. One of his own clubs, Le Perroquet de Paris, opened in New York in November 1926 with a five-dollar cover charge. On August 16, 1926, Time magazine wrote: "Last week, Roger announced his purchase of Giro's (night club) in Manhattan; his partner is Rene Racover of the Perroquet in Paris (France); his resort's new name is Perroquet de Paris." Kahn spent $250,000 of his father’s money on decorating the club and installing a silver stage proscenium. The club had a mirrored dance floor and aquariums beneath the individual tables and Kahn made a point of following the Parisian example of giving expensive souvenirs to the women that visited his clubs. At Le Perroquet de Paris he gave each female guest a bottle of premier perfume. Variety magazine reported Le Perroquet de Paris to be, "the last gasp in smart night clubs. Ultra artistic with an ultra 'In following' (with) the millionaire maestro's own crack dance band. Be sure to make it. $5 couvert."

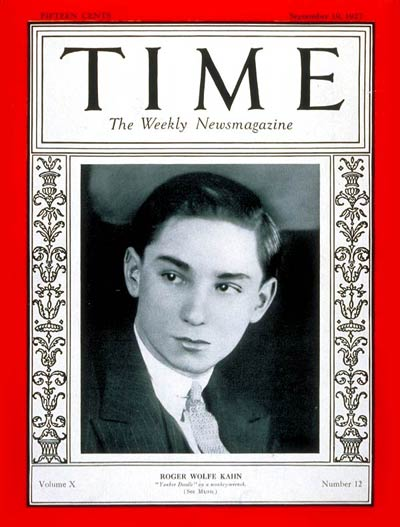
Roger Wolfe Kahn on the cover of Time magazine (September 19, 1927)

In 1927, Kahn produced two Vitaphone film shorts called Night Club. One short featured an act called the Williams Sisters (a singing/dancing duo). Both shorts were filmed on February 14, 1927, at the Manhattan Opera House on 315 West 34th Street in New York, and the Williams Sisters were featured in the short numbered Vitaphone #469 as 'signing and dancing youngsters' performing a number titled "Thinking of You." The Vitaphone film was an early attempt at sound movies which used both film and disk for sound. A reviewer in the San Antonio Express, April 10, 1927, wrote: "Roger Wolfe Kahn's specialty on the Vitaphone is undoubtedly the best subject offered since the installation of the devise. His instrumental harmony is wonderful and original... and the Williams Sisters act brings the act above par for any circuit." A copy of the sound disk supposedly exists at the Library of Congress in Washington, but the film elements are missing and presumed lost.

During 1927, Kahn hired Hannah Williams from the Williams Sisters to dance in a revue at his New York Night Club, Le Perroquet de Paris. It was during her engagement at the club that she popularised the song, "Hard Hearted Hannah (The Vamp of Savannah)". In 1928, Kahn co-wrote the jazz standard "Crazy Rhythm" with Irving Caesar and Joseph Meyer for the Broadway musical Here's Howe.

Kahn always had fun leading and conducting his orchestra. Reportedly, when the band was playing especially well he used to throw himself onto the floor and wave his legs in the air. However, the passion Kahn had for music was usurped by his deeper passion for flying and it was during his many trips accompanying his parents to Europe that Kahn developed his aviation skills. During one trip to France he chartered his own plane in Paris and flew it to London. Unlike the transatlantic hero, Charles Lindbergh, who after his triumphant arrival in Paris was to cross the English Channel by air the same day and had to postpone the flight on account of a heavy fog, Kahn flew anyway. As well as owning a string of expensive motor vehicles and a speedboat, Kahn went on to purchase a stunt airplane, which he flew to compete in transcontinental races. Kahn’s love of ‘speed’ became an ongoing worry for his parents.

== Aviation career ==
On March 29, 1934, Kahn’s father, Otto Hermann Kahn died. Doubtless, his father’s sudden and unexpected death played a major role in Kahn reassessing his own life and career. Kahn's interest in aviation was no secret; he was already a member of the Advisory Board for the American Society for the Promotion of Aviation. He joined as early as 1928 and in 1933, Kahn had become a test pilot for Grumman Aircraft Engineering Corporation on Long Island, a well-known aircraft manufacturer. Kahn would later excel in the role of managing the technical service and sales division of Grumman Aircraft Engineering Corporation and Grumman built a special sales aircraft, known as a G-58B (a modified F8F Bearcat fighter plane), in which he toured numerous military bases across North America during his career with the company. In 1943, Kahn was chairman of the Institute of Aeronautical Sciences and later became its vice-president . In 1956, Kahn became a member of the Laura Taber Barbour Air Safety Award Board (LTBASAB). Kahn also became chairman of the National Aeronautic Association (NAA).

== The Kahn Orchestra 1938 reunion concert ==
In 1938, the Kahn Orchestra re-formed to perform a special one-off concert, in what could have been the Kahn Orchestra’s last concert. The show was held in honor of the unveiling of the Golden Age Aviation Mural installed at Roosevelt Field Airport: the mural was painted by the artist Aline Rhonie Hofheimer (a pilot herself) who had been commissioned to paint a fresco mural on the north brick wall of Roosevelt Field Hangar F. The mural commemorated the history of aviation from 1908 to 1927 ending with Charles Lindbergh's trans-Atlantic flight. After the mural was completed, there was an artist's reception and party held at Roosevelt Field Airport on October 15, 1938. The invitations read, "You are invited to attend a party and barn dance given in honor of Aline Rhonie commemorating her achievement in the completion of the world’s largest aviation fresco depicting the history of aviation." It was at this reception that ‘"A" Roger Wolfe Kahn Orchestra’ performed. That might have meant a tribute-type band, or it may have been that Rhonie was able to use her pilot network to coax Kahn to reform a band to perform during this special occasion. The party ran from ten in the evening until dawn. The New York Times on October 17, 1938, reported, "The fresco was unveiled at a party on Saturday night, attended by more than 500 guests. This all-night party, with informal dress, was probably THE event for October at Roosevelt Field." It doesn't mention in the report whether Kahn himself fronted the orchestra.

=== Discography ===
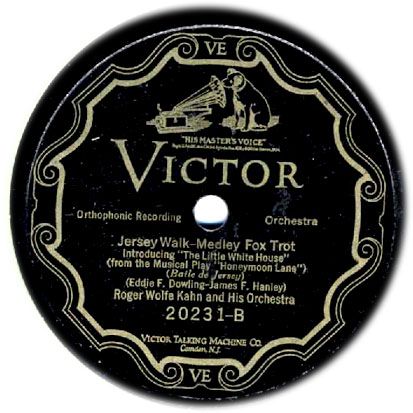
Roger Wolfe Kahn, Jersey Walk

- Hot Hot Hottentot
- Mountain Greenery
- One Night In the Jungle
- Nobody Loves Me
- Following You Around
- One Summer Night
- Cross Your Heart
- Sometimes I'm Happy
- I'm Sitting on Top of the World
- Jersey Walk
- Tell Me Tonight
- Tonight You Belong to Me
- A Cup of Coffee, a Sandwich and You
- I Can't Believe That You're in Love with Me
- Anything You Say
- Crazy Rhythm (later used in Woody Allen's film Bullets Over Broadway (1994))
- Imagination
- Liza
- Russian Lullaby
- She's a Great Great Girl (the closing theme song of WAMU's Hot Jazz Saturday Night hosted by Rob Bamberger) Also notable for the lengthy early solo by Jack Teagarden.
- A Shine On Your Shoes
- Lazy Day
- It Don't Mean a Thing (If It Ain't Got That Swing)
- My Silent Love

=== Broadway shows ===
- Vogues (1924) - revue
- Here's Howe (1928) – musical – co-composer
- Americana (1928) – revue – composer
- 9:15 Revue (February 11, 1930) – revue - (Cohan Theatre, N. Y.) (contributing composer)

=== Filmography ===
- The Yacht Party - (1932) Directed by Roy Mack – cast: Roger Wolfe Kahn, Gertrude Niesen, Melissa Mason (contortionist), Eaton Boys, Chauncey Morehouse (drums), Artie Shaw (clarinet). The film is shot on board a yacht and includes Kahn and his Orchestra playing "Way Down Yonder in New Orleans", "Dinah" and "Lullaby of the Leaves". Footage towards the end of the film shows an aeroplane flying overhead performing stunts. It was rumoured that Roger Wolfe Kahn flew the plane that performed the stunts.

== The Kahn family ==
Roger Wolfe Kahn was born in Morristown, New Jersey, into a family surrounded by wealth, art and artistic people. He had one elder brother, Gilbert, and two elder sisters, Maude and Margaret Dorothy. The children grew up in Morristown under the direction of their mother, Adelaide Wolff Kahn, where they followed a schedule of lessons interspersed with play. During the weekends, the routine was shattered by the arrival of their father, Otto Kahn, from New York. He diverted them with his undivided attention. Otto Kahn's wisdom in life was to "Live life. Love beauty. Be happy." When Roger was five, he and his family moved from New Jersey to London, where they resided for two years at St Dunstan House in Regent's Park; this was rebuilt as Winfield House in the 1930s and later became the American Ambassador's residence. The house had the largest private garden in London second only to Buckingham Palace. The constant travelling of Kahn during his childhood accompanying his parents to Europe gave him and his siblings a more extensive education than most children received. Kahn's passion for aviation grew from his frequent trips abroad.

In 1931, Kahn made headlines on the New York society pages when he married Broadway musical comedy actress Hannah Williams on January 16. The wedding was held at Oheka Castle, his family's country estate on Long Island. The marriage was kept secret from the public for two weeks, until the final performances of the Broadway show in which Williams was appearing, Sweet and Low. The American public took the newlyweds to their hearts and Kahn referred to his wife as the "Cheerful Little Earful", after the song of the same name which she sang on Broadway. The marriage did not last. The couple made headlines again when they divorced two years later and after only a few weeks, Williams married boxing champion Jack Dempsey. Three days after the divorce, on April 7, 1933, Roger Wolfe Kahn married Edith May Nelson, daughter of a Maine politician, John E. Nelson, and they lived on Muttontown Road, Syosset, Long Island. They had two children, Peter W. Kahn and Dacia W. Kahn. Their marriage lasted until Kahn died of a heart attack in New York City on July 12, 1962.

== In popular culture ==
In the 1979 film The Jerk, listening to a version of Kahn's song "Crazy Rhythm" on the radio inspires Steve Martin's character to hitchhike to St. Louis, setting in motion his rise, fall, and eventual reunion with his adopted family.

Roger Wolfe Kahn and his Orchestra have four song entries in the ‘Top 1000 instrumentals of all time’, no. 360 - "Mountain Greenery", no. 782 - "A Little Bungalow", no. 823 - "Clap Yo' Hands", and at no. 889 - "I'm Sitting on Top of the World".

Two of Roger Wolfe Kahn's recordings as a bandleader, "Into My Heart" and "Exactly Like You", were sampled by The Caretaker for his final project, "Everywhere at the end of time".

== See also ==
- List of covers of Time magazine (1920s)
