= Patrick Ellis =

Patrick Ellis may refer to:

- Patrick Ellis (educator)
- Patrick Ellis (radio host)
