= Sidney August Anthony Miller Jr. =

American radio journalist, music Industry executive

- Born: Sidney August Anthony Miller Jr. December 13, 1932; Pensacola, Florida, U.S.
- Died: January 20, 2022 (aged 89); Arlington County, Virginia, U.S.
- Education: B.A.
- Alma mater: Florida A&M
- Occupations: Actor, journalist, magazine editor
- Notable credit: The BRE Conference Black Radio Announcers Convention

Sidney August Anthony Miller II (December 13, 1932 – January 20, 2022) was an American music industry executive and had a conference that annually showcased black talent.

== Early life and education ==
Miller was born in Pensacola, Florida, to Sidney Augustus (1890–1972) and Evelyn (Maddox) Miller. He attended Booker T. Washington High School in his hometown. Upon graduating, he enrolled at Florida A&M University as a pre-med student. Despite his academic pursuits, Miller's passion for music led him to play the trumpet in the university band. While at Florida A&M, Miller capitalized on his musical talents and connections by starting a side business booking music acts. Notably, he booked jazz musicians Nat and Cannonball Adderley, who were also attending the university at the time. While still a student, he immersed himself in the vibrant club circuit along the East Coast, gaining valuable insights into the music industry.

Post-college, having been part of the R.O.T.C. program, Miller joined the Army as an officer and served in Texas. Even during his military service, he continued to book music acts on the side, including the Adderley Brothers.

In 1970, while walking near the Capitol Records tower in Hollywood, Miller's attention was caught by a Florida license plate on a parked car. Inside, he met Susan Marie Enzor and her sister Dottie, who were on a cross-country adventure. This chance encounter led to a relationship, and subsequently, Sidney Miller and Susan Marie Enzor married.

== Capitol Records ==
In the 1960s, Miller's career in the music industry took a significant turn when he joined Capitol Records. He initially led Capitol's Fame subsidiary in Atlanta before moving to Los Angeles, where he eventually became the head of the promotions division. This role placed him in charge of promoting various genres, including country & western, pop, and R&B.

During his career, Miller made significant contributions to the record industry while working at Capitol Records. Working under the guidance of Artie Mogull, Miller collaborated with renowned artists such as Helen Reddy, Joe South, The Fortunes, and Cannonball Adderley.

== NATRA ==
His dedication to promoting and supporting Black music artists led him to make a bold move. Believing strongly in the potential and importance of a publication specifically targeted to this market, he made significant personal sacrifices. He sold his house, his car, and invested his savings into launching Black Radio Exclusive (BRE) magazine.

In 1976, the first issue of BRE was introduced to the NATRA Convention in Antigua, swiftly gaining recognition as the first major magazine focused on Black music. Miller's unwavering belief in the power of a publication dedicated to this genre propelled BRE to become a prominent voice in the music industry, celebrating the achievements of Black music artists and amplifying their impact.

== BRE Convention ==
In addition to the magazine, Miller instituted the Annual BRE Conference, a prestigious gathering of key national and international Music figures. Superstars performing have included Prince, Marvin Gaye, Stevie Wonder, Michael Jackson, Tina Turner, Mariah Carey, Sade, L.L. Cool J, Hammer, and many more. Naughty By Nature was discovered at BRE. Hammer begged to be allowed on stage at a Los Angeles conference and then took off. Stevie Wonder composed a special song for BRE.

Miller embarked on a venture called Hollywood Live, which marked the inception of the first-ever live radio show of its kind. This show not only utilized satellite technology but also introduced the feature of 1-800 call-in numbers, allowing music enthusiasts to actively engage and participate. The host for this show was DJ Frankie Crocker, celebrated for his work on New York's WBLS.

In addition to his work, Sidney Miller Jr. established the BRE conferences and the Drummer Awards to expand the reach of BRE magazine. These events highlighted Black music and served as platforms for introducing emerging artists to wider audiences.

The Drummer Awards, accompanied by sold-out shows in major venues across the country, became synonymous with unforgettable performances from music legends and rising stars alike. These events showcased well-known artists like Mariah Carey, MC Hammer, Sade, Boyz II Men, Kirk Franklin, The Commodores, Naughty by Nature, and Maxwell. Performances from icons like Bob Marley, Aretha Franklin, Stevie Wonder, Prince, Michael Jackson, Marvin Gaye, Tina Turner, and James Brown solidified the Drummer Awards' status in the music industry.

== Awards ==
NAACP Image Award: Sidney Miller was a recipient of the prestigious NAACP Image Award, which is given by the National Association for the Advancement of Colored People to honor outstanding performances in film, television, music, and literature by people of color.

Living Legends A.D. Washington Chairman's Award: On October 4, 2019, Miller was honored with the A.D. Washington Chairman's Award by the Living Legends Foundation. This accolade was in recognition of his extraordinary contributions to the music industry, particularly for his work in promoting Black music and artists through his career and his publication, "Black Radio Exclusive" magazine. .

== Controversies ==
During the 1988 "Black Radio Exclusive" conference, a panel discussed the impact of rap music, particularly addressing concerns that it might reinforce negative stereotypes of Black people. The controversy highlighted the cultural tension surrounding rap music's influence at the time.

Ice-T, a prominent figure in rap, shared at the conference that he had been banned in Detroit due to authorities claiming his music was popular among drug dealers and gang members. However, he also noted the irony that he was called upon to speak to the youth about gang issues because of his influence on them, underscoring a contradiction in public perception versus practical influence.

In December 1990, Miller used his publisher's note to voice concerns over Japanese companies acquiring American entertainment businesses. He referenced derogatory comments made by Japanese officials about Black people, which stirred controversy regarding foreign investment and racial attitudes.

== Boards and philanthropies ==
Sidney Miller Jr. also dedicated his time and expertise to several notable organizations and foundations. His commitment to philanthropy and supporting various causes showcased his deep sense of community and his desire to make a positive impact.

Miller served on the board of the NARAS MusiCares Foundation, an organization that provides critical assistance to music professionals in times of need. His involvement in this foundation demonstrates his commitment to supporting fellow musicians and industry professionals.

Recognizing the importance of giving back, Miller also served on the boards of the Evander Holyfield Foundation, the National Black Programmers Coalition, the New Orleans Music Commission, the Atlanta Music Commission, and the Washington, D.C. Music Commission. Through these roles, he actively contributed to the development and growth of music in various communities, fostering opportunities and advocating for the recognition of diverse talent.

== Death ==
Miller died on January 20, 2022, in Arlington, Virginia, as a result of complications from COVID-19 amidst the COVID-19 pandemic in Virginia. He was 89 years old.

== See also ==
Joseph Deighton Gibson Jr.
