= Rob Bamberger =

Jazz historian & host of well-known jazz program

Rob Bamberger is a jazz historian and collector best known for his long-running program Hot Jazz Saturday Night, which has run for more than 40 years on WAMU Radio, 88.5, a public broadcasting radio station in the Washington, D.C. area.

Bamberger grew up in Shaker Heights, Ohio, and experienced an epiphany in 1963 after picking up for ten cents a two-record set of Tommy Dorsey broadcast performances at a book fair at his elementary school. While working as an energy policy analyst at the Congressional Research Service, he began volunteering at WAMU and, in 1980, created his own jazz show, Hot Jazz Saturday night. On the program, he plays selections from the large jazz collection that fills the entire basement of his Arlington Virginia home, and discusses both the musicians and the music for the benefit of his listeners.

Bamberger continues the show as a part-time employee of the radio station (with a short break after WAMU decided to jettison all programing besides news and talk, described in Hot Jazz Saturday Night). During that interregnum, he produced a similar program for WOWD in Takoma Park. He lectures on jazz at the Library of Congress, the Smithsonian and other venues, and has written the liner notes for dozens of jazz albums. He also was the lead author of a Congressionally-mandated study of the deterioration of the archive of recorded music, with particular reference to pre-1972 recordings.

After Bamberger retired from the Congressional Research Service in 2010, he studied for a Masters in Social Work to pursue a second career in senior care. He currently works at Iona Senior Services where he facilitates support groups for the children, spouses and partners of individuals with dementia and similar chronic conditions, and serves on the Steering Committee and faculty of the Aging Program of the New Washington School of Psychiatry.
