= Kojo Nnamdi =

American radio personality, journalist (born 1945)

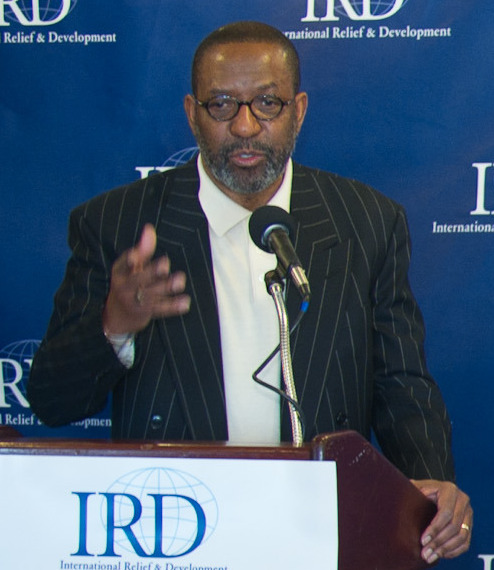
- Nnamdi in 2010
- Born: Rex Orville Montague Paul; January 8, 1945 (age 81); Georgetown, British Guiana
- Education: University of the District of Columbia
- Presenting career
- Show: The Kojo Nnamdi Show and The Politics Hour – (WAMU); Evening Exchange – (WHUT)
- Stations: WAMU (radio); WHUT (television)
- Country: United States
- Website: wamu.org/programs/kn

Rex Orville Montague Paul (born January 8, 1945), better known as Kojo Nnamdi (/ˈkoʊdʒoʊ ˈnɑːmdi/ KOH-joh NAHM-dee), is a Guyanese-born American radio journalist based in Washington, D. C. He is the host of The Politics Hour on WAMU, and hosted “The Kojo Nnamdi Show” and Evening Exchange broadcast on WHUT-TV from 1985 to 2011.

== Early life ==
Nnamdi was born Rex Orville Montague Paul in British Guiana on January 8, 1945. As a high school student, Nnamdi and his friends opposed British colonialism, at odds with their parents.

In 1967, a year after Guyana became independent from British rule, Nnamdi moved to Montreal, Canada to attend McGill University after his mother secretly saved her earnings from selling insurance and filled out an application on his behalf. While attending McGill, Nnamdi became interested in the Black Power movement. After a year at McGill, Nnamdi moved to the New York City borough of Brooklyn in the U.S., where he worked on Wall Street and joined the Black Panther Party. However, not long after joining the Panthers, Nnamdi drifted out of the Party. Nnamdi had been seeking a Black Nationalist and Pan-Africanism supporting organisation, whereas by this time the Black Panthers had embraced internationalism and were committed to working with people of all races towards a socialist America. It would not be until later in life that Nnamdi would embrace Marxist theory as the Panthers had.

Nnamdi moved to Washington, D.C. in 1969 and enrolled in Federal City College, now the University of the District of Columbia. While attending the college, Nnamdi joined former members of the Student Nonviolent Coordinating Committee to form the Center for Black Education.

== Broadcasting career ==
=== Early radio career (1969–1985) ===
Nnamdi began his radio career in 1969 as an actor and director for children's plays that aired Sundays on Washington rhythm and blues radio station WOL. With the on-air name "Brother Uwezo", Nnamdi became editor for Sauti, a news magazine program on WOL, in 1970. After marrying in 1971, he adopted the on-air name that he would use for the rest of his career, Kojo Nnamdi. He described it as an "African Christian name and surname that made more sense", first name "Kojo" being an Akan name for "Monday" and surname "Nnamdi" after the first President of Nigeria, Nnamdi Azikiwe.

In 1973, Nnamdi became news editor at WHUR, the radio station of Howard University, a historically black university in Washington. Later becoming news director, Nnamdi helped produce The Daily Drum, a local news program.

=== Evening Exchange (1985–2011) ===
Nnamdi left WHUR in 1985 to join Howard television station WHMM (later WHUT) as host of Evening Exchange, a public affairs show. Nnamdi hosted Evening Exchange until 2011.

On June 13, 1990, Evening Exchange received its highest viewership numbers when Washington mayor Marion Barry announced on the show that he would not seek a fourth term.

=== Public Interest and The Kojo Nnamdi Show (1998–present) ===
On August 31, 1998, Nnamdi became host of Public Interest on Washington public radio station WAMU, a show renamed from The Derek McGinty Show. In January of that year, previous host Derek McGinty left WAMU for CBS News. A two-hour program, one hour focused on local issues and was broadcast exclusively on WAMU, and the other discussed national topics and was distributed by National Public Radio (NPR) to around 40 stations. On September 30, 2002, Public Interest was renamed The Kojo Nnamdi Show and dropped national distribution.

On Fridays, Nnamdi hosts The Politics Hour, which covers topics related to political issues and events in the Washington, D.C. metropolitan area, including surrounding Maryland and Virginia regions. Before May 2008, the show was titled The D.C. Politics Hour and focused solely on the D.C.-area political scene. The show was renamed The Politics Hour in May 2008, after WAMU fired resident political analyst and Washington Examiner columnist Jonetta Rose Barras over a salary dispute. The show then featured guest analysts until the long-term hiring of WRC-TV political reporter Tom Sherwood in February 2009.

Barras joined the program after the late Mark Plotkin left in April 2002 to set up shop at all-news station WTOP, where he hosted The Politics Program. Originally called The Politics Hour, the name of Plotkin's show was changed after WAMU threatened a lawsuit. Nonetheless, Plotkin said in a 2006 online chat that he and Nnamdi remain friendly and regularly have dinner together.

Every Tuesday the first half of the show consists of a segment called Tech Tuesday that attempts to keep listeners current on various computer/computing and technology issues. For a number of years, the first Tuesday of the month featured "The Computer Guys," John Gilroy and Tom Pivovar. Pivovar left the program in early 2006 in a contract dispute and has been since replaced with a rotation of recurring expert guests, most of whom are employed at either Mid-Atlantic Consulting or the University of Maryland, College Park.

On April 1, 2021, Nnamdi ended his daily program, but continued to host the Politics Hour.
