= Imhotep Gary Byrd =

American broadcaster

- Born: March 14, 1949 (age 77)
- Occupations: Radio broadcaster, poet, songwriter, music recording artist and producer, writer and community activist

Imhotep Gary Byrd (born March 14, 1949) is an American, New York City–based radio talk-show host and executive producer, radio DJ, poet, songwriter, music recording artist and producer, rapper, writer and community activist.

Byrd began his career in Buffalo, New York, in 1965, as a 15-year-old radio DJ. In 2015, he celebrated 50 years as a radio personality.

For more than 30 years, he has been a talk show host at WBLS and WLIB radio in New York City.

Gary Byrd and the GB Experience was an American mixed-gender vocal and instrumental group, which had a single titled "The Crown", in the UK Singles Chart. It was released on the Motown label, entered the chart on July 23, 1983, at number 21, and rose to a high of number 6; it remained in the chart for nine weeks. It had previously been released in the US on Stevie Wonder's short-lived Wondirection label but did not receive the proper promotion because its release coincided with the purchase of Motown by MCA Records, where the small label was overlooked.

== Radio ==
Byrd began his career in Buffalo, New York, on WUFO in the 1960s, discovered and mentored by broadcaster-educator Hank Cameron as a radio prodigy at age 15. As a teen, he integrated Buffalo broadcasting as a radio personality on the general market McLendon station WYSL. By the age of 19, he was tapped by radio programmer Jerry Boulding to be a DJ on soul station WWRL, where he created his music infotainment show, "The GBE: The Gary Byrd Experience."

Since the 1980s (after being hired by Percy Sutton & Hal Jackson, co-founders of Inner City Broadcasting), he has been a talk show host on WLIB, WBLS and WBAI. During the 1990s, he created the "Global Black Experience," a live broadcast for the Apollo Theater.

During the 1980s, Byrd was also a radio and television personality in England, hosting shows on the BBC and other British networks. His 1984 BBC television special with Gil Scott Heron and James Brown earned national awards.

Currently, Byrd can also be heard nationally as "The Voice" of Sirius XM’s Soul Town Channel ("Classic Soul & Motown"). His weekly talk and music program, "Radio GBE," is heard live every week on Pacifica radio station WBAI.

== Music ==
Byrd is also a poet, author, performer, spoken word artist, and lyricist. A collaborator with Stevie Wonder, Byrd served as lyricist on Wonder’s "Village Ghetto Land" and "Black Man" on his album Songs in the Key of Life. Byrd also co-wrote three other songs with Wonder: "Dark n' Lovely," a tribute to the anti-apartheid movement in South Africa, "Front Line," from the 1982 Stevie Wonder's Original Musiquarium I album, and "Misrepresented People," for the soundtrack of Spike Lee’s movie Bamboozled, in which Byrd appears, playing himself as a radio talk show host.

Over the years, music he co-wrote has been sampled and covered. George Michael performed "Village Ghetto Land" at a special London tribute to Nelson Mandela, where Wonder sang "Dark-N-Lovely." Byrd has also written songs for other artists from Kurtis Blow’s "Feelin Good" to "I Cry" for Millie Jackson, which have been sampled dozens of times by a long list of hip hop artists including 50 Cent, Nas, Eazy-E, and others.

As an artist on RCA Records in the 1970s, Byrd recorded his first album, Presenting The Gary Byrd Experience. Later, Byrd recorded single "Soul Traveling (Inside the G.B.E.)" with Jimmy Castor & The Bunch, also on RCA Records. Its intro was sampled by Soul II Soul on the song "Jazzie's Groove".

In 1982, Byrd wrote and performed his first single, "Every Brother Ain't a Brother", on Real Thing Records. It was published after demand for the original poem from his WWRL overnight radio audience, on his overnight show "The GBE: The Gary Byrd Experience."

"The Crown", 12" version ran for 10 minutes 35 seconds, making it one of the longest tracks ever to appear in the UK Singles Chart. It was written by Gary Byrd and Stevie Wonder, and presented a wide-ranging historical narrative of human progress (beginning with the ancient Egyptians and continuing to the present day) with an emphasis on African heritage. It featured spoken/rapped verses by Byrd, with one verse sung by Wonder and Crystal Blake. Byrd described the song at the time thus: "The idea is not that black, white or anyone is better, but that we all have our place. We've all made contributions - and mistakes too. Wearing the crown is reaching the top of your potential. You could be a writer or you could be a mechanic, but you can still wear the crown."

=== Present day ===
Currently, his tri-state arts & entertainment community column "Imhotep’s Guide To Black Events" runs weekly in the New York Amsterdam News, one of the nation's oldest African American newspapers.

Byrd’s "Express Yourself" broadcasts are now available to listeners on a variety of multiple media platforms. The simulcast WBLS and WLIB talk show is available globally at WBLS.com, WLIB.com, WBLS-HD2, and iHeart radio. "iGBE: Imhotep Gary Byrd’s Express Yourself" programming is also interactive in real time on his Facebook page.

== Legacy ==
In 1973, James Brown dedicated the song "Mind Power" from his The Payback album to Byrd.

== See also ==
- Frankie Crocker
- Hal Jackson
- Kool DJ Red Alert
- Bob Perkins (radio)
- Vaughn Harper
