= Vaughn Harper =

American disc jockey (1945–2016)

- Born: March 1, 1945; New York City, New York
- Died: July 9, 2016 (aged 71); Englewood, New Jersey
- Occupations: DJ, announcer
- Awards: Black Radio Exclusives "2008 Jeep Unlimited Radio Personality of The Year", an inductee to The Living Legends Hall of Fame, the #4 spot as "Best Urban DJ of all-time"

Vaughn Harper (March 1, 1945 – July 9, 2016) was an American broadcast announcer and DJ.

== Early life ==
Harper played high school basketball at Boys High School in Brooklyn and was an All American standout rebounder that played in the NIT tournament with his alma mater Syracuse University. After spending a brief stint with the EPBL which garnered him a try-out with the Detroit Pistons, he was selected in the sixth round of the 1968 NBA draft as their #57 pick. Harper was not chosen by the team. He would also be drafted by the Denver Rockets in the 1967 American Basketball Association draft.

== Orangeman ==
Harper played on the Orangemen squad as a starter from 1966 to 1968, as a sophomore he started in all but three games for Syracuse in the NCAA East Region tourney. Despite playing in only three varsity campaigns he is 10th on the Orangemen's all-time rebounding chart. As a senior, Harper led the Orangemen in scoring, averaging 13.5 points per game for his career. In 1967 the starting five, George Hicker, Rick Dean, Steve Ludd, Ritchie Cornwall and Harper were 19–2 and ranked 8th in the nation before losing four of the last five games of the season. In a game against Colgate, Harper pulled down 23 rebounds. Because of his leaping ability, and the lack of height on the team, Harper jumped center for most of his Syracuse career. With a 130 I.Q. he took off his sophomore year to put more time to art prep, Upon graduation, he was drafted by the Detroit Pistons in the 6th round of the 1968 draft, but failed to make the team due to an injury during training camp to his knee.

== Radio ==
As one of the deejays mentored by Frankie Crocker on WBLS, Harper entered radio in 1976. In May 1983, WBLS hired Champaine, a woman deejay, and together Harper and Champaine developed a quiet storm late night format patterned after the successful show which had been introduced by WHUR jock Melvin Lindsey in 1976. Others took to the format but WBLS had greater reach and more listenership. The Harper/Champaine quiet storm program became a staple that lasted thru station changeovers and garnered a following in the New York Market. With a deep, mellifluous voice, listeners said Harper sounded romantic, eliciting a peaceful respite at the end of the day.

While at WBLS he also, with Ken 'Spider' Webb, lent his basketball talents to the station team, the WBLS-Sureshots, which played local teams for charity. Rival stations WBLS and WRKS both competed together and their games packed out Madison Square Garden twice.

In 1979 along with his co-horts Ken Webb, Johnny Allen, and Frankie Crocker, WBLS reached #1 in the Billboard Radio rankings as rated by Arbitron.

In 1993 Harper suffered a stroke and spent years effecting a comeback. In his absence, Champaine hosted Quiet Storm II on WBLS. Harper left WBLS for WWRL in 1997. Reading live ads upon returning to radio in 1998 had improved his delivery to his pre-stroke professionalism and at WBGO-FM he felt the energy returning to his program. Listeners will get a certain energy from me he promised.

In 2008, Harper lent his voice to Grand Theft Auto IV, as himself, a DJ on one of the in-game radio stations, The Vibe 98.8.

Harper rejoined WBLS and continued as a radio host until 2008.

== Death ==
Harper died on July 9, 2016, at the age of 71 in Englewood, New Jersey.

== Album appearances ==
- Full Force - Don't Sleep! (1992)
- Silk - Tonight (1999)
- Meli'sa Morgan - I Remember (2009)

== See also ==
- Hal Jackson
- Yvonne Daniels
- Imhotep Gary Byrd
- Kool DJ Red Alert
- Jonathan Toubin
- WEPN-FM
