= WHUT-TV =

Television station in Washington, D.C.

ATSC 3.0 station

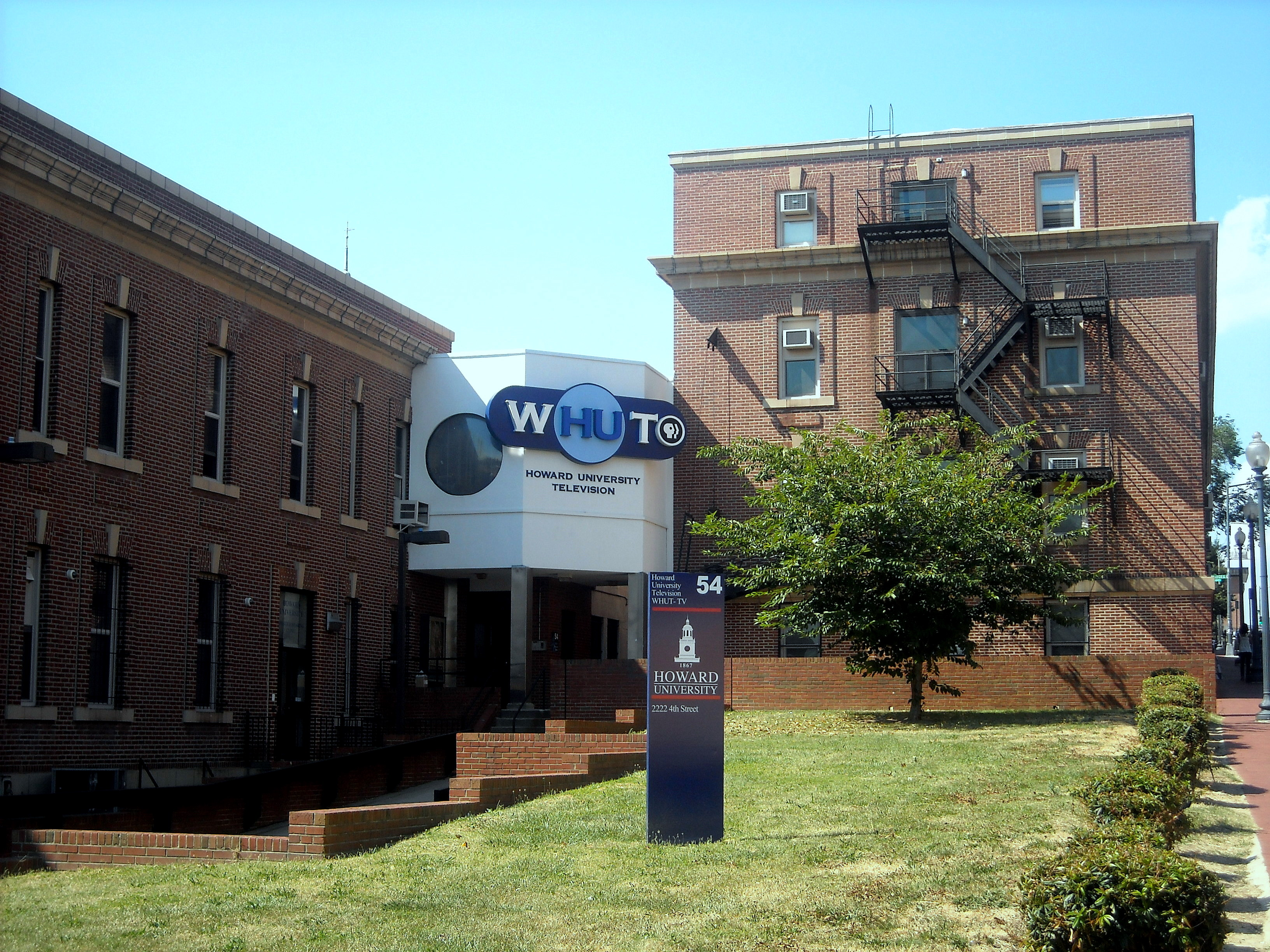
- WHUT-TV studios on the Howard campus
- Washington, D.C.; United States
- Channels: Digital: 33 (UHF); Virtual: 32
- Branding: WHUT

Programming
- Affiliations: 32.1: PBS; 32.2: PBS Kids

Ownership
- Owner: Howard University
- Sister stations: WHUR-FM

History
- Founded: June 25, 1974
- First air date: November 17, 1980
- Former call signs: WHMM (CP, 1974–1980); WHMM-TV (1980–1998)
- Former channel numbers: Analog: 32 (UHF, 1980–2009)
- Call sign meaning: Howard University Television

Technical information
- Licensing authority: FCC
- Facility ID: 27772
- ERP: 416 kW
- HAAT: 254 m (833 ft)
- Transmitter coordinates: 38°57′1″N 77°4′46″W

Links
- Public license information: Public file; LMS
- Website: www.whut.org

WHUT-TV (channel 32) is the secondary PBS member television station in Washington, D.C. The station is owned by Howard University, a historically Black college, and is sister to commercial urban contemporary radio station WHUR-FM 96.3. WHUT-TV's studios are located at the Student Resource Center (Campus Building 54) on the Howard University campus on 4th Street NW, and its transmitter is located in the Tenleytown neighborhood in the northwest quadrant of Washington.

WHUT airs a variety of standard PBS programming, as well as programs produced by Howard University, and international programs focusing on regions such as the Caribbean and Africa.

== History ==
On June 25, 1974, Howard University was granted a construction permit to build a new television station on channel 32 in Washington, D.C. It was more than six years before the station signed on November 17, 1980. WHMM-TV (whose call letters stood for Howard University Mass Media) turned Howard, owner of the only radio station–WHUR-FM 96.3–owned by an HBCU at the time, into the owner of the first Black-owned public television station. At the outset, the station suffered from some problems with its antenna and the need to train staff on the job. It also faced issues carving out an identity for itself and its mission, with standard PBS fare airing during much of the day; in 1983, its budget was one-third that of WETA-TV. However, within its first decade, it produced 1,000 Howard graduates trained in television production. The long-running Evening Exchange public affairs program, which debuted with the station, became a station staple; it was hosted by Kojo Nnamdi between 1985 and 2011.

Budget cuts at Howard in the late 1980s and 1990s prompted staff cuts in operations. Even as the station tried to significantly step up fundraising, its treatment as another academic department, requiring a different style of management, often hurt WHMM-TV. Staff levels were cut from 90 in 1988 to 65 five years later, when a blue-ribbon panel was convened by PBS to discuss the station's problems; that year, it had to suspend production of Evening Exchange for four months because it had lost revenue from the rights to produce D.C. Lottery drawings. In 1996, the station stopped running pledge drives when they became too expensive for the funds they raised—and would not try again until eight years later.

The call letters were changed to WHUT-TV in 1998 to increase channel 32's identification with the university. At the time it had signed on, the WHUT call letters belonged to a radio station in Anderson, Indiana and were not available to Howard.

Soon after the start of preparations for the 2016-17 spectrum reallocation auction, Howard University announced that it was considering the sale of WHUT-TV's channel 33 allocation in the auction to alleviate longstanding financial issues at the university. The station was entered into the auction when it began in March 2016. Because of WHUT-TV's status as the only Black-owned public television station in the United States, the decision attracted sustained opposition from faculty and community members who feared the loss of a rare minority voice in public media. Howard announced WHUT-TV was withdrawn from the auction on February 16, 2017; the official reason was that the station's asking price had become low enough through the reverse auction process that it was apparent selling would not produce sufficient proceeds to justify ending operations.

== Technical information ==
=== Subchannels ===
The station's ATSC 1.0 channels are carried on the multiplexed signal of WJLA-TV:

Subchannels provided by WHUT-TV (ATSC 1.0) on the WJLA-TV multiplex
Subchannel	Res.	Short name	Programming	ATSC 1.0 host
32.1	1080i	WHUT	PBS	WJLA-TV
32.2	480i	PBSKids	PBS Kids	WJLA-TV

WHUT began broadcasting in digital in 2007. In July 2009, Washington, D.C. TV stations became a test market for Mobile DTV, and WHUT was one of the participating stations.

=== Analog-to-digital conversion ===
WHUT-TV shut down its analog signal, over UHF channel 32, on June 12, 2009, the official date on which full-power television stations in the United States transitioned from analog to digital broadcasts under federal mandate. The station's digital signal continued to broadcast on its pre-transition UHF channel 33, using virtual channel 32.

WHUT-TV commenced ATSC-M/H (Mobile DTV) broadcasting on February 27, 2011. WHUT-TV was the last remaining Washington-market broadcaster to broadcast an M/H signal. The signal nominally contained a feed of its main programming in standard definition on 32.1 and an audio feed of WAMU on 32.2, although neither stream contains audio or video data.

=== ATSC 3.0 lighthouse service ===
Subchannels of WHUT-TV
Subchannel	Res.	Short name	Programming
4.1	1080p	WRC	NBC (WRC-TV)
5.1	1080p	WTTG	Fox (WTTG)
7.1	720p	WJLA	ABC (WJLA-TV)
7.10	1080p	T2	T2
7.11		PBTV	Pickleballtv
9.1	1080p	WUSA	CBS (WUSA)
32.1	1080p	WHUT	PBS

Subchannel broadcast with digital rights management
Subchannel streamed via the Internet

WHUT became the Washington market's second ATSC 3.0 lighthouse station on December 15, 2021, joining Sinclair Broadcast Group's WIAV-CD (channel 58). WHUT's ATSC 3.0 signal carries its own main programming feed as well as those of Washington's four major network affiliates. As required by FCC rules, WHUT's two subchannels relocated to the signal of Sinclair's WJLA-TV (channel 7) to continue ATSC 1.0 service to existing receivers. In advance of the conversion, a more powerful transmitter was installed. The ATSC 3.0 facility will also be used in distance learning datacasting applications involving the university's own Howard University Middle School of Math and Science.
