= WHUT =

WHUT may refer to:

- WHUT-TV, a Washington, D.C. TV station owned and operated by Howard University.
- Wuhan University of Technology, in the People's Republic of China
