= Frankie Crocker =

American disc jockey (1937–2000)

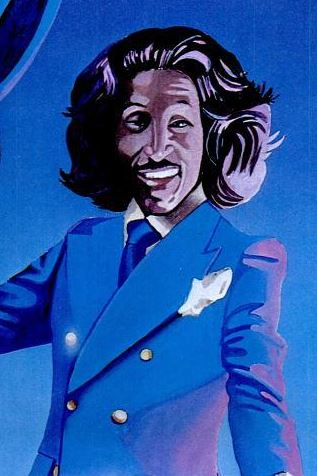
- Portrait in 1975 advertisement for Disco Rock from New York
- Born: December 18, 1937; Buffalo, New York, U.S.
- Died: October 21, 2000 (aged 62); North Miami Beach, Florida, U.S.
- Occupation: Disc jockey
- Years active: 1958–2000

Frankie "Hollywood" Crocker (December 18, 1937 – October 21, 2000) was an American disc jockey, VH-1 VJ, TV host and actor. Crocker helped grow WBLS, the urban adult contemporary and black music radio station, into the #1 station in New York City in the late 1970s.

== Radio career ==
=== Radio in Buffalo and New York City ===
According to popeducation.org, Crocker began his career in Buffalo at soul music powerhouse WUFO 1080 AM (also the home to future greats Gerry Bledsoe, Eddie O'Jay, Herb Hamlett, Gary Byrd and Chucky T). Crocker later moved to Manhattan, where he first worked for soul station 1600 WWRL and later Top 40 outlet 570 WMCA in 1969.

He then worked for 107.5 WBLS as program director and afternoon host. He took the station to the top of the ratings during the late 1970s and pioneered the radio format now known as urban contemporary. He sometimes called himself the Chief Rocker, and he was as well known for his boastful on-air patter as for his off-air flamboyance.

=== "Moody's Mood for Love" ===
When Studio 54 was at the height of its popularity, Crocker once rode in through the front entrance on a white stallion. In the studio, before he left for the day, Crocker would light a candle and invite female listeners to enjoy a candlelight bath with him. He signed off the air each night to the tune "Moody's Mood For Love" by crooner King Pleasure. Crocker coined the radio term "urban contemporary" in the 1970s, a label for the eclectic mix of songs that appealed to an urban audience of black listeners, Hispanics, whites and Asians.

He'd been the program director at WWRL and felt held back by what he considered to be the narrow perspective of the station. He quit and was twice re-hired by the station management. "He knew how to attract attention," said the chairman of Inner City Broadcasting, Hal Jackson. Inner City was the owner of WBLS and Jackson once said, "We called him Hollywood."

=== Radio programs ===
Crocker had set out on an innovative endeavor known as 'Hollywood Live', which marked the beginning of a live radio show. This show harnessed the power of satellite technology and also introduced a novel element: 1-800 call-in numbers. This feature enabled music enthusiasts to actively participate without paying toll rates to the phone company and engage in the show's content.

By 1979, Crocker was shuttling between the West Coast and East Coast, with programming duties at urban station 101.9 KUTE in Los Angeles. Later, Crocker helped usher in a format change at KUTE and WBLS, mixing disco music with other African-American and dance music genres. Crocker called it "Disco and More."

Crocker would rely on his expertise at "finding the music". Speaking to Radio Report magazine, an industry periodical, Crocker said, "There is nothing I won't play if I hear it and like it and feel it will go for my market".

WBLS helped break Blondie, Madonna, Shannon, D Train, The System, Colonel Abrams, Alicia Myers and supermodel Grace Jones as popular recording artists. He made, "Love is the Message" by MFSB as NYC's unofficial anthem on the radio. WBLS airplay made "Ain't No Stoppin Us Now" by McFadden and Whitehead a favorite cookout, church, wedding and graduation song. "The Magnificent Seven" by the Clash became a hot song in the Black Community.

Crocker brought Cameroon-native Manu Dibango's "Soul Makossa" to the attention of American audiences. He also gave America exposure to an obscure genre called "Reggae" and he helped make popular to American audiences a Jamaican rocker named Bob Marley. Fatback Band frontman Bill Curtis credited Crocker with breaking the group in New York.

Frankie Crocker was inducted into the Buffalo Broadcasting Hall of Fame in 2000 and the New York State Broadcasters Association Hall of Fame in 2005. In 2025, Crocker was selected for induction into the National Rhythm and Blues Hall of Fame.

== TV and film career ==
Crocker was one of the five original VJs on VH-1, the cable music video channel. He hosted the syndicated TV series Solid Gold. On NBC, he hosted the late-night music show Friday Night Videos. Crocker was the master of ceremonies (MC) at shows in the Apollo Theater in Harlem. The Apollo is considered the premiere theater for African-American music.

As an actor, Crocker appeared in five films, including Cleopatra Jones (1973), Five on the Black Hand Side (1973), and Darktown Strutters (Get Down and Boogie) (1975).

== Controversies ==
=== Payola accusations ===
Crocker was indicted as a result of a 1976 payola investigation. Under the cloud of charges, the radio station fired him. Crocker moved to L.A. and returned to school, while the case was investigated. The charges were later dismissed.

After the payola charges were dropped, he returned to New York radio in 1979 as DJ and Program Director on WBLS-FM, at the end of the disco era. Crocker's career in radio ended by 1985. He moved to MTV Networks as a VJ on VH-1.

=== Relationships ===
He was charged in 1983 with hitting Penthouse Pet Carmela Pope. The charges were later dropped. He also was mentioned as a paramour of, and suspect in the February 12, 1977 murder of young Hollywood starlet Christa Helm.

== Death ==
In October 2000, Crocker checked into a Miami-area hospital for several weeks. He was diagnosed with pancreatic cancer. But he kept the illness a secret from his friends and even from his mother. He died on October 21, 2000. Crocker was 62.

His friend and former boss Bob Law, a onetime program director of WWRL, said of Crocker, "He encompassed all of the urban sophistication. He appreciated the culture, the whole urban experience, and he wove it together. That's missing now, even in black radio."

== Discography as a leader of The Heart & Soul Orchestra ==
- Presents The Disco Suite Symphony No. 1 In Rhythm And Excellence (1976)
- Frankie Crocker & The Heart And Soul Orchestra (1977)

== See also ==
- Imhotep Gary Byrd
- Contemporary R&B
- Sidney August Anthony Miller Jr. Producer of Hollywood Live
- Vaughn Harper
- Hal Jackson
- Melvin Lindsey
- Tommy Smalls
- WRKS-FM – Rival to WBLS
