= Gary Byrd and the GB Experience =

- Origin: United States
- Genres: Pop music
- Years active: 1980s
- Label: Motown

Gary Byrd and the GB Experience was an American male/female vocal/instrumental group.

== History ==
The group released a single, "The Crown" on 23 July 1983 written by Gary Byrd and Stevie Wonder. According to Byrd, it was the only release on Stevie Wonder's short-lived U.S.-based Wondirection record label (part of Motown Records) that celebrated African heritage in a motivational rap featuring both Byrd and Wonder. Due to lack of sufficient promotion, it only reached number 69 on the Billboard R&B chart. In the UK, it was released on the Motown label, entered the UK Singles Chart on 23 July 1983 at number 21, and rose to a high of number 6; it remained in the chart for 9 weeks. It also reached number 7 in the Swiss Hitparade, number 14 in the German GfK Entertainment charts and number 21 in the Irish Singles Chart.

The 12" version of "The Crown" ran for 10 minutes 35 seconds, making it one of the longest tracks ever to chart in the UK. It was written by Gary Byrd and Stevie Wonder, and presented a wide-ranging historical narrative of human progress (beginning with the ancient Egyptians and continuing to the present day) with an emphasis on African heritage. It featured spoken/rapped verses by Byrd, an American DJ, with one verse sung by Wonder and Crystal Blake. Byrd described the song at the time thus: "The idea is not that black, white or anyone is better, but that we all have our place. We've all made contributions - and mistakes too. Wearing the crown is reaching the top of your potential. You could be a writer or you could be a mechanic, but you can still wear the crown."

== Gary Byrd ==
Gary Byrd (born 1949, Buffalo, New York) also worked as a DJ in the UK and presented a gospel music programme on BBC Radio 1 called "Sweet Inspirations". He often played the more obscure gospel sounds from groups such as Earth, Wind and Fire of whom he was a big fan. It was broadcast on Sunday evenings (11 pm to midnight) in the early 1980s on MW and stereo FM using the BBC Radio 2 transmitters.

Prior to this, Gary Byrd released the single "Every Brother Ain't A Brother", the album The Gary Byrd Experience and the single "Soul Travelin' (Inside the G.B.E.)" on RCA, whose intro was sampled by Soul to Soul on the song "Jazzie's Groove". He also collaborated with Wonder on the songs "Black Man", "Village Ghetto Land", "Dark and Lovely" and "Misrepresented People."
