= Urban contemporary music =

Music genre

Urban contemporary music, also known as urban music, urban pop, or just simply urban, is a music radio format. The term was coined by New York radio DJ Frankie Crocker in the early to mid-1970s as a synonym for Black music. Urban contemporary radio stations feature a playlist made up entirely of Black genres such as R&B, pop rap, quiet storm, urban adult contemporary and hip-hop; Latin music such as Latin pop, Chicano R&B and Chicano rap; and Caribbean music such as reggae and soca. Urban contemporary was developed through the characteristics of genres such as R&B and soul.

Because urban music is a largely U.S. phenomenon, virtually all urban contemporary formatted radio stations in the United States are located in cities that have sizeable African-American populations, such as New York City; Washington, D.C.; Detroit; Atlanta; Miami; Chicago; Cleveland; Philadelphia; Pittsburgh; Montgomery; Memphis; St. Louis; Newark; Charleston; New Orleans; Milwaukee; Cincinnati; Dallas; Houston; Oakland; Sacramento; Los Angeles; Trenton; Columbia; Jacksonville; Flint; Baltimore; Boston; Birmingham; Indianapolis; Augusta; Richmond; Charlotte; Savannah; Hartford; and Jackson.

Urban contemporary music includes the more contemporary elements of R&B and may incorporate production elements found in urban Euro-pop, urban rock, and urban alternative.

== Summary ==
The term urban contemporary music is heavily associated with African-American music, particularly with R&B in African-American contexts. For Latin Americans, reggaeton and Latin hip-hop are considered "Latin urban" due to influence of above mentioned genres.

Urban contemporary playlists are dominated by singles by top-selling hip-hop and R&B performers. On occasion, an urban contemporary station will play classic soul songs from the 1970s and early 1980s to satisfy the earlier end of the genre.

Many urban-formatted radio stations, such as KJLH, KPRS, KMEL, KDAY, KRNB, and WVEE, play gospel music or urban contemporary gospel music on Sundays.

Mainstream urban is a branch of urban contemporary, and rhythmic contemporary is also a branch.

== History ==
=== The 1970s ===
In 1971, Frankie Crocker would combine all the elements of his background, with jazz and R&B. When Frankie Crocker was appointed as program director of the newly created WBLS in 1974, he created an eclectic music mix of R&B and disco redefining the R&B format as urban contemporary. In 1975, WDMT in Cleveland began programming a mix of R&B, disco, and rap. The station featured live street jocks mixing vinyl records each night. The station's popularity grew and in 1980, it was Arbitron rated No. 2 12+, just behind the No. 1 rated WMMS with the original "Morning Zoo".

=== The 1980s ===
In 1983, WBLS in New York City was the first station to air a rap radio show, "Rap Attack" with Mr. Magic and Marley Marl. Freddie Jackson and Luther Vandross were popular in urban contemporary music scene. In the late 1980s, Luther Vandross, Freddy Jackson, and Whitney Houston were popular in this genre.

During the early 1980s as newly formed WRKS-FM (98.7 Kiss FM) became the first rap station in the United States, WBLS quickly began adding more rap songs to its playlists. The urban format by this time was redefined by an eclectic mix of R&B, rap, reggae, dance, house, and freestyle. WBLS continued as the flagship station of the urban format; however, Kiss FM surpassed them in the ratings.

Another successful early urban outlet was WDRQ in Detroit, which switched from a top 40 format in the spring of 1982 and made a #2 showing 12+ in its first Arbitron ratings book. In addition to rap, R&B and dance music, WDRQ featured mainstream pop music with a danceable beat from artists.

Many radio stations imitated the urban sound since it was proven to be more profitable than other formats and had proven itself more adept than straightforward black-targeted R&B formats at attracting white and Latino listeners.

Late in the decade, WVAZ Chicago and WALR Atlanta became some of the first adult R&B stations, playing artists that appealed to adults rather than rap or other styles that young people enjoyed.

Another subformat of urban contemporary is rhythmic contemporary hits. Stations playing rhythmic contemporary hits plays a great deal of dance music; however, hip-hop has become increasingly popular in the format in recent years. WQHT-FM (Hot 97) and KPWR (Power 106) were the first stations to utilize this format.

=== 1990s–present ===
Since the 1990s, as urban contemporary hits have dominated the US pop charts, many top 40 stations have turned to playing tracks popular on urban contemporary radio stations.

Following periods of fluctuating success, urban music attained commercial dominance during the early 2000s, which featured massive crossover success on the Billboard charts by R&B and hip-hop artists. In 2004, all 12 songs that topped the Billboard Hot 100 were African-American recording artists and accounted for 80% of the number-one R&B hits that year. Along with Usher's streak of singles, top 40 radio and both pop and R&B charts were topped by OutKast's "Hey Ya!", Snoop Dogg's "Drop It Like It's Hot", Terror Squad's "Lean Back" and Ciara's "Goodies". Chris Molanphy of The Village Voice later remarked that by the early 2000s, urban music was pop music.

In late-mid of the decade, KRNB Dallas signed on as an R&B and classic soul station.

By the late 2000s, urban music had taken a backseat on top 40 radio to mainstream EDM sounds, and several successful urban artists, including Rihanna, Chris Brown, Ciara, Usher, Nicole Scherzinger, Akon, Trey Songz, Pitbull, Flo Rida, and Ne-Yo, were making EDM records for top 40 airplay while continuing to make hip-hop or pure R&B records for urban airplay. Pure urban formats continue to be successful in markets with large African-American populations, while medium or smaller markets are more likely to feature urban music through the subset of rhythmic contemporary stations with danceable mainstream hits mixed in.

The Grammy Award for Best Rap/Sung Collaboration has been awarded since 2002.

== Name controversy ==
In 2020, members of the music industry voiced disagreement over the use of the term urban in describing music genres and formats, especially among African-American artists who see the term as a "catchall for music created by black artists, regardless of genre". Contributing to the debate, Lance Venta of radio industry publication RadioInsight claimed that the term urban was outdated in that hip-hop and R&B music had gained massive popularity outside the inner cities and the descriptor should not serve as a euphemism for "black music". He recommended substituting the terms hip-hop for the urban contemporary format and adult R&B for urban adult contemporary. Tyler, the Creator also spoke out, stating "[i]t sucks that whenever we – and I mean guys that look like me – do anything that's genre-bending or that's anything, they always put it in a rap or urban category", adding that "I don't like that 'urban' word – it's just a politically correct way to say the n-word to me".

Myron Fears, operations manager and program director of the black owned Carter Broadcast Group in Kansas City, defended the use of the urban tag. Responding to Republic's elimination of the term, he expressed concern that the action diminishes the status of black music executives within record companies and the industry as a whole:

I do not think it's a great idea because it nullifies all the hard work that past African American music executives built. This potentially leads to the dissolving of people and positions within the Urban music division. Hip Hop and R&B is leading the way for the surge in music sales and usage of streaming. Are the other positions, titles and departments within a record company going to change or dissolve? ... Do they realize the cultural power of Urban Music?

— Myron Fears, Carter Broadcast Group operations manager/program director

In the wake of the murder of George Floyd and the subsequent protests, a number of institutions dropped the term urban in favor of other terms. In June 2020, Republic Records and artist management company Milk & Honey stated that they would drop the use of the word in relation to music of a black origin. That same month, the National Academy for Recording Arts and Sciences renamed and redefined the Grammy Award for Best Urban Contemporary Album with Best Progressive R&B Album, "to appropriately categorize and describe this subgenre. This change includes a more accurate definition to describe the merit or characteristics of music compositions or performances themselves within the genre of R&B". They also renamed the Best Latin Pop or Urban Album to Best Latin Pop Album, while changing the name of the Latin Rock, Urban or Alternative Album to Best Latin Rock or Alternative Album.

== See also ==
- Urban adult contemporary
