= Cheerful Little Earful =

1930 song

"Cheerful Little Earful" is a 1930 song composed by Harry Warren, with lyrics by Ira Gershwin and Billy Rose. It was written for the musical Sweet and Low (1930). Actress and singer Fanny Brice, who was married to Billy Rose at the time, starred in Sweet and Low, where she and George Jessel sang the song. The actress Hannah Williams was known in particular for the song, "Cheerful Little Earful" in which she also performed in the Broadway production of Sweet and Low.

As the last line of each stanza notes, the "cheerful little earful" is "the well known 'I love you.'"

The piece became popular outside of the show and was recorded in several forms.

== Notable recordings ==
- Tom Gerun & His Orchestra - a Brunswick recording (catalog 4971) which was popular in 1930.
- Chick Bullock - recorded on December 9, 1930, for Perfect Records (catalog No. 12675).
- Fred Rich & His Orchestra (vocal by Smith Ballew) - recorded on November 19, 1930, for Parlophone Records (catalog No. 34157).
- Seger Ellis & His Orchestra - Recorded in New York, December 15, 1930, for Columbia Records (catalog No. 2362D).
- Russ Morgan & His Orchestra - recorded for Decca Records (catalog No. 23993) on August 22, 1944.
- Ella Fitzgerald - Get Happy! (Verve, 1959).
- The Hawaiian Duces - an Angelus-Electrobeam release (catalog 3301-B) 1930.
