= WOWD-LP =

- Takoma Park, Maryland; United States
- Broadcast area: Takoma Park, Maryland; College Park, Maryland; Hyattsville, Maryland; Northeast, Washington, D.C. Northwest, Washington, D.C.
- Frequency: 94.3 MHz
- Branding: Takoma Radio

Programming
- Format: Variety

Ownership
- Owner: Historic Takoma, Inc.

History
- First air date: July 16, 2016

Technical information
- Licensing authority: FCC
- Facility ID: 195180
- Class: L1
- ERP: 20 watts
- HAAT: 67 meters (220 ft)
- Transmitter coordinates: 38°58′28.40″N 77°0′38.10″W

Links
- Public license information: LMS
- Website: WOWD-LP Online

WOWD-LP ("wow-dee") is a Variety formatted broadcast radio station licensed to Takoma Park, Maryland, serving a potential terrestrial audience of 250,000 listeners in Takoma Park, College Park and Hyattsville in Maryland, along with parts of Northeast and Northwest Washington, D.C. WOWD-LP is owned and operated by Historic Takoma, Inc.

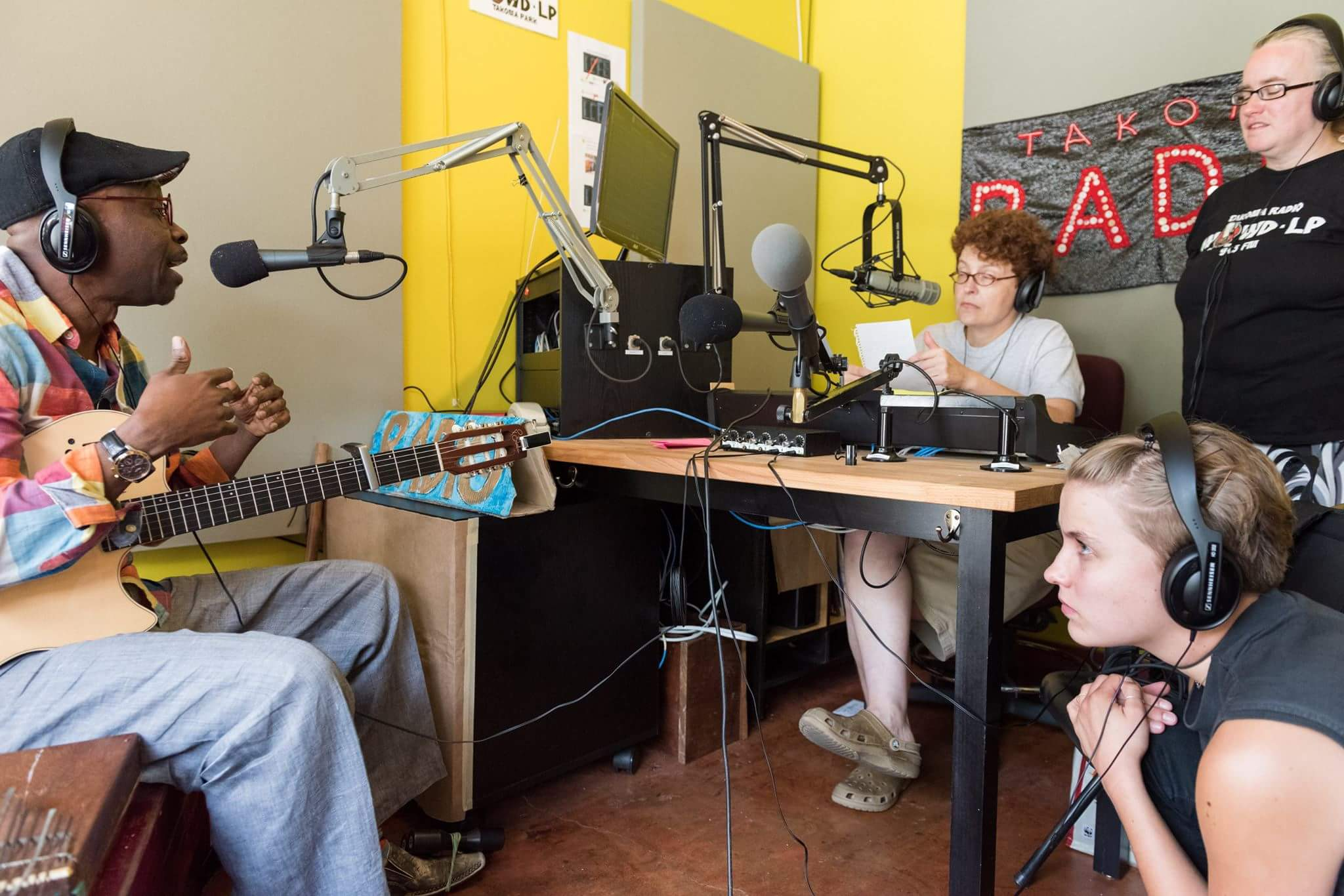
Musician Jaja Bashengezi in the Takoma Radio studio on July 16, 2016, the day the station first went on the air

== History ==
After applying for an LPFM license in November 2013, Takoma Radio was awarded the license for 94.3 fm by the FCC in January 2015. The effort was led by a group of local volunteers, organized by Takoma Park resident and broadcast veteran Marika Partridge. "Good morning, world, this is Takoma Radio," said Partridge, the first words broadcast from the station at 9:43am on July 16, 2016 from a volunteer-built studio in the heart of historic Takoma Park.

On June 1, 2024 Bob Boilen took over as program director.

== Programming ==
Takoma Radio features a variety of music and talk programming and features shows such as Afropop Worldwide, broadcasters such as literary scholar Carolivia Herron and host of NPR's All Songs Considered Bob Boilen, and specials such as vintage jazz expert Rob Bamberger and live performances from local musicians.

== See also ==
- List of community radio stations in the United States
