= Hannah Williams (actress) =

American actress and singer (1911–1973)

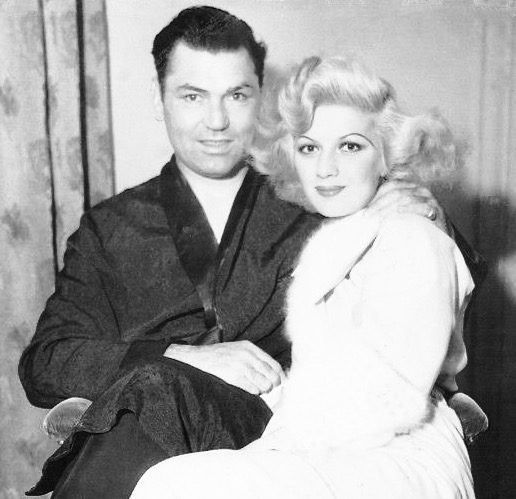
- Hannah Williams with her husband Jack Dempsey after their marriage in 1933
- Born: July 16, 1911; Taylor, Pennsylvania, U.S.
- Died: January 11, 1973 (aged 61); Los Angeles, California, U.S.
- Occupations: Stage actress, film actress, singer, comedian
- Spouses: Charles Kaley (m. 1927; ann. 1927); Roger Wolfe Kahn (m. 1931; div. 1933); Jack Dempsey (m. 1933; div. 1943); Thomas J. Monaghan (m. 1950; div. 1951)
- Children: 2

Hannah Williams (July 16, 1911 – January 11, 1973) was an American actress, singer, and comedian and former wife of bandleader Roger Wolfe Kahn and Hall of Fame boxer Jack Dempsey.

== Life and career ==
Hannah Williams was born in Taylor, Pennsylvania, and performed as a young child with her older sister Dorothy as "The Williams Sisters", a singing and dancing vaudeville act. Hannah was aged eight and her sister Dorothy aged ten when they commenced their stage careers. The sisters performed with the Scranton Sirens Orchestra (1923), and achieved early fame on Broadway, New York, when they performed in George White's Scandals of 1924. In Chicago, they performed with the Charley Straight Orchestra in (1925), and with the Ben Pollack Orchestra from 1926 to 1927, and in various Chicago and New York nightclubs and theaters. They were known as the hippest sister act in vaudeville and cabaret.

During the 1920s the Williams Sisters recorded with various orchestras including Ben Pollack's band. In Chicago on December 17, 1926, the Williams Sisters recorded the vocals on "He's The Last Word" with Ben Pollack and his Californians starring Benny Goodman. The following day, also in Chicago with Ben Pollack and his Californians, the Williams Sisters recorded "Nothing Else Matters Anymore" and "Sam, The Old Accordion Man" with a piano accompaniment by Wayne Allen. The tracks were released by Victor Records (No. 20452).

In 1930, Hannah achieved featured billing, along with Fanny Brice and George Jessel in the Broadway musical revue Sweet and Low in which she sang the hit tune "Cheerful Little Earful", which in later years became the song most associated with her. She quit the show in 1931 to marry Roger Wolfe Kahn.

Her only known film appearance was singing "Get Happy" in the short film The Audition (1933), one of the Warner Brothers series of "Melody Masters" musical shorts. In 1933, Hannah and her new husband Jack Dempsey appeared together in a featured Pathé newsreel.

In 1935, Hannah's husband Jack Dempsey opened his famous Broadway restaurant and bar Jack Dempsey's Broadway Restaurant, which became an institution.

In 1937, Hannah was cast in the Harold Arlen and E. Y. Harburg musical Hooray for What! and performed in the Boston and Philadelphia tryouts, but was replaced before the show opened on Broadway by actress June Clyde.

In 1940, Hannah planned to reignite her stage career. Reports appeared in the press acknowledging her comeback. She also confirmed she would not be using her husband's surname on stage and would go under her maiden name Williams. Although she went into rehearsals, her planned comeback was temporarily halted, due to her marriage commitments. Her return to the stage did finally take place three years later, in 1943 upon her divorce from Dempsey. She opened in vaudeville and made various nightclub appearances, including at New York's chic Riobamba.

In 1947, Hannah recorded with the bandleader Tommy Dorsey and his Clambake Seven, laying down the vocals on "But I Do Mind If Ya Don't" and "That's Life; I Guess". The songs were released by RCA Victor Records (release No. 20-2320).

== Family and marriages ==
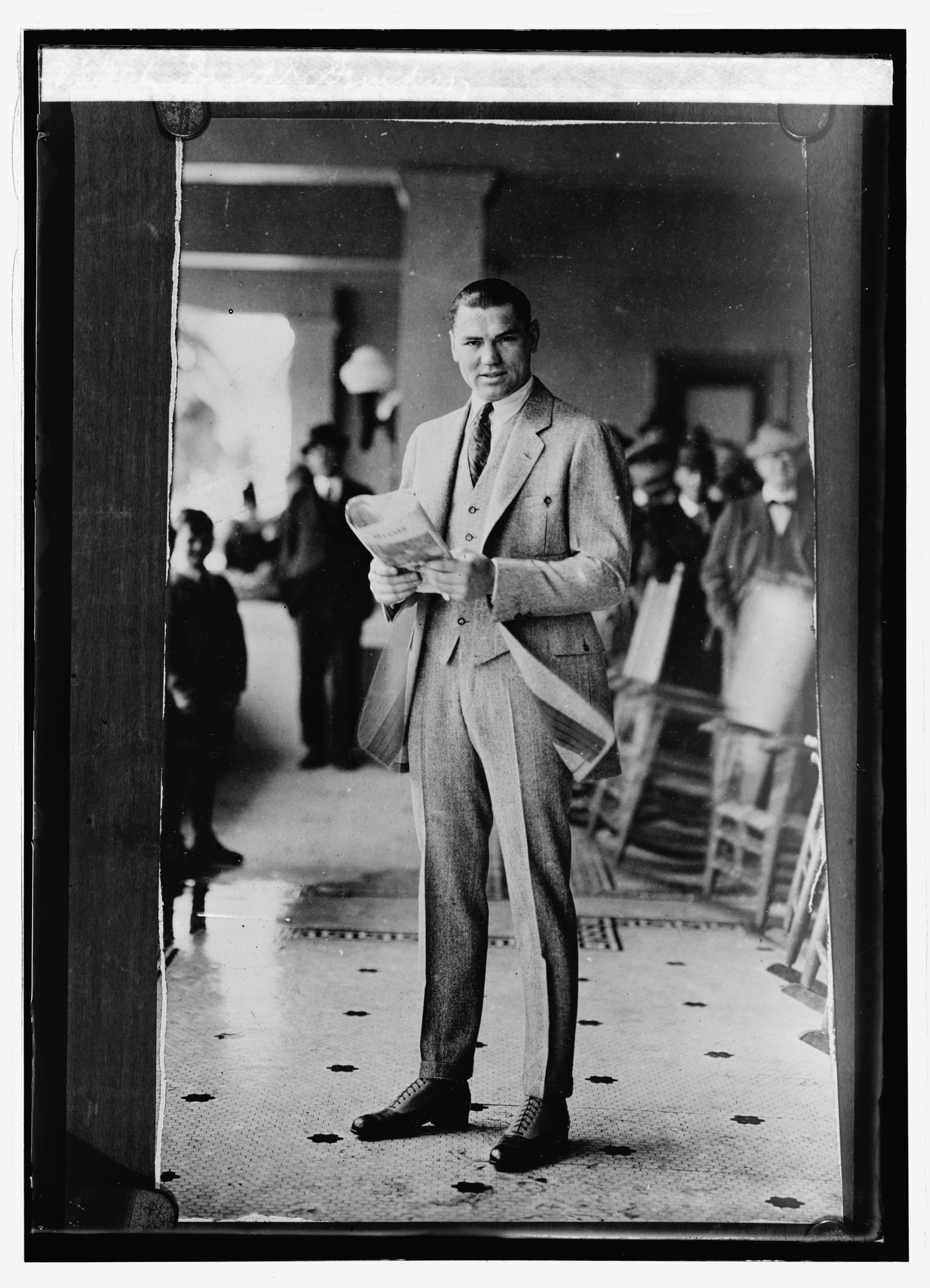
Hannah's third husband was the heavyweight boxing champion Jack Dempsey.

Hannah first married the bandleader and future movie actor Charles Kaley. The marriage was terminated due to her being underage. She then married bandleader Roger Wolfe Kahn from 1931 through 1933. Hannah went on to have a brief relationship with actor and crooner Russ Colombo, who died soon after in a shooting accident. A series of love-letters from Hannah written to Colombo exist and are mentioned in the book Let Me Tell You How I Really Feel: The Uncensored Book Reviews of Classic Images by Laura Wagner. Hannah was married to eight-year heavyweight champion boxer Jack Dempsey from 1933 to 1943, with whom she had two children, Joan (1934) and Barbara (1936). Rare film footage of Hannah and Jack filmed by British Pathé Newsreel in 1933 just after they were married is housed at the British Pathé Historical Archive. In 1950, she married the Hollywood movie actor and comedian Thomas J. Monaghan, only to file for divorce the next year. Her sister Dorothy was married to Dixieland cornet player Jimmy McPartland who was occasionally hired by Roger Wolfe Kahn.

== Sources ==
- Williams Sisters Discography: Moanin' Low: A Discography of Female Popular Vocal Recordings, 1920–1933, by Ross Laird.
