= Bob Boilen =

American musician and media personality

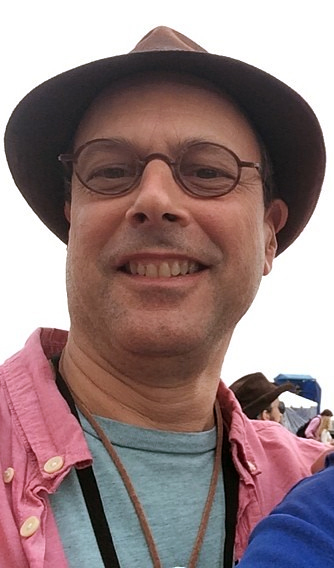
- Bob Boilen (2014)
- Born: April 10, 1953 (age 73); Brooklyn, New York City, New York
- Presenting career
- Show: My Tiny Morning Show (2021 – present)
- Station: WOWD-LP
- Style: Presenter
- Country: United States
- Previous shows: All Songs Considered (NPR, 2000 – 2023)
- Website: bobboilen.info

Bob B Boilen (born April 10, 1953, in Brooklyn, New York City) is an American musician and media personality. He was the host and creator of NPR's online music show All Songs Considered and the co-creator of NPR's Tiny Desk Concerts, a series originally conceived of by NPR's Stephen Thompson. He retired from NPR in October 2023 after 35 years.

Since 2021, Boilen has hosted the weekly show My Tiny Morning Show on WOWD-LP.

== Career ==
In 1978, Bob Boilen played synthesizers in the Washington, D.C. band Tiny Desk Unit. They were the first band to ever play the 9:30 Club at the original location at 930 'F' Street. From 1982 to 1986, Boilen filled a variety of roles including composer with Baltimore's Impossible Theater. He also worked as a producer for Channel 50, and produced Science Live for the Discovery Channel. He joined NPR in 1988 and "was hired to work on the flagship news program All Things Considered on a temporary basis. Less than a year later, he became the director of the show". He held that position until 2007. As director, Boilen chose the music between the news stories for that show. Those musical snippets, or "buttons", were the starting point for the creation of the show All Songs Considered in 2000. He then helped create NPR Music in 2007.

Boilen co-created and produced the Tiny Desk Concert series in April 2008 for NPR Music, hosting intimate performances at his desk. The series, curated by Boilen and the team of NPR Music, was inspired by a comment made by NPR Music's Stephen Thompson when he jokingly invited musician Laura Gibson to perform at Bob's desk. The two of them went to see Gibson at a show at South by Southwest in 2008 and the loud crowd made it impossible to hear her. The series is named after the band Boilen played in from 1979 to 1981, Tiny Desk Unit. He retired from NPR on October 2, 2023.

Since August 2021, he has hosted a weekly morning show on WOWD-LP, a low-power FM station in Takoma Park, Maryland. In April 2024, it was announced he would become program director at the station effective June 1, 2024.

Bob Boilen continues to play music with friend Michael Barron; both were founding members of the psychedelic dance band Tiny Desk Unit (1979–1981), for which Boilen played synthesizer. Boilen continues to write music with Barron in a band called Danger Painters and also writes and releases solo music. Boilen also composed the original theme music for Talk of the Nation.

He voiced himself in "Gal of Constant Sorrow", a Season 27 episode of the animated television series The Simpsons.
