= Patrick Ellis (radio host) =

American radio show host (1943–2020)

- Born: May 30, 1943; Washington, D.C., U.S.
- Died: July 16, 2020 (aged 77); Annapolis, Maryland, U.S.
- Occupation: Radio show host
- Employer: WHUR-FM
- Notable work: "Gospel Spirit"

Patrick Connery Ellis (May 30, 1943 – July 16, 2020) was an American radio show host and production director. He hosted "Gospel Spirit" for over forty years on WHUR-FM. Upon his death, Ellis was the longest running on air personality in Washington radio history.

== Early life and education ==
Patrick Connery Ellis was born at Freedman's Hospital in Washington, D.C., on May 30, 1943. His mother, Ida Delaney Ellis, was a teacher and his father, Roy Alexander Ellis, was a government labor relations specialist. He had one brother, Roy M. Ellis. After attending public schools, Ellis attended Westminster School in Connecticut.

He was raised Episcopalian. Ellis first heard gospel music as a boy, when he walked past a church and heard "drums and tambourines and people singing and shouting." Relatives took him to see Shirley Caesar and the Caravans at the Apollo Theater, which he cited as the turning point for his love of gospel. As a child, Ellis also listened to local DC radio how DJ Lord Fauntleroy Bandy.

After graduating from Westminster, Ellis attended Howard University for communications. In 1971, he started volunteering at WHUR-FM, Howard's radio station. He became a full-time staff member at the station in 1975. In 1977, he earned his bachelor's degree from Howard.

== Career ==
In 1979, Ellis was asked by program director Jesse Fax to host a gospel show. He started hosting "Sunday Morning Gospel", a four-hour gospel music show every Sunday morning. To learn more about gospel, he visited local religious record stores and bookstores, eavesdropping on customers talking about music.

He provided what he called a "spiritual transfusion during the week" for churchgoers. During the show, Ellis also shared his own personal journey with faith and shared announcements from local nonprofits and churches. He also hosted fundraisers, including fundraisers to feed the hungry, domestic violence victims, and cancer patient care.

In 1986, he became production director of WHUR-FM. By 1989, the radio show, now called "Gospel Spirit," averaged 64,000 listeners weekly and was regularly ranked as the most popular show at the station. That year, an anniversary party was held with BeBe and CeCe Winans and the Barrett Sisters performing and Jesse Jackson, Del. Walter Fauntroy and Marion Barry in attendance.

In 1999, Ellis was honored with a proclamation for his work by Prince George's County, Maryland.

In June 2020, Ellis finished building his at-home studio in Annapolis. He hosted his last shows of "Gospel Spirit" at his home studio before his death in July 2020. One of his favorite gospel songs was "Take Away" by Yolanda Adams and a revival piece by Luther Barnes.

== Personal life and death ==
Ellis was married four times. He divorced his first three wives (Maxine Lindsey, Marcia Brown and Clara Patterson). He had a daughter with Maxine Lindsey, Susan Cooper, and a second daughter, Adina Ellis Cato, with Marcia Brown. In 1999, he married Angela Green and lived in Mitchellville, Maryland.

In June 2020, Ellis was hospitalized for COVID-19 amidst the COVID-19 pandemic in Maryland. He died from complications of the virus at an Annapolis hospital on July 16, 2020, at the age of 77.
