= Hot Jazz Saturday Night =

Jazz Show on DC NPR station

Hot Jazz Saturday Night is a weekly jazz program broadcast on WAMU, a public radio station owned by American University and affiliated with National Public Radio or NPR. It has been hosted since 1980 (with a short period of suspension) by Rob Bamberger. Each Saturday, from 7 PM to 10 PM, Bamberger plays three hours of jazz, particularly from the 1920s through the 1940s, drawn from his personal collection of 78's, LP's and CD's, and provides detailed explanations of the artists whose recordings he is playing. Some programs focus on a particular jazz performer, often from a discrete period during that artist's career, or a related set of performers, while other programs spin merrily through many different artists and different eras. The program is extended to several hours every year for “A Hot Jazz New Year's Eve.”

The program has been preserved in the Library of Congress collection of significant locally produced radio programming, and has been widely praised by jazz lovers.

The program began in 1980 after Bamberger, who volunteered at WAMU, was initially hired to do a one-hour program, which ran from 7:30 PM to 8:30 PM. In June 2018, after general manager J.J. Yore decided that the station should sharpen its focus on an all-news-and-talk format, the station canceled Hot Jazz Saturday night and one other Saturday-evening music program, laying Bamberger off so that he could “look for other opportunities.” The switch occasioned huge protests and, reportedly, cost WAMU many of its public supporters. About two years later, in September 2020, after Yore left the station, new content manager Monna Kashfi invited Bamberger to return at a new time (7 PM to 10 PM), and the program's supporters responded by providing more than $100,000 in donations during the first membership drive after he returned.
