= WHUR-FM =

Urban adult contemporary radio station in Washington, D.C.

- Washington, D.C.; United States
- Broadcast area: Washington metropolitan area
- Frequency: 96.3 MHz (HD Radio)
- RDS: PI: 693d; PTY: R&B; RT: Artist-Title
- Branding: 96.3 WHUR

Programming
- Language: English
- Format: Urban adult contemporary
- Subchannels: HD2: Quiet Storm; HD3: WHBC; HD4: DC Radio
- Affiliations: Compass Media Networks; Premiere Networks; United Stations Radio Networks

Ownership
- Owner: Howard University
- Sister stations: WHUT-TV

History
- First air date: 1939 (W3XO experimental); September 1946
- Former call signs: W3XO (1939–1946); WINX-FM (1946–1949); WTOP-FM (1949–1971)
- Former frequencies: 43.2 MHz (1939–1947); 44.7 MHz (1947); 92.9 MHz (1946–1947)
- Call sign meaning: Howard University Radio

Technical information
- Facility ID: 65707
- Class: B (Non-commercial)
- ERP: 16,500 watts
- HAAT: 244 meters (801 ft)
- Transmitter coordinates: 38°57′01″N 77°04′46″W
- Translator: HD2: 98.3 W252DC (Reston, Virginia)

Links
- Webcast: Listen live; HD2: Listen live; HD3: Listen live; HD4: Listen live
- Website: whur.com; HD2: www.thequietstormstation.com; HD3: www.whbc963hd3.com; HD4: dcradio.gov

WHUR-FM (96.3 MHz) is an urban adult contemporary commercial FM radio station that is licensed to Washington, D.C., and serving the Washington metropolitan area. It is owned and operated by Howard University, making it one of the few commercial radio stations in the United States to be owned by a college or university, as well as being the only independent, locally owned station in the Washington, D.C., area. Staff members of the station mentor the students of the university's school of communications. The studios are located inside building number 49 (the C. B. Powell Building) on campus in its Lower Quad portion on Bryant Street NW, and the transmitter tower is based in the Tenleytown neighborhood. It is also co-owned with its television partner, WHUT-TV, one of D.C.'s PBS affiliates.

WHUR is also the home of the original Quiet Storm program, which longtime D.C. listeners have rated number one in the evening since 1976, and which spawned the namesake music genre that now airs on many radio stations across the United States. In 2005, it also began broadcasting in IBOC digital radio, using the HD Radio system from iBiquity.

== History ==
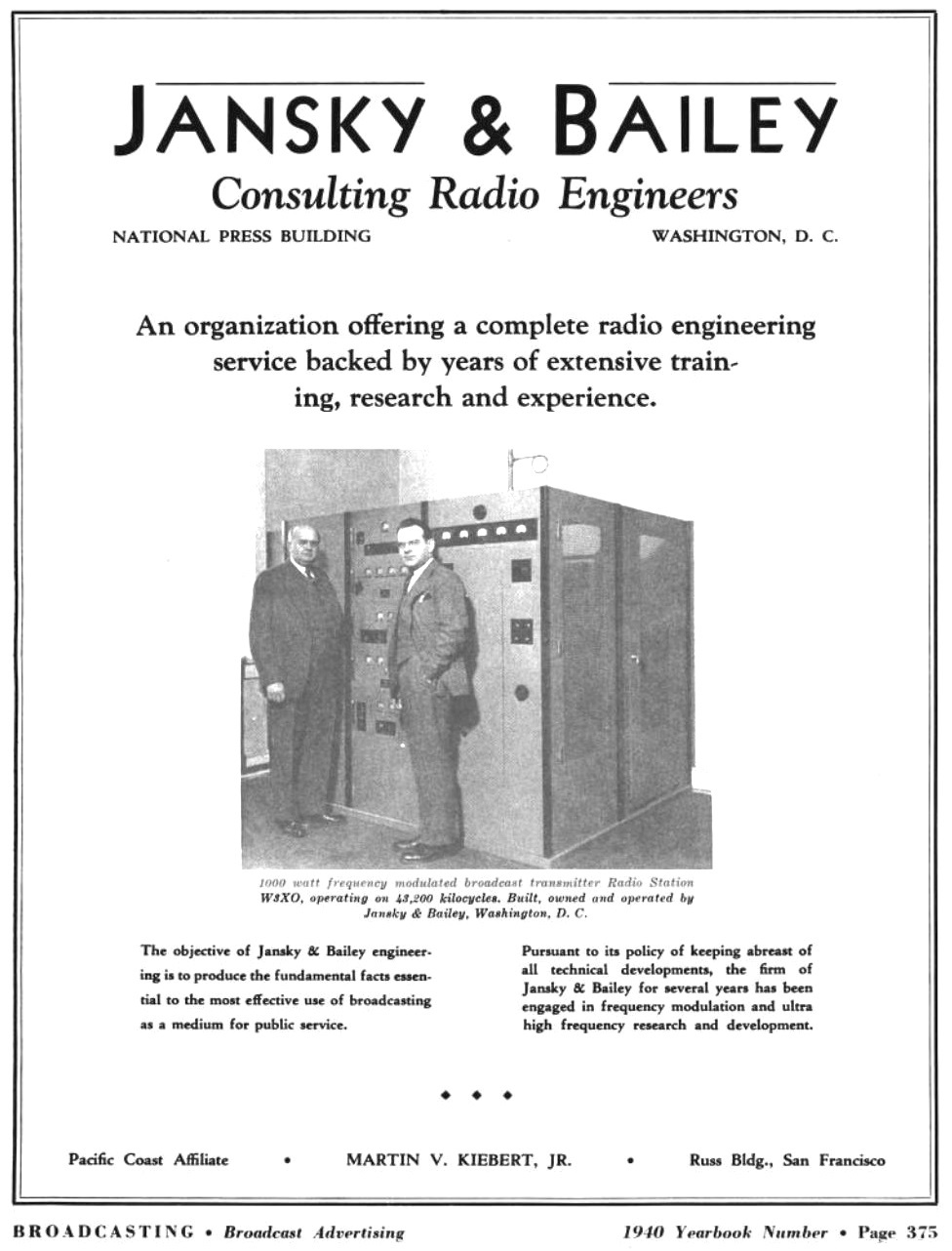
1940 Jansky & Bailey advertisement featuring the W3XO transmitter.

The station began operations in August 1939, as experimental FM station W3XO, on 43.2 MHz in the original FM band. It was founded by Jansky & Bailey, a local Washington firm headed by consulting radio engineers C. M. Jansky and Stuart Bailey. In October 1945, W3XO was sold to WINX Broadcasting Company for $75,000. This company also operated WINX (1340 AM), and was owned by the Washington Post newspaper.

In May 1940, the Federal Communications Commission (FCC) had announced the establishment, effective January 1, 1941, of an FM band operating on 40 channels spanning 42–50 MHz. However, as of 1945, there were no commercial FM stations in the Washington area, with the only local FM broadcasters consisting of two experimental authorizations: W3XO, plus Everett L. Dillard's W3XL. In November 1945, the WINX Broadcasting Company filed an application to convert W3XO into the Washington area's first commercial station. The application was granted the following August, and assigned the call letters WINX-FM.

WINX-FM started regular broadcasting in September 1946, with a daily schedule from 9:00 a.m. to 11:15 p.m., mostly duplicating the programming of WINX. The FCC was in the process of reassigning the original FM band frequencies to other services, and ordered existing stations to move to a new band from 88 to 106 MHz, which was later expanded to 88–108 MHz. During a transition period from the original FM "low band" to the new "high band", some stations broadcast simultaneously on their old and new frequencies. Thus, initially WINX-FM transmitted on both 43.2 and 92.9 MHz. In July 1946, the FCC directed that FM stations currently operating on 42-44 MHz would have to move to new frequencies by the end of the year, and the station received a temporary authorization to transmit on 44.7 MHz. In 1947, WINX-FM was reassigned to 96.3 MHz.

WINX-FM had the slogan "Sounds like Washington", to reflect the station's local ownership, which is still in use today. In 1949, the Post sold the AM station, WINX, and purchased WTOP (1500 AM). At this point WINX-FM's call letters were changed to WTOP-FM.

By 1970, WTOP-FM was playing pop music with large parts of the day spent simulcasting all-news WTOP. In December, the Post announced it would donate the station to Howard University. Howard had failed several months prior in its attempt to secure the last vacant FM allocation in the Washington market, 89.3 FM (now WPFW). University president James E. Cheek said in a statement that "we consider this a major step forward for Howard University in its determination to advance the role of black citizens toward a better America in the years ahead."

On December 6, 1971, the station changed its call letters to WHUR-FM. WHUR became a jazz-formatted radio station, which it remained until April 1993, when it switched to an urban adult contemporary format.

The quiet storm format of mellow, rhythm and blues and soul music, smooth jazz and love songs often played at night on many radio stations originated at WHUR. Then-intern Melvin Lindsey came up with the idea when he played a soothing string of songs during a particularly bad storm in 1976, even as power was cut to most other area radio stations. It is named after a Smokey Robinson album of the same name. The quiet storm nighttime format has since been replicated in other major cities that have R&B station formats, such as San Francisco-based KBLX (which formerly utilized a 24-hour quiet storm format for three decades).

In 1977, WHUR-FM reporter and student intern Maurice Williams was killed during the Hanafi siege.

By 1995, WHUR became one of the highest-rated radio stations in the market, right behind WPGC-FM. Also that year, WHUR became the Washington radio and flagship affiliate of the syndicated Tom Joyner Morning Show (TJMS). However, in 1999, ABC Radio Networks did not renew its contract with WHUR and moved the show to WMMJ, thus ending its four-year relationship with the station. WHUR was forced to produce its own locally based morning drive show. This initially affected the station's dominance over rival WMMJ. WHUR, in 2002, acquired The Michael Baisden Show and later, in 2005, The Steve Harvey Morning Show. The station regained its top two spots in the market to date, pacing number two in the 12+ demographic and number one in the 25–54 demographic and the number one urban formatted station in D.C. In 2013, The Michael Baisden Show was cancelled due to its distributor, Cumulus Media and Baisden failing to reach an agreement; WHUR has since replaced its P.M. drive with former Baltimore and Atlanta radio personality Frank Ski, former host of the morning show on WVEE in Atlanta (where Ski still resides).

In September 2016, the station was awarded "Urban Station of The Year" by the National Association of Broadcasters'.

== HD and satellite radio ==
WHUR-FM produces several ancillary programming streams, variously available over its HD Radio signal and SiriusXM satellite radio:

- WHUR-FM HD2 is "The Quiet Storm Station", a 24-hour music stream modeled after WHUR's longtime evening program.
- WHUR-FM HD3, branded as "WHBC 96.3", is a student-run mainstream urban format focused on hit-driven hip hop, soul and R&B titles.
- WHUR-FM HD4 is "DC Radio", a city-run community station with local music and community affairs.
- "HUR Voices" is an urban talk channel hosted on SiriusXM.
- "HBCU RadioNet" is a second SiriusXM channel hosting talk and music programming produced by Howard and other historically black colleges and universities.

== See also ==
- Patrick Ellis
- List of journalists killed in the United States
