= Sweet and Low (musical) =

- Music: Various
- Lyrics: Various
- Book: David Freedman
- Productions: 1930 Broadway

Sweet and Low is a musical revue produced by Billy Rose and starring James Barton, Fanny Brice, George Jessel, and Arthur Treacher. It features sketches by David Freedman and songs by various composers and lyricists.

The 1930 Broadway production was directed by Alexander Leftwich and choreographed by Danny Dare, with additional dances staged by Busby Berkeley. Scenic design was by Jo Mielziner. It ran for a week at the Majestic Theatre in Brooklyn before opening on November 17, 1930, at Chanin's 46th Street Theatre, where it ran for 184 performances. Although it rarely sold out, Rose transferred it to the 44th Street Theatre, where it was more successful at the box office.

== Song list ==
Act 1

- Overture (Music by Harry Archer and Oscar Levant; Lyrics by Edward Eliscu)
- Mr. Jessel (Music and lyrics by Charlotte Kent)
- Cheerful Little Earful (Music by Harry Warren; Lyrics by Ira Gershwin and Billy Rose) sung by Hannah Williams.
- In a Venetian Box (Music by Vivian Ellis)
- When a Pansy Was a Flower (Music by William C. K. Irwin; Lyrics by Billy Rose and Malcolm McComb)
- Revival Days (Music by William C. K. Irwin; Lyrics by Malcolm McComb)
- Overnight (Music by Louis Alter; Lyrics by Billy Rose and Charlotte Kent)
- Gimme Me Watch and Chain (Music and lyrics by George M. Cohan)

Act 2

- I Knew Him Before He Was Spanish (Music by Dana Suesse; Lyrics by Billy Rose and Ballard MacDonald)
- You Sweet So and So (Music by Phil Charig and Joseph Meyer; Lyrics by Ira Gershwin)
