= Quiet storm =

Radio format and genre of R&B

- Stylistic origins: R&B; smooth soul; smooth jazz; jazz fusion; pop; soft rock; easy listening
- Cultural origins: Mid-1970s, United States

Other topics
- List of quiet storm songs

Quiet storm is a radio format and genre of R&B, performed in a smooth, romantic, jazz-influenced style. It was named after the title track of Smokey Robinson's 1975 album A Quiet Storm.

The radio format was pioneered in 1976 by Melvin Lindsey, while he was a student intern at the Washington, D.C. radio station WHUR-FM operated by Howard University. The format eventually became regarded as an identifiable subgenre of R&B. Quiet storm was marketed primarily to upscale mature African-American audiences. It peaked in popularity during the 1980s, but fell out of favor with young listeners in the golden age of hip hop.

== History ==
=== Origins ===
Melvin Lindsey, a student at Howard University, with his classmate Jack Shuler, began as disc jockeys for WHUR-FM in June 1976, performing as stand-ins for an absentee employee. Lindsey's on-air voice was silky smooth, and the music selections were initially old, slow romantic songs from black artists of the 1950s, 1960s, and 1970s, a form of easy listening which Lindsey called "beautiful black music" for African Americans. The response from listeners was positive, and WHUR station manager Cathy Hughes soon gave Lindsey and Shuler their own show. The name of the show came from the Smokey Robinson song "Quiet Storm", from his 1975 album A Quiet Storm.

The song developed into Lindsey's theme music which introduced his time slot every night. "The Quiet Storm" was four hours of melodically soulful music that provided an intimate, laid-back mood for late-night listening, and that was the key to its tremendous appeal among adult audiences. The format was an immediate success, becoming so popular that within a few years, virtually every station in the U.S. with a core black, urban listenership adopted a similar format for its graveyard slot.

Philadelphia's WDAS-FM had begun a similar format in 1972, where Tony Brown hosted "The Extrasensory Connection." That program was renamed to "The Quiet Storm" in 1976, and is still on the air.

In the San Francisco Bay Area, KBLX-FM expanded the night-time concept into a 24-hour quiet storm format in 1979. In the New York tri-state late night market, Vaughn Harper deejayed the quiet storm graveyard program for WBLS-FM which he developed with co-host Champaine in mid-1983. In 1993, Harper took ill and Champaine continued the program as Quiet Storm II.

Lawrence Tanter of KUTE in Greater Los Angeles replicated the KBLX format and changed his station to an all-day quiet storm format from January 1984 until September 1987, playing "a hybrid that incorporates pop, jazz, fusion, international, and urban music". Addressing the misconception that quiet storm was only for blacks, Tanter said his listenership was 40% black, 40% white, and 20% other races. WLNR-FM in Chicago also changed in August 1985 to a 24-hour quiet storm program called "The Soft Touch", featuring more instrumental music and even straight-ahead jazz, a mix which sales manager Gregory Brown described as "not so laid-back" as other quiet storm shows. A notable feature of WLNR was that the four regular deejays were women.

== Success ==
Because of the popularity of his show, Lindsey saw his annual salary increase from $12,000 in 1977 to more than $100,000 in 1985 (equivalent to $299,350 in 2025). After signing a million-dollar, five-year contract with rival Washington DC station WKYS, he left WHUR at the end of August 1985, continuing the quiet storm format on WKYS for five years starting in November with a show called "Melvin's Melodies". Part of Lindsey's original style was to mix different decades of music together, for instance playing a Sarah Vaughan ballad in between more modern numbers.

Lindsey died of AIDS in 1992 at the age of 36, but the quiet storm format he originated remains a staple in American radio programming. WHUR radio still has a quiet storm show, and many urban, black radio stations still reserve their late-night programming slots for quiet storm music. WHUR operator Howard University has registered "Quiet Storm" as a trademark for "entertainment services, namely, a continuing series of radio programs featuring music".

Hughes later built on the success of WHUR's quiet storm format to found Radio One, a broadcasting company aimed at African Americans.

== Characteristics ==
Quiet storm was most popular as a programming niche with listeners from the mid-1970s to the early 1990s. During this era, it promoted a noticeable shift in the sound of R&B of the time. Quiet storm songs were in most cases devoid of any significant political commentary and maintained a strict aesthetic and narrative distance from issues relating to black urban life. Quiet storm appropriates R&B and soul "slow jams" and recontextualizes them into rotations with their peers and predecessors.

Music journalist Jason King wrote: "Sensuous and pensive, quiet storm is seductive R&B, marked by jazz flourishes, 'smooth grooves', and tasteful lyrics about intimate subjects. As disco gave way to the 'urban contemporary' format at the outset of the 1980s, quiet storm expanded beyond radio to emerge as a broad catchall super-genre."

Ben Fong-Torres of Rolling Stone called quiet storm a "blend of pop, jazz fusion, and R&B ballads—all elegant and easy-flowing, like a flute of Veuve Clicquot champagne". Tom Ewing of Freaky Trigger describes quiet storm as "mood music – for love, but also for its failure, for wrapped flowers and too-tidy sheets. It takes some of its cues from the romantic fog of easy listening, also often balanced between seduction and rejection."

=== Gender and sexuality ===
For some, the conception of quiet storm represented a shift in the gendered and sexualized musical landscapes of R&B and soul. Music journalist Eric Harvey said that within the quiet storm genre, artists such as Luther Vandross were able to push the boundaries of gender normativity in both their sound and lyricism. Author Jason King said that through the genre and his music more generally, "Vandross toys with dominant conventions of male sexuality without engaging in androgyny or any explicit forms of traditionally feminine embodiment."

Given the sensuality and "domesticity" that the genre became recognized for, artists, particularly men, seemed to be awarded much more freedom in regards to expression of gender and sexuality, as opposed to what were viewed as more "masculine" genres. Harvey went on to say: "This is one of the most important and overlooked aspects of the Quiet Storm format, and something that Vandross did so well: embrace a male form of domestic sensuality, a musical ideal previously exclusive to women."

=== Musical escape ===
Quiet Storm emerged at a time when the US Black middle-class population was growing and the divide between the Black rich and poor was widening. "The black suburban population doubled between 1970 and 1986, and the number of blacks attending college increased 500 percent between 1960 and 1977." Quiet Storm was an escape from politics and friction; it reassured Black communities with the feeling of stability and normalcy.

== Radio ==
In the 1990s, Canadian adult contemporary station CFQR-FM in Montreal aired a Quiet Storm program featuring new-age music. At least two non-commercial FM stations, the community-based WGDR in Plainfield, Vermont, and its sister station, WGDH in Hardwick, Vermont (both owned by Goddard College), have been broadcasting a weekly, two-hour "Quiet Storm" program since 1998—a 50–50 mix of smooth jazz and soft R&B, presented in "Triple-A" (Album Adult Alternative) style, with a strong emphasis on "B" and "C" album tracks that most commercial stations often ignore.

In 2007, Premiere Radio Networks launched a nationally syndicated nightly radio program based upon the quiet storm format, known as The Keith Sweat Hotel. That program, in edited form, broadcasts under the Quiet Storm name (as The Quiet Storm with Keith Sweat) on WBLS in New York City.

== See also ==
- List of quiet storm songs
- Smooth soul
- Sophisti-pop
- Slow jam

== Bibliography ==
- King, Jason (2007). "The Sound of Velvet Melting". In Weisbard, Eric (ed.). Listen Again: A Momentary History of Pop Music. Duke University Press. p. 172. ISBN 978-0822390558.
- Ripani, Richard J. (2006). The New Blue Music: Changes in Rhythm & Blues, 1950-1999. Wm. B. Eerdmans Publishing. p. 132. ISBN 1578068614.
