= Melvin Lindsey =

American radio and television personality (1955–1992)

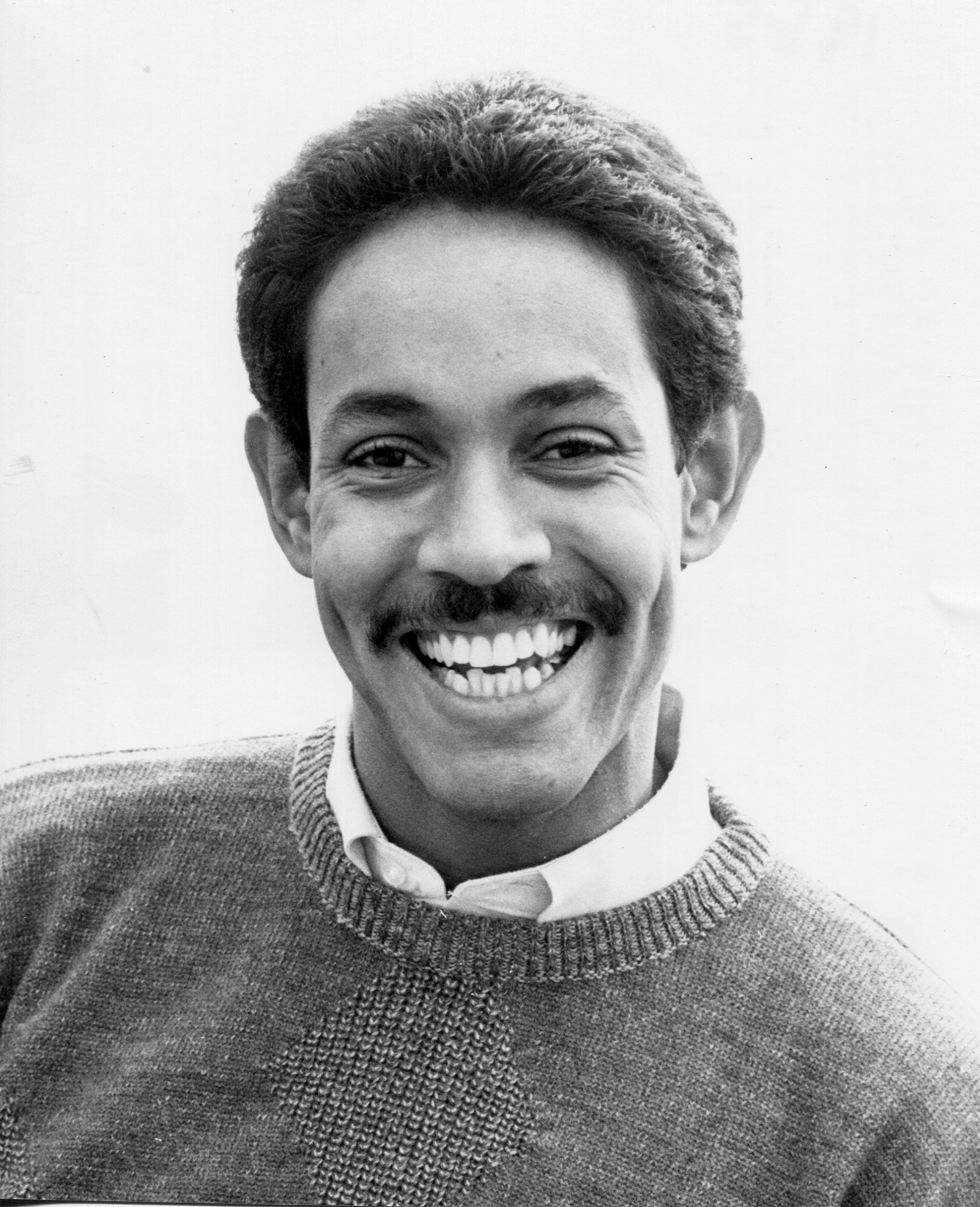
- Lindsey in 1988
- Born: July 8, 1955; Washington, D.C., U.S.
- Died: March 26, 1992 (aged 36); Washington, D.C., U.S.
- Occupations: radio and television personality
- Known for: "Quiet Storm" late-night music programming format

Melvin Lindsey (July 8, 1955 – March 26, 1992) was an American radio and television personality in the Washington, D.C. area. He is widely known for originating the "Quiet Storm" late-night music programming format.

Lindsey was a native of Washington, D.C., and attended Alice Deal Middle School and Woodrow Wilson High School. Lindsey began his broadcast career as an intern at Howard University radio station WHUR-FM. In 1976, he brought the "Quiet Storm" to the station's late-night lineup, titled after a romantic hit single by tenor crooner Smokey Robinson. The show's soulfully melodic and moody musical fare made it a phenomenal success, and the "love song"-heavy format was quickly replicated at stations across the country that served an urban, African-American adult demographic. Lindsey's show also gave rise to a category of music of the same name.

After a nine-year run on WHUR, Lindsey took his format to another local radio station, WKYS-FM, for five more years, and later he hosted Screen Scene for Black Entertainment Television (BET). He also worked for Washington, D.C. television stations WTTG-TV and WFTY-TV and for WJZ-TV in Baltimore, Maryland.

Lindsey died at the age of 36 from complications of AIDS in 1992, but the Quiet Storm format he originated gained widespread popularity. It remained popular more than four decades after its inception across the nation, especially in evening and late-night radio programs. Artists continue to compose songs to target the audiences of Quiet Storm stations and shows.

== See also ==
- Quiet storm
- A Quiet Storm – the Smokey Robinson record where the song "Quiet Storm" appeared
- Vaughn Harper
