= WAMU =

Public radio station in Washington, D.C.

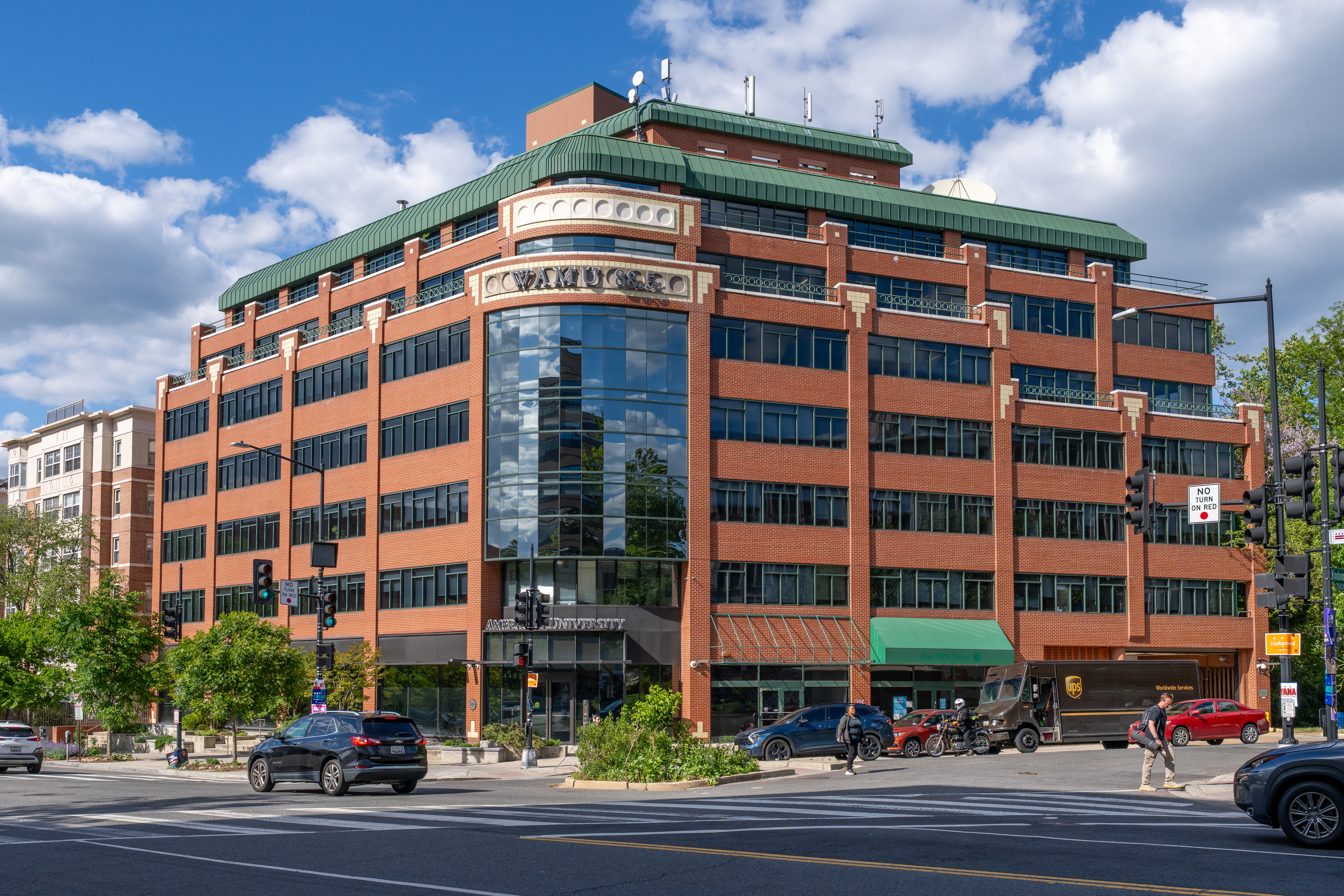
- Washington, D.C.; United States
- Broadcast area: Washington metropolitan area
- Frequency: 88.5 MHz (HD Radio)
- RDS: WAMU88.5
- Branding: WAMU 88.5

Programming
- Language: English
- Format: Public News–Talk
- Subchannels: HD2: Bluegrass Country (Bluegrass–Americana)
- Affiliations: National Public Radio

Ownership
- Owner: American University; (AU Board of Trustees)

History
- Founded: July 28, 1951; 75 years ago (carrier current)
- First air date: October 23, 1961; 65 years ago (FM)
- Former call signs: WAMU-FM (1961–1981)
- Call sign meaning: AMerican University

Technical information
- Licensing authority: FCC
- Facility ID: 65399
- Class: B
- ERP: 47,000 watts
- HAAT: 156 meters (512 ft)
- Transmitter coordinates: 38°56′10.2″N 77°5′33″W

Links
- Public license information: Public file; LMS
- Webcast: Listen live
- Website: www.wamu.org

WAMU (88.5 FM) is a public news–talk station that services the greater Washington, DC metropolitan area. It is owned by American University, and its studios are located near the campus on Connecticut Avenue Northwest in the Forest Hills (Van Ness) neighborhood of northwest Washington. WAMU has been the primary National Public Radio member station for Washington since 2007.

== History ==
WAMU began as an AM carrier-current student radio station, signing on July 28, 1951, on 1200 kHz, before shifting to 590 kHz in March 1952 and 610 kHz in November 1952. Although carrier-current stations do not hold a license or call sign from the FCC, it used "WAMU" as a familiar form of identification. The station aired a wide range of student-produced programming including music, news, sports, radio dramas, and debates. The station was heralded as a rebirth of the university's prior radio station, WAMC, which operated on 590 kHz for about two years starting on January 15, 1947, broadcasting with a 50-watt transmitter as part of a plan to offer a full range of radio and television courses at American University. WAMC's operations were sporadic and the station suffered interference from a 50,000-watt station broadcasting from Mexico on the same frequency, but it finally went off the air after station equipment was stolen in 1950.

Throughout the late 1950s, students and faculty involved with WAMU-AM pushed to create an FM station that could reach beyond campus and serve Washington, D.C., as a whole. In late 1960, the university received a non-commercial FM broadcasting license, and WAMU made its first FM broadcast on October 23, 1961, on 88.5 MHz using a 4,000-watt second-hand transmitter acquired from WGBH in Boston. Although it was not strictly necessary as the AM carrier-current station's call sign was not official, the FM station took the suffixed call sign "WAMU-FM" to differentiate itself. The station dropped the -FM suffix in 1981.

WAMU-FM station was established as an "education station" operated by the university, not as a student-run station. Despite this about 75 AU students, many of whom also worked at the carrier-current station, produced local programming for WAMU-FM. In its first year of operation, WAMU simulcast the same programming, which included educational programs, dramas, and classical music, on AM and FM for three hours each evening.

From its inception as a student-run station, WAMU provided public affairs and educational programming. With the launch of its FM service in 1961, WAMU joined the nascent National Educational Radio Network, a predecessor to NPR. In 1971, the station was a founding member of National Public Radio.

In 1967, WAMU-FM began programming bluegrass music which, in its heyday on the main channel, included the Lee Michael Demsey Show and the Ray Davis Show and weekends included Stained Glass Bluegrass and West Virginia Public Radio's Mountain Stage. The station hosted an annual bluegrass concert at Fairfax High School, as well as the yearly "Pickin' in the Glen" concert, featuring performers such as Alison Krauss, Tony Rice, the Gibson Brothers, the Lewis Family, Hot Rize, and Red Knuckles and the Trailblazers. However, starting in the late 1990s, the station began paring back its on-air bluegrass programming in favor of news/talk programming. In summer 2001, the station fully transitioned its weekday programming to all news and public affairs from various providers including NPR, PRI, APM and the BBC World Service, and in September 2007 the station removed the last of its bluegrass programming from its main channel, shifting it all to the HD2 subchannel.

On May 7, 2004, WAMU-FM began digital broadcasting using the HD Radio standard and launched the Americana-music station Bluegrass Country on its HD2 subchannel. The station also operated for several years an HD3 service, WAMU-3, broadcasting a mix of talk and music programming, including simulcast programming from Towson University's WTMD.

Also in 2004, the prominent Washington journalist Ellen Wadley Roper left WAMU a $250,000 bequest, the largest gift in the station's history.

When fellow public radio station WETA returned to an all-classical music format in 2007, WAMU became Washington, D.C.'s only full-time public news station, ending two years of competition between the stations for D.C.'s NPR news audience.

In December 2015, WAMU executives announced that long-time program host Diane Rehm, who began working at WAMU in 1973, would be stepping down from her show following the 2016 Presidential election, representing a major shake-up in WAMU's programming lineup. Rehm, then 79, stated that she wanted a younger voice to take her place at WAMU. Also in 2015, Kojo Nnamdi lost the local public affairs program The Kojo Nnamdi Show's second hour of broadcasting, showing a trend for easier-to-access media for younger consumers. In 2021, Nnamdi retired his daily program, although he continued to host the weekly "The Politics Hour" program with analyst Tom Sherwood.

In February 2018, it was announced that WAMU, KPCC and WNYC had bought the archives of Gothamist, and WAMU would resume the publication of local Washington news site DCist in Spring 2018. WAMU relaunched DCist on June 11, 2018. WAMU shut down DCist and laid off all its journalists on February 23, 2024. Initially, WAMU added a redirect from the DCist website to the WAMU homepage which blocked access to all DCist articles. However, following public criticism, WAMU restored access to the DCist website and stated they will continue to make it "available to the public for at least a year as it seeks a long-term home for the archive".

== Technical facilities ==
In 2013, WAMU moved to a new studio facility at 4401 Connecticut Ave. NW in the Forest Hills/Van Ness neighborhood of Washington, D.C. The facility was constructed with three broadcast studios, two news studios with dedicated control rooms, multiple editing suites, and a 90-seat black box theater capable of supporting broadcasts before a live studio audience. In total the five-floor WAMU media center supports 21 broadcast and production studios and control rooms and a technical core, as well as 12 conference rooms and community spaces. The IP-based studio infrastructure at the facility helped ensure WAMU staff could work remotely throughout the COVID-19 pandemic.

In October 2019, the station launched a major tower renovation and antenna replacement project for its tower on the American University campus. The improvents were designed to improve reception in Northern Virginia and parts of Maryland. During the project, WAMU broadcast from an auxiliary site in Arlington, Virginia. The WAMU antenna also serves WTOP, WPFW, and WETA; the tower also hosts auxiliary antennas for WPGC and WMMJ.

Prior to the station's move to Connecticut Avenue, WAMU operated for about two decades from two floors of an office building in Tenleytown near the AU campus that at one point housed the East German embassy. Before that, the station was housed on the AU campus next to its tower.

== Programming ==
WAMU's main channel carries content from NPR, American Public Media, Public Radio International, and Public Radio Exchange. The station's weekday schedule is largely made up of NPR staples Morning Edition, All Things Considered, Here and Now, The Takeaway, and Fresh Air. As of April 2021, WAMU produces one daily program, 1A, which NPR distributes nationally. The station also airs This American Life. A relay of the BBC World Service is heard overnight and in the 9 a.m. slot on weekdays.

WAMU breaks from its general all-news and talk schedule only on weekend nights, which it devotes to entertainment programming; Sunday nights are given to The Big Broadcast, which originated in 1964 as Recollections. This program, which airs for four hours, features rebroadcasts of drama, comedy, and variety shows from the "golden age of radio", including The Jack Benny Show, Dragnet, Gunsmoke, The Great Gildersleeve, Lux Radio Theater, and Philco Radio Time with Bing Crosby. Ed Walker, himself a storied Washington broadcaster, served as the program's host from 1990 to 2015. On Saturdays, the station broadcasts Hot Jazz Saturday Night, which features popular music from the swing era and debuted in 1980. The show, which became a Saturday night staple with a loyal audience over the years, was first cancelled in 2018. Amid listener protests, WAMU management stated at that time that music was increasingly becoming out of place on the station's schedule, and cited listener surveys showing a desire for more news programming on weekends; after this change, a delayed broadcast of Live from Here was the only remaining music program on WAMU's schedule. After the cancellation of Live From Here opened up two hours in the Saturday night schedule, WAMU returned Hot Jazz Saturday Night in September 2020.

== Bluegrass Country ==
WAMU's HD2 subchannel broadcasts bluegrass music under the branding Bluegrass Country. Bluegrass has a long history on WAMU, which included regular bluegrass programming on its main channel from 1967 to 2007. In 2001, WAMU launched Bluegrass Country as an internet stream, and in 2007 it launched Bluegrass Country on WAMU-HD2 as an all-bluegrass HD Radio digital subchannel.

In July 2016, WAMU announced it would shut down Bluegrass Country for financial reasons that December 31, unless it could find a buyer for the station and access to its HD2 channel. At the time, WAMU was losing $250,000 per year on the station. Listeners created the nonprofit Bluegrass Country Foundation, and after an extension of negotiations, the foundation took over operations in January 2017. WAMU included access to its HD2 subchannel for at least two years.

Bluegrass Country also aired on FM via independently owned translator W288BS (105.5 MHz) from Reston, Virginia, until June 2017, when the owner elected not to renew his contract with the channel and replaced it with Radio Sputnik.

Bluegrass Country Radio now airs on WAMU's HD2 subchannel and online, as well as via iOS and Android apps. Programming currently includes Stained Glass Bluegrass, the Chris Teskey Show and the Dick Spottswood Show.

== Former repeaters ==
From summer 2010 to June 2021, WAMU operated a 50,000-watt Class B Eastern Shore relay service on WRAU 88.3 MHz licensed to Ocean City, Maryland, with its transmission facilities in Whaleyville. WRAU carried local content, such as news, traffic, and weather, along with simulcasts of WAMU's main channel programming. By 2017, WRAU was considered the primary NPR news source for listeners in central Delmarva.

Citing a desire to focus on its core Washington-market, WAMU in 2020 began seeking to sell off WRAU/88.3; according to the station, WRAU makes up about 2 percent of WAMU's total weekly listenership. In February 2020, WAMU reached an agreement with Delaware Public Media for the sale of WRAU; however, the broadcasters unwound the deal in October 2020, citing economic changes due to the COVID-19 pandemic.

In March 2021, WAMU announced the sale of the station to Atlantic Gateway Communications, owner of Takoma Park, Maryland-based WGTS. WGTS plans to use WGTS as a repeater service for its contemporary Christian programming. The station handover happened on June 24, 2021, with the station being reassigned as WGBZ.

From 2014 to 2017, WAMU operated a second repeater, the 8,000-watt Class B1 WYAU on 89.5 MHz licensed to Spotsylvania Courthouse, Virginia, serving the Fredericksburg area. The station was sold in December 2017 to the Educational Media Foundation, which relaunched it as WLJV.

== WVAU ==
The student-run WAMU carrier-current station continued operating on AM and in 1979 attempted to convert to a licensed FM station. To prepare for the move, the station rebranded as WVAU, "The Voice of American University." WVAU began testing operation on 101.7 MHz in 1985, using a series of experimental low-power FM transmitters designed to limit reception to residence halls. While these plans were abandoned, it eventually started operation on cable FM, also on 101.7 and branded "Eagle 102", in 1988. WVAU shut down in 1997, resurfacing as an internet-only station in 2001.

WVAU is completely student run and is part of American University's Student Media Board. The station operates from studios in the Mary Graydon Center on the AU campus with about 100 student DJs. In 2014–15, the station produced a series of live, in-studio compilation albums, "Live in the Hive," featuring local and touring artists. In 2014, WVAU was named best student-run, internet-only station by CMJ.
