= WBLS =

Radio station in New York City

- New York, New York; United States
- Broadcast area: New York metropolitan area
- Frequency: 107.5 MHz (HD Radio)
- Branding: 107.5 FM WBLS

Programming
- Language: English
- Format: Urban adult contemporary
- Subchannels: HD2: "Luna 107.5 HD2" (Latin pop); HD3: "One Love Radio" (Caribbean music)
- Affiliations: Premiere Networks

Ownership
- Owner: MediaCo; (Mediaco WBLS License LLC)
- Sister stations: Radio: WQHT; TV: WASA-LD

History
- First air date: September 15, 1965
- Former call signs: WLIB-FM (1965–1972)

Technical information
- Licensing authority: FCC
- Facility ID: 28203
- Class: B
- ERP: 4,200 watts
- HAAT: 415 meters (1,362 ft)
- Transmitter coordinates: 40.748°N 73.986°W

Links
- Public license information: Public file; LMS
- Webcast: Listen live; HD2: Listen live
- Website: www.wbls.com

WBLS (107.5 MHz) is an urban adult contemporary formatted radio station, licensed to serve New York, New York. It is owned and operated by MediaCo Holding, along with sister station WQHT (97.1 FM). The stations share studios in the Hudson Square neighborhood of Lower Manhattan, and WBLS' transmitter is located at the Empire State Building. It was previously owned by YMF Media LLC, owned jointly by investor Ronald Burkle and Magic Johnson, which had assumed control of WBLS and WLIB's former parent company, Inner City Broadcasting Corporation, on October 19, 2012, at a purchase price of $180 million.

== History ==
=== Early years ===
The 107.5 frequency in New York City signed on in July 1951 as WEVD-FM, simulcasting its sister station at 1330 AM. Within a few years, WEVD-FM moved to 97.9, and 107.5 went off the air.

Several years later the New Broadcasting Company, then-owners of WLIB, was awarded a construction permit for the dormant frequency and on September 15, 1965, WLIB-FM signed on. As the Federal Communications Commission had recently instituted a rule prohibiting full-time AM/FM simulcasting in large markets, WLIB-FM was programmed with a Jazz format. The stations were split up in 1972, when Inner City Broadcasting purchased WLIB (AM); WLIB-FM was then renamed WBLS. Inner City reunited the pair with its purchase of WBLS in 1974.

From 1972 to 1978, WBLS was the flagship station of the Mutual Black Network (now the American Urban Radio Networks).

As part of the Inner City Broadcasting Corporation stations, program director Frankie Crocker held 5% of the radio market in the northeast from 1975 to 1978, only ceding the title of top R&B station to upstart WKTU when that station broke out playing disco and club music in 1979. By 1982 it had fallen to number 3 in the market.

In 1993, Calvin O. Butts, pastor of Abyssinian Baptist Church in Harlem, led a threat to boycott the station if they played any form of gangsta rap. Butts' protests culminated in his bulldozing a pile of hip-hop recordings during a rally. In response to the protests, WBLS excised most hip hop music from its air and carefully screened what it did play for content and language.

In 1995, after WRKS was purchased by Emmis Communications and dropped all hip-hop music in favor of a similar adult R&B format, WBLS countered with a controversial advertising campaign labeling WRKS as a "plantation station." WBLS shortly reverted to urban contemporary, only to exit again in 2004 when WBLS switched to urban adult contemporary.

=== 2010–present ===
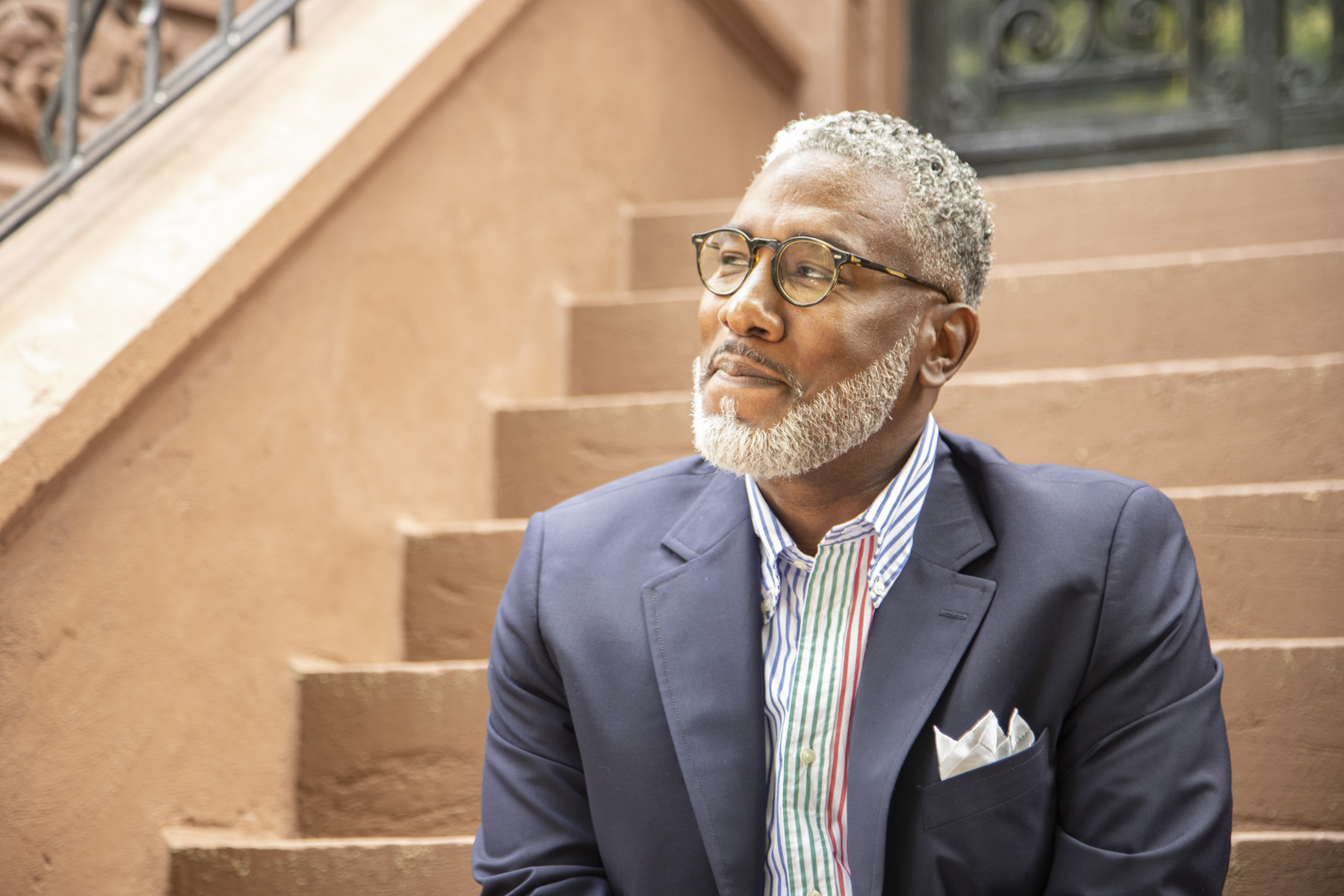
Conrad Tillard

From 2010 to 2015, former Nation of Islam minister and "Hip Hop Minister" Conrad Tillard served as a radio talk show host on WBLS, which broadcast his hour-long Sunday Night Live community-issues program for five years.

WBLS acquired WRKS's intellectual property in a merger of the two outlets announced on April 26, with a joint statement on both stations' respective websites. In addition to acquiring WRKS's intellectual property, WBLS and WLIB also moved into Emmis's New York production facility in the West Village section of Manhattan, into studio space vacated by WRKS during the week of May 21, 2012.

During the 2012–13 NBA season, WBLS broadcast selected New York Knicks games in an agreement with WEPN-FM. These games conflicted with WEPN-FM's coverage of the NFL's New York Jets when both teams were scheduled to play on Sunday afternoons.

On February 11, 2014, Emmis Communications announced it would purchase WBLS and WLIB from YMF Media LLC for $131 million, pending FCC approval. The purchase was consummated on June 10, 2014. On July 1, 2019, Emmis announced that it would sell WBLS and WQHT to the public company Mediaco Holding—an affiliate of Standard General—for $91.5 million and a $5 million promissory note. Emmis will be a shareholder in Mediaco Holding and continue to operate the stations. The sale was consummated on November 25, 2019.

== Online ==
In 2000 WBLS launched its interactive sister site WBLSi with radio internet convergence company FMITV in Burbank, California, WBLSi.com featured live original music streams to cater to a variety of tastes – The Jamz, Slow Jamz, Hip-Hop and WBLS Classics with on-demand access to concerts and music videos. Wendy Williams, Egypt Sherrod, and Rap City's Big Lez doubled on the online platform as IJ's or WBLS' the first internet jockeys. The first internet program director of WBLSi was Hakeem Khaaliq.
