= History of radio disc jockeys =

History of radio employees

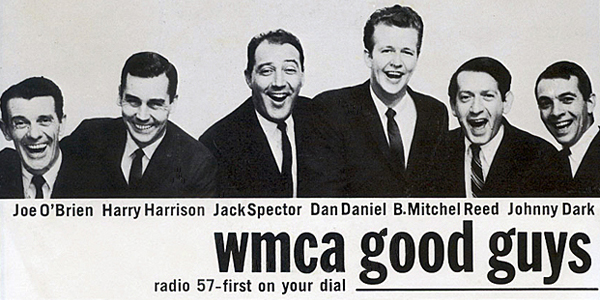
Disc jockeys at WMCA (AM) New York in 1964

The history of radio disc jockeys covers the time when gramophone records were first transmitted by experimental radio broadcasters to present day radio personalities who host shows featuring a variety of recorded music.

For a number of decades beginning in the 1930s, the term "disc jockey", "DJ", "deejay", or "jock" was exclusively used to describe on-air personalities who played selections of popular recorded music on radio broadcasting stations.

The term "disc jockey" first appeared in print in a 1941 issue of Variety magazine, although the origin of the term is generally attributed to American radio news commentator Walter Winchell who used it to describe radio presenter Martin Block's practice of introducing phonograph recordings to create a Make Believe Ballroom experience for radio listeners. The term combined "disc", referring to phonograph disc records, and "jockey", denoting the DJs practice of riding the audio gain, or alternately, riding a song to success and popularity.

Culminating in the "golden age" of Top 40 radio, from approximately 1955 to 1975, radio DJs established a style of fast talking patter to bookend three minute pop songs. Unlike the modern club DJ who mixes transitions between songs to create a continuous flow of music, radio DJs played individual songs or music tracks while voicing announcements, introductions, comments, jokes, and commercials in between each song or short series of songs.

During the 1950s, 60s and 70s, radio DJs exerted considerable influence on popular music, especially during the Top 40 radio era, because of their ability to introduce new music to the radio audience and promote or control which songs would be given airplay.

== 1900s to 1950s ==
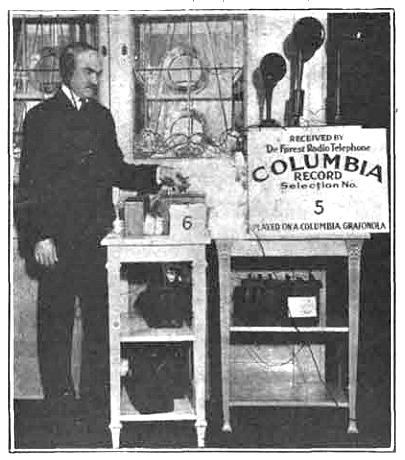
Lee de Forest broadcasting Columbia phonograph records on New York station 2XG in 1916.

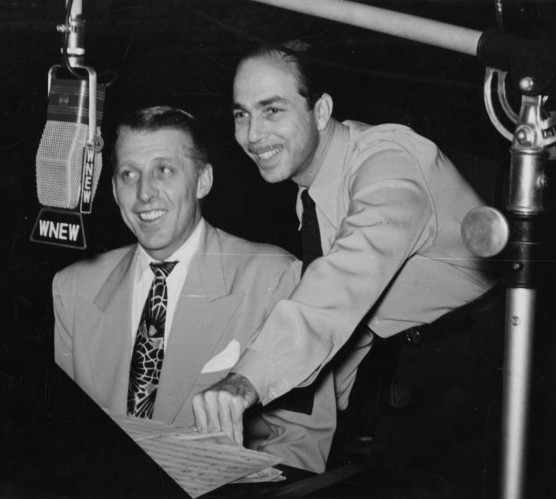
DJ Martin Block with Stan Kenton.

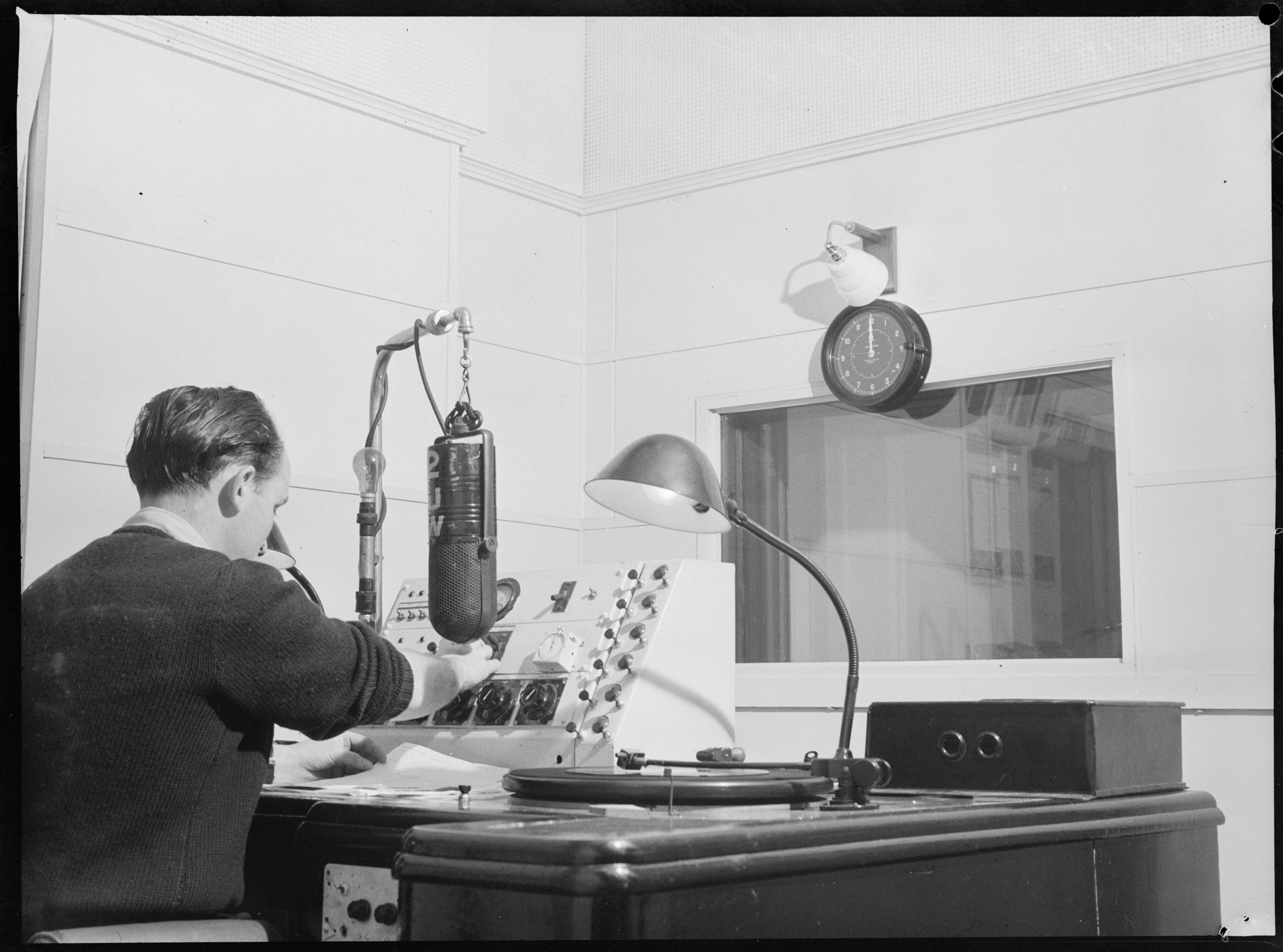
Nightshift begins for radio disc jockey, Sydney, 1949

In 1892, Emile Berliner began commercial production of his gramophone records, the first disc records to be offered to the public. The earliest broadcasts of recorded music were made by radio engineers and experimenters. On Christmas Eve 1906, American Reginald A. Fessenden broadcast both live and recorded music from Brant Rock, Massachusetts. In 1907, American inventor Lee de Forest broadcast a recording of the William Tell Overture from his laboratory in the Parker Building in New York City, claiming "Of course, there weren't many receivers in those days, but I was the first disc jockey".

Ray Newby, of Stockton, California claimed on a 1965 episode of CBS I've Got a Secret to be regularly playing records on a small transmitter while a student at Herrold College of Engineering and Wireless in San Jose, California in 1909. Elman B. Meyers started broadcasting a daily program in New York City in 1911 consisting mostly of recorded music. In 1914, his wife Sybil True broadcast records borrowed from a local music store.

In 1917 Captain Horace Donisthorpe, who was training radio operators for the British Army near Worcester, England, made unofficial broadcasts as engineer from a field. At first his wife Gertrude spoke into the microphone to Captain Donisthorpe alone, but later she broadcast to army camps nearby playing gramophone records. In 1967, she spoke about these experiments in a BBC radio programme called "Scrapbook for 1917". The first official British DJ was Christopher Stone, who in 1927 convinced the BBC to let him broadcast a program consisting of American and American-influenced jazz records interspersed with his ad libbed introductions.

One of the first woman disc jockeys was Halloween Martin. She was on WBBM (AM) in Chicago, as early as 1929, hosting a morning program she called the "Musical Clock." She played up-beat songs, gave the time and temperature, and read the latest weather. Martin's morning radio show format was uncommon in the late 1920s.

In 1935, American radio commentator Walter Winchell used the term "disc jockey" (the combination of disc, referring to the disc records, and jockey, which is an operator of a machine) as a description of radio announcer Martin Block, the first announcer to become a star. While his audience was awaiting developments in the Lindbergh kidnapping, Block played records and created the illusion that he was broadcasting from a ballroom, with the nation's top dance bands performing live. The show, which he called Make Believe Ballroom, was an instant hit.

Block was notable for his considerable influence on a records popularity. Block's program on station WNEW was highly successful, and Block was described as "the make-all, break-all of records. If he played something, it was a hit". Block later negotiated a multimillion-dollar contract with ABC for a syndicated nationwide radio show.

The earliest printed use of the term "disc jockey" appeared on August 13, 1941 when Variety published "... Gilbert is a disc jockey, who sings with his records." By the end of World War II, disc jockeys had established a reputation, as "hitmakers", someone whose influence "could start an artist's career overnight".

In the early radio age, broadcasters used "live" orchestras as well as prerecorded sound. Content typically included comedy, drama, news, music, and sports reporting. Most radio stations had an orchestra or band on the payroll. The Federal Communications Commission also clearly favored live music, providing accelerated license approval to stations promising not to use any recordings for their first three years on the air. Many noted recording artists tried to keep their recorded works off the air by having their records labeled as not being legal for airplay. It took a Federal court ruling in 1940 to establish that a recording artist had no legal right to control the use of a record after it was sold.

Disputes with the American Society of Composers, Authors, and Publishers (ASCAP) and the American Federation of Musicians (AFM) affected radio DJs during World War II. ASCAP and AFM cited the decline in demand for live appearances of musical artists due to the proliferation of radio disc jockeys playing recorded music. The disputes were settled in 1944.

== 1950s to present ==
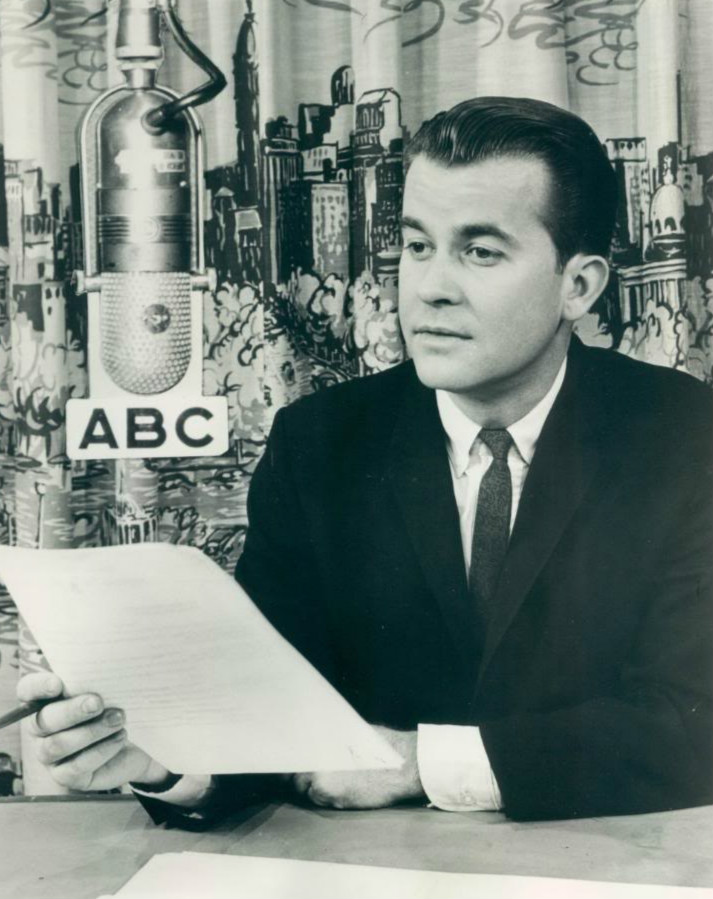
Dick Clark in 1963

The postwar period coincided with the rise of the radio disc jockey as a celebrity separate from the radio station, also known as a "radio personality". In the days before station-controlled playlists, the DJ often followed their personal tastes in music selection. DJs also played a role in exposing rock and roll artists to large, national audiences.

While at WERE (1300 AM) in Cleveland, Ohio, DJ Bill Randle was one of the first to introduce Elvis Presley to radio audiences in the northeastern U.S. At WMCA (AM), DJ Jack Spector was the first New York City radio personality to play the new Beatles' Capitol Records' single, "I Want to Hold Your Hand".

A top-rated radio host at WINS in New York City in the mid 1960s was Murray Kaufman, aka Murray the K. Kaufman took over the station's 7-11PM time period for several years. His show was known for its frenetic pace that incorporated segues, jingles, sound effects, and antics. After being invited by Beatles manager Brian Epstein to travel with the band, he came to be referred to as the "Fifth Beatle".

Notable U.S. radio disc jockeys of the period included Alan Freed, Wolfman Jack, Casey Kasem, and their British counterparts included the BBC's Brian Matthew and Alan Freeman, Radio London's John Peel, Radio Caroline's Tony Blackburn, and Radio Luxembourg's Jimmy Savile.

Radio DJ Alan Freed on New York City's WINS (AM) in 1955.

Alan Freed is commonly referred to as the "father of rock and roll" due to his promotion of the music and his introduction of the term rock and roll on radio in the early 1950s. Freed also made a practice of presenting music by African-American artists rather than cover versions by white artists on his radio program. Freed's career ended when it was shown that he had accepted payola, a practice that was highly controversial at the time, resulting in his being fired from his job at WABC.

WLAC radio DJ John R. (aka John Richbourg) in Nashville, Tennessee adopted the African-American Vernacular English of African-American DJ's in the early 1950s. Richbourg's practice of imitating African-American street dialect of the mid-twentieth century was so successful, that WLAC programmed an entire cohort of white DJ's that spoke like blacks did while playing music that was popular in the black community. It was not common knowledge that WLAC DJs were white until the mid-1960s. By then, the rebellious youth market made the nightly rhythm and blues station the one they tuned to for rock and roll, as atmospherics carried the signal enabling the station to be heard throughout much of the North American continent and Caribbean islands.

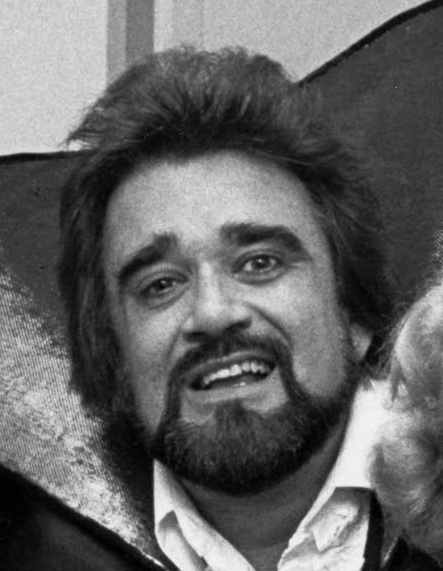
Wolfman Jack

Bob Smith (aka Wolfman Jack) began his career as an announcer on XERF located in Mexico and became an influential DJ who advocated for African American music on his long running rock and roll radio show. Many people thought Smith was a black DJ until he appeared as himself in the 1973 film American Graffiti. Smith hosted TV shows such as Midnight Special and Rock and Roll Palace.

A number of actors and media personalities began their careers as traditional radio disc jockeys who played and introduced records, such as Hogan's Heroes star Bob Crane, talk show host Art Bell, American Idol host Ryan Seacrest, and Howard Stern. Dick Clark was a radio DJ at WFIL in Philadelphia before he began hosting WFIL-TV's American Bandstand.

Radio DJs often acted as commercial brokers for their program and actively solicited paying sponsors. They could also negotiate which sponsors would appear on their program. Many wrote and delivered the commercials themselves, talking the place of advertising agencies who formerly executed these responsibilities.

Drive time or "morning drive" shows capitalized on a listening audience of weekday commuters and parents getting children ready for school. Morning DJs such as New York's Don Imus and DJ teams such as Mark and Brian in Los Angeles are examples of notable radio personalities whose morning drive format included playing songs as well as sharing stories and taking listener phone calls.

Radio disc jockey programs were often syndicated, at first with hourly musical programs with entertainers such as Dick Powell and Peggy Lee acting as radio DJs introducing music and providing continuity and commentary, and later with radio personalities such as Casey Kasem who hosted the first nationally syndicated Top 40 countdown show.

== Record hops ==
In the 1950s, radio disc jockeys from local and regional radio stations took advantage of their popularity and augmented their income by playing records and performing as master of ceremonies at teen dance parties called sock hops or record hops. The term came about because these events were commonly held at high schools, often in the school gym or cafeteria, and dancers were asked to remove their hard-soled shoes to protect the varnished floor of the gymnasium.

Record hops became strongly associated with early rock and roll. "At the Hop", a 1957 hit song by Danny and the Juniors, described the scene, "where the jockey is the smoothest, and the music is the coolest at the hop".

In addition to the DJ introducing and playing popular records, local bands and solo recording artists sometimes performed live at these events. Record hops were often sponsored by radio stations as a way to promote their disc jockeys, or by record stores to promote the sale of records. They were also sponsored by school or church organizations who considered them "wholesome recreation" for teenagers. Admission was either free, or a small admission fee was charged.

During the 1950s, Cleveland radio DJ Bill Randle personalized his own style of record hops called "Randle Romps" which he used to gauge the reactions of teenagers to new records he wished to promote while on the air. Cleveland DJ Alan Freed is credited with breaking down racial barriers by playing and promoting African American music at record hops in the early 1950s and 60s. In 1957 alone, disc jockey and American Bandstand host Dick Clark made 157 appearances at dances and record hops. Detroit radio DJ Robin Seymour is credited with influencing the success of The Supremes and The Four Tops by promoting their appearances at his record hops.

The practice of dancing to recorded music at record hops hosted by radio DJs in the 1950s influenced the emergence of the discotheque and modern club DJs who would later specialize in mixing a continuous flow of recorded music for live audiences.

== Pirate radio DJs ==
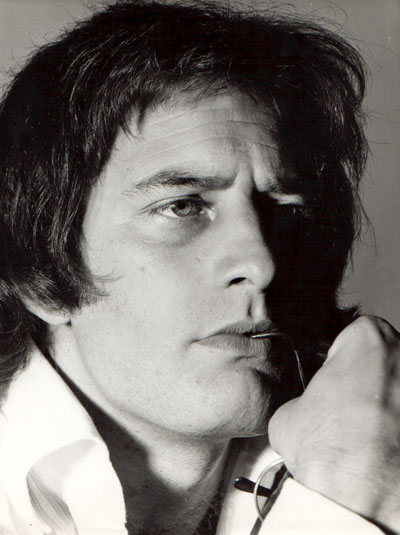
Radio Caroline DJ Emperor Rosko

During the 1960s, pirate radio stations proliferated off the coast of England in response to popular demand for new music not provided by the more traditional BBC radio stations. The pirate stations included Radio Caroline and its short-lived rival Radio Atlanta, Wonderful Radio London and Swinging Radio England. DJs such as John Peel, Tony Blackburn, Kenny Everett, Tony Prince, Emperor Rosko and Spangles Muldoon pioneered an innovative, American-influenced style of presentation, often programming their personal music choices rather than adhere to a strict playlist, thereby winning large audiences hungry for youth-oriented sounds and the latest musical trends. When the Marine Broadcasting Offences Act 1967 virtually ended pirate radio in 1967, many offshore pirate radio DJs moved to the relatively progressive land-based BBC Radio 1 which was established that same year as a response to the public's changing musical tastes.

== Wartime radio DJs ==
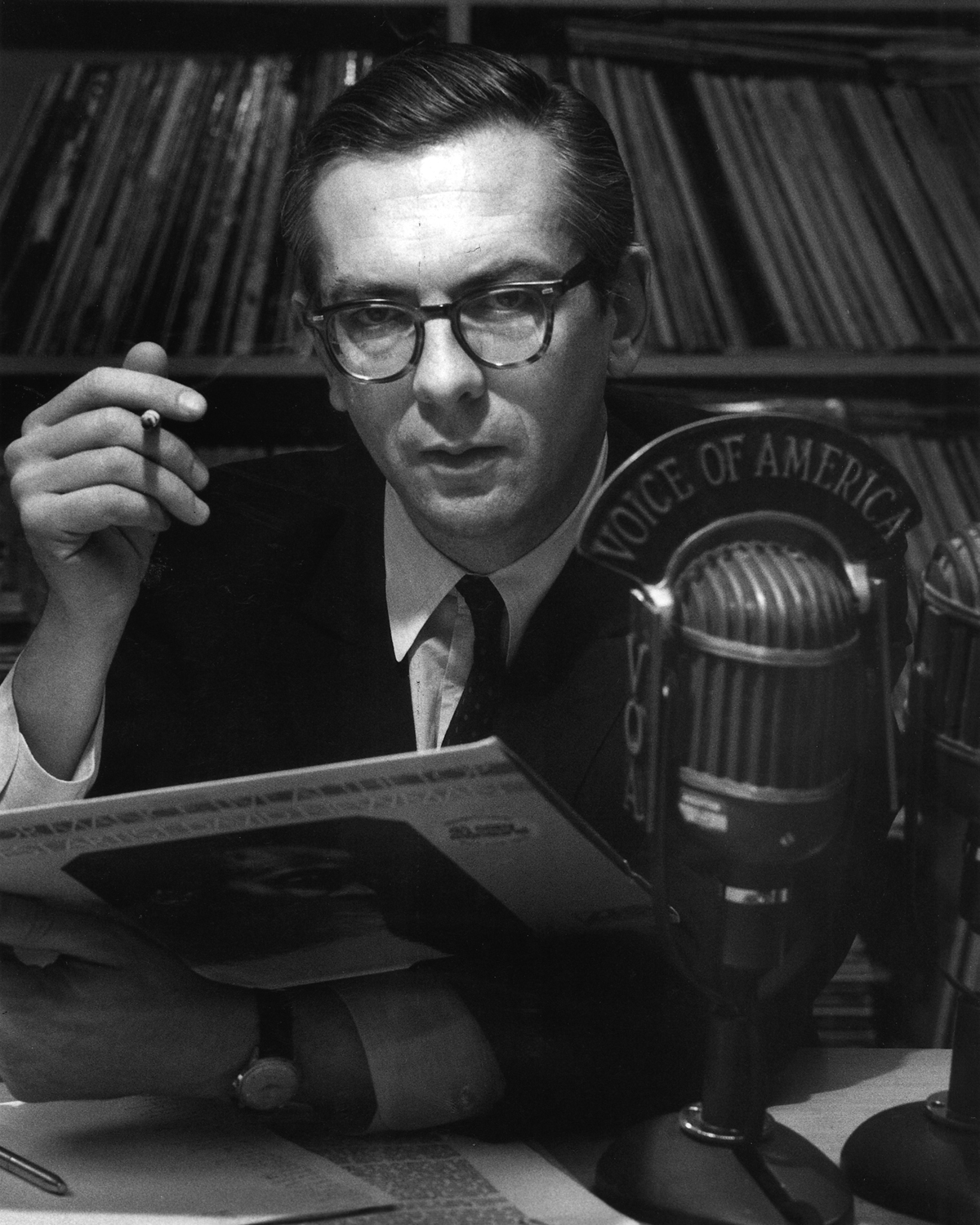
Willis Conover on the Voice of America in 1969

During World War II, disc jockey programs such as GI Jive were broadcast by the U.S. Armed Forces Radio Service to troops. GI Jive initially featured one of a series of guest DJs for each broadcast who would introduce and play popular recordings of the day; some were civilian celebrities, while others were servicemen. In May 1943, however, the format settled on a single regular host DJ, Martha Wilkerson, who was known on the air as "GI Jill." Axis powers radio broadcasts aimed at Allied troops also adopted the disc jockey format, featuring personalities such as Tokyo Rose and Axis Sally who played popular American recorded songs interspersed with propaganda.

From 1941 a record program was broadcast by the British "General Forces Programme" called Forces Favourites. One of the presenters was Jean Metcalfe. All the presenters were women as it was thought that high voices carried better on the short wave frequencies the GFP used. From 1 August 1945 the program was taken over as a joint production by BBC and British Forces Network and renamed Family Favourites. From 7 October 1945 a presenter from London introduced requests from servicemen's families in Britain and after each record a presenter based in Germany would play a record requested by a British serviceman stationed in Germany. Metcalfe later became the regular presenter from London. Later on there were occasional segments for service people stationed in other places such as Cyprus Malta and Singapore. Metcalfe was the main presenter from London until 1964. The program continued but became a program for British families spread across the rest of the world who were not connected with the armed services. During those years there were regular segments from Canada and Australia as well as Britain and other countries. The program itself was axed in 1980.

During the Vietnam War, United States Air Force sergeant Adrian Cronauer was a notable Armed Forces Radio disc jockey whose experiences later inspired the 1987 film Good Morning, Vietnam starring Robin Williams as Cronauer.

Cold War radio DJ Willis Conover's program on the Voice of America from 1955 through the mid-1990s featured jazz and other "prohibited" American music aimed at listeners in the Soviet Union and other Communist countries. Conover reportedly had "millions of devoted followers in Eastern Europe alone; his worldwide audience in his heyday has been estimated at up to 30 million people".

== African American disc jockeys ==
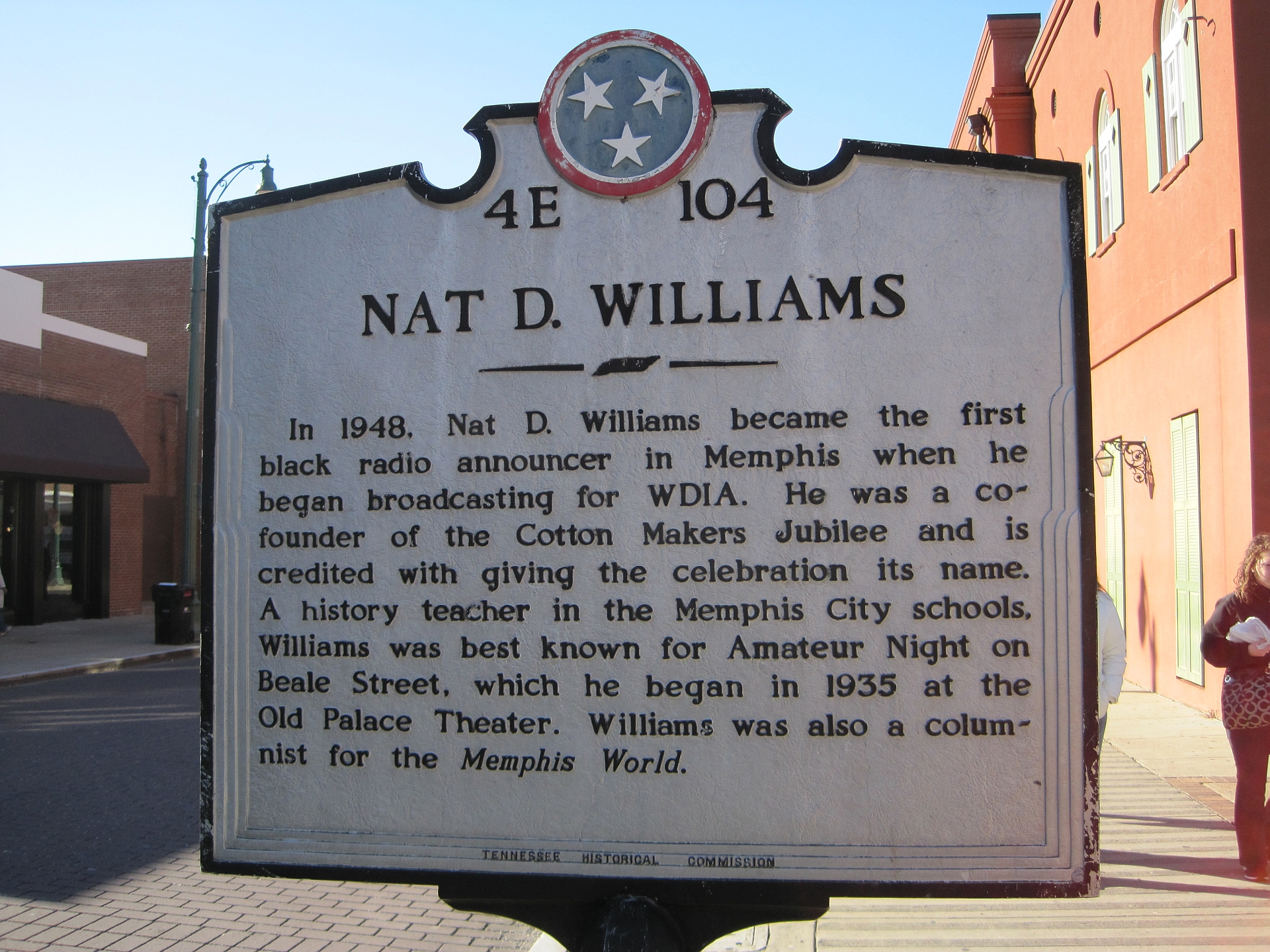
Plaque commemorating radio DJ Nat D. Williams in downtown Memphis, Tennessee

African American radio DJs emerged in the mid 1930s and late 1940s, mostly in cities with large black populations such as New York, Chicago, Los Angeles and Detroit.

Jack L. Cooper was on the air 9 1/2 hours each week on Chicago's WCAP and is credited with being one of the first black radio announcers to broadcast gramophone records, including gospel music and jazz, using his own phonograph.

DJ Herb Kent began his career in 1944 playing classical records on Chicago's WBEZ, then an FM broadcasting service for the Chicago Public Schools. During the 1950s, Kent worked at WGES in Chicago and then at WBEE where he coined the phrase "dusty records" or "dusties." He spent several years as one of the original DJs at WVON, a "heritage" station to Chicago's black community.

In 1939, Hal Jackson was the first African American radio sportscaster at WOOK-AM in Washington, DC, and later hosted The House That Jack Built, a DJ program of jazz and blues. Jackson moved to New York City in 1954, and was the first radio personality to broadcast three daily shows on three different New York stations. In 1990, Jackson was the first minority inducted into the National Association of Broadcaster's Hall of Fame.

Other prominent black DJs included Al Benson on WGES, who was the first popular disc jockey to play urban blues and use "black street slang" in his broadcasts. Jesse "Spider" Burke hosted a popular show on KXLW in Saint Louis, Missouri. James Early was featured on WROX (AM) in Clarkesdale, Mississippi. Ramon Bruce became a prominent DJ at WHAT (AM) in Philadelphia. Some of these radio pioneers of the Black-appeal radio period presaged the Top 40, playing recordings that were targeted to the black youth and reflected jukebox selections that were popular. Most major U.S. cities operated a full-time rhythm and blues radio station, and as African Americans traveled the country they would spread the word of their favorite radio personalities.

Nat D. Williams was the first African American disc jockey on WDIA in Memphis with his popular Tan Town Jamboree show. African American radio DJs found it necessary to organize in order to gain opportunities in the radio industry, and in the 1950s Jack Gibson of WERD formed the National Jazz, Rhythm and Blues Disc Jockey Association. The group's name was later changed to the National Association of Radio and Television Announcers. In 1960, radio station managers formed the Negro Radio Association to foster and develop programming and talent in the radio broadcasting industry.

== Women disc jockeys ==
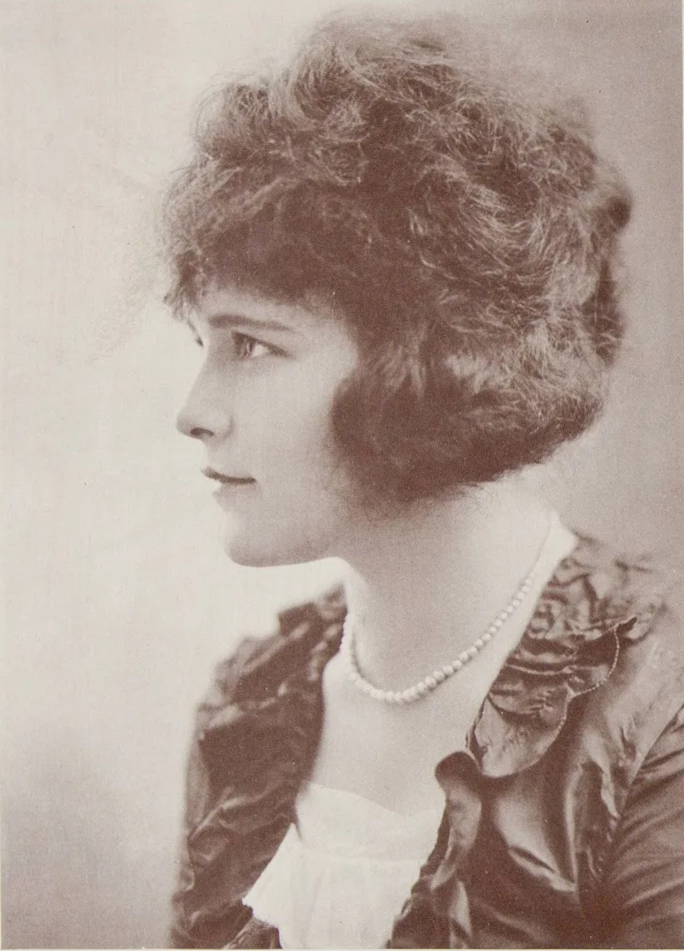
Halloween Martin, Chicago's first woman DJ

With exceptions such as Halloween Martin's work in 1929 at WBBM in Chicago, the radio DJ profession in the U.S. was historically male-dominated. However beginning in the Top 40 era, female disc jockeys became more common. Judy Dibble on WDGY in Minneapolis started as "sidekick" to a male DJ in the mid 1960s and later went on to host her own DJ show.

Marge Anthony became a regular member of the DJ staff in 1963 at CKGM in Montreal.

Alison Steele began her career at WNEW-FM in the late 1960s. Responding to an ad for female disc jockeys, Steele auditioned with 800 other women and was chosen with three others to launch an "all woman" format. When WNEW abandoned this format in 1967 after an 18‐month trial, Steele was the only one asked to stay on. As a late night show host, Steele created an on-air persona, calling herself "The Nightbird". Her popularity grew, drawing an average nightly audience of 78,000. In 1976, Steele was the first woman chosen by Billboard magazine as "FM Personality of the Year", and she was instrumental in promoting performers such as the Moody Blues. She worked as an announcer for Search for Tomorrow and also as a producer at CNN, returning to WNEW in 1984. In later years, she was known as "The Grand Dame of New York Night".

Maxanne Sartori was the first female progressive rock DJ on KOL-FM in Seattle and was subsequently hired in 1970 as an afternoon DJ for WBCN-FM in Boston. Sartori has been credited with influencing the success of artists such as Aerosmith and The Cars.

In 1973, Yvonne Daniels was the first female DJ hired by WLS (AM) in Chicago. 99X FM, RKO radio group in New York hired Paulie Riccio in 1974. WABC (AM) in New York hired DJ Liz Kiley in 1979.

Radio disc jockey Donna Halper is credited with discovering the rock band Rush while working as a radio DJ at WMMS in Cleveland in 1974. After Halper played a track called “Working Man” on the air, listeners began requesting more Rush songs, prompting other radio stations to add Rush songs to their playlists. Acknowledging her role in their success, the band dedicated its first two albums to her. Halper appeared in the documentary, Rush: Beyond the Lighted Stage, and spoke at Rush's Hollywood Walk of Fame ceremony.

DJ Karen Begin (aka Darian O'Toole) is credited with being the first female shock jock. She promoted herself as the "Morning Beyotch" and "The Antidote to Howard Stern" on her show on San Francisco radio stations KSAN and KFRC-FM in the late 1990s.

"Less than a handful" of women were employed as radio DJs in Britain before the 1970s. DJ Annie Nightingale hosted a progressive rock show on BBC Radio 1 in 1969. In 1998, Zoe Ball began hosting the BBC's key breakfast show slot, followed by Sarah Cox in 2000.

== Payola scandal ==
Especially during the 1950s, the sales success of any record depended to a large extent on its airplay by popular radio disc jockeys. The illegal practice of payment or other inducement by record companies for the radio broadcast of recordings on commercial radio in which the song is presented by a DJ as being part of the normal day's broadcast became known in the music industry as "payola". The first major United States Senate payola investigation occurred in 1959. Nationally renowned DJ Alan Freed, who was uncooperative in committee hearings, was fired as a result. DJ Dick Clark also testified before the committee, but survived, partially due to the fact that he had previously divested himself of ownership interest in all of his music-industry holdings.

After the initial investigation, radio DJs were stripped of the authority to make programming decisions, and payola became a misdemeanor offense. Programming decisions became the responsibility of station program directors. As a result, the process of persuading stations to play certain songs was simplified. Instead of reaching numerous DJs, record labels only had to connect with one station program director. Labels turned to independent promoters to circumvent allegations of payola.

== Format changes ==
As radio stations moved from the AM Top 40 format to the FM album-oriented rock format or adopted more profitable programming such as news and call-in talk shows, the impact of the radio DJ on popular music was lessened. The emergence of shock jock personalities and morning zoo formats saw the DJs role change from music host to cultural provocateur and comedian.

From the late 50s to the late 1980s when the Top 40 music radio format was popular, audience measuring tools such as ratings diaries were used. However a combination of financial pressures and new technology such as voice tracking and the Portable People Meter (PPM) began to have negative effects on the role of radio DJs beginning in the late 1990s, prompting one radio program manager to comment, "There was a time when the “top 40” format was ruled by legends such as Casey Kasem, or Wolfman Jack, and others who were known for both playing the hits and talking to you. Now with PPMs, it is all about the music, commercials and the format." Such format changes as well as the rise of new music distribution models such as MP3 and online music stores led to the demise of radio DJs reputation as trendsetters and "hit makers" who wielded considerable influence over popular music.

== In film ==
- The Fog - Adrienne Barbeau plays fictional small town radio DJ Stevie Wayne.
- Private Parts - Howard Stern plays himself in a dramatized treatment of his career as a radio DJ.
- American Hot Wax - Tim McIntire plays real-life radio DJ Alan Freed.
- American Graffiti - Wolfman Jack (Bob Smith) appeared as himself in the 1973 film.
- The Boat That Rocked - Based on radio DJs of the real-life offshore pirate Radio Caroline.
- Play Misty for Me - Clint Eastwood plays fictional radio DJ Dave Garver who is menaced by a stalker.
- Good Morning, Vietnam - Robin Williams plays real-life Armed Forces Radio DJ Adrian Cronauer.
- Talk to Me - Don Cheadle plays real-life radio DJ Petey Greene.
- Pontypool - Stephen McHattie plays fictional radio DJ Grant Mazzy.
- FM - Michael Brandon plays fictional DJ Jeff Dugan.

== See also ==
- Radio personality
- Black-appeal stations
- Archives of African American Music and Culture
