= Ed Castleberry =

Ed ‘Eddie’ Castleberry (1928–2009) was a pioneering newscaster, columnist, and air personality at the Mutual Black Network, which produced 5-minute news spots that were broadcast on affiliated radio stations. MBN was later taken over by rival Sheridan Broadcasting Company in 1978 and by 1990 SBN had over 150 affiliates and grossed $15 million annually.

== Early years ==
Born in Alabama, he attended Birmingham’s Miles College, a HBCU, for a year before induction to the U.S. Navy. After returning home to Birmingham in 1950, he auditioned for and was subsequently hired by radio station WEDR.

Castleberry stood out as an on-air personality jock, one of the nation’s first Thirteen, black disc jockeys who played R & B, talked jive and played popular blues music. They didn’t talk down to their audience and spoke in ‘street’ vernacular, they read the mail on air and spoke for the community. White DJ’s emulated them as they brought a fresh voice to radio. Other black DJs sought to assimilate to the white radio announcers and frowned on ‘slang; Castleberry and his cohort spoke to the man in the street as populists, repeating their language. He also broke new talent, broadcast live "man in the street" interviews, and promoted new products in his news broadcasts that did not make national programs. He created the entertainment departments at MBN and SBN news networks and was both a music director and program director at radio stations.

== Career ==
Ed began in the newsroom of WEDR in Birmingham, Ala at the first black-programmed radio station (white-owned) which had problems with the KKK in 1949. The locals kept taking down the broadcast antenna to deter broadcasting. Program director Shelly (the Playboy) Stewart felt that ‘mass’ communication came before ‘class’ and stuck with the R & B format, which gained traction in the black community. Unlike other negro-themed stations at the time, the voices heard did not sound like typical radio (read: white) announcers, but had the deeper voices that would come to dominate the speaking stream with the advent of Black appeal radio. Castleberry was one deep voice that became associated with the format and the station's mail began to reflect that popularity in 1950.

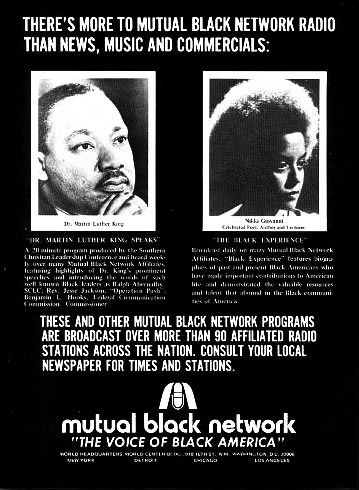
Mutual Black Network 1974 commercial poster

His radio stations over the years spanned the south, the Midwest and the northeast. Starting as a disc jockey at WEDR and WJLD (Birmingham, AL), he moved in the circuit covered by WQOK (Greenville, SC), WMBM (Miami, FL), WCIN (Cincinnati, OH), WABQ (Cleveland, OH), WVKO (Columbus, OH), WHAT (AM) (Philadelphia, PA), WEBB and WJZ-TV (Baltimore, MD), and WASH (DC).

In 1972 he debuted at the Mutual Black Network where he remained for 14 years, producing the five minute news spots that played in all major markets and hosted a news and variety show where he interviewed celebrities, showing a side of them that didn’t get aired on the larger networks but was important to his audience.

The Mutual Broadcasting System launched the first black all-news network using leased lines in New York and Washington, D.C. Castleberry headed the Wash, DC office which distributed programs to 90 affiliates. MBN was bought by its minority shareholder SBC in 1981 and renamed SBN, in 1991 American Urban Radio Network took that in and with 250 outlets became the largest black news network in the country.

== Television ==
Castleberry made his mark working with Larry Dean at Cincinnati's famed WCIN. Many in the business knew that Castleberry and "Gentleman" Dean were the real models for Venus Flytrap and Dr. Johnny Fever of television's WKRP in Cincinnati. Working for National Black Network and its 25 affiliates meant working out of studios for New York's flagship station for Hal Jackson's Inner City Broadcasting Corp, WWRL-AM, alongside DJ's Frankie Crocker, Jocko Henderson and Bob Law.

== Honors ==
Jack Gibson honored Shelly Stewart, Ed Castleberry, Charles Scruggs, Hal Jackson and Martha Steinberg in August 1993 at a Jack the Rapper radio convention event and inducted them into the Black Radio Hall of Fame for their pioneering work in the industry. He received public service awards and a proclamation by the Alabama House of Representatives. For promoting jazz on the radio, he was Inducted into the Alabama Jazz Hall of Fame in 1986, and in 1993 was inducted into the Black Broadcasters Hall of Fame.

== Death and legacy ==
Castleberry retired from radio in the early 1990s and died in New York in 2009 at the age of 81. "Eddie" was a pioneering radio personality, newscaster and columnist whose career spanned over forty years. His personal papers, photographs and memorabilia were donated to the Archives of African American Music and Culture at Indiana University. Castleberrie has four children, Terrie Montgomery born in 1956 who resides in Miami, Florida where she was born, Sharon Castleberry who resides in California, a daughter, Susan Castleberry, born in Colombia, Ohio in 1966 with his first wife Jan, and a stepson Marty from his second marriage.

== See also ==
- WEDR
- WLAC
- WERD (Atlanta)
- WDIA
- Jack Gibson
- DJ Nat D.
- Glossary of jive talk
- Jive talk
