= Jazz rap =

Subgenre of hip-hop

- Other names: Jazz hip-hop, jazz hop
- Stylistic origins: East Coast hip hop; Boom bap; jazz; alternative hip-hop
- Cultural origins: Late 1980s, New York metropolitan area
- Derivative forms: Lofi hip-hop; nu jazz; trip hop; psychedelic rap; experimental hip-hop; conscious hip-hop

Jazz rap (also known as jazz hop or jazz hip-hop) is a fusion of jazz and hip hop music, as well as an alternative hip-hop subgenre, that developed in the late 1980s and early 1990s. An article on AllMusic explains that the genre "was an attempt to fuse African-American music of the past with a newly dominant form of the present, paying tribute to and reinvigorating the former while expanding the horizons of the latter." The rhythm was rooted in hip hop over which repetitive phrases of jazz instrumentation, such as the trumpet, double bass, etc., were placed. The groups involved in the formation of jazz rap included A Tribe Called Quest, Digable Planets, De La Soul, Gang Starr, and Jungle Brothers.

== Overview ==
The London club scene in the 1960s and 1970s became a canvas for the rare mixing of Jazz tracks. Such tracks were from the Blue Note catalogue, a collection of American Jazz music. Accompanied by percussion rhythms, a splash of funk, producing a new sub-genre known as acid jazz. Stepping into the 1980s, DJs innovated this sound further while implementing techniques. Collaborations between hip-hop DJs and jazz musicians such as Herbie Hancock and DJ Grand Mixer D.ST with their 1983 song "Rockit" laid a crucial foundation for what would soon become jazz rap.

Jazz rap's emergence can be seen as an attempt to elevate rap music's status by associating it with jazz's cultural capital , and was seen as an alternative to dominant rap subgenres like gangsta and pop rap. This association not only enriched the musical texture of hip-hop but also provided a platform for social and political commentary, aligning with jazz's historical role as a voice for African American experiences and struggles.

== History ==
In 1989, Gang Starr released the debut single "Words I Manifest", sampling Dizzy Gillespie's 1952 "Night in Tunisia", and Stetsasonic released "Talkin' All That Jazz", sampling Lonnie Liston Smith. Gang Starr's debut LP, No More Mr. Nice Guy (Wild Pitch, 1989), and their track "Jazz Thing" (CBS, 1990) for the soundtrack of Mo' Better Blues, further popularized the jazz rap style. In 1992, Eric B & Rakim used wood bass on "Don't Sweat the Technique".

Digable Planets' 1993 release Reachin' (A New Refutation of Time and Space) was a hit jazz rap record. It sampled the likes of Don Cherry, Sonny Rollins, Art Blakey, Herbie Mann, Herbie Hancock, Grant Green, and Rahsaan Roland Kirk. Additionally, it spawned the hit single "Rebirth of Slick (Cool Like Dat)".

In 1993, Us3 released Hand on the Torch on Blue Note Records. All samples were from the Blue Note catalogue. The single "Cantaloop" was Blue Note's first gold record.

Post-WWII swing and modern jazz had fused with the introduction of Black appeal radio, which attracted a younger audience through its reliance on jive idioms, rhyming, and cadence-laden rap verses. Dizzy Gillespie had pointed to The Jives of Dr. Hepcat and rhyming D.J. Daddy-O Daylie as key to popularizing modern jazz. The rise of Top-40 radio on the strength of the rapping DJs in this period of radio's rebirth among black youth led to the wider use of language and syntax popularizing rap. Muhammad Ali's phrasing to the press in the early part of his career was born of listening to black radio of the 1950s, which was often white radio announcers speaking slang "jive" and imitating black announcers while withholding the fact on air of their backgrounds. Pioneering DJs Al Benson, Nat D., and Jack the Rapper all used rhyming, the dozens, and jive talk to pepper their broadcasts and were widely copied by white DJs like John Richbourg, Gene Nobles, and Bill Allen during the 1950s, whose influence on James Brown and other godfathers of rap was formative. Bebop was the backing track that modern jazz credits with being the foundation of black appeal, radio is based on.

=== Native Tongues ===
Groups making up the collective known as the Native Tongues tended toward jazzy releases: these include the Jungle Brothers' debut, Straight Out the Jungle (Warlock, 1988), and A Tribe Called Quest's People's Instinctive Travels and the Paths of Rhythm (Jive, 1990). The Low End Theory has become one of hip hop's most acclaimed albums, and also earned praise from jazz bassist Ron Carter, who played double bass on one track. De La Soul's Buhloone Mindstate (Tommy Boy, 1993) featured contributions from Maceo Parker, Fred Wesley, and Pee Wee Ellis, and samples from Eddie Harris, Lou Donaldson, Duke Pearson , and Milt Jackson.

Also of this period was Toronto-based Dream Warriors' 1991 release And Now the Legacy Begins (Island). It produced the hit singles "My Definition of a Boombastic Jazz Style" and "Wash Your Face in My Sink". The first of these was based on a loop taken from Quincy Jones' "Soul Bossa Nova", while the second sampled Count Basie's 1967 rendition of "Hang On Sloopy". Meanwhile, Los Angeles hip-hop group Freestyle Fellowship pursued a different route of jazz influence in recordings with unusual time signatures and scat-influenced vocals.

=== Jazz artists come to hip-hop. ===
Though jazz rap had achieved little mainstream success, jazz legend Miles Davis' final album (released posthumously in 1992), Doo-Bop, featured hip-hop beats and collaborations with producer Easy Mo Bee. Jazz musician Branford Marsalis collaborated with Gang Starr's DJ Premier on his Buckshot LeFonque project that same year. Between 1993 and 2007, fellow Gang Starr member Guru released the Jazzmatazz series, which featured guest appearances from jazz artists such as Lonnie Liston Smith, Freddie Hubbard , and Donald Byrd, amongst others.

=== Since 1994 ===
Musical jazz references became less obvious and less sustained, and lyrical references to jazz certainly rarer. However, jazz had been added to the palette of hip-hop producers, and its influence continued throughout the 1990s, whether behind the gritty street tales of Nas (Illmatic, Columbia, 1994), or backing the more bohemian sensibilities of acts such as the Roots, the Nonce, and Common. Since the 2000s, it can be detected in the work of producers such as J. Rawls, Fat Jon , and Madlib. A project somewhat similar to Buckshot Le Fonque was Brooklyn Funk Essentials, a New York–based collective that also released its first LP in 1994. Prince himself contributed to the genre on some songs from 1991 to 1992, as well as with his New Power Generation album Gold Nigga, which mixed jazz, funk, and hip-hop and was released very confidentially.

One hip hop project that continued to maintain a direct connection to jazz was Guru's Jazzmatazz series, which used live jazz musicians in the studio. Spanning from 1993 to 2007, its four volumes assembled jazz luminaries like Freddie Hubbard, Donald Byrd, Courtney Pine, Herbie Hancock, Kenny Garrett , and Lonnie Liston Smith, and hip-hop performers such as Kool Keith, MC Solaar, Common, and Guru's Gang Starr colleague DJ Premier.

Madlib's 2003 release, Shades of Blue, is said to pay homage to his Blue Note Records roots, where he samples from Blue Note's archives. The album also contains interpretations of Blue Note classics, performed by Yesterdays New Quintet.

Kendrick Lamar's 2015 album To Pimp A Butterfly prominently featured jazz instrumentation on tracks, and its musical scope was critically acclaimed. Following the recording of the album, more recordings from the project with jazz, soul, and funk influences were released as the compilation album Untitled Unmastered in 2016.

== See also ==
- East Coast hip-hop
- Jazz-funk
- Soul jazz
- Trip hop
- Malcolm X
