= Al Benson =

American businessman and radio promoter (1908–1978)

- Born: Arthur Bernard Leaner; June 30, 1908; Jackson, Mississippi, US
- Died: September 6, 1978 (aged 70); Berrien Springs, Michigan, US
- Occupation(s): Radio DJ, music promoter, preacher, businessman, civil rights activist

Arthur Bernard Leaner (June 30, 1908 – September 6, 1978), who was known professionally as Al Benson, was an American radio DJ, music promoter and record label owner in Chicago between the 1940s and 1960s. He was particularly significant for his promotion of rhythm and blues music and black involvement in the recording industry in Chicago.

Leaner was also an ordained minister and activist, and became an important figure in the civil rights movement in Chicago. In 2017 he was inducted into the Blues Hall of Fame.

== Biography ==
He was born in Jackson, Mississippi. He learned tap dancing with his father's jazz band as a child, and worked in vaudeville shows before moving with his parents in 1923 to Chicago. There, he founded a storefront church, and worked in a wide variety of jobs including cook and probation officer, as well as becoming an established figure in Congressman William Dawson's political machine. As Rev. Arthur Leaner, he made his first broadcasts, of sermons and gospel music, on radio station WGES in 1943.

In 1945, using the pseudonym Al Benson, he started broadcasting a regular weekly one-hour secular show on WGES, in a different slot in which – unlike in the religious program – he was allowed to advertise products. He referred to himself on air as "the Old Swingmaster". Within two years, his output had increased to twenty hours a week, on WGES and WJJD, and in 1948 he was voted the most popular DJ in Chicago. The following year, he was elected to the honorary post of "Mayor of Bronzeville", which he won for several consecutive years, a testament to his huge popularity among African-Americans in the city. This is attributed to the fact that he spoke in colloquial terms with a strong Southern accent, like many of those who had migrated to the city, and that he played many of the blues and rhythm and blues records that had previously been ignored by broadcasters because of their "suggestive" lyrics and "lowlife" connotations.

Although there had been earlier black personalities on radio in Chicago, notably Jack L. Cooper, Benson later said:

Radio was a field that was very difficult for Black people to get into in the 1940s.... When I got into radio it was my very ambition and intention to let people know who I was. However I did not identify myself by being degrading, being uncouth or using bad English. But I used certain terms that we Black folks are accustomed to using. Slang usage—and that alone picked up my identity. My approach to the people was down to earth. I did not talk down to them. I was on their level. I made them feel that "he is one of us."

DJ Lucky Cordell said:

[Benson] played the music that they were accustomed to hearing and that music could not be found anywhere else on the radio. Nobody was playing the blues. The blues that was played might be Dinah Washington or Jazz. Al Benson came on and played Howlin' Wolf, Muddy Waters, and so forth and started to satisfy the people. If I had to hazard a guess, his audience included about seventy percent of the Black population. I don't know how fast his recognition came, as far as sponsors, but as soon as the word got around that there was a guy on radio playing those records, and the word was passed along in the Black community, Benson was made.

By 1950, he was broadcasting ten hours each day on three stations: WGES, WJJD, and WAAF. He became popular among both local and national advertisers for his ability to sell the products that they were marketing, former WGES executive Elizabeth Hinzman describing him as "the greatest salesman that I have ever known". His power to influence the record-buying public gave him great influence over the local recording industry. It was said that he "revolutionized Chicago's Black radio programming," and that "..he was the main reason why so many independent black record companies featuring rhythm and blues and even gospel artists grew."

In the early 1950s he also helped set up record labels, including Parrot, Blue Lake, and Old Swing-Master, to cater for the growing demand for blues and R&B music. The labels recorded such musicians as T-Bone Walker, J.B. Lenoir, Sunnyland Slim, Albert King, Willie Mabon, Coleman Hawkins, Lorez Alexandria, and, later in the 1960s, Magic Sam and others. At the height of his popularity in the 1950s he had regular television shows, and sponsored many rock and roll and R&B concerts in Chicago. He encouraged younger black DJs to follow in his path. He also became the owner of a newspaper, record shop, restaurant, and boutique, which all hired mostly African-American staff.

Although changing tastes and Benson's "flamboyant and self-willed" character eventually undermined his popularity, he remained actively involved in the civil rights movement, ensuring the integration of nightclubs that had refused to serve black customers, and on one occasion in 1956 hiring an airplane to drop 5,000 copies of the United States Bill of Rights over Mississippi. Benson retired from broadcasting at WVON in 1963, and for a time returned to being a pastor while maintaining some of his business interests and moving to live in Three Oaks, Michigan. In later life he encountered problems and became ill with poor blood circulation, causing amputation of his legs, thus limiting his ability to work and pay taxes, resulting in the IRS taking his home. He later became ill with lung cancer.

He died in Berrien Springs, Michigan, in 1978 at the age of 70. At the time of his death, he was survived by his wife, Norma Jean, who later succumbed to brain cancer. He had two surviving children, Arleta Leaner (Parker) who took after her father and worked in radio and television and his youngest daughter, Bertina Leaner (Clark). In 2017, he was nominated for the Blues Hall of Fame, the following year he became one of the inductees for Individual: Business — Production – Media or Academic.

== Bands ==
Bands produced by Benson included The Parrots, the first group he produced; The Pelicans with "Aurelia" and "White Cliffs of Dover" (1953); and many others.

== See also ==
- African American firsts
- Hal Jackson
- Doctor Hep Cat
- DJ Nat D.
- Yvonne Daniels
- Daddy-O Daylie
- Jocko Henderson
- Jockey Jack/Jack the Rapper
- Black-appeal stations
- WERD (Atlanta)
- Glossary of jive talk
- Jive talk
