= WDIA =

- Memphis, Tennessee; United States
- Broadcast area: Memphis metropolitan area
- Frequency: 1070 kHz
- Branding: AM 1070 WDIA

Programming
- Format: Urban oldies/classic soul

Ownership
- Owner: iHeartMedia; (iHM Licenses, LLC)
- Sister stations: KJMS; KWNW; WEGR; WHAL-FM; WHRK; WREC

History
- First air date: June 7, 1947
- Call sign meaning: Diane, name of original owner's daughter; "We Did It Again" (when owners also launched similar station in Jackson, Mississippi, after World War II)

Technical information
- Licensing authority: FCC
- Facility ID: 69569
- Class: B
- Power: 50,000 watts (day); 5,000 watts (night)
- Transmitter coordinates: 35°16′5″N 90°01′3″W

Links
- Public license information: Public file; LMS
- Webcast: Listen live (via iHeartRadio)
- Website: mywdia.iheart.com

WDIA (1070 AM) is a radio station based in Memphis, Tennessee. Active since 1947, it soon became the first radio station in the United States that was programmed entirely for African Americans. It featured black radio personalities; its success in building an audience attracted radio advertisers suddenly aware of a "new" market among black listeners. The station had a strong influence on music, hiring musicians early in their careers, and playing their music to an audience that reached through the Mississippi Delta to the Gulf Coast.

The station started the WDIA Goodwill Fund to help and empower black communities. Owned by iHeartMedia, the station's studios are located in Southeast Memphis, and the transmitter site is in North Memphis.

== History ==
WDIA went on the air June 7, 1947, from studios on Union Avenue. The owners, John Pepper and Bert Ferguson, were both white, and the format was a mix of country and western and light pop, as well as "homemaker shows", network shows and block programming that included soap operas and classical music. The original frequency was 730 kHz. The station did not do well until Ferguson learned about "targeted programming" and realized there was one audience in Memphis no other radio station served. Half of the listeners who could hear WDIA's signal were African-American, and WDIA hired the first black disk jockey in the South.

Nat D. Williams, a syndicated columnist and high-school teacher, started Tan Town Jubilee on October 25, 1948. This was one of the first radio programs in the United States to appeal to black listeners. WDIA soon became the number-2 station in Memphis. After a switch to all-black programming, WDIA became the city's top station. In June 1954, WDIA was licensed to increase its power from 250 to 50,000 watts, which meant moving to 1070 kHz. Its powerful signal reached the Mississippi Delta’s dense African-American population and was heard from the Missouri Bootheel to the Gulf Coast. WDIA reached 10% of the African-American population in the United States.

Future WJLB strong jock, Martha Jean "The Queen" Steinberg became known as "Princess Premium Stuff". Ernest Brazzell gave crop advice, and Robert Thomas became a DJ named “Honeyboy” after he won a citywide amateur competition. Among other notable personalities were Maurice "Hot Rod" Hulbert, Theo "Bless My Bones" Wade, and Ford Nelson, who continued as of 2013 as an active gospel DJ on WDIA.

WDIA is known for its community efforts throughout the years. A.C. Williams, a former disc jockey for the station, helped create the Goodwill Fund in 1954, and the station's identification announcement became, “You’re Listening to 50,000 Watts of Goodwill, W-D-I-A Memphis.”. Originally, the fund provided transportation to school for disabled black children. Later the fund expanded to include college scholarships, establish boy clubs, provide 125 Little League Teams to Memphis and neighboring communities, and help provide low cost supplemental housing (Wilson). "We have raised over $900,000 over the years," A.C. Williams says.

Many music legends got their start by working at WDIA, including B.B. King and Rufus Thomas. Elvis Presley was greatly influenced by the station. B.B. King joined WDIA in early 1949. He had a daily 15-minute show, promoting first a patent medicine called Pep-Ti-Kon, and later Lucky Strike cigarettes, the first major advertiser for the station. The next year, he took a DJ position on an afternoon show previously hosted by Maurice "Hot Rod" Hulbert. King credits his days on the station for building his audience and launching his career, describing the station as providing a sense of freedom.

Williams ended his show in 1972 following a stroke. Thomas continued to work at WDIA until he died in 2001. Bobby O'Jay became a popular host and was a mainstay until his death on May 3, 2022. The station's management had been mostly white. In 1972, Chuck Scruggs became its first black general manager and vice president, serving for 12 years. Scruggs played a major role in organizing the foundation and raising money to preserve the Lorraine Motel and found the National Civil Rights Museum in Memphis. In addition, he contributed to the redevelopment of Beale Street and Soulsville, USA.

In the 1970s and 1980s, the owners of WDIA also owned KDIA, a similarly formatted station in the San Francisco Bay Area. This callsign, however, is now assigned to an unrelated Christian-programmed station. In 1996, Clear Channel Communications, since rebranded as iHeartMedia, bought WDIA.

Logo when simulcasting on KJMS-HD2

In 2020 the Beale Street Historic District and the WDIA radio station were added from Memphis to the United States Civil Rights Trail.

== See also ==
- African American firsts
- Doctor Hep Cat
- Jack the Rapper
- Bob Perkins
- Yvonne Daniels
- Black-appeal stations
- WERD (Atlanta)
- Glossary of jive talk
- List of radio stations in Tennessee
