= Daddy-O Daylie =

American radio jock (1920–2003)

Holmes Daylie (May 15, 1920 – February 6, 2003) was a radio jock on radio stations in the 1940s and 1950s who rhymed, rapped, and played bebop and was one of the early pioneers of black-appeal radio. His upbeat patter and rhyming delivery from the 1940s to 1970s on stations WAAF, WMAQ, WAIT, WGN and other broadcast outlets and television stations brought Daddy-O-Daylie, as he was known, fame and following amongst both black and white audiences. He was inducted into the Black Radio Hall of Fame in Atlanta in 1990.

== Early life ==
Daylie's mother died giving birth in Covington, Tennessee, and his father died five years later; then an older brother, Clinton (he was the youngest of 12 siblings,) took him in. The family moved to South Side, Chicago while he was still a child. He attended John D. Shoop elementary and in 1938 he graduated Morgan Park High School where he was captain on the schools basketball team. This got him a six-month stint with the Harlem Globetrotters, which travelled around the country putting on basketball shows for African-Americans. Encountering racism in lodgings while travelling cross country, he returned to Chicago and embarked on a new career. Serving up tricks learned with the Globetrotters at his next job, he took to bartending and put their showmanship to the trade, spinning bottles, rhyming behind the bar while bouncing ice cubes with pratfalls to wow the crowd. His oldest friend, Dempsey Travis, recalled him as the trickster entertainer to customers while serving them drinks, flipping ice cubes behind him into glasses, saying "I'm as nice as a mother's advice", and keeping a steady banter going. While serving drinks at the whites only El Grotto Supper Club in the Pershing Hotel the host of the Today Show, Dave Garroway, caught his spiel and recommended that he put his talents to a better medium, suggesting radio. He enrolled in radio classes to learn the trade. When Garroway discovered Daylie, he was the host of the 1160 Club overnight on WMAQ, playing jazz.

== Career ==
The late 1940s in Chicago had Al Benson and Jockey Jack on the air and in 1948 Daddy-O became a radio host, his jazz knowledge, honed working in the entertainment district and his rhyming made him a standout on air. He called the show 'Jazz from Dad's Pad' and became the first DJ in the Chicago market to play jazz and be-bop as an antidote to swing as mainstays. Audiences who heard him thought he was friends with the musicians, he spoke like them and his friend Travis, who was a piano player, recalled that he sounded like a 'hepcat', in the jive argot of the day. He used his program to become active in Civil Rights and one of Daddy-O's special shout-outs on WGN was Operation Christmas Basket, which donated food to hungry Chicagoans during Christmastime. One of his favorite musicians was Eleanora Fagan and he knew Duke Ellington and Louis Armstrong from seeing their acts at the clubs where he had bartended. The Ramsey Lewis Trio credited him with getting them their big break with an audition at Chess Records in the 1950s. Grammy Award-winning pianist Ramsey Lewis later recalled, "One night he came through and said, 'Hey, you guys are pretty good. You should have an album out", and he set them up with the producers, Leonard and Phil Chess. The record did not pan out but Daddy-O played it on his radio program and the resulting buzz got the group bookings. He was the unofficial manager for the group for a number of years, along with the bassist Eldee Young and drummer Redd Holt who also played with Lewis. He also produced the trio's second album, Ramsey Lewis and his Gentle-men of Jazz.

In 1955 he sued the Loews movie chain and MGM for improper use of his copyrighted name, Daddy-O which he said was used in a derogatory manner in the movie Blackboard Jungle for $700,000. He had not authorized the use and asked for an injunction on the showing of the film. The suit was not successful. He copyrighted the name 'Daddy-O' in 1948.

Beginning in 1956, the overnight hours were his domain; "Daddy-O" brought his sense of humor, way with words and musical knowledge to WMAQ as he played cool jazz through the night. "Daddy-O" was the first African-American hosting a regularly scheduled radio show on a network owned and operated Chicago radio station. At AM 950 WNTD, previously WAAF, a daytime only station, Daddy-O played jazz in the late morning and was followed on air by Olympic great Jesse Owens who also played jazz from noon till 3 pm. During the period of black appeal radio and the rise of the personality jock, Black disc jockeys' phrasing on-air was distinctly ear-catching as the music they played. Each had a different style which played off the characteristics of the area of the country they were in. "Daddy-O" Daylie talked in hip rhymes to every record title as he played be-bop and jazz. Their influence was so overwhelming that there was a rush by the white deejays to imitate their style and patter. He was active in the NAACP, His civic activities included the Urban League and Operation PUSH, Rev. Jesse Jackson's organization in Chicago. He later became a co-owner of a Bowling Alley, the Starlite Bowling Lanes on 87th Street.

In 1958 hard bop saxophonist Cannonball Adderley wrote a piece dedicated to Holmes titled "One for Daddy-O".

In 2001 he was given writing credit on Memphis Blood: The Sun Sessions for the cut "Too Lazy to Work, Too Nervous to Steal" with Marl H. Young.

== Death ==
Daylie retired in 1988 and died Thursday, February 6, 2003, in Evergreen Park at Little Company of Mary Hospital. He was survived by his wife, Marcheta, and his elder brother, Oliver. Bruce DuMont, the president of the Museum of Broadcast Communications eulogized him, saying "He was one of the first major African-American radio personalities who not only had a following in the black community but had a following in the white community as well."

== Legacy ==
Be-bop trumpeter Dizzy Gillespie credited Daylie with changing the vernacular of modern Jazz. He popularized both the music and the jive idioms, and was a major innovator of hip-speak as a black vocabulary. The Be-bop revolt over Swing music was a sea change that was instrumental in the creation of Black Appeal radio stations. He was a fixture on the air in Chicago during the 1950s and 1960s, influencing Civil Rights and the black experience thru his on-air presence and having a large following of modern Jazz enthusiasts in that venue. His signature sign-on, "This is your musical host who loves you the most!" is as timeless as his news intro, "and now, old midnight sun, don't run, before we pay our musical dues. We wanna take you on a five-minute cruise through the world's latest news."

== See also ==
- WMAQ
- WNTD
- Jockey Jack/Jack the Rapper
- Al Benson
- Doctor Hep Cat
- DJ Nat D.
- Archives of African American Music and Culture
