= All About Jazz =

Jazz music database website

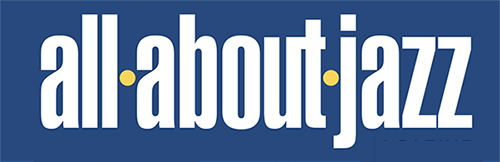
- Website type: Jazz music database
- Available in: English, Italian
- Founder: Michael Ricci
- Website: allaboutjazz.com
- Commercial: Yes
- Launched: August 15, 1995; 31 years ago

All About Jazz is a website established by Michael Ricci in 1995. A volunteer staff publishes news, album reviews, articles, videos, and listings of concerts and other events having to do with jazz. Ricci maintains a related site, Jazz Near You, about local concerts and events.

The Jazz Journalists Association voted All About Jazz Best Website Covering Jazz for thirteen consecutive years between 2003 and 2015, when the category was retired. In 2015, Ricci said the site received a peak of 1.3 million readers per month in 2007. Another source said that the site has over 500,000 readers around the world.

Ricci was born in Philadelphia, Pennsylvania, United States. He heard classical and jazz from his father's music collection. He played trumpet and went to his first jazz concert when he was eight. With a background in computer programming, he combined his interest in jazz and the internet by creating the All About Jazz website in 1995.

The website publishes reviews, interviews, and articles pertaining to jazz in the U.S. and around the world, including information about festivals, concerts, and other events.

In 2016, Ricci was given the Jazz Bridge Ambassador Award for his contributions to jazz in Philadelphia.
