= WAEC =

WAEC may refer to:

- WAEC (AM), a radio station (860 AM) licensed to Atlanta, Georgia, United States
- West African Examinations Council, an examination board in West African Anglophone countries
- Western Australian Electoral Commission, the agency overseeing elections in the Australian state of Western Australia
