= Bob Perkins (radio personality) =

American radio personality (1933–2025)

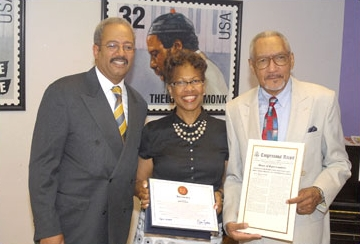
From right to left: Bob Perkins, his wife Sheila, and Congressman Chaka Fattah

Robert Perkins (December 6, 1933 – January 19, 2025) was an American radio personality who worked as a jazz program host and DJ in Philadelphia.

Perkins was known for his laid-back and mellow style. He was also a radio news journalist, and a First Call Master of Ceremonies for regional jazz music events.

== Radio career ==
Perkins got his first job in radio during a trip to visit his two brothers in Detroit in 1964. After breaking in as a DJ and announcer at WGPR-FM, he expanded to news at WCHB-AM. He worked as a newsman and assistant director at WJLB-AM in Detroit before returning to Philadelphia in 1969, where he joined WDAS-AM/FM.

His distinctive deep voice and progressive points of view became an on-air signature for the FM and AM operations at WDAS over 19 years during the 1970's and '80's. From 1988 to 1997, he hosted a jazz program on Saturday nights on WHYY-FM. During this time, he was also elected president of the Pennsylvania Associated Press Broadcasters Association and earned the distinction of being one of a select group of news directors and editors nationwide invited to interview President Jimmy Carter.

In 1997, Perkins became the PM drive-time jazz radio personality and host for WRTI-FM Temple University Radio. He stepped down from full-time broadcasting in 2022 and retired from the station in April 2023.

== Print media and other projects ==
Perkins briefly served as editorial director for The Philadelphia Tribune, where he wrote a commentary on government, society, and public affairs. He also wrote editorials and other articles for the former Philadelphia New Observer and Icon. Perkins also independently produced a radio documentary on the life of African American history icon Paul Robeson, who was born in the region and spent his last years living in Philadelphia.

== Personal life and death ==
Perkins was born on December 6, 1933 in South Philadelphia, where he was also raised. He credited his love for radio to his father, who repaired radios as a hobby when he was young.

Perkins later lived in Glenside, Pennsylvania, with his wife, Sheila.

Perkins died at Jefferson Abington Hospital in Abington, Pennsylvania, on January 19, 2025, at the age of 91.

== Honors and awards ==
Some of Perkins' major honors and awards for career accomplishments include:

- Mellon Jazz Community Service Award (2002)
- Inducted into the Philadelphia Broadcast Hall of Fame (2003)
- Inducted into the Broadcast Pioneers of Philadelphia Hall of Fame (2003)
- City of Philadelphia Proclamation by Mayor John Street for Outstanding Contribution to Philadelphia Jazz (2007)
- U.S. House of Representatives Proclamation by Congressman Chaka Fattah for Outstanding Contribution by a Pennsylvania Resident to Jazz (2007)
- Inducted into the Philadelphia Music Walk of Fame (2017)

== See also ==
- Jazz Bridge
- Hal Jackson
- Yvonne Daniels
- Joseph Deighton Gibson Jr.
- Lavada Durst
- Daddy-O Daylie
- Black-appeal stations
