= Debi B. Jackson =

American radio personality (born 1950)

Debi B Jackson
- Born: Deborah Elaine White; 22 September 1950 (age 76); Harlem, New York, USA
- Occupation: On Air Radio Personality
- Years active: 1986–2015
- Spouses: Adrian Lawrence Bolling (m. 1968; div. 1976) Hal Jackson (m. 1987; died 2012)
- Children: Tonya Marie Bolling
- Presenting career
- Show: Sunday Classics
- Station: WBLS FM – New York

Debi B Jackson (born September 22, 1950), is an American on-air radio personality, professionally known as Debi B, co-host of Sunday Classics on WBLS FM NY from 1986 until 2015. Sunday Classics was the longest running broadcast show in the country.

== Biography ==
=== Early years ===
Jackson was born in Harlem, New York to parents Alex and Bernice White. At age 11 the family moved to the Bronx, New York. Jackson graduated from Central Commercial High School in June 1968 and attended Fordham University in the Bronx, where she studied Liberal Arts. Jackson's background was in Human Resources and worked at Fairleigh Dickinson University.

=== Career ===
In 1986, Jackson became an on-air radio personality co-hosting the "Hal Jackson's Sunday Classics" radio broadcasting program on WBLS FM, NY, along with radio personality Hal Jackson, who started the Sunday Classics program. Jackson first worked with Hal Jackson answering telephone calls and announcing contest winners on air. She soon began co-hosting the show making a name for herself within the industry. In 1987, Jackson married Hal Jackson after dating for six years.

Jackson and Hal, were on-air together at Sunday Classics for 25 years until his death in May 2012. Jackson continued on with a new name and co-host, Sunday Classics with Debi B., and Clay Berry (who was the executive producer). The broadcast ended in 2015 after almost 30 years on-air.

On April 27, 2026, Jackson inducted Melba Moore into the Atlantic City Walk of Fame presented by, The National R&B Music Society at Brighton Park. Tavares, Sister Sledge, Billy Paul, Black Ivory and Roy Ayers were also inducted as part of the 2026 Class.

=== Personal life ===
Jackson's life after radio is filled with non-profit work, and photography. In addition, Jackson is keeping her late husband's legacy alive by curating a visual journey exhibit, "The House That Jack Built: Hal Jackson, the Godfather of Black Radio – A Photo Retrospective”. It opened at Bergen Performing Arts Center in Englewood, NJ in 2025.

Jackson is on the selection committee for The Atlantic City Walk of Fame.

Jackson resides in Englewood Cliffs, New Jersey.
