= Hal Jackson =

Disc jockey and radio personality (1915–2012)

- Born: Harold Baron Jackson; 3 November 1915; Charleston, South Carolina, USA
- Died: 23 May 2012 (aged 96); New York, New York, USA
- Children: Harold B. Jackson Jr.; Jewell Jackson McCabe; at least 1 other
- Presenting career
- Show: Sunday Classics
- Station: WBLS – New York KGFJ/ KUTE – Los Angeles
- Country: United States
- Previous shows: The Bronze Review; WINX-Washington, D.C. The House That Jack Built; WOOK-Washington, D.C.

Harold Baron Jackson (3 November 1915 – 23 May 2012) was an American disc jockey and radio personality who broke a number of color barriers in American radio broadcasting.

== Biography ==
=== Early years ===
Jackson was born in Charleston, South Carolina, the fifth child of Eugene and Laura Jackson; his father was a tailor. His parents died when he was young, and he grew up in Washington, D.C., where he was raised by relatives; he attended Howard University, but did not get a degree.

=== Career ===
Jackson began his career as a sportswriter, covering local and national black sporting events for the Washington DC Afro-American. In the 1940s, he became one of the first African American radio sports announcers, broadcasting Howard's home baseball games and the Homestead Grays Negro league baseball games.

In 1940, he became the first African American host at WINX in Washington with The Bronze Review, a nightly interview program. He later hosted The House That Jack Built, a program of jazz and blues on three Washington radio stations (WINX, WANN, and WOOK),

Jackson first moved to New York City in November 1949, when he was hired by station WLIB, which wanted to expand the amount of black programming it offered. By 1954, he became the first radio personality to broadcast three daily shows on three different New York stations. Four million listeners tuned in nightly to hear Jackson's mix of music and conversations with jazz and show business celebrities.

In 1971, Jackson and Percy Sutton, a former Manhattan borough president, co-founded the Inner City Broadcasting Corporation (ICBC), which acquired WLIB — becoming the first African-American owned-and-operated station in New York. The following year, ICBC acquired WLIB-FM, changing its call letters to WBLS ("the total Black experience in Sound"). As of the late 2000s ICBC, of which Jackson was group chairman, owns and operates stations in New York; San Francisco; Philadelphia; Pittsburgh; Fort Lauderdale; Columbia, South Carolina; and Jackson, Mississippi. The flagship station was hampered by its frequency, sharing it with WOWO of Fort Wayne, Indiana. After being turned down by the FCC to change frequencies, Inner City Broadcasting, in an industry unprecedented move, purchased WOWO solely to reduce its output and upped the power of the NYC transmitters to 50,000 watts daytime/30,000 watts night, and subsequently be heard full-time across the entire New York market.

As of February 2011, nonagenarian Jackson continued to host Sunday Classics on WBLS each Sunday from 3 to 6 p.m., with Clay Berry and Deborah Bolling Jackson, known professionally as Debi B., his wife. of 25 years.

In 1990, Hal Jackson was the first minority inducted into the National Association of Broadcaster's Hall of Fame. In 1995, he became the first African-American inducted into the National Radio Hall of Fame. In 2001 the Broadcast and Cable Hall of Fame inducted Jackson. For over 11 years he hosted a radio program rated No. 1 by Arbitron in its time slot on 107.5 WBLS in New York, the Hal Jackson Sunday Morning Classics. He was given a Pioneer Award by the Rhythm and Blues Foundation in 2003. In October 2010 he was named a "Giant in Broadcasting" by the Library of American Broadcasting. Jackson was also inducted into the Guinness Book of World Records as being the oldest broadcaster, with a record 73-year career.

Jackson was the founder of the Hal Jackson Talented Teens International Competition.

=== Death ===
Jackson died of natural causes in New York City on 23 May 2012, with his wife Debi B and three children at his bedside at the age of 96. He often signed off the air with the motto; reminding listeners, "It's nice to be important, but it's important to be nice."

== Awards ==
- Candace Award, National Coalition of 100 Black Women, 1992
- 1990, Hal Jackson was honored with being the first Black (or minority) inducted into the NAB Broadcasting Hall of Fame
- 1995, Hal Jackson was the first Black inducted into the Radio Hall of Fame at the Museum of Broadcast Communications

== See also ==
- African American firsts
- Frankie Crocker
- Yvonne Daniels
- Imhotep Gary Byrd
- Kool DJ Red Alert
- Bob Perkins
- Vaughn Harper
- Lavada Durst
- Joseph Deighton Gibson Jr.
- Black-appeal stations
- WERD (Atlanta)

== Sources ==
- James Haskins, Hal Jackson The House that Jack Built – My life as a trailblazer in broadcasting and entertainment, Ed. Amistad; New York 2001
- Evangelos Andreou, Hal Jackson – Wow!!! 25th Anniversary. "EI" Magazine of European Art Center (EUARCE) of Greece, Issue 10, 1995 p. 13, 40–41
