= Suzanne Cloud =

American singer, writer and teacher (born 1951)

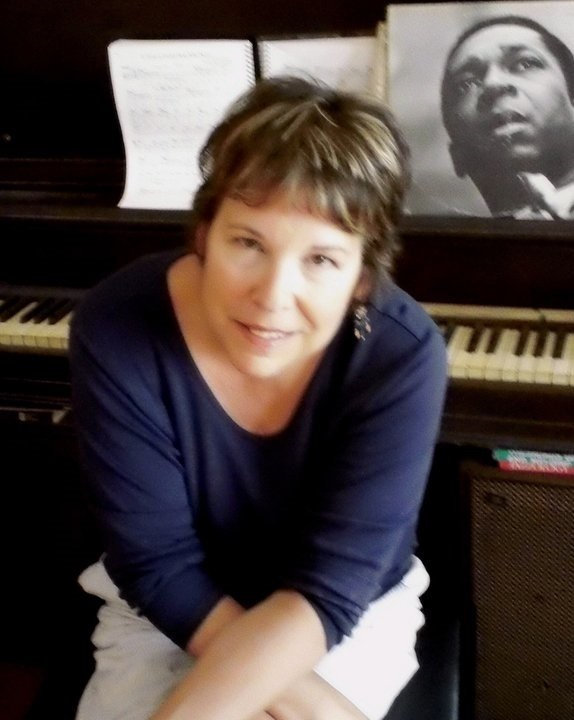

Background information
- Born: Suzanne Raynor Dunkle; September 7, 1951 (age 75); Philadelphia, Pennsylvania, U.S.
- Genre: Jazz
- Occupation: Singer
- Years active: 1980–present
- Label: Dreambox
- Website: suzanne.cloud

Suzanne Cloud (born September 7, 1951) is an American jazz singer, writer, and teacher.

== Biography ==
Born in Philadelphia, Cloud grew up in a musical family in Pennsauken Township, New Jersey. Her father played the ukulele and banjo, while her mother sang. During her time at Pennsauken High School, Cloud studied piano and participated in musicals. After graduating, she attended nursing school at Methodist Hospital in Philadelphia. She also appeared in regional productions of The Pajama Game and Bell, Book, and Candle. Cloud received a bachelor's degree from Rutgers University–Camden and earned both a master's and doctorate from the University of Pennsylvania.

In the mid-1970s, Cloud was hired as the lead singer for the disco band Autumn. She recorded jingles for banks, retail stores, and other businesses, including "Come Fly with Me" for the Playboy Casino in Atlantic City, New Jersey. By 1980, she began focusing more on jazz while collaborating with producer and arranger Richie Rome. In 1982, she started working with pianist Eddie Green, performing jazz in hotels in Philadelphia, casinos in Atlantic City, and neighborhood jazz clubs. Her debut album, I Like It, was released by Encounter Records in 1986.

Cloud has served as the director of the Philadelphia Jazz Legacy Project, an archival initiative, and was the founding executive director of Jazz Bridge, an organization incorporated in 2005 with a friend, jazz singer Wendy Simon, to support local jazz and blues musicians in crisis. For PIFA 2016, she initiated Last Call at the Downbeat featuring a new composition by saxophonist Bobby Zankel and his Warriors of the Wonderful Sound jazz orchestra alongside students from Grover Washington Jr. Middle School at the Kimmel Center.

Cloud is the editor of The Real Philadelphia Book, 2nd edition with over 300 jazz and blues compositions by Philadelphia musicians. She also wrote a musical about Dizzy Gillespie's early years in Philadelphia for the Philadelphia International Festival of the Arts in 2014.

== Awards and honors ==
- Named a Creative Connector by the Philadelphia Leadership Council in 2012 and featured by WHYY-FM
- Received a grant in 2016 from The Pew Center for Arts & Heritage to present the Philadelphia Real Book Concerts: New Music in Jazz and Blues, This series of concerts helped stimulate city's jazz community and expanded the Jazz Bridge Neighborhood Concerts established by Cloud in Collingswood, New Jersey in 2004.
- Named a Philadelphia Jazz Hero, Jazz Journalists Association, 2019

== Discography ==
=== As leader ===
- I Like It (Encounter, 1986)
- With a Little Help from My Friends (Dreambox Media, 1996)
- Looking Back (Dreambox Media, 2001)

=== As guest ===
- Denis DiBlasio, Reflections of Childhood (Dreambox Media, 1997)
- Denis DiBlasio, Rhino (Dreambox Media, 2000)
- Jim Miller, If It's Not One Thing... (Dreambox Media, 2004)
