= Nevada Broadcasters Association =

Broadcasters' trade association

The Nevada Broadcasters Association (NVBA) is a trade association for radio and television broadcast stations in the U.S. state of Nevada.

It seeks to educate consumers about the impending change to digital television broadcasting in Nevada and the rest of the United States.

The NVBA seeks to influence Nevada's local, state and federal officials together with other community leaders about broadcasting issues, concerns and challenges.

Together with the National Association of Broadcasters and the National Alliance of State Broadcasters Associations, the NBA participates in Federal Communications Commission proceedings.

The NVBA sponsors a Washington Legal Hot Line for quick legal advice for stations from a Washington law firm, as well as a Carson City Hot Line for stations and an Engineer's Hot Line.

They also sponsor an FCC Alternative Broadcast Inspection Program for stations. As Nevada's Voice for Homeland Security, the NVBA is at the forefront in the ongoing strengthening of the Nevada Emergency Alert System and in the development of in-station Emergency Management Planning.

It coordinates emergency alerts and Amber alerts, and encourages ethnic and gender diversity in broadcasting. It seeks to preserve the history of Nevada broadcasting, and sponsors a hall of fame.
