= The All-Negro Hour =

American broadcast show

The All-Negro Hour was an American broadcast show that was the first radio program to feature an exclusively African American cast of performers. This sixty-minute variety show was created and hosted by Jack L. Cooper who was known as the first African American radio broadcaster. The All-Negro Hour first premiered on November 3, 1929, on World Stage Battery Company (WSBC), a white-owned radio station in Chicago, and ran until 1935. The program aired on WSBC’s “ethnic appeal” station every Sunday night at 5 p.m. The “ethnic appeal” station was owned by Joseph Silverman, a battery manufacturer, who sold time on WSBC to individuals who were looking to appeal to a specific ethnic group. With the success starting from the program, The All-Negro Hour, Cooper is considered to be the creator of "black appeal", otherwise known as black radio.

== Origin ==
Early American radio broadcasting consisted of white-run and owned stations catering to audiences that were predominately white. Black representation existed minimally throughout programming and ceased to exist within spaces of ownership and management in radio broadcasting. This was due to the institutionalized racism that continually discouraged any black individuals from being able to invest in radio or purchase air time. In the 1920s, networks began to incorporate sponsored programming on the air for black audiences, but comedy radio shows consisted almost entirely of minstrelsy – the act of white performers stereotyping black culture through a variety of different racist acts.

Jack L. Cooper started his career in a well-loved African American vaudeville before becoming a journalist for black newspapers across the country. Eventually he became an assistant theater editor at the Chicago Defender where he wrote his own weekly column titled “Coop’s Chatter." This position allowed him an opportunity with WCAP in Washington D.C. where he was hired on a radio show as a black writer and performer. The show was produced for white audiences and required Cooper to participate in scriptwriting and acting that specifically stereotyped African American culture through minstrel-style performances as this was considered to be of public interest at the time. It was because of this show that Cooper made the move back to Chicago where he connected with Joseph Silverstein who was the owner of WSBC, an “ethnic appeal” radio. The idea was to create The All-Negro Hour, a radio program specifically for black audiences by black creators and performers. Silverstein was the only station owner that took interest in his show and agreed to air it on November 3, 1929. The show featured exclusively black guests, performers, actors, musicians, and comedians. With the creation of The All-Negro Hour, Cooper set the stage for black radio, referring to himself as one of the "first four Negroes in radio."

== Content evolution ==
Cooper created The All-Negro Hour with the black community in mind as American broadcast radio programming in the 1920s looked to entertain a predominantly white audience. The show consisted of comedy skits, musical numbers, and serial dramas. Featuring many popular guests who participated in live performances of skits or music, The All-Negro Hour gained much success. Although much of the content was comedic, there were segments of religion that Cooper featured such as live broadcasts of Sunday black church services in the Chicago area. In doing this, The All-Negro Hour audience expanded with support from the black clergy and their congregations.

The format of The All-Negro Hour continued to change as other radio shows such as Amos 'n' Andy and Beulah began gaining popularity across the country. Similar to the comedic strips in Amos ‘n’ Andy, Cooper created The All-Negro Hour: Luke and Timber and two other serial comedies in which he wrote, produced, and played a part in. The comedic skits within the serials followed the same characters each week. The content of the show was focused on communicating authentic black comedy through the writing of a black entertainer and through an exclusively black cast which was something that had yet to be seen on American broadcast radio.

In 1932, Cooper expanded The All-Negro Hour to the disc-jockey format by playing prerecorded music on the air in place of live music. Eventually, all live music and skits were replaced by pre-recorded tracks and Cooper became one of the first broadcasters to talk in between them, leaning into that of American DJing by adding his personality and voice into the content.
