= Jazz Bridge =

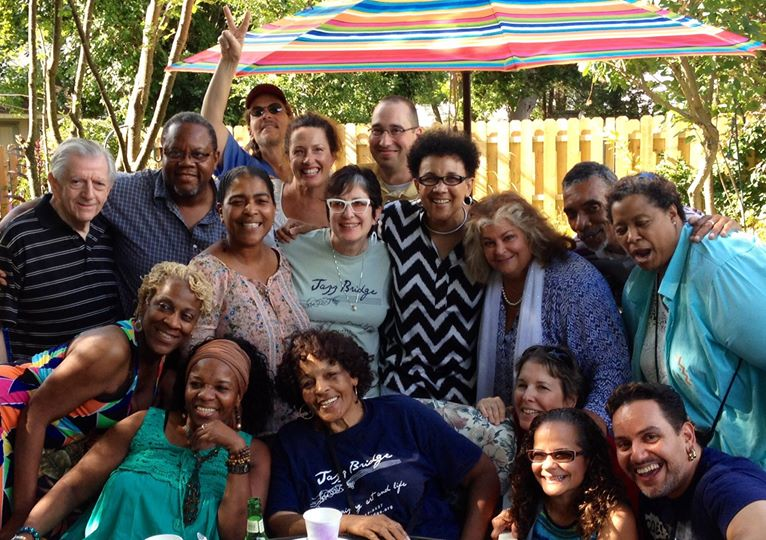
Noted artists and volunteers at a Jazz Bridge party

Jazz Bridge is an arts services organization that was unofficially founded in 2004 by jazz singers Suzanne Cloud and Wendy Simon to address the lack of support for individual jazz and blues musicians and vocalists in crisis in the tri-state, lower Philadelphia metropolitan area. Over the years, these women had witnessed the struggles of their fellow musicians and the desperation felt by the music community when the only available remedy to hardship was the traditional jam session to raise money. Seeking a more permanent support system, Simon and Cloud began to assemble like minded musicians and fans to form The Jazz Bridge Project, the organization's official name. Jazz Bridge saw a special opportunity to develop a unique, regional model that could provide local jazz and blues musicians/vocalists with no-cost or low-cost resources to support their activities of daily living—medical, financial, and professional—during times of personal crisis.

Jazz Bridge was awarded its 501(c)(3) status as a nonprofit by the IRS in 2007 and the members of the founding board of directors were: Singers Suzanne Cloud and Wendy Simon; Sue Ford, jazz concert producer; Bob Perkins, jazz historian and NPR deejay; Pete Souders, owner of Ortliebs' JazzHaus; bassist Mike Boone; The Tonight Show music director Kevin Eubanks. Board members have included Chris Sanchirico, Carol Rogers, Jeff Duperon, Rhenda Fearrington, Mike Boone, Wendy Simon, Jim Miller, and Bob Perkins.

Since its inception Jazz Bridge has won awards from the Philadelphia community: the Pennsylvania Humanities Council awarded Jazz Bridge "Partner of the Year" in 2013 and in 2014, the organization received the David Cohen Prize for Arts and Social Justice from the Philadelphia City Council. Executive Director Suzanne Cloud has also received the Martin Luther King Jr. Freedom Medal from the Camden County Freeholders and the Rutgers Chancellor Award for Civic Engagement for her work with Jazz Bridge. Filmmaker Jason Fifield of Slife Productions, and a former board member, won Best Short Form Jazz Video from the Jazz Journalists of America in 2014 for his work on Bob Perkins.

== Programs ==
Jazz Bridge presents over 48 neighborhood concerts throughout the Philadelphia metropolitan area every year from October through May in Collingswood, Willingboro, Philadelphia, Rosemont, and Cheltenham.

Jazz Bridge also aids Philadelphia-area professional jazz and blues musicians and singers in crisis, e.g. Charlie Rice when he was wrongly accused of stealing gas and guitarist Monnette Sudler when she needed a lung transplant.

Jazz Bridge has also been funded for special projects such as Philly Jazz: A View Through the Lens, a photography show by the city's best jazz photographers at the Kimmel Center of the Performing Arts, and an original musical, one man show - Last Call at the Downbeat - written and directed by Suzanne Cloud about Dizzy Gillespie's youthful sojourn in Philadelphia with musical direction by trumpeter Dwayne Eubanks for the Philadelphia International Festival of the Arts in 2013 at the Society Hill Playhouse. Jazz Bridge also partnered with Life Line Coalition to create a new Great Day in Philly group jazz photo taken by photographer Elena Bouvier with Mayor Michael Nutter in front of the John Coltrane House to raise money to rehabilitate the former home of the jazz great.
