= Joseph Deighton Gibson Jr. =

American radio disc jockey

- Born: Joseph Deighton Gibson Jr. May 13, 1920; Chicago, U.S.
- Died: January 30, 2000 (aged 79); Las Vegas, NV
- Education: Lincoln University (B.A.)
- Occupations: Actor, disc jockey, rapper
- Notable credit: The Family Affair Black Radio Announcers Convention

Joseph Deighton Gibson Jr. (May 13, 1920 – January 30, 2000) was an American radio disc jockey and actor. He is regarded as the father of the Black appeal radio format.

To his peers in radio his nickname was "Jockey Jack," and he achieved renown for his annual Black radio convention, where he was known as Jack the Rapper, for an all-inclusive Black/urban music showcase and convention. He is listed in the Nevada Broadcasters Association Hall of Fame. In 1989, he was inducted into the Black Radio Hall of Fame.

== Biography ==
Gibson attended Lincoln University in Jefferson City, Missouri, from 1940 to 1942, earning a bachelor's degree in science. He began his career in radio under the wing of Al Benson, one of radio’s legends, a jive-patter-talking disc jockey (DJ) of the Be-Bop school at Chicago’s WJJD.

Benson, the ‘Old Swingmaster’ (born Arthur Bernard Leaner in 1920 in Jackson, Mississippi) as he was known, had come to radio in 1943 as a pastor, but was prohibited from selling airtime, so he switched to become a secular DJ, and mentored some of the Black DJ’s at WGES and WJJD. He rapidly rose to fame in Chicago, Illinois, playing swing and Be-Bop jazz. His phenomenal appeal was due to the Black jive talk he peppered between songs. He was the first DJ to speak with a Black southern accent, and frequently used ‘street slang’. He came to this by way of his previous employment with the Works Progress Administration as an interviewer. His bond with the Black migrants to northern cities was from his ‘mushmouth,’ as the first Black radio ‘personality jock.’ He was the first to play hit urban blues records on air, and with success at selling airtime, the station became immensely popular. When Jack Gibson came to work for him at WJJD a bell rang, and thus was born the idea of Black appeal radio. 'Jockey Jack' was born here. In publicity stills, Gibson was pictured straddling a microphone and turntable in jockey silk outfits, and he gained a following playing to a Black audience.

Also he had parts in the anthology Destination Freedom, a series written by Richard Durham, dedicated to the retelling the lives of notable Negros in the Americas. In 1949, Gibson left WJJD to found a new station, WERD in Atlanta, Georgia. WERD was the first radio station to be owned by a Black person, and the first voice heard on it was ‘Jockey Jack.’ He and Jesse Blayton Jr. flipped the switch on a money-losing big-band station. The station played the new Rhythm and Blues (R&B)—a mix of gospel vocal styles, swing-band instrumentals, and electrified urban blues which Benson had helped to popularize after WWII. R&B was outselling jazz in the Black music market but had little traction on-air as DJs at other Black-themed stations did not play it, preferring the then-popular big-band format. The use of ‘back home’ street patter and R&B music was popular with the youth culture and was considered ‘gangsta’ and a bit obscene. Along with other Benson-inspired DJ’s, a new wave of rhyming and signifying African-American culture hit American urban centers on air, with boastful patter, the ‘dozens,’ and rhyming at the end of sentences which became de jure. The first to do that was a former Negro League baseball announcer named Lavada Durst, known as Doctor Hep Cat, who spieled rhyme that was not obscene and was the precursor to modern rap and hip-hop. There was also Holmes (Daddy-O) Daylie, the rapping bartender who did his entire show in rhyme. Daddy-O was responsible for the Be-Bop revolution in jazz vernacular, creating a hipster idiom that Be-Bop artist Dizzy Gillespie credits for popularizing with modern jazz lovers in the 1950s and 1960s.

=== "Jockey Jack" ===
Jumpin’ jills and jivin' cats,

Upstate Gates in Stetson hats,

Lace your boots and tighten your wig,

Here’s some jive, can you dig?

I'm Doctor Hep Cat, on the scene,

With a stack of shellac in my record machine,

I'm hip to the tip, and bop to the top,

I'm long time coming and I just won't stop.

—Doctor Hep Cat, KVET Austin, 1948

Durst published a pamphlet called “The Jives of Doctor Hep Cat”, which included his radio rhymes and a dictionary of “jive talk.” For much of the 1950s and well into the 1960s Doctor Hep Cat ruled the late-night in Austin, Texas. These DJs did not assimilate the culture; they were populists, broadcasting music and speech that Black folk used in the street. This set the stage for the birth of Black appeal radio stations in the post-war era of swing and Be-Bop. When Hal Jackson (Inner City Broadcasting Corporation head) entered mass-market radio he put his own stamp on Black radio, one that eschewed fast-talking jive, and with WWRL he found greater audiences broadcasting in the smoother patter of the inner city. When his station WLIB purchased WBLS and FM radio audiences came to understand there was more to music than top-40, disc jockeys like Frankie Crocker and his urban contemporary cohorts Johnny 'The Duke' Allen, Vaughn 'Quiet Storm' Harper, and Ken ‘Spider’ Webb went from just some ‘jive turkeys’ to number one in their market, then to the number-one radio station in the country.

Gibson would go on the air in his "Jockey Jack" persona, wearing real silks, playing bugle calls from the track Kentucky-derby style, talking about ‘riding the hits.’ (During 1951–1953, both Gibson and Dean were working at WLOU Louisville, Kentucky, home of the Kentucky Derby.) The year 1953 found him as program director at WMBM, and then at WFEC. The following year he was back at WERD.

=== Mello Yello ===
In 1955, Gibson founded the National Association of Radio Announcers for Black DJs. In the 1960s it was renamed the National Association of Television and Radio Announcers (NATRA). Bringing together disparate elements of Black Appeal Radio under one body placed Gibson at the head of the table, and as the father he declared, "I slapped this baby's bottom and brought it to life!"

In 1963 Gibson joined the staff of Motown records as a public-relations (PR) manager. While there, he mentored the Supremes, Marvin Gaye, The Jackson Five, and Stevie Wonder, and as Director of International PR, he often provided their first introductions to the public on stage. In 1969 he moved to STAX records, where he remained until 1972. In 1976 he began publication of a two-sided trade pamphlet called "Mello Yello," about the radio industry.

"Jack the Rapper's Mello Yello" is the oldest and largest-circulated Black radio/music trade publication in America.

=== Activism ===
In 1985 Gibson was involved with the effort to un-ban Stevie Wonder, whose records were banned in South Africa after his acceptance of an Academy award in the name of Nelson Mandela. Some 230 radio stations joined his call to salute the singer/songwriter on his birthday. In 1986 Gibson was honored by the Smithsonian Institution for his work promoting Black radio.

In 1987, after learning that soul singer Jackie Wilson had been buried next to his mother in an unmarked grave, Gibson launched a crowd-sourced fundraiser for a marker and tomb for the pair. A prisoner in Kansas donated 50 cents, and by May donations were estimated at $10,000, often donated in $1 increments, to build a mausoleum and headstone with the inscription, "And now, no more lonely teardrops" for the singer.

=== Family Affair ===
The Jack the Rapper Family Affair was a recurring event where influential people in Black urban radio gathered and listened to what record companies had to offer. Performing live could launch a new act's career, and affirmed the viability of older, established musicians like Prince and Whitney Houston. When the rap genre emerged in the 1980s and 1990s, up-and-coming acts flocked to the Family Affairs, confusing the name "Jack the Rapper" and also attracting an element that caused hotel venues to rethink their relationship with Gibson's affairs.

By the third year, the Family Affair had outgrown Colony Square, so it was moved to Peachtree Plaza in 1979 and 1980. "After that we moved to the Marriot," Gibson later noted.

Gibson relocated the 1994 Family Affair from Atlanta to Orlando, Florida, to deter incidents that had marred recent conferences. It had grown to over 5,000 attendees and claimed an annual $13.8 million influx of business to Atlanta. People who wanted to hobnob with celebrities were buying tickets on-site to party, and these crowds overwhelmed the venues and organizers alike.

A security issue also presented itself. There were many talented artists who started at a Family Affair who developed into superstars. There were seminars that gave people in the industry an opportunity to exchange ideas, and they often returned to their jobs equipped with fresh concepts, ready to make changes. But the show was over, and extra security failed to secure the venue. It was killed by the very acts Gibson had defended who brought the street to the "family friendly" upscale convention.

=== Death ===
Gibson died of prostate cancer on January 30, 2000, at age 79 in Las Vegas, Nevada.

== Personal life ==
Gibson was married to Sadye Gibson for 47 years; they had two children. She died in 1990. His second wife was Elsie Harris-Gibson.

== Legacy ==
In 1989, Gibson was inducted into the Black Radio Hall of Fame. In 1996, the entirety of Gibson's books, records, and photographs was donated to the Archives of African American Music and Culture at Indiana University. That year Gibson also was named to the Entertainment Committee for the 1996 Olympic Games in Atlanta. Gibson was inducted into the Nevada Broadcasting Hall of Fame in 1998.

== See also ==
- Archives of African American Music and Culture
- African American firsts
- Imhotep Gary Byrd
- Kool DJ Red Alert
- Bob Perkins
- Jocko Henderson
- Ed Castleberry
- Yvonne Daniels
- DJ Nat D.
- Jive
- Signifying Jive talk
