= WAEC (AM) =

Atlanta, Georgia; United States
- Broadcast area: Atlanta metropolitan area
- Frequency: 860 kHz

Ownership
- Owner: Beasley Broadcast Group; (Beasley Media Group Licenses, LLC)

History
- First air date: 1948
- Last air date: June 2024
- Former call signs: WERD (1948–1972); WXAP (1972–1978)

Technical information
- Licensing authority: FCC
- Facility ID: 22132
- Class: B
- Power: 5,000 watts day; 2,500 watts critical hours; 500 watts night
- Transmitter coordinates: 33.729323°N 84.32201°W

Links
- Public license information: Public file; LMS

WAEC (860 kHz) was an AM radio station in Atlanta, Georgia, The station was owned by Beasley Broadcast Group, Inc., through licensee Beasley Media Group Licenses, LLC. It operated from 1948 to 2024.

Originally a 1,000-watt daytime-only station, in the mid-1980s WAEC increased power to 5,000 watts, then was licensed for a 24-hour signal with 500 watts during nighttime hours and 2,500 watts during critical hours. The station used a non-directional antenna during daytime and critical hours, and a directional antenna system at night. The broadcast towers were located near the Flat Shoals Road exit of Interstate 20 in Atlanta.

== History ==
=== WERD ===
WERD was the first radio station owned and operated by African Americans. The station was established in Atlanta, Georgia, in 1948. Though WDIA in Memphis was on the air a year earlier carrying black-oriented programming, the station was not owned by African Americans.

Jesse B. Blayton Sr., an accountant, bank president, and Atlanta University professor, purchased WERD in 1949 for $50,000. He changed the station format to "black appeal" and hired his son Jesse Jr. as station manager. "Jockey" Jack Gibson was hired soon after, and by 1951 was the most popular DJ in Atlanta. The station was housed in the Masonic building on Auburn Avenue, then one of the wealthiest black neighborhoods in the United States. Located in that same building was the headquarters of the new Southern Christian Leadership Conference, led by Martin Luther King Jr. It has been said that Dr. King had his offices right under the radio station. A WERD staffer would let the microphone out the window to the first floor, and Dr. King would bring the microphone in his window and make a speech.

Blayton sold the station in 1968, and on January 3, 1972, its call sign was changed to WXAP.

=== WAEC ===
Logo as "Love 86"

The station briefly changed to country music in the late 1970s under new owner, Mike Sears, before becoming WAEC on December 3, 1978. The first station to play contemporary Christian music in Atlanta, its new call letters stood for "Atlanta's Electric Church".

Don Stone was hired as general manager a year later and changed the slogan to "Love 86". Stone built the station to be one of the most successful Christian stations in the country, and created several publications for the station including the Atlanta Christian Business Directory and the Love 86 Express newspaper. Stone stayed at the station until 1994, when he departed to focus on publishing the Atlanta Christian Business Directory and The Love 86 Express, now Atlanta Christian Magazine.

Sears sold the station to Tampa-based Forus Communications in 1982, who sold the station 20 years later to Beasley Broadcasting.

On November 15, 2023, WAEC changed formats from Christian talk to Spanish-language salsa music, branded as "Playa 860".

In June 2024, WAEC went silent after the land their broadcast tower was located on near I-20 and Flat Shoals Road was sold to a developer. The license was cancelled on September 3, 2025.
