= Dempsey Travis =

American entrepreneur

- Born: Dempsey Jerome Travis; February 25, 1920; Chicago, Illinois, USA
- Died: July 2, 2009 (aged 89)
- Education: Roosevelt University
- Notable credit(s): Don’t Stop Me Now; An Autobiography of Black Chicago; An Autobiography of Black Jazz; An Autobiography of Black Politics; The Victory Monument; I Refuse to Learn to Fail; Views From the Back of the Bus

Dempsey Travis (February 25, 1920 – July 2, 2009) was a real estate entrepreneur and civil rights activist who, later in life, became a prominent historian and author, writing extensively on African-American history, politics, social issues, and music.

== Early years and education ==
Dempsey Jerome Travis was born in 1920 in Chicago, IL, and served in the United States Army from 1942 to 1946, before earning his Bachelor of Arts degree from Roosevelt University in 1949.

== Businessman ==
As an entrepreneur, Travis sought to revitalize African-American neighborhoods in Chicago. Travis Realty Company, which he founded in 1949, and Sivart Mortgage Company, which he founded four years later, increased the availability of mortgages for African Americans. Together, the two companies worked to sell properties located in the Chicago area to African Americans who were being displaced by urban renewal projects. In 1961, Travis founded the United Mortgage Bankers of America and served as its president until 1974. During the late 1960s and early 1970s, Travis served on President Richard Nixon’s Housing Task Force and President Gerald Ford’s Task Force on Urban Renewal.

== Activist ==
Travis was also involved with the civil rights movement, and while serving as president of the NAACP Chicago chapter in 1959 he coordinated Martin Luther King Jr.'s first civil rights march in Chicago on July 24, 1960.

== Author ==
Travis’ career as an author began when he founded Urban Research Institute, later renamed Urban Research Press, in 1969. The Press was initially established to publish two studies on socioeconomic issues affecting urban African Americans, but later evolved into a literary press, publishing 21 of Travis’ books. Travis’s first book was the children’s book, Don’t Stop Me Now (1970). In 1981, he wrote An Autobiography of Black Chicago and became the first African-American author to have a book listed on the Chicago Tribune non-fiction bestsellers list. Travis would later publish An Autobiography of Black Jazz (1983) These three books exemplify Travis’ writing style, which weaves historical research and information gathered from in-depth interviews with biographical anecdotes. Travis also published An Autobiography of Black Politics (1987), The Victory Monument, I Refuse to Learn to Fail, and Views from the Back of the Bus.

== Honors and awards ==
Travis is listed in Who’s Who in America, Who’s Who in Finance and Industry, and Who’s Who in the World. He was also listed among the "People Who Have Made a Difference" by the Chicago Sun-Times and was one of Ebony’s "100 Most Influential Black Americans". He was also the subject of numerous television programs: five of these shows have received Emmy nominations. He also received Black Enterprise magazine’s "First Annual Finance Achievement Award" on February 21, 1975.

== Archival collections ==
The Dempsey Travis Papers exist in three locations: Roosevelt University Library, Chicago Public Library Vivian G. Harsh Research Collection, and Chicago History Museum. The papers showcase Travis’ career as an author, as opposed to his career as a real estate entrepreneur, and contain an extensive collection of interviews with prominent African-American figures in various fields including politics, business, and entertainment. The papers are arranged in series based on individual books, or subject of books, with the majority of series containing edited drafts, transcribed interviews, and general research.
