= Jack L. Cooper =

American DJ (1888–1970)

- Born: Jack Leroy Cooper; September 18, 1888; Memphis, Tennessee, United States
- Died: January 12, 1970 (aged 81); Chicago, Illinois, US
- Occupations: Radio presenter, broadcasting executive, vaudeville promoter and performer
- Known for: First African-American DJ and innovator in US radio

Jack Leroy Cooper (September 18, 1888 – January 12, 1970) was the first African-American radio disc jockey, described as "the undisputed patriarch of black radio in the United States." In 2012, he was inducted into the National Radio Hall of Fame.

== Biography ==
He was born in Memphis, Tennessee, one of ten children of William and Lavina Cooper. He left home at the age of ten to work in Cincinnati, Ohio, and in his teens was a successful boxer and semi-professional baseball player. By 1905, he was working in vaudeville on the Theater Owners Booking Association (TOBA) circuit as a singer and dancer, and started writing and producing sketches and stage shows, soon running his own touring troupe with his first wife. He managed at least two theaters for TOBA, and began writing for newspapers in Memphis and Indianapolis.

After moving to Chicago around 1920, he began writing theater reviews for the Chicago Defender, while attempting to break into the new radio industry as a performer. While working for the Defender in Washington, D.C. he first appeared on radio, writing and performing comic sketches on station WCAP. He returned to Chicago in 1926 and developed a proposal for a new show, The All-Negro Hour, which premiered on WSBC on November 3, 1929. The show was initially broadcast on a weekly basis, and contained live music and comedy sketches, but Cooper gradually modified and expanded its content. It became successful with both listeners and commercial sponsors and continued until 1936. By the mid-1930s, Cooper presented 9 1/2 hours each week on WSBC. He was one of the first, if not the first, to broadcast gramophone records, including gospel music and jazz, using his own phonograph. In 1938, he created a new show, Search for Missing Persons, designed to reunite listeners with family members who they had lost contact with. He turned the World Storage Battery Company into WSBC Southtown Studios, described as "the Only All-Negro Studios in the Nation." He also pioneered a mobile news team to cover items of interest to Chicago's black community.

By 1947, his production company Jack L. Cooper Presentations controlled about 40 hours per week on four different stations in Chicago. He promoted African Americans as presenters, and was among the first to broadcast commentaries on Negro league baseball games and news targeted at the black community. He also actively supported African-American youth organizations including the South Side Boy's Club. In contrast with later DJs like Al Benson, Cooper scrupulously avoided using slang expressions or broadcasting vaudeville or urban blues recordings:

"His announcing privileged standard American English over the black vernacular, a preference he shared with the most affluent and educated African Americans. In effect, Cooper and his team became the voice of the urban black bourgeoisie and a symbol of racial uplift."

Cooper retired from broadcasting in 1959, and died in Chicago in 1970 at the age of 81. In 1975, a park in the West Pullman neighborhood was officially named Cooper Park in his honor.
