= Nat D. Williams =

American journalist (1907–1983)

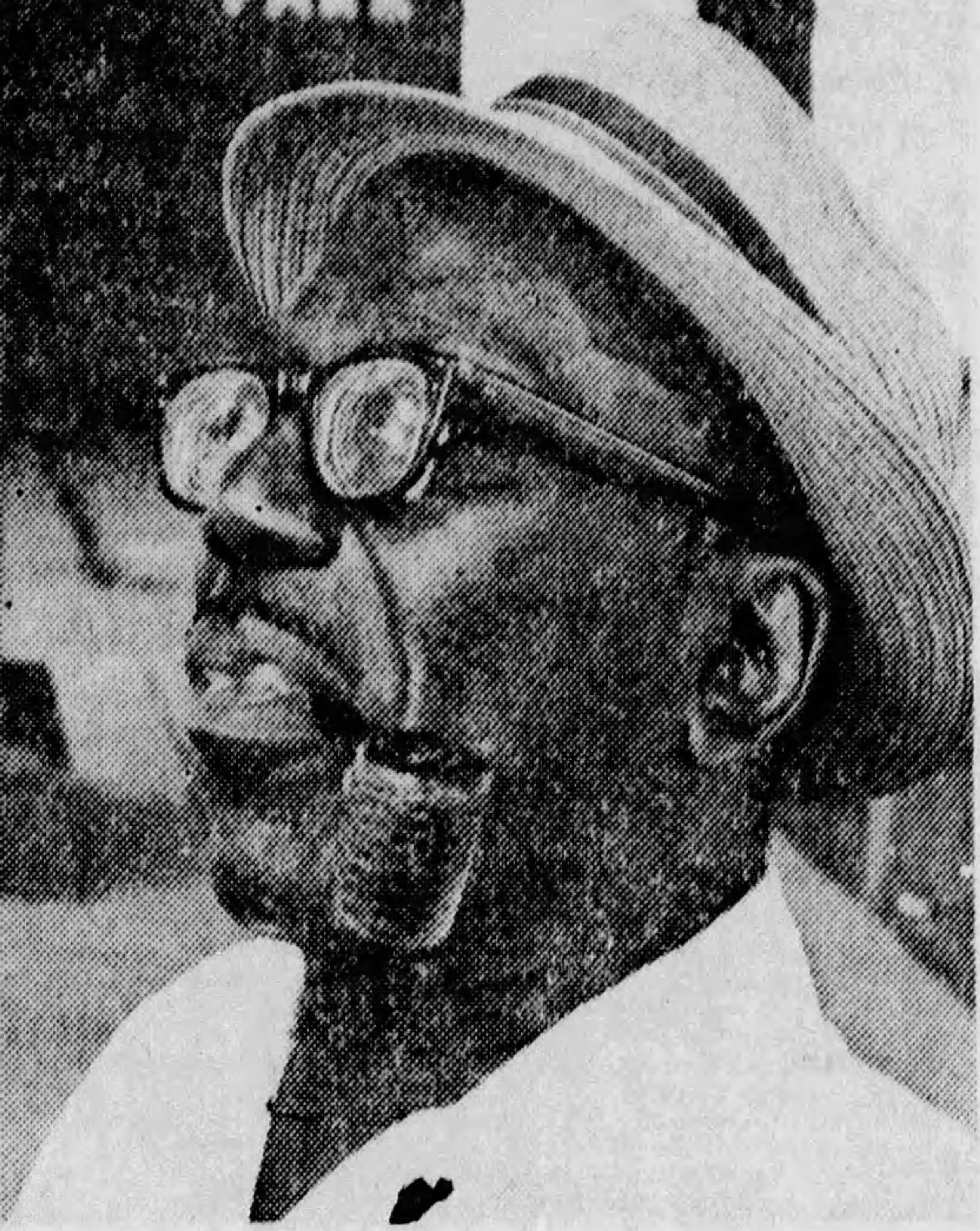
Williams in 1974

Nathaniel Dowd Williams (October 19, 1907 – October 27, 1983), known as Nat D. Williams or simply Nat D., was an American high school teacher, disc jockey on Black Appeal radio, journalist and editor. He was born on Beale Street in Memphis, Tennessee. Known for his jive patter on the air, Williams had 10% of African-Americans in the U.S. listening to his program and heralded the changing radio style which helped to create "Black appeal radio", which it turn led to the urban contemporary listening format of Black radio in the 1960s and '70s.

In 1948, Williams became the first African-American disc jockey in Memphis when he went on air for WDIA-AM. He is in the Memphis Music Hall of Fame and the Tennessee Radio Hall of Fame; and in 2017 was inducted into the National Rhythm and Blues Hall of Fame. There is a historical marker outside the former site of the Palace theatre on Beale Street where he was often master of ceremonies, placed there by the Tennessee Historical Commission.

== Early life and career ==
Born on Beale Street, then known as a jazz haunt in Memphis, he went to Nashville, earning both a bachelor's and a master's degrees at Tennessee State University, a public university and HBCU. He became a high school teacher at Booker T. Washington High School upon returning to Memphis in 1930. Since 1928 he had been an at-large journalist for Black newspaper Memphis World. Williams was also Master of Ceremonies for Amateur Night on Beale Street, officiating at a raucous roundup in 1935 at the Old Palace Theater.

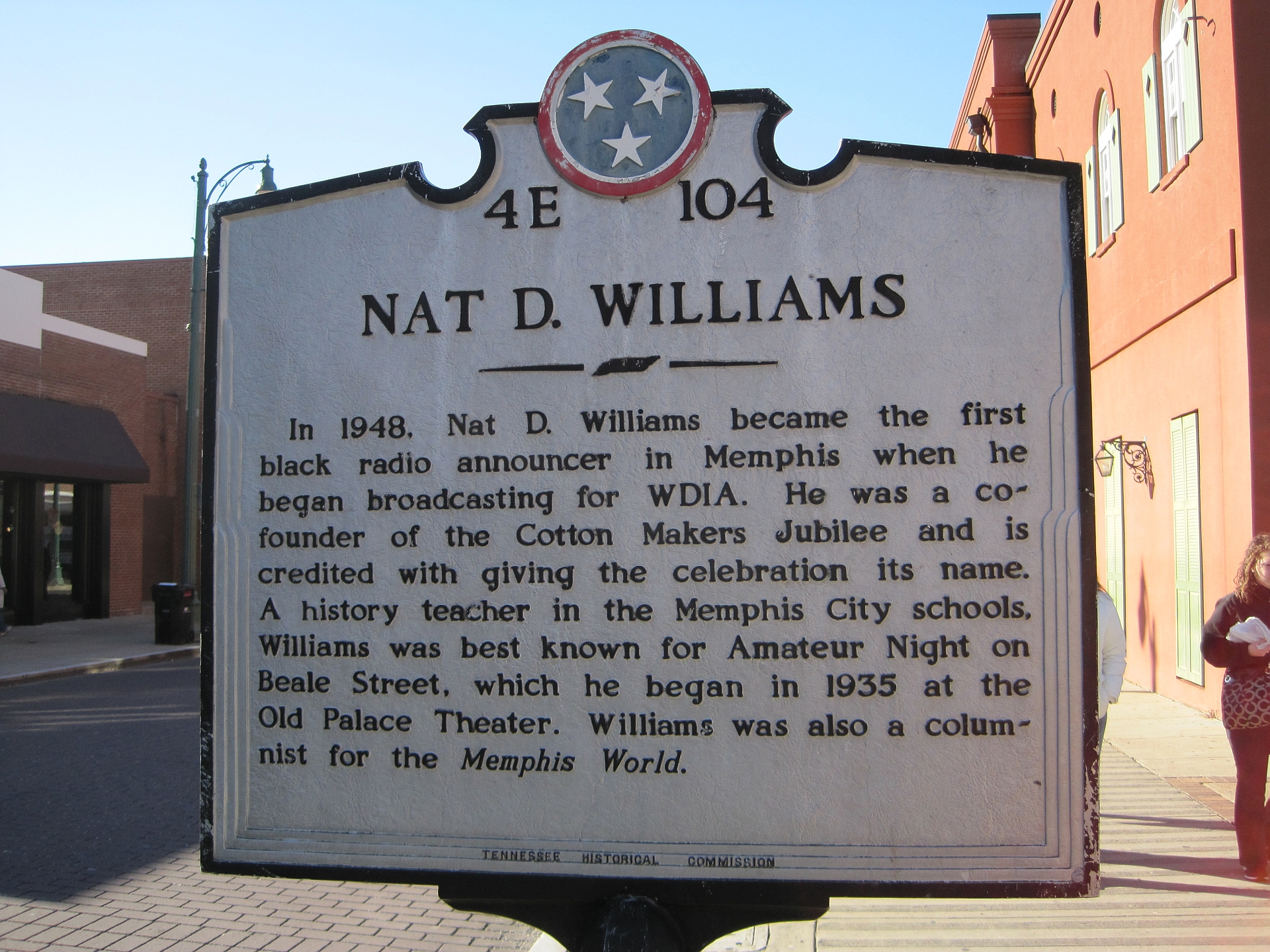
2011-01-08 Downtown Memphis TN 36

He was not known as a musician but rather as promoter, entertainer and mentor to Black youth. Rufus Thomas attended Booker T. Washington where he met Williams, a history teacher who schooled him in both academics and comedy routines and who, after graduation, brought Rufus in as his sidekick hosting Amateur Night at the Palace Theater. Another of his students, Judge Benjamin Hooks, went on to the state legislature and would later also head the NAACP.

In 1935 Williams was a co-founder with Dr. Ransom Q. Venson of the Cotton Makers Jubilee and is credited with naming the celebration on a historical plaque on Beale st. The depression era cotillion was Black-organized, with its Kings and Queens and Krewes, and continued thru the '90s, steadily losing the parades down Beale Street, the grand Memphis balls, the fireworks and the hurley burley of the midway, itself a bygone celebration of when the city was epicenter of the cotton crop. The Black court held the Jubilees, the white court a carnival, which survives to this day as the Memphis Carnival.

== WDIA-AM ==
A history teacher in the Memphis City schools for 42 years, Williams married and had three children while working as a teacher, disc jockey and impresario. He had a revue at the Old Palace Theater called Amateur Night on Beale Street. Two of the famous amateurs whom did not get the 'gong' but garnered audience approbation were Elvis Presley and Riley King, later known as B. B. King. The audience was harsh, reducing many in stature; if you could survive the unsympathetic crowds, your star would rise.

As a DJ at radio station WDIA and one of the first Black announcers to air from the segregated south, his Tan Town Jubilee was broadcast across the Mississippi Delta and reached both black and white audiences, introducing them to blues and gospel, mixed with the jazz and swing which the other ‘big band’ oriented ‘black’ (but white owned and programmed) did not play. His success caused the station's programming to change into an all-Black format. Before that there was still no such thing as a Black disc jockey openly promoted south of the Mason-Dixon line. Thus, in creating the new Memphis sound the station WDIA birthed Black programming which spread throughout the south and mid-west; as a result stations began hiring Black DJ's instead of using white announcers to program Black music and Black appeal radio was born.

In the 1950s both Rufus Thomas and Riley King were disc jockeys at WDIA. The advent of shellac records had begun to push out the live performances on the radio, as a market teens and young adults preferred the music of the jukeboxes. The jive patter sprinkled between the records was fresh and distinctly Black in origin on these upstart radio stations; contrary to expectations, this did not turn off the white audience, which in turn contributed to the rise of rock and roll music. The new Memphis sound peaked in the 1960s and '70s with Stax Records.

== Later career ==
As a journalist, his columns ran in various newspapers. One of them, Down on Beale, started in 1931; and on June 1, 1955, one column was announced into the Congressional Record. His Dark Shadows written under the pseudonym D. Natural ran from 1951 to 1971. In 1951, he joined the staff of a new Black newspaper, the Tri-State Defender, published in Memphis. The position was first city editor. The column A point of view began in 1966 and had a run in Black newspapers around the country.

At WDIA, he was a gatekeeper who watched for lyrics that were obscene to the station's audience and detrimental to Black radio. He was also a cultural historian Williams kept doing his afternoon show and never failed to appear for his shift. He went off the radio due to a stroke in 1972 and Rufus Thomas replaced him on air.

== Death and legacy ==
He died in 1983 and is buried in New Park Cemetery in Memphis.

His influence in 'jive' talk radio extended to WERD, which ran with the format under 'Jockey Jack' when the first Black-owned station made its debut in 1949. Elvis, Bobby Blue Bland, Rufus Thomas and Riley King all got their start on amateur night. Radio disc jockeys copied his format and Black appeal radio thrived. The Cotton Makers Jubilee was a Memphis institution annually for 30+ years. Williams was a history teacher that left a mark. Well, yes-siree, it's Nat Dee on the Jamboree, coming at thee on seventy-three (on the dial), WDIA. Now, whatchubet.

== See also ==
- African American firsts
- Doctor Hep Cat
- Jack the Rapper
- Frankie Crocker
- Bob Perkins
- Vaughn Harper
- Yvonne Daniels
- Glossary of jive talk
- Archives of African American Music and Culture
