= Jocko Henderson =

American radio disc jockey, businessman, and hip hop music pioneer (1918-2000)

Douglas Wendell "Jocko" Henderson
- Born: March 8, 1918; Baltimore, Maryland, U.S.
- Died: July 15, 2000 (aged 82); Philadelphia, Pennsylvania, U.S.
- Resting place: West Laurel Hill Cemetery, Bala Cynwyd, Pennsylvania, U.S.
- Occupation: Disc jockey

Douglas "Jocko" Henderson (March 8, 1918 – July 15, 2000) was an American radio disc jockey, businessman, and hip hop music pioneer. He was inducted into the Broadcast Pioneers of Philadelphia Hall of Fame in 2004.

== Early life ==
Henderson was born March 8, 1918, in Baltimore, Maryland. Both of his parents were teachers.

== Career ==
Henderson began his broadcast career in 1952 at Baltimore station WSID, and in 1953 began broadcasting in Philadelphia on WHAT. He hosted a show called Jocko's Rocket Ship Show out of New York radio stations WOV and WADO and Philadelphia stations WHAT and WDAS from 1954 to 1964, which was an early conduit for rock & roll. He was known for a distinctive style of rhythmic patter in his radio voice, which he had learned from a Baltimore deejay, Maurice "Hot Rod" Hulbert. This fast-talking jive was exemplary of the style of Black Appeal Radio, which emerged in the early 1950s after black urban stations switched to playing bebop. With a heavy reliance on rapping and rhyming, the double entendres and street slang were a hit with audiences. Henderson continued on the stations WDAS and WHAT until 1974, deejaying in Philadelphia and New York as well as hosting concerts in both cities and a TV music program in New York. In addition to Philadelphia, New York, and Baltimore, Henderson was also broadcast on stations in St. Louis, Detroit, Miami, and Boston.

In the 1950s and early 1960s it was common practice for record companies to lavish gifts on disc jockeys in exchange for airplay of their songs. This was known as "payola", and starting in 1959 it was the subject of Congressional hearings condemning the practice. New York disc jockey Alan Freed's career ended when he was convicted of two counts of commercial bribery. Wand, a subsidiary of Scepter Records, created greatest hits collections for Henderson called Jocko's Show Stoppers and Jocko's Rocket to the Stars. Scepter also gave him publishing rights to songs such as "Baby It's You" and "Will You Love Me Tomorrow", which he eventually sold to avoid suffering the same fate as Freed.

In 1978, Henderson made an unsuccessful bid for a seat in the United States House of Representatives in Pennsylvania's 2nd congressional district. He also made some early rap records, recording 12" singles for Philadelphia International and Sugar Hill Records. He continued deejaying on oldies stations into the 1990s. He died July 15, 2000, after a long battle with cancer and diabetes. He was interred at West Laurel Hill Cemetery in Bala Cynwyd, Pennsylvania.

== Legacy ==
The Broadcast Pioneers of Philadelphia inducted Henderson into their Hall of Fame in 2004.

In a 2013 interview, Questlove described Jocko Henderson as "unofficially the first MC" (adapting a jazz style of scat singing in the late disco era), and stated that he was a major influence on the earliest rap and hip-hop in Philadelphia in the late 1970s.

== Discography ==
- "A Little Bit Of Everything" (Wand Records 1961)
- "Rhythm Talk" (Philadelphia International, 1979)
- "The Rocketship" (Philadelphia International, 1979)
- "Everybody's Uptight (Trying to Get Their Money Right)" (Sugar Hill Records, 1983)
