= Dr. Hepcat =

Albert Lavada Durst (January 12, 1913 – October 31, 1995), known as Dr. Hepcat, was an American blues pianist, singer, and baseball commentator who became the first black radio DJ in Texas, influential in the spread of rhythm and blues and rock and roll music.

== Biography ==
Durst was born in Austin, Texas, and learned to play piano as a child. He grew up playing barrelhouse blues locally, and developing a talent for hip rhythmic jive talk, which won him a position as announcer at Negro league baseball games in Austin.

He was heard by radio station KVET manager John Connally, later the Governor of Texas. With the support of station owner Jake Pickle, he hired Durst to be the station's baseball commentator and first black disc jockey, in 1948. Naming himself "Dr. Hepcat", Durst's presentation made him successful with white as well as black radio listeners, and according to the Texas State Historical Association he "can be credited for introducing an entire generation of white Austin listeners to jazz, blues, and rhythm and blues." Pickle said of Durst: "[He] had a lingo all his own... A lot of people listened to Senator games solely for the pleasure of hearing Dr. Hepcat.... He was as good an entertainer as he was an announcer, and he became famous all over Austin...".

Durst also recorded for Uptown Records, a label owned by KVET program director Fred Caldwell, and managed a gospel music group, the Charlottes. He wrote the gospel song "Let's Talk About Jesus" for the Bells of Joy, and also published a dictionary of jive talk, The Jives of Dr. Hepcat, in 1953. The magazine Wax in 1978 credited him as one of the inventors of rock'n'roll radio. He was also responsible for bringing many prominent black entertainers to perform in Austin.

He retired from KVET in the early 1960s and was ordained as a minister at Mount Olive Baptist Church in 1965. He gave up performing for several years, returning to play the blues from the mid-1970s at festivals and other venues. From the mid-1940s until retiring in 1979, Durst also worked as director of athletics for the Rosewood Recreation Center in Austin.

He died in Austin in 1995.

== See also ==
- Hal Jackson
- DJ Nat D.
- Daddy-O Daylie
- Yvonne Daniels
- Joseph Deighton Gibson Jr.
- Black-appeal stations
- WERD (Atlanta)
- Glossary of jive talk
- Jive talk
