= WERD (Atlanta) =

First African-American owned and operated radio station

WERD was the first radio station owned and programmed by African Americans. The station was established in Atlanta, Georgia on October 3, 1949, broadcasting on 860 AM (later used by WAEC). The National Black Radio Hall of Fame Atlanta Chapter is reopening WERD which still exists at its birth location and will also include a historical museum with it after renovations of the facility are completed.

WERD in Atlanta was the first radio station owned and operated by African Americans. (WDIA in Memphis was on the air in 1948 doing black—or Negro as it was then called—programming, but the owners were not African American). Jesse B. Blayton Sr., an accountant, bank president, and Atlanta University professor, purchased WERD in 1949 for $50,000. He changed the station format to "black appeal" and hired his son Jesse Jr. as station manager. "Jockey" Jack Gibson was hired and by 1951 he was the most popular DJ in Atlanta. Ken Knight from Daytona Beach, Florida was also hired to come in as the station's first Program Director.

The station is still housed in the Prince Hall Masonic Temple building on Auburn Avenue, then one of the wealthiest black neighborhoods in the United States. Located in that same building was the headquarters of the Southern Christian Leadership Conference, formed in 1957, led by Martin Luther King Jr., and staffed by Ella Baker. According to Gibson, King would tap the ceiling of SCLC office (just below WERD) with a broomstick to signal he had an announcement to make. Gibson would then lower a microphone from the studio window to King at the window below.

WDIA, in Memphis, Tennessee, though white owned, had Nat D. Williams as part of the first radio station programmed entirely for African Americans, WERD had "Jockey Jack" Gibson, a friend of Blayton from Chicago. Blayton sold the station in 1968. Ken Knight purchased the callsign and took WERD to Jacksonville, Florida. He changed WRHC to WERD; until his death in 1973. For many years it was a gospel station there and the station decided to name the street WERD Radio Drive; as it is still named today.

== See also ==
- Archives of African American Music and Culture
