= Archives of African American Music and Culture =

Archives at Indiana University

The Indiana University Archives of African American Music and Culture (AAAMC), established in 1991, is a material repository covering a range of African American musical idioms and cultural expressions from the post-World War II era. The collections highlight popular, religious, and classical music, with genres ranging from blues and gospel to R&B and contemporary hip hop. The AAAMC also houses extensive materials related to the documentation of Black radio.

The purpose of the Archives of African American Music and Culture is to establish a unique primary and secondary source material collection of African-American music and culture where such materials are scarce or nonexistent, and to preserve and disseminate these materials for research and instructional purposes. In doing so, its mission is to provide these materials to the general public through outreach programs such as live performances, exhibitions, seminars, workshops, and summer music camps and to engage in collaborative research and creative projects with units at Indiana University as well as with state and national institutions and associations. In addition, AAAMC develops instructional multi-media materials such as websites, CD-ROM programs, and video documentaries related to various aspects of African American music and provides practical experience in archiving and preparation of materials for public use.

The AAAMC supports the research of scholars, students, and the general public worldwide by providing access to holdings which include oral histories, photographs, musical and print manuscripts, audio and video recordings, educational broadcast programs, and the personal papers of individuals and organizations concerned with Black music. The repository also encourages exploration of its collections and related topics through a variety of public events, print and online publications, and pedagogical resources.

== Directors ==
Date	Name
2017–Present	Dr. Tyron Cooper
2014–2016	Dr. Mellonee V. Burnim
1991–2014	Dr. Portia K. Maultsby

== Radio Repository ==
- Black-appeal stations
- Donated material
- Disc Jockeys
- Black Radio: Telling It Like It Was
- Ed Castleberry Collection
- Jocko Henderson Collection
- Jack Gibson collection
- Portia K. Maultsby Collection
- Skipper Lee Frazier Collection

== Genres ==
- Special Collections
- General Collections
- Black Radio
- Classical
- Hip Hop
- Music Industry
- Popular Music
- Religious Music
- Online Access
- Digital Exhibits

== Publications ==
=== Liner Notes ===
Liner Notes is AAAMC's annual newsletter. Issues are available online at Liner Notes

=== Black Grooves ===
Black Grooves is a monthly music review site hosted by the Archives of African American Music and Culture. Issues are available online at Black Grooves

== See also ==
- List of open-air and living history museums in the United States
