= Yvonne Daniels =

American radio host (1937–1991)

- Born: 16 September 1937; Jacksonville, Florida
- Died: 21 June 1991 (aged 53); Chicago, Illinois

Yvonne Daniels (September 16, 1937 – June 21, 1991) was an American radio host in Chicago from the 1960s to 1991. Daniels was a member of the first all-woman radio team in 1967 for WSDM and the first woman radio host for WLS in 1973. Daniels was posthumously inducted into the National Radio Hall of Fame in 1995.

== Early life and education ==
In 1937, Daniels was born in Jacksonville, Florida, a daughter of singer Billy Daniels. As a teenager, she began working as a singer and a R&B radio host. Daniels attended school at Stanton High School and Tuskegee University.

== Career ==
In 1956, Daniels worked for WOBS in Jacksonville, Florida. Daniels later left Florida to begin her Illinois radio career in East St. Louis, Illinois for WBBR at the beginning of the 1960s. In 1962, she was let go by WBBR and returned to WOBS. In the mid-1960s, Daniels moved to Chicago to become a host for WYNR before being hired to co-host a night show for WCFL in June 1965.

Daniels remained at WCFL until 1967 when she moved to WSDM. With WSDM, she was a part of the station's first all-woman radio team until 1972. The following year, Daniels became the first woman DJ for WLS in 1973. In 1982, Daniels was hired by WVON as a drive time radio host and was moved to the afternoon show in 1984 when WVON was renamed WGCI-AM. She remained at WGCI until 1989 when she became WNUA's morning host.

== Death ==
Daniels died from breast cancer on June 21, 1991, in Chicago, Illinois.

== Awards and honors ==
In 1991, a part of Dearborn Street Bridge in Chicago was named Yvonne Daniels Way after her death. In 1995, Daniels was posthumously inducted into the National Radio Hall of Fame.

== See also ==
- African-American firsts
- Hal Jackson
- Frankie Crocker
- Imhotep Gary Byrd
- Bob Perkins
- Vaughn Harper
- Lavada Durst
