= Black-appeal stations =

Before the development of the radio format called "Top 40" was born, "Black Appeal Stations" reinvigorated radio. By playing a specific group of songs aimed specifically at the young African American demographic, "Black Appeal Stations" helped keep radio alive. Many other radio stations soon began to employ the "Top 40" radio format, in which the vast majority found their stations to rise from the bottom to top of ratings in their markets.

By employing "Top 40" as a radio format, stations were also making a decision to target a niche in the listening audience rather than trying to appeal to everyone as they had done since the beginning. Thus, several different stations could engage in format radio that included songs that appealed to various niche audiences within a community. This strategy of marketing radio broadcasting was made clear and successful through the developments and maturation of early "Black Appeal Stations".

== History ==
As 1952 drew to a close, the world of broadcasting was a maelstrom of probes, experiments, deals, and adjustments. Everything was in flux due to losing audience and programs to television. In Chicago, Jack Cooper, a black DJ with a big band audience refused to play R&B as it was considered 'low life' and had 'suggestive lyrics' that were somewhat sexual due to the double entendres, the cultural connotations were that it was music your mother didn't let you listen to. The music of black appeal stations gained a popular and mostly black audience in 'juke' joints, jukeboxes, and record stores.

Radio, sensing disaster, looked for new functions. Some stations became "Negro Stations"; most of these were owned by whites but aimed at the African American "market" with various kinds of "Negro" music. WDIA Memphis claims to be the first black format radio station. Blues great B.B. King started his career as a disk jockey on the station programmed by Nat D. Williams with a rhythm and blues sound. But the station also featured discussion of race issues as experienced and viewed by black announcers.

The format was successful, and quickly spread to other stations in Birmingham, New Orleans, Nashville, Cincinnati, St. Louis, and Washington, D.C., among others. In 1949 only four stations aired a black appeal format. By 1952 there were around 200 such stations and by 1956 there were 400.

Some people thought radio should become the medium of intellectuals. One-time radio greats like Eddie Cantor and Paul Whiteman were disk-jockeys. Taboos had vanished; now at this time almost anything could be discussed on radio. But ratings still plunged, and major sponsors were ready and eager for the switch. As the comedian Fred Allen put it, "they were ready to abandon radio like the bones at a barbeque."

The nation began to flock to television. Bishop Fulton J. Sheen was placed into a weekly series against Milton Berle and his Texaco program. Information Please began to transition itself from radio into the realm of television. Another radio veteran, Walter Winchell, wearing his hat like a 1930's movie reporter, transitioned from radio as well and shouted out news insights with a gravelly voice. Edward R. Murrow and a young collaborator, Fred W. Friendly, had transformed their documentary radio series Hear It Now into See It Now.

As the audience for comedy, variety, and drama shifted toward television and away from radio, radio stations had to find a new way to attract an audience. Stations that had remained independent had been familiar with the answer for several years. That answer was found in the newly permitted freedom to play recorded music.

In the mid-1940s technology for the recording industry had advanced to the point that recorded music was equal to or better than live performances on radio. Therefore, radio stations were airing fewer and fewer live performers through the decade with more airtime being devoted to records. Network affiliates had to fill more and more airtime on their own, and they too began to turn to recorded music.

In the 1950s these new sounds from the recording industry began to find prominent airtime on the radio. This influence was in large part to Cleveland disc jockey Alan Freed, who developed a new term for the upbeat music that combined elements for rhythm and blues, gospel, and country. He called it Rock and Roll. This popular new music through the tremendous aid of "Negro Stations" or "Black Appeal Stations" soon was being played on numerous jukeboxes in young adult and teen hangouts.

== See also ==
- KUCB-FM (Iowa)
- WLAC
- WERD (Atlanta)
- WEDR
- WDIA
- Arthur Bernard Leaner
- Jack Gibson
- Daddy-O Daylie
- DJ Nat D.
- Glossary of jive talk
- Jive talk
- The All-Negro Hour
- Archives of African American Music and Culture
