= Jive talk =

African-American Vernacular English slang or vocabulary that developed in Harlem

Jive talk, also known as Harlem jive or simply Jive, the 'argot of jazz', jazz jargon, 'vernacular of the jazz world', slang of jazz, and 'parlance of hip' is an African-American Vernacular English slang or vocabulary that developed in Harlem, where "jive" (jazz) was played and was adopted more widely in African-American society, peaking in the 1940s.

In 1938, jazz bandleader and singer Cab Calloway published the first dictionary by an African-American, Cab Calloway's Cat-ologue: A "Hepster's" Dictionary, which became the official jive language reference book of the New York Public Library. In 1939, Calloway published an accompanying book titled Professor Cab Calloway’s Swingformation Bureau, which instructed readers how to apply the words and phrases from the dictionary. He released several editions until 1944, the last being The New Cab Calloway’s Hepsters Dictionary: Language of Jive. Poet Lemn Sissay observed that "Cab Calloway was taking ownership of language for a people who, just a few generations before, had their own languages taken away."

However, H. L. Mencken in The American Language defined jive as "an amalgam of Negro-slang from Harlem and the argots of drug addicts and the pettier sort of criminals, with occasional additions from the Broadway gossip columns and the high school campus".

Dan Burley's book Original Handbook of Harlem Jive was compiled and published in 1944 at the suggestion of Harlem poet Langston Hughes.

In 1953, Albert Lavada Durst published the Jives of Dr. Hep Cat, a collection of rhymes compiled when he was at KVET in Austin, where he did late night R&B. Besides referring to the music scene, much of the argot related to drugs, such as marijuana. Mezz Mezzrow gave this sample:

Second Cat: Hey Mezzie, lay some of that hard-cuttin' mess on me. I'm short of a deuce of blips but I'll straighten you later.
Mezzrow: Righteous, gizz, you're a poor boy but a good boy—now don't come up crummy.
Second Cat: Never no crummy, chummy. I'm gonna lay a drape under the trey of knockers for Tenth Street and I'll be on the scene, wearin' the green.

== Glossary ==
A hummer
Exceptionally good.
Alligator
A devotee of jazz or swing music. Perhaps alludes to sharp-dressing with alligator leather.
Beat up
Sad, uncomplimentary, tired.
Cat
A fellow or person, especially a cool person.
Chops
Refers to any musician's level of ability. Originates from the physical changes that occur in a brass player's mouth and lips. E.g., Dizzy Gillespie and Louis Armstrong. Also a term used for a musician who had significantly improved their playing. E.g., "I got my chops up" or "Has he got the chops to play with this group?". Chops can also refer to general ability in any skill. E.g., "Yo, I found a lawyer who has the chops to get George Shearing a driver's license!"
Corny
Old-fashioned, stale.
Frail
Abbreviation of "frail sister" (prostitute). Also used for any hepster woman.
G-man
Government man, especially one who arrests or harasses peaceful citizens.
Gage
Marijuana. Particularly associated with Louis Armstrong.
Gate
Any man, usually used as a greeting. "Yo, gate, what's the word from the herd?"
Gatemouth
A horn player who has a large mouth or a mouth that is habitually open. Playing brass instruments often results in larger cheeks and a callus on the player's lip. The larger cheeks is the origin of the word "chops". After 1930, however, "Gatemouth" generally referred only to Louis Armstrong.
Hep
In the know. Later, hip.
Hep cat
Knowledgeable person. Later, hipster.
High
Happy. See "mellow".
Hoochie Coocher
Hot babe who dances lying down. "Minnie the Moocher was a red hot HOOCHIE COOCHER." —Cab Calloway
Hoochie coochie
Erotic dance.
Jeff
Opposite of hep; unhip, uncool or opposed to hipness.
Jelly roll
1) female genitalia, 2) act of coitus. 3) Jelly Roll Morton: a famous stride piano player.
Jitterbug
A swing fan, named after the dance. Same as the Lindy Hop, a dance created in the 1920s and 1930s. Danced to swing and Western swing.
Jive
Cab Calloway defines this in the 1930s as "Harlemese speech", meaning the style of slang. In basic terms jive means talk. It can also mean kidding with someone. It is often confused with jibe which means "be in accordance with".
Jive talk
"Whaddya say, gate? Are you in the know, or are you a solid bringer-downer?" —Cab Calloway. "Are you Hep to the Jive" —Cab Calloway.
Joint is jumping
The place is lively, the club is leaping with fun.
Light up
To light a stick of T or reefer.
Lid
A Prince Albert tobacco can filled to the lid. Roughly one ounce. Used as a measurement of marijuana.
Man!
Commonly used as an interjection or for emphasis. Also an alternative to "boy" which was used by whites as a disparaging term used to hail African-American adult males.
Mellow
"Let's all get mellow." Words in the song "Light Up". The meaning is obscure. Probably means light-hearted, calm and happy. It means feeling the effects of marijuana.
Mighty Mezz
An expertly rolled reefer. Named after Milton Mezz Mezzrow, the saxophonist who played with Louis Armstrong. Mezzrow was a close friend of Louis Armstrong. He was also a user of marijuana and a distributor strictly to other musicians who were his friends.
Mop
A woman. Often a reference to another hepster's girlfriend.
Muggles
1930s and '40s slang for marijuana cigarettes.
Mugglin'
I's a-mugglin', you's a-mugglin', meaning getting high on reefer.
Ofay
A white person, possibly constructed from pig Latin for "foe". Also, policeman or law enforcement, "the Man".
Oreo
A mixed-race person.
Pad
Bed.
Pot
Marijuana.
Puff
To smoke weed.
Reefer
The marijuana plant, aka hemp, pot, ganja, or cannabis. Refers to the leaf of the plant or a cigarette rolled from the plant (JIVE, STICK OF TEA). See also: Reefer Madness, a 1936 anti-cannabis propaganda film.
Reefer man
Someone who uses reefer.
Stick of tea
Joint, reefer, left-handed cigarette.
Stuff
1) Jive, muggles, reefer. 2) Nickname for famous viper, jazz fiddler, "Stuff" Smith, famous composer of viper songs such as "If You're a Viper".
"T" or Tea
Marijuana.
Teapad
in Harlem in the 1930s and 40s, an after-hours club where pot was smoked and jazz music performed.
T-man (Tea-man)
Marijuana provider.
Vipers
Refers to hep cats from the 1930s who inhaled. Examples include Cab Calloway, Fats Waller, Ella Fitzgerald, Nat King Cole, Billie Holiday, Louis Armstrong, Benny Goodman, and Louis Jordan. They frequented tea pads and smoked gage. The term vipers arose from the sssssst sound made by an inhaling pot-smoker or a snake.
Zoot suit
A men's suit with high-waisted, wide-legged, tight-cuffed, pegged trousers, and a long coat with wide lapels and wide padded shoulders. Named in the rhyming way of jive talk: "A Zoot Suit with a reet pleat, with a drape shape with a generous cut but tight cuffs." This was popular with dancers of the swing era.
