= Pinckney (surname) =

Pinckney is an English surname. Notable people with the surname include:

== Pinckney political family of South Carolina ==
- Charles Pinckney (South Carolina chief justice) (1699–1758), South Carolina politician, father of Charles Cotesworth Pinckney and Thomas Pinckney, and uncle of Colonel Charles Pinckney
- Colonel Charles Pinckney (1731–1782), South Carolina politician, British Loyalist during Revolutionary War, father of the Governor Charles Pinckney
- Charles Cotesworth Pinckney (1746–1825), Revolutionary War general and Federalist Party presidential candidate
- Charles Pinckney (governor) (1757–1824), drafter of the United States Constitution, father of Henry Laurens Pinckney, and second cousin of Charles Cotesworth Pinckney
- Eliza Lucas Pinckney (1722–1793), South Carolina planter
- Thomas Pinckney (1750–1828), South Carolina governor, ambassador to Britain, diplomat who arranged Pinckney's Treaty, and a brother of Charles Cotesworth Pinckney
- Henry L. Pinckney (1794–1863), U.S. Representative from South Carolina
- John M. Pinckney (1845–1905), U.S. Representative from Texas; his parents were from South Carolina

== Others ==
- Andrew Pinckney (born 2000), American baseball player
- Bertine Pinckney (1824–1909), American politician
- Callan Pinckney (1939–2012), American fitness professional
- Clementa C. Pinckney (1973–2015), American politician
- Darryl Pinckney (born 1953), American author and critic
- Ed Pinckney (born 1963), American basketball player
- Frank L. Pinckney (1884–1945), American college basketball coach
- John A. Pinckney (1905–1972), American prelate of the Episcopal Church
- Josephine Pinckney (1895–1957), American novelist and poet
- Michael Pinckney (born 1998), American football player
- Scott Pinckney (born 1989), American professional golfer
- St. Clair Pinckney (1930–1999), American saxophonist
- Violet Pinckney (1871–1955), English tennis player
- William Pinckney (1915-1976), United States Navy sailor who was the second African-American to be awarded the Navy Cross
  - USS Pinckney, USN destroyer named in honor of William Pinckney

== See also ==
- Charles Pinckney (disambiguation)
- Governor Pinckney (disambiguation)
- Senator Pinckney (disambiguation)
- Pinckney (disambiguation)
