= Pinkney =

Pinkney is a surname and masculine given name borne by the following people:

== Surname ==
- Alan Pinkney (born 1947), English footballer
- Andrea Davis Pinkney (born 1963), American children's book author, wife of Brian Pinkney
- Bill Pinkney (1925–2007), American performer and singer, member of The Drifters
- Bill Pinkney (sailor) (1935–2023), first African American to sail around the world solo
- Bob Pinkney (c. 1934–2017), Canadian football player
- Brian Pinkney (born 1961), American illustrator, son of illustrator Jerry Pinkney, husband of Andrea Davis Pinkney
- Charles Cotesworth Pinckney (1746–1825), a Founding Father of the United States, Revolutionary War officer, United States Minister to France, attorney, planter and slave owner
- Cleveland Pinkney (born 1977), American football player
- Colleen Pinkney (born 1957), Canadian curler
- David Pinkney (born 1952), English racing driver
- David H. Pinkney (1914–1993), American historian
- Dwight Pinkney (born 1945), Jamaican guitarist
- Edward Coote Pinkney (1802–1828), American poet
- Edward Pinkney, American founder of the Black Autonomy Network Community Organization
- Ernie Pinkney (1887–1975), English footballer
- Fayette Pinkney (1948–2009), American singer, member of the Three Degrees
- George Pinkney (1859–1926), American baseball player
- Isiah Pinkney (born 1968), American rapper 12 Gauge
- Jared Pinkney (born 1997), American football player
- Jerry Pinkney (1939–2021), American book illustrator
- Kevinn Pinkney (born 1983), American basketball player
- Larry Pinkney (fl. 1970s–present, African-American activist
- Lovell Pinkney (born 1972), American football player
- Marie Pinkney, American openly queer social worker and politician elected to the Delaware Senate in 2020
- Miles Pinkney (1599–1674), English Catholic priest
- Nick Pinkney (born 1970), English rugby league footballer
- Ninian Pinkney (1811–1877), US Navy surgeon and medical director, active during the American Civil War
- Peter Pinkney (born 1956), British trade unionist
- Reggie Pinkney (born 1955), American football player
- Ron Pinkney (born 1935), American broadcaster, first African American play-by-play announcer on a major television network
- Rose Catherine Pinkney (born 1964), American television executive
- Thomas Pinckney (1750–1828), American statesman, diplomat, and major general
- William Pinkney (1764–1822), American statesman, diplomat and 7th United States Attorney General
- William Pinkney (bishop) (1810–1883), Bishop of the Episcopal Diocese of Maryland

== Given name ==
- Pink Anderson (1900–1974), American blues singer and guitarist
- Pinkney Lugenbeel (1819–1886), United States Army colonel
- Pinkney L. Near (1927–1990), American museum curator
- Pinkney H. Walker (1815–1885), American jurist

== See also ==
- Pinckney (surname)
- Pinckney (given name)
