= Pinckney =

Pinckney may refer to:

== People ==
- Pinckney (surname)
- Pinckney (given name)

== Places in the United States ==
- Pinckney, Michigan, a village
- Pinckney, Missouri, an unincorporated community
- Pinckney, New York, a town
- Pinckney State Recreation Area, a protected area in Michigan

== Ships ==
- USS Pinckney, a US Navy destroyer

== See also ==
- Castle Pinckney, a US fortification in South Carolina
- The Community Learning Center at Pinckney, an alternative middle and high school in Carthage, North Carolina
- Pinckney's Treaty (1795–1796), between Spain and the US
- Pinkney (disambiguation)
