= Senator Horry =

Senator Horry may refer to:

- Daniel Horry (1747–1785), South Carolina State Senate
- Peter Horry (1743–1815), South Carolina State Senate
