= Litwack =

Litwack is a surname. Notable people with the surname include:

- Georgia Litwack (1922–2020), American photographer and photojournalist
- Harry Litwack (1907–1999), American basketball coach
- Leon Litwack (1929–2021), American historian
- Katherine Litwack (born 1986), birth name of Kat Dennings, American actress
