= Ravenal =

Ravenal is a surname. Notable people with the surname include:

- Earl Ravenal (1931–2019), American foreign policy analyst, academic, and writer
- John Ravenal (born 1959), American art historian, writer, and museum curator
