= National Black Network =

American radio network (1973–1995)

- Country: United States
- Headquarters: New York City

Programming
- Language(s): English

Ownership
- Key people: Eugene D. Jackson; Sydney L. Small; Del Raycee; Roy N. Wood Sr. Vince Sanders

History
- Founded: Atlanta, Georgia U.S.
- Launch date: July 2, 1973
- Closed: 1995
- Replaced by: American Urban Radio Networks

Coverage
- Availability: National, through regional affiliates

The National Black Network (NBN) was an American radio network that began operation on July 2, 1973, as the first coast-to-coast radio network wholly owned by African Americans.

== Early years ==
The idea for a National Black Network was conceived by former ABC Radio and Mutual Broadcasting System President Robert Pauley in 1969 as a way to utilize Mutual's contracted but unused network lines for the benefit of African Americans. The goal was to tie together the 117 radio stations in the country to serve the African-American audience.

The National Black Network became the first coast-to-coast radio network fully owned by African Americans on July 2, 1973, in New York City. The NBN was the brainchild of white media executive Robert Pauley, who eventually handed over the idea to African-American executives Eugene D. Jackson and Sydney L. Small and African-American journalists Vince Sanders and Roy Wood Sr.

Pauley, a white American, a president of both ABC Radio and Mutual Broadcasting System, looked for a way to utilize Mutual's unused network lines to create 117 stations to serve a Black audience. Pauley was unable to raise the $1 million in capital he needed, and therefore turned to Eugene D. Jackson, an African-American electrical engineer and Black business consultant. Sydney L. Small, a former employee of ABC Radio Network, and Del Raycee of Mutual Broadcasting, joined Jackson and Pauley. Mr. Pauley finally became frustrated with the difficult task of raising the $1,000,000 in capital needed to start the operation and abandoned the effort. Jackson and Small along with Del Raycee of Mutual Broadcasting System persevered and finally launch the National Black Network on July 2, 1973, in New York City with 25 affiliates.

NBN aired 5-minute newscasts at the hour and sportscasts several times a day at the half-hour. NBN also aired a wide variety of public affairs programs and a live overnight talk show hosted by Bob Law. In 1972, there were only 17 African-American-owned radio stations even though there were over 125 African-American-oriented stations in the country, and by 1976 Eugene D. Jackson became the only African American on the 125 member board of directors of the National Association of Broadcasters (NAB).

With over 80 affiliates associated with NBN, Jackson wanted to see more radio stations owned by African Americans and therefore, conceived and started the National Association of Black Owned Broadcasters (NABOB) in Atlanta as a complement to his position on the NAB Board. Within 15 years, the number of African-American-owned radio station moved to almost 50 through the creation of Broadcap, a capital raising institution formed by the NAB and the captains of the television and radio industry. In the early 1980s NBN offered a second news service, American Urban Information Radio, which broadcast an hourly newscast at 50 minutes past the hour, but concentrated on in-depth reporting. By 1995, NBN merged with its main competitor, the Sheridan Broadcasting Network (formerly the Mutual Black Network), to form the American Urban Radio Networks.

The first news director was Roy N. Wood Sr., from the famed Chicago radio station WVON, "The voice of the Negro". In 1975 Roy Wood was replaced by Vince Sanders, another Chicago area talent and veteran of local radio for the African-American audiences. Sanders, served as Vice President of Broadcast Operations at NBN until ended operations in 1995. Sanders joined NBN following 3 years with NBC news and its Chicago owned-and-operated station: WMAQ-AM. Before NBC, Sanders was a talk show host for 8 years at WBEE-AM in the Chicago market. His final assignment with NBN Broadcasting included Vice President and General Manager of its New York City station, WWRL-AM.

Small and Jackson hired WABC's Mal Goode to be a Senior Consultant and the network's United Nations correspondent. Working for ABC, Mr. Goode gained notoriety while being stationed at the UN, reporting the responses of President John F. Kennedy to the Bay of Pigs Invasion initiative of Fidel Castro. Mr. Goode continued working as a Senior UN Correspondent for National Black Network until 1991 when the two largest African-American radio networks in American merged to form the American Urban Radio Networks, the Nation's only African-American-owned-and-controlled radio network and the #1 Neilsen rated national audio network company reaching African Americans. With over 40 million weekly listeners on 6,000 affiliates. Eugene Jackson and Sidney Small dissolved their partnership shortly before this merger, leaving Small to form the alliance with Ronald R. Davenport of the Sheridan Broadcasting Network.

== Notable personalities ==
Long before Bob Law gained fame with "Night Talk", there were a number of Black radio stars on the airwaves at NBN, such as Frank Bannister Jr., who also wrote the "Black College Polls" for Jet Magazine each week. The heavyweight boxing champion Muhammad Ali made his presence known visiting Frank Bannister after a defeat to Leon Spinks. After his death from a heart attack, Bannister was replaced by Ron Pinkney, a former colleague of Gerald Bentley and Ed Castleberry, who were already on the airwaves of NBN.

Roy Wood's "One Black Man's Opinion" was a major showcase of the former-WVON anchor, allowing him a no-holds-barred avenue to the listeners each week. Joseph "Joe" Brown hosted "Black Issues In The Black Press", another weekly news program that focused on the issues of the day. The guest and talented performers ranged from Judge Bruce Wright to Evelyn "Champagne" King.

Eddie Kendricks and David Ruffin of The Temptations were seen joking and laughing it up with Ed Castleberry before airtime. Castleberry made his mark working with Larry Dean at Cincinnati's famed WCIN. Many in the business knew that Castleberry and "Gentleman" Dean were the real models for Venus Flytrap and Dr. Johnny Fever of television's WKRP in Cincinnati.

== Locations ==
NBN moved from 1350 Avenue of the Americas, New York City, to 10 Columbus Circle, and ended its reign at 4130 58th Street, Woodside, Queens. This was the same location that housed WWRL, a 1960s Black radio powerhouse that helped launch the career of black radio personality Francis "Frankie" Edward Crocker.
