= Vince Sanders =

American broadcaster

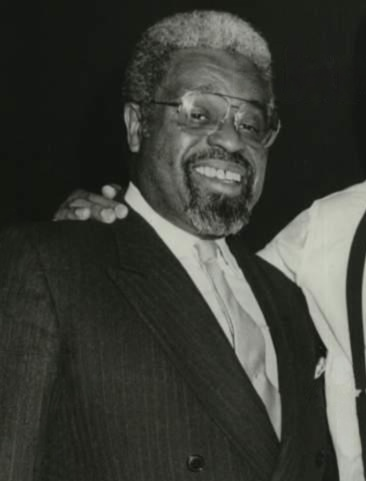
Sanders c. 1988

Vince Sanders is a veteran of the broadcast industry having spent nearly 40 years on the job. He has written two books, both titles dedicated to his years behind the microphone or on the stage as an actor: Can't Get HERE from THERE and That's Not Funny! Sanders began his broadcast career as an on-air talent at WBEE-AM in Chicago in 1958. He retired in 1995 as vice president and general manager of station WWRL-AM in New York City. Simultaneously, he was Vice President of Broadcast Operations at the National Black Network (NBN). WWRL and NBN were owned by the same company. Sanders won the Gabriel Award in 1972 while an anchor/reporter for NBC (WMAQ) news, a position he held from 1971 until 1973. This followed his achievement of the same award in 1963 while working with the Chicago Centennial Authority.

== Early life ==
Vince Sanders (aka Vinson J. Sanders) was born in 1935 on a small farm in Waldo, Florida, a sprawling railroad community about 50 miles south of Jacksonville. His mother and his father divorced when Vince was six months old, thereby relegating much of his formative years to the tutelage of his grandparents.

After being forced to adjust to several schools, Vince wound up at the historic Jones High School in Orlando in 1948. In his junior year of high school, he suffered a dislocated hip, causing him to sit out a full school term. Following his mother's second marriage, he became a permanent resident of Orlando, with a new stepfather. His mother provided as much wisdom for him as she could, for which Vince often credits her as his eventual sculptor in life. After pursuing a military career and further education, Sanders moved to Chicago, where he studied speech and drama under Ethel Minns Lucas of the Chicago Conservatory and the EML School of Speech and Drama.

== Career ==
Sanders began his radio career at WBEE-AM in Chicago as an on-air actor in 1958. In addition, he was active as a theatrical performer, while simultaneously performing weekends at the (Joe) Louis Theater under the tutelage of playwright Theodore Ward, who sought Sanders to play the lead role of Joshua Tain in his three-act drama with music, Our Lan’. Most of his performances back then, including his radio theatre appearances, were unpaid under the auspices of Community Theatre.

Sanders appeared in productions of wide-ranging genre for several main-line companies including Hull House Theatre, the American Negro Opera Guild, the Richard B. Harrison Players, and the Southside Center for Performing Arts.

In 1963, Sanders served as Theatre Consultant for the American Negro Emancipation Centennial Exposition in Chicago in 1963 and narrated NBC's documentary One More River.

It was also in the early 1960s that he began his call-in radio talk show, Opinion. His guests over more than eight years included some with the highest profiles among African-American newsmakers as well as other celebrities. During this period, Sanders also hosted a call-in talk show and a quiz contest over WCIU-TV, Chicago's Channel 26. At WCIU, he was often called to work with Don Cornelius—before his Soul Train fame—and Roy Wood as anchor on A Black’s View of the News.

Sanders was a special correspondent for KPOI radio in Honolulu, Hawaii, in 1968.

In 1969 he introduced the nation's first black and white stand-up comedy team, Tim and Tom, and managed them for four years before their break-up.

In 1970, Sanders moved to Chicago's NBC station WMAQ. As an anchor-reporter for the parent company, he worked for both the radio and TV operations. In 1972, he narrated a second award-winning documentary for NBC, The House That Jack Built.

A move from Chicago to New York City in 1973 provided a ground-floor role in the development of the National Black Network, which was the nation's first Black-owned and operated radio news network. In the second year, Sanders was promoted from News Anchor to News Director, and shortly thereafter to Vice President of Broadcast Operations. With this addition he became Executive Producer of The Ossie Davis/Ruby Dee Story Hour for three years.

In 1974, Sanders and NBN's sports director, Frank Bannister, covered the return to the ring of Muhammad Ali when Ali knocked out George Foreman in the 8th round in “the fight of the century”, held in Kinshasa, Zaire. In 1976, Sanders was part a US delegation of journalists in South Africa for the Transkei transfer from Apartheid rule. Transkei was the first homeland to achieve internal self-government in 1963, followed by full "independence" on October 26, 1976. In that same year, Sanders was part of US delegations to Nairobi, Kenya, Israel and Jordan.

In 1983, as NBN continued growing under Sanders' management, he became vice president and general manager of its New York City radio station, WWRL-AM. He held both positions until his retirement from the company in 1995, both companies enjoying noteworthy achievement under his control.

Sanders is a founding member of the National Association of Black Journalists and was inducted into its Hall of Fame in 2005. He was an original board member of the Central Florida Theatre Alliance and the People's Theatre in Orlando.

== Life after retirement ==
Since returning to live in Orlando in 1997, Vince Sanders has published two books: Can't Get HERE from THERE, based on his role in the development of NBN, the world's first Black-owned and operated radio news network that was designed to cover news from an African-American perspective; and That's Not Funny!, from the vantage point of Sanders' management of the nation's first Black and White stand-up comedy team, Tim and Tom, formed by actor/producer Tim Reid and stand-up comic Tom Dreesen, who endured the disdain of hostile audiences while trying to induce Americans to laugh at the unfortunate aspects of America's racial practices.

== Awards ==
- 1963 One More River (NBC) Gabriel Award
- 1967 A Pictorial History of Radio by Irving Settel
- 1972 The House That Jack Built (NBC) Gabriel Award
- 1975 Southern Regional Press Institute Meritorious Service Award
- 1975 (Founding Member) National Association Of Black Journalist (NABJ)
- 2005 National Association of Black Journalists Hall of Fame (Region 5)
