= Pinkney (disambiguation) =

Pinkney is a surname and given name.

Pinkney may also refer to:

== Places ==
- Pinkney, Wiltshire, a hamlet in England
- Pinkney City, Washington, a community in Stevens County, Washington, USA

== Other uses ==
- Dave Pinkney Trophy, an award in the Ontario Hockey League
- USS Pinkney, a World War II evacuation transport

== See also ==
- Pinkney and Gerrick Woods, a biological site in Cleveland, England
- Pinkneys Green, a village in Berkshire, England
- Pinkney's Point, Nova Scotia, Canada, a community in Nova Scotia
- Pinkneyville, New Jersey, an unincorporated community
- Pinckney (disambiguation)
