= Pinckneyville, Mississippi =

Unincorporated community in Mississippi, United States

Pinckneyville
- Unincorporated community
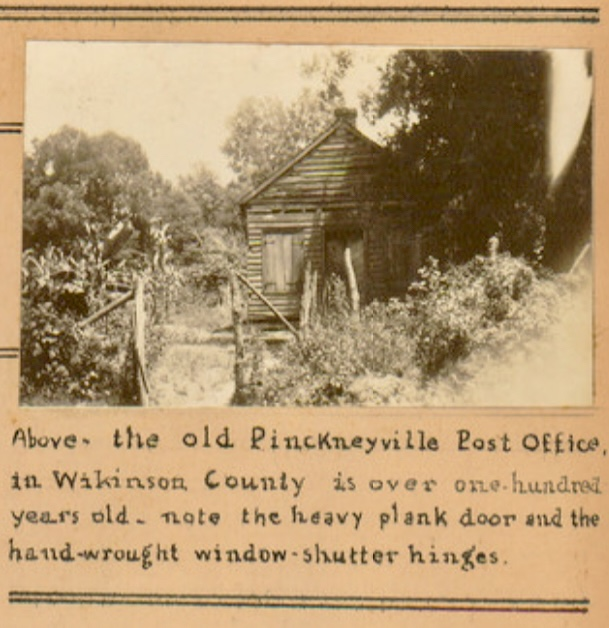
- "The old Pinckneyville Post Office, in Wikinson County is over one-hundred years old - note the heavy plank door and the hand-wrought window-shutter hinges," as documented by the WPA c. 1936 (MDAH Series 443, file 73473-sb3-08)

- Location within the state of Mississippi
- Coordinates: 31°00′58″N 91°28′51″W
- Country: United States
- State: Mississippi
- County: Wilkinson
- Elevation: 239 ft (73 m)
- Time zone: UTC-6 (Central (CST))
  - Summer (DST): UTC-5 (CDT)
- GNIS feature ID: 675789

Pinckneyville is an unincorporated community in Wilkinson County, Mississippi. Its elevation is 239 feet (73 m). The town was named for the prominent Pinckney family of South Carolina, from which many of its settlers came. Charles Pinckney helped draft the US Constitution and served as governor of the state of South Carolina; other members of his family were also political leaders. In 1815, the Pinckneyville Academy was established.

The settlement of Pinckneyville was mapped by James Wilkinson on his survey of what became the Natchez Trace following the 1801 Treaty of Fort Adams. The Kempers of the so-called Kemper Rebellion (actually a series of minor border skirmishes and shootings) had an inn at Pinckneyville.

== Education ==
Wilkinson County School District serves the entire county.

Wilkinson County is in the district of Southwest Mississippi Community College.
