= Roy Wood Sr. =

African-American radio pioneer

- Born: Roy Norris Wood; September 15, 1915; Atlanta, Georgia, U.S.
- Died: October 15, 1995 (aged 80); Birmingham, Alabama, U.S.
- Occupation: Journalist
- Years active: 1932–1995
- Known for: Co-founder, National Black Network
- Notable work: One Black Man's Opinion
- Children: Roy Wood Jr.

Roy Norris Wood Sr. (September 15, 1915 – October 15, 1995) was an African-American radio pioneer, civil rights journalist, commentator, college professor, and entrepreneur. Wood was the host of the nationally syndicated TV show Black's View on the News. He was a co-founder of the National Black Network, one of the first broadcast networks to produce programming specifically for African Americans.

== Early life and education ==
Wood was born in Atlanta, Georgia, the son of Rosalie N. (Latimer) and Roy Wood Sr. Wood's father, a physician, died when he was three years old. His mother, who attended Morris Brown College, was one of the first female black CPAs in the state of Georgia. His great-great-grandfather, Sam Wood, was born c. 1790 in Africa. Wood grew up in Chicago.

Wood was a graduate of Wendell Phillips Academy High School in Chicago.

In 1937, Wood received a B.A. from Morehouse College in Atlanta, Georgia. In 1946, Wood received an M.A. in Communications from Columbia University Graduate School of Journalism. He later studied at Columbia College Chicago's College of Fine Arts in Radio Announcing and Newscasting.

== Career ==
In 1932, at the age of 17 years old, Wood began his career in journalism working for Jack L. Cooper in Chicago.

From April 1949 to July 1950, in his first full-time job in radio, Wood was staff announcer at WJVA in Mishawaka, Indiana on the morning sign on show, Sunrise Serenade.

From July 1950 to October 1953, Wood was staff announcer at WIBC radio in Indianapolis, Indiana, where he was the first African American to hold an announcer position on a major network affiliate of Mutual Broadcasting System (MBS). In addition to weekend evening newscasts, he hosted record shows and was part of the radio serial, The Oldtimer.

From November 1953 to December 1954, Wood was a disc jockey at WJLD-AM/WJLD-FM in Birmingham, Alabama. He was the first Black radio deejay at the station.

From December 1954 to June 1957, Wood was program director and DJ at KATZ (AM) in St. Louis, Missouri.

From July 1957 to June 1959, Wood worked as a staff announcer at WHFC radio in Chicago, a foreign language station.

From July 1959 to October 1961, Wood was a staff announcer and personality on WGES Radio in Chicago.

From October 1961 to April 1963, Wood was a news reporter at Chicago's WYNR radio.

From July 1968 to June 1970, Wood was at Channel 26 TV in Chicago, where he produced and was the anchor on the Western Electric-sponsored Black's View on the News. During this time, from 1968 to 1971, he also wrote and produced the radio documentary series Footsteps to Democracy.

From April 1963 to May 1972, Wood was news director and editorialist at WVON Radio in Chicago. Wood was a notable newsman at the radio station. During this time, Wood reported on the experiences of Black platoons in the Vietnam War, and the racism they encountered, and often brought news back to loved ones in the Chicago area trying to reach their deployed soldiers.

In 1972, Wood co-founded the National Black Network (NBN), the first Black-owned radio network. As National News Director and Vice President, he was responsible for recruiting newsroom talent

Wood was the host and anchor of One Black Man's Opinion, a syndicated series on the National Black Network that aired on over 90 stations across the United States. The series focused on the Black experience in the U.S.

Cold Hard Facts was a daily talk show Wood hosted on WVAS at Alabama State University.

In 1971 and 1972, Wood was a professor at Malcolm X College in Chicago, where he taught journalism and broadcast speech. Wood was an associate professor in the School of Communications at Howard University in Washington, D.C. He also lectured at Northwestern University's Medill School of Journalism and at his alma mater, Columbia University Graduate School of Journalism.

Wood was the news director at WENN-WAGT radio in Birmingham, Alabama.

Wood also worked as an insurance agent and broker.

Wood notably helped Don Cornelius get his start in the entertainment industry. Cornelius was a policeman at the Chicago Police Department who stopped Wood for speeding. Wood remarked on how pleasant his voice was, saying that he should work in radio, giving him his card. Wood was a mentor, and ended up hiring him to be an announcer, news reporter and disc jockey on WVON. Wood lent Cornelius money for what would become Soul Train, first at WCIU TV and then as a popular nationally syndicated TV show.

== Personal life ==
Wood was seriously injured in an automobile accident. Wood said that the injury led to his mother taking him to talk to a psychiatrist to address depression that was manifested by withdrawal and low self-esteem. At the time Wood already had an undergraduate degree, so the psychiatrist noted his voice was pleasant and suggested going back to school to become a radio announcer.

Wood was married to Louise Hurt Wood, with whom he had two sons, one of whom is Roy L. Wood, an anchorman. He later married Joyce Dugan Wood, with whom he had a son, the comedian and The Daily Show correspondent, Roy Wood Jr.

Wood died of prostate cancer in Birmingham, Alabama, at the age of 80.

== Membership ==
- Alpha Phi Alpha, Member
- Chicago Urban League, Member
- Concerned Parents of South Shore, Member
- NAACP, Member
- National Association of TV and Radio Announcers, Member
- Southern Christian Leadership Conference, Member
- The Black Media Reps (Black journalists organization), Member
- YMCA, Member

== Leadership ==
- *American Federation of TV and Radio Artists (AFTRA), board member
- Alpha Phi Alpha, board member
- B.A.M.A. (Southern Black broadcasters organization), board member
- Boy Scouts of America, Ft. Dearborn Division, board member
- Chicago Mental Health Commission, board member
- Chicago Press Club, board member
- Coalition of Westside Community Organizations, board member
- Illinois News Broadcasters Association (INBA), board member
- Operation P.U.S.H. (People United to Save, etc.), board member
- Radio Television News Directors Association (RTNDA), board member
- Sears YMCA, board member
- Sigma Delta Chi, board member
- South Shore Property Owners Association, board member
- The Headline Club, board member

== Honors ==
- 1967: Humanitarian AwardListed in multiple biographical sources; however, the specific awarding organization, context, and citation have not been verified
- 1968: ACOR, Gold Mike Award, Best Editorial
- 1968: Best new TV show for Black's View on the News
- 1969: American Friendship Award
- 1969: Emmy Award, nominee for local TV
- 1970: KOCO, Concerned Citizens Award
- 1970: YMCA, Good Citizenship Award
- 1971: ACOR, Gold Mike Award for Crime Stop
- 1972: Malcolm X College, Certificate of Merit
- 1979: Wendell Phillips Academy High School, Hall of Fame.
- 1993: National Association of Black Journalists, Lifetime Achievement Award

== Selected filmography ==
- 1949-1950: Sunrise Serenade morning show
- 1950-1953: The Oldtimer radio serial
- 1968-1970: Black's View on the News news program
- 1968-1971: Footsteps to Democracy radio documentary series
- 19XX-19XX: One Black Man's Opinion syndicated news program
- 19XX-19XX: Cold Hard Facts daily talk show
