= American Urban Radio Networks =

Radio network in the US

American Urban Radio Networks, LLC
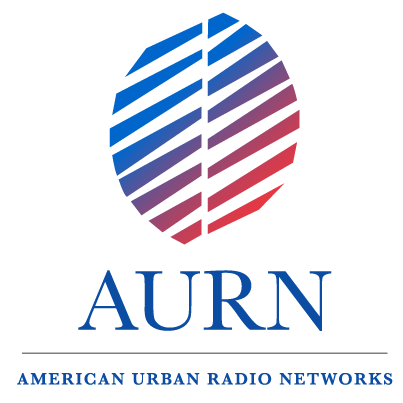
- Type: Radio
- Branding: AURN
- Country: United States
- Availability: National, through regional affiliates
- Founded: 1991; 35 years ago
- Headquarters: 1 Penn Plaza, Suite 2100, New York City, United States
- Launch date: 1991
- Official website: aurn.com
- Language: English
- Replaced: Mutual Black Network; National Black Network

American Urban Radio Networks, LLC (AURN) is the only African-American-owned-and-operated Nielsen RADAR-rated radio network in the United States.

American Urban Radio Networks has been privately held since its founding, and it has not changed ownership since it was formed in 1991 through a merger of the Sheridan Broadcasting Network (SBN), previously known as the Mutual Black Network, and the National Black Network (NBN). AURN reaches an estimated 40 million listeners weekly on over 6,000 affiliates and provides the advertising community with multiple networks and marketing, gaming, and digital capabilities.

AURN is the only African-American broadcasting company with a desk in the White House and has offices in New York City, Pittsburgh, Boston, Chicago, and Los Angeles.

== History ==
American Urban Radio Networks, LLC was formed in 1991 from a merger of the Sheridan Broadcasting Network (SBN) and National Black Network (NBN). SBN was previously known as the Mutual Black Network (MBN) when it was founded by the Mutual Broadcasting System in 1972 as the first national full-service radio network aimed at African Americans. African-American media company Sheridan Broadcasting Corporation purchased 49% of MBN in 1976, followed by the remaining 51% in 1979, renaming it SBN.

Sheridan Broadcasting Corporation owned 51% of AURN, until it was forced to give up its share in 2016, following a lawsuit launched by junior partner NBN. Sheridan Broadcasting later went out of business.

== Programming ==
AURN handles affiliations, sales, and marketing for nationally syndicated programs including Alice's Attic with Alice Cooper, Yung Joc & The Streetz Morning Takeover, Ebro in The Morning with Laura Stylez and Peter Rosenberg, Nessa on Air, Quiet Storm with Lenny Green, The Marvin Sapp Radio Show, The Bassment with E-Rock, Most Requested Live with Romeo, The Hezekiah Walker Gospel Countdown, Invisible Eagles Podcast, Radio Health Journal, Viewpoints Radio, The Sic 60 with HipHopGamer, Cafe Mocha Radio, Live in Concert, RapFabulous, AfroZons, Southern Soul Mix with Jammin' Jay, and AURN News, featuring White House, Capitol Hill, and culture updates. AURN also produces digital programs including Couch Party with Yonathan Elias and On the Record with Ebony McMorris.
