= Roy Wood Jr. =

American comedian, and actor (born 1978)

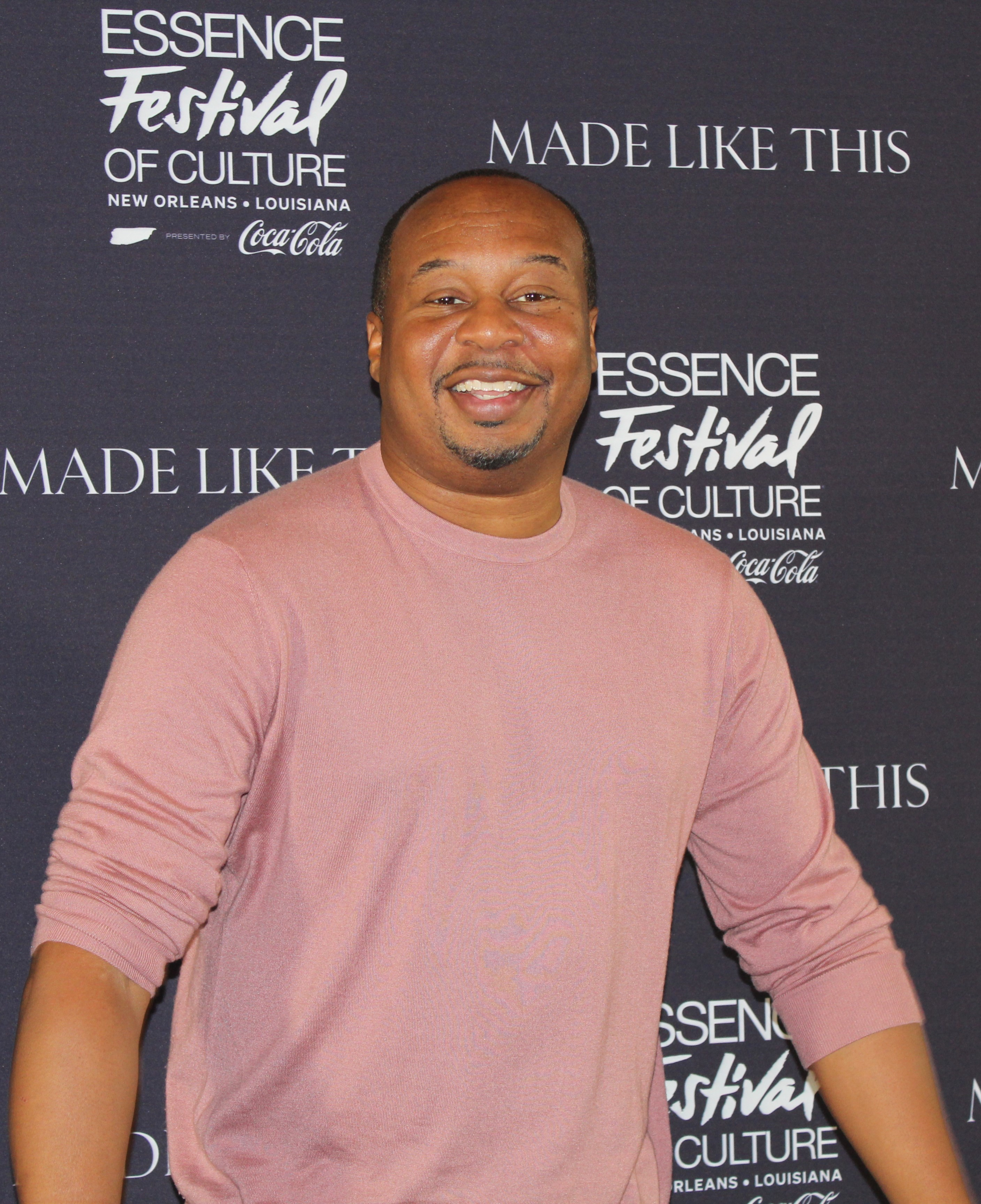
- Wood at Essence Festival of Culture July 2025.
- Born: Roy Norris Wood Jr. December 11, 1978 (age 47); New York City, U.S.
- Education: Florida A&M University (BS)
- Occupations: Comedian; actor; writer
- Years active: 1998–present
- Children: 1
- Father: Roy Wood Sr.
- Website: roywoodjr.com

Roy Norris Wood Jr. (born December 11, 1978) is an American stand-up comedian, actor, and writer who first became well known for his correspondent appearances on The Daily Show. Wood has been hosting the American adaptation of the news and entertainment panel show Have I Got News for You on CNN since September 2024.

A resident of Manhattan, Wood was raised in Birmingham, Alabama, and Memphis, Tennessee. After graduating from Ramsay High School in 1996, Wood began his career in stand-up comedy as the opening act for Tommy Davidson. He had a position as head writer on the WBHJ radio series Buckwilde Morning Show from 2001 to 2006. Wood has been featured on NBC's reality television series Last Comic Standing in 2010 and the TBS sitcom Sullivan & Son from 2011 to 2014. He formerly hosted two podcasts for Comedy Central: Roy's Job Fair and Beyond the Scenes.

Wood was honored at Entertainment Weekly's "12 Rising Stars of Comedy" in 2008 and the 2010 Florida A&M University Young Alumni Awards. From 2015 to 2023, Wood served as a correspondent for The Daily Show on Comedy Central. He hosted the fourth season of Comedy Central's This Is Not Happening from 2018 to 2019. In addition to his Daily Show appearances, Wood has starred in the stand-up comedy specials Father Figure (2017), No One Loves You (2019), Imperfect Messenger (2021) and Lonely Flowers (2025). He has also been featured in television series and movies.

== Early life and education ==
Wood was born in Manhattan, New York City, New York. His father, Roy Wood Sr., was a Birmingham, Alabama, radio broadcasting and journalism pioneer who covered the civil rights movement: the racism encountered by African-American soldiers in the Vietnam War, the Soweto uprising, and the Rhodesian Bush War, among other topics. His mother is Joyce Dugan Wood, a college administrator. His paternal three times great-grandfather, Sam Wood, was born c. 1790 in Africa. His parents separated for a time, and Wood lived with his mother in Memphis, Tennessee. When Wood was in the second grade, his parents reconciled, so the family moved to Birmingham; they lived on South Park Road in Birmingham's West End neighborhood. His half-brother is Roy L. Wood, a news anchor. He is a first cousin of the late jazz drummer Jack DeJohnette.

Wood attended Central Park Elementary and Center Street Middle School. He graduated from Ramsay High School in 1996. In 2001, Wood received a Bachelor of Science in broadcast journalism from Florida A&M University.

== Career ==
=== Before Comedy Central ===
While in college, Wood worked as a morning news reporter for Birmingham, Alabama, radio station WBHJ 95.7 Jamz Hot 105.7. He began focusing on a career in comedy after filling in for the station's in-house comedian, Rickey Smiley.

In 1998, when he was 19, Wood began his career as a standup. Wood recalls that he passed on his midterm tests, essentially failing the semester, in order to open for Tommy Davidson.

In 2001, after graduating from college, Wood returned to Birmingham and became the head writer/producer for the Buckwilde Morning Show (WBHJ 95.7 JAMZ), a position he held until 2006. He continued working in radio, providing prank calls and content to various morning shows nationally and contributing to Jamie Foxx's Foxxhole station on Sirius XM Radio. Wood released three prank call CDs: My Momma Made Me Wear This (2003), Confessions of a Bench Warmer (2005), and I'll Slap You to Sleep (2007). Wood's pranks have been featured on numerous hip-hop mix tapes.

In 2007, Wood moved to Los Angeles.

In 2010, Wood finished third in the seventh season of NBC's Last Comic Standing and began hosting his own morning show, The Roy Wood Jr Show. The show garnered top ratings and won 'Large Market Morning Show of the Year' from the Alabama Broadcasters Association for several years.

From 2011 to 2014, Wood appeared on the TBS sitcom Sullivan & Son. He had a guest starring role in the first season, but was then promoted to series regular for the second and third seasons. Sullivan & Son was canceled in 2014.

In 2013, Wood's first stand-up comedy CD, Things I Think, I Think, was released.

In 2015, he was cast by ABC to play alongside Whoopi Goldberg in the comedy pilot Delores and Jermaine; the show did not make it beyond the pilot stage.

=== At Comedy Central ===
In 2015, Wood joined The Daily Show as a correspondent. Wood moved to New York City to take the job. Wood has said that his background in standup coupled with his degree in journalism prepared him for the job. Wood said that his work doing guest roles in sports on ESPN and related companies prepared him for The Daily Show, giving him experience with acting, timing, and building characters.

His first Comedy Central stand-up special, Father Figure, premiered in 2017, with an extended uncensored album of the same name released by Comedy Central Records. In 2017, he was named the new host of Comedy Central's storytelling series This Is Not Happening. Wood's second Comedy Central special, Roy Wood Jr.: No One Loves You, premiered in 2019.

Wood has appeared as a comic on many late night talk shows, including the Late Show with David Letterman, The Late Late Show with Craig Ferguson, Chelsea Lately, The Tonight Show Starring Jimmy Fallon, The Late Show with Stephen Colbert, Late Night with Seth Meyers, and Conan. Wood has performed for the troops on numerous USO tours in the Middle East and the Pacific Islands.

In 2018, it was announced that Wood planned on shooting a TV show in Jefferson County, Alabama. The pilot, called Jefferson County Probation, started shooting in May 2019. As of March 2020, a completed pilot for the show, now called Jefferson County: Probation, was shot for Comedy Central, with the show in development. The show, created in collaboration with Aaron McGruder (The Boondocks), is about two probation officers in Jefferson County, Alabama.

In 2019, Wood did a series of YouTube videos centered on the Popeyes chicken sandwich craze called The Coalition (Chicken Sandwich Coalition).

In 2021, he was a guest on the PBS series Finding Your Roots, where he described how he unexpectedly got probation at 19 for using credit cards he stole while a mail sorter for the US Postal Service to buy fashion jeans, and where it was revealed that he was a distant cousin of Congressman and civil rights activist John Lewis.

In 2023, Wood hosted the White House Correspondents’ Dinner.

=== After Comedy Central ===
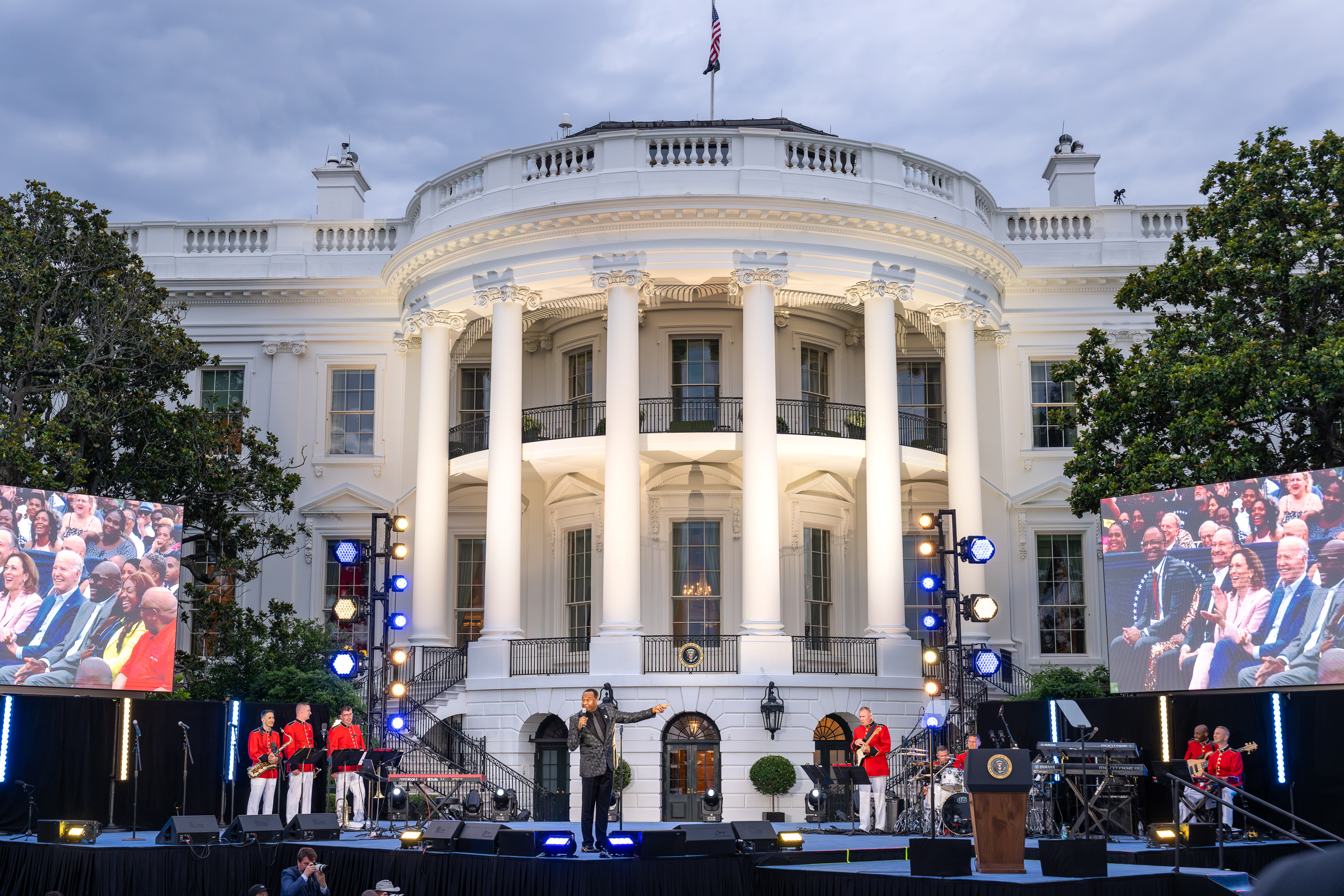
Wood emceeing a concert for Juneteenth at the White House, 2024

On October 5, 2023, it was announced that Wood had quit The Daily Show and would not be returning as a correspondent.

Wood has been hosting the American adaptation of the news and entertainment panel show Have I Got News for You on CNN since September 14, 2024. He has hosted the British version once a year since 2024.

Wood's memoir, The Man of Many Fathers, was released in October 2025.

== Honors ==
- 2008: Entertainment Weekly, 12 Rising Stars of Comedy
- 2010: Florida A&M University, Young Alumni Awards: A 40/40 Celebration

== Selected publications ==
- Wood Jr., Roy (September 19, 2018). "For Roy Wood Jr., Alabama Is Painful History, New Hope and Home". The New York Times.
- Wood Jr, Roy (February 9, 2020). "Opinion: I was furious when we moved to Birmingham". Comeback Town, AL.com.
- Wood Jr, Roy (March 16, 2020). "It's Time for Stand-ups to Prepare for the Worst". Vulture. New York Magazine.

== Filmography ==
=== Film ===
Year	Title	Role	Notes	Ref.
2019	The Death of Dick Long	Dr. Richter		
2020	The Opening Act	Gary		
2022	Confess, Fletch	Sergeant Inspector Monroe		
2023	Urkel Saves Santa: the Movie	Department Store Santa, Old Man Buechler (voice)	Direct-to-video	
2025	Love, Brooklyn	Alan		
2026	Outcome		Post-production	

=== Television ===
Year	Title	Role	Notes	Ref.
2001	Showtime at the Apollo	Himself		
2003	Star Search	—	Comedian Semi Finalist	
2005	Premium Blend	Himself		
2005	ComicView	Himself		
2008	Def Comedy Jam	Himself	1 episode; also writer	
2010	Last Comic Standing	Himself	5 episodes; also writer (4 episodes)	
2012–2014	Sullivan & Son	Roy	33 episodes	
2015	Delores & Jermaine	Jerome Sr.	Comedy pilot	
2015–2023	The Daily Show	Himself (correspondent), various characters		
2017	Impractical Jokers: After Party	Himself	1 episode	
2017	Let's Fix Sports	Himself	1 episode ("Roy Wood Jr: Kill The Kiss Cam"); also writer	
2018–2019	This is Not Happening	Himself (host)	20 episodes; also writer (2 episodes)	
2018	The Detour	Kevin	1 episode	
2019	Crank Yankers	Himself		
2019	Roy Wood Jr.: Snitch Cop	Snitch Cop	TV movie	
2019	Roy Wood Jr.: The Avenging Ones	Luke Rage	TV movie; also writer	
2019	Jefferson County: Probation	—	Pilot; also producer, writer	
2020	Better Call Saul	Grant	1 episode ("Something Unforgivable")	
2020	The Last O.G.	Runson	1 episode	
2020	Space Force	Liaison Bert Mellows	2 episodes	
2020	Impractical Jokers: Dinner Party	Himself	1 episode	
2021	Only Murders in the Building	Vaughn	1 episode	
2021–2022	Flatbush Misdemeanors	Principal Douglas	2 episodes	
2023	The Daily Show	Himself (Guest Host)	4 episodes (Week of Apr. 3)	
2023	White House Correspondents' Dinner	Himself (Host)	April 29	
2024	Last Week Tonight	Boeing Employee	1 episode ("Airplanes")	
2024–2025	Have I Got News for You (US)	Host	ongoing - 20 episodes as of April 2025	
2024–2025	Have I Got News for You (UK)	Host	2 episodes - Shown on 8 November 2024, 30 May 2025, 9 April 2026	

=== Web series ===
Year	Title	Role	Notes	Ref.
2019–2020	The Coalition	—	TV short videos; also writer and creator	

=== Stand-up specials ===
Year	Title	Notes
2017	Father Figure	Comedy Central special also digital download
2019	No One Loves You	Comedy Central special also digital download
2021	Imperfect Messenger	Comedy Central special also digital download
2025	Lonely Flowers	Hulu special

== Writing ==
Year	Title	Role	Notes
2006	Bob & Tom: Standup Sitting Down	Writer	TV Movie
2008	The Funny Spot	Writer	TV Series
2025	The Man of Many Fathers	Writer	Memoir

== Selected discography ==
- 2003: My Momma Made Me Wear This CD
- 2005: Confessions of a Bench Warmer CD
- 2007: I'll Slap You to Sleep CD
- 2013: Things I Think, I Think CD
