= Pinkney L. Near =

American art historian (1927–1990)

- Born: 1927; New York City, U.S.
- Died: August 29, 1990 (aged 62–63); Hartford, Connecticut, U.S.
- Education: Johns Hopkins University; Harvard
- Occupations: Museum curator; art historian; author
- Employer(s): Cincinnati Art Museum; Virginia Museum of Fine Arts
- Spouse: Henrietta Lloyd

Pinkney L. Near (1927 – August 29, 1990) was the curator of the Cincinnati Museum of Art and afterward the curator of the Virginia Museum of Fine Arts for thirty years. He was responsible for the VMFA's acquisition of many treasured works of art, including arranging for the museum to purchase from John Lee Pratt the Francisco Goya portrait of General Nicolas Guye and from the collection of Count Karol Lanckoroński of Vienna, Austria, a rare marble sarcophagus dating to the 2nd century B.C. The Guye portrait was long believed to be the most valuable single work of art in the VMFA's collection. The Goya portrait of General Guye is on view prominently in the posthumously created Pinkney Near Gallery at the VMFA.

== Biography ==
Pinkney Near was born in New York City and was raised in Baltimore, Maryland. In 1944 he graduated from St. Paul's School, and in 1950 he became the first art history graduate of Johns Hopkins University. He earned his master's degree from Harvard in 1951, and he studied French Romanesque sculpture in Paris for three years on a Fulbright scholarship. He remained in Europe an additional year for research on a Sachs fellowship. He married the former Henrietta Lloyd. Every summer Near, a specialist in European art, and his artist wife Henrietta Lloyd Near, a former colleague at the VMFA, traveled to Europe to acquire art for the Virginia Museum of Fine Arts. Among the cities they visited were Barcelona, London, Rome, and Venice. They were sometimes accompanied by philanthropists Sydney and Frances Lewis, donors of major collections to the museum.

Near began his work at the VMFA in 1958, and, except for three years (1962-1965) when he did graduate work at Harvard and was a curator at the Cincinnati Art Museum, he served at the VMFA in Richmond the remainder of his life. In the early years, when the museum was run by a director and a curator with a small staff, Near became the first full-time curator of the Virginia Museum of Fine Arts, one of the first state-supported art museums in the United States.

Pinkney Near died August 29, 1990, of pneumonia at a hospital in Hartford, Connecticut, where he and his wife were visiting relatives. He was 63. His memorial service was held at St. Paul's Episcopal Church in Richmond, Virginia, where he lived.

== Curator of the Cincinnati Museum of Art ==
In 1964 Pinkney Near, curator of paintings, selected American paintings for the Cincinnati Museum's survey exhibition, ranging from early painters such as John Trumbull, Gilbert Stuart, and Washington Allston to later painters John Marin, Max Weber, George Bellows, Childe Hassam, Robert Vickrey, Marsden Hartley, Stuart Davis, Mark Tobey, Jane Freilicher, Milton Avery, and Tom Wesselmann.

== Curator of the Virginia Museum of Fine Arts ==
Pinkney Near first came to the VMFA in 1954 for a brief visit, when he had just returned from Paris where he studied Romanesque sculpture with his Fulbright Scholarship. A year later, in 1955 he left the museum for a Sachs fellowship which sponsored further study in Europe. However, it was during this brief stay that he began the evolution of the Collections Division, and, when he returned in 1956 at the age of 29, he became curatorial assistant at the museum. Two years later he was promoted to curator but decided to pursue his graduate work at Harvard. When he returned, he became Chief Curator. Pinkney Near served as VMFA curator for 30 years, much of that time as chief administrative curator. In 1988 Near was named to the newly created post of Paul Mellon Curator and senior research curator, a post in which he worked closely with the Mellon Collection and with Paul Mellon, who provided important gifts of art, both paintings and sculpture portraying animals, to the museum.

Through the years Near acquired for the museum some of its greatest treasures, including paintings by Théodore Géricault, Claude Lorrain's "Battle on a Bridge," Aristide Maillol's "The River," Claude Monet's "Irises by the Pond," Charles Willson Peale's "William Smith and His Grandson," Angelica Kauffmann's "Cornelia Pointing to Her Children as Her Treasures," and Jean-Bapiste Blin de Fontenay's monumental "Buffet Under a Trellis."

In 1976 Near announced the VMFA's purchase of American sculptor Isamu Noguchi's polished stainless steel sculpture "Open Lock," completed in 1964. In 1982 Chief curator Near announced the acquisition of a 42" bronze cast of Jean-Baptiste Carpeaux's Genius of the Dance.

Among the exhibits curated by Near was one called Three Masters of Landscape: Fragonard, Robert and Boucher which, although small, presented interesting issues due to the variability of the works. The exhibit made use of a recently acquired work by Jean Honore Fragonard entitled "Landscape With Three Washerwomen".

== Research and publications ==
Pinkney Near wrote The Whistlers:A Family Reunion, published in 1965 by the Cincinnati Museum of Art, followed in 1981 by Three Masters of Landscape: Fragonard, Robert, and Boucher, which was published by the Virginia Museum of Fine Arts. While at the VMFA, the museum also published his book Apollo. In 1985, his book French Paintings was published by the University of Virginia Press.

Near, along with two other art experts, Julien Binford (professor emeritus at Mary Washington College in Fredericksburg, Virginia) and William Campbell (Curator of American Paintings at the National Gallery of Art in Washington) selected the paintings by the deceased artist Gari Melchers for permanent display in the Gari Melchers Memorial Gallery at Belmont, the Falmouth, Virginia, home of the artist.

Near was an author of many of the VMFA exhibition catalogs and illustrated books, including French Paintings: The Collection of Mr. and Mrs. Paul Mellon.

== List of major works ==
- Near, Pinkney L, and John Rewald. French Paintings: The Collection of Mr. and Mrs. Paul Mellon in the Virginia Museum of Fine Arts. Richmond: The Museum, 1985. ISBN 9780917046193
- Near, Pinkney L, Jean-Honoré Fragonard, Hubert Robert, and François Boucher. Three Masters of Landscape, Fragonard, Robert, and Boucher: A Loan Exhibition on Display at the Virginia Museum, November 10 to December 27, 1981. Richmond: Virginia Museum of Fine Arts, 1981. ISBN 9780917046117
- Near, Pinkney L. Treasures in the Virginia Museum. Richmond: Virginia Museum, 1974. ISBN 9780813906003
- Near, Pinkney L, and William Blake. William Blake's Illustrations of the Book of Job., 1975.
- Near, Pinkney L. Apollo. Richmond, VA, Virginia Museum of Fine Arts, 1985

== Pinkney Near memorial lectures in art history ==
Following the death of Pinkney Near in 1990 a series of memorial lectures in art history featuring notable art historians was begun at Art6 Gallery in Richmond in his honor. All but the last of the series was presented in the main gallery at Art6. Speakers in the series included Mia Genoni, Suzanne Foley, Robert Hobbs, Matthew Affron, Richard Woodward, Joseph Dye III, Mitchell Merling, Belle Pendleton, and Susanne Kilgore Arnold. The final lecture in the series was given by then VMFA curator of contemporary art John B. Ravenal at the Virginia Museum of Fine Arts, who soon afterward became director at the DeCordova Museum and Sculpture Park.
