= Tom Dreesen =

American actor and stand-up comedian (1939–2026)

- Born: Thomas Eugene Dreesen; September 11, 1939; Harvey, Illinois, US
- Died: June 17, 2026 (aged 86); Los Angeles, California, US
- Occupations: Actor; stand-up comedian
- Years active: 1968–2026

Thomas Eugene Dreesen (September 11, 1939 – June 17, 2026) was an American actor and stand-up comedian. He is known for being the opening act for Frank Sinatra. He also opened for Smokey Robinson, Tony Orlando, Gladys Knight, Sammy Davis Jr. and Liza Minnelli.

== Early life and education ==
Dreesen was born and raised in Harvey, Illinois, a south suburb of Chicago. He attended Thornton Township High School, then served four years in the Navy.

== Career ==
While working as an insurance salesman in 1968, he met Tim Reid through a local Jaycee chapter, and the two teamed up as Tim and Tom, the first biracial stand-up comedy duo in the United States. Shortly thereafter, they sought the assistance of radio personality Vince Sanders, who would coach the act and handle some of its business affairs for the next four years.

Though their material is now considered cutting-edge for its time, the pair struggled to make a living together and split up in the mid-1970s. Following the split, each found individual success. While Reid landed a major role on WKRP in Cincinnati, Dreesen made appearances on Match Game and became a regular on The Tonight Show Starring Johnny Carson, in addition to touring with Frank Sinatra as the singer's opening act. After Sinatra's death, he toured nationally with an autobiographical show, Shoeshines to Sinatra.

Dreesen appeared as an actor in television series Columbo, WKRP in Cincinnati and Murder, She Wrote. He also appeared in films such as Spaceballs, The Rat Pack and Trouble with the Curve.

In 1979, he supported the strike at The Comedy Store in West Hollywood. The strike was settled and the comedians performing there began to get paid. That same year, he also appeared on Beat the Clock.

In 1989, Dreesen released a comedy album, That White Boy's Crazy, through Flying Fish Records. The album was recorded in front of an all-black audience in Harvey, Illinois.

Additional comedy talk shows Dreesen appeared on included The Tonight Show with Jay Leno, Late Night with David Letterman, Late Show with David Letterman, Politically Incorrect, The Late Late Show with Craig Kilborn, The Late Late Show with Craig Ferguson and Byron Allen's Comics Unleashed (his final television appearance).

In 1999, a Golden Palm Star on the Palm Springs Walk of the Stars was dedicated to him.

Dreesen continued to perform and was involved in philanthropic endeavors. He served as an ambassador for the Gary Sinise Foundation for fourteen years. Sinise remembered him as a dear friend and "a U.S. Navy veteran with a tremendously charitable heart." He also hosted an annual golf tournament, the Tom Dreesen Celebrity Classic.

In 2008, Dreesen, Reid and former Chicago Sun-Times sportswriter Ron Rapoport collaborated on the book Tim and Tom: An American Comedy in Black and White.

On June 9, 2020, Post Hill Press published Dreesen's memoir, Still Standing ... My Journey from Streets and Saloons to the Stage, and Sinatra.

== Personal life and death ==
Dreesen died at his home in Los Angeles, California, on June 17, 2026, at age 86.
