= Charles Pinckney =

Charles Pinckney may refer to:

- Charles Pinckney (South Carolina chief justice) (died 1758), father of Charles Cotesworth Pinckney
- Colonel Charles Pinckney (1731–1782), South Carolina politician, loyal to British during Revolutionary War, father of Charles Pinckney, the governor
- Charles Pinckney (governor) (1757–1824), South Carolina governor, drafter of U.S. Constitution, second cousin of Charles Cotesworth Pinckney
- Charles Cotesworth Pinckney (1746–1825), U.S. vice presidential candidate (1800), U.S. presidential candidate (1804 and 1808)
