= Eliza Lucas =

American planter and agriculturalist (1722–1793)

Elizabeth Pinckney (née Lucas; December 28, 1722 – May 27, 1793) was an American farmer. Pinckney transformed agriculture in colonial South Carolina, where she developed indigo as one of its most important cash crops. Its cultivation and processing as dye produced one-third the total value of the colony's exports before the Revolutionary War. The manager of three plantations, Pinckney had a major influence on the colonial economy.

Together with her husband Charles Pinckney, Eliza raised a daughter, Harriott Pinckney Horry, and two sons, Charles Cotesworth Pinckney and Thomas Pinckney, who became prominent politicians in South Carolina and were nominated for president and vice president of the United States by the Federalist Party.

== Early life and education ==
Elizabeth (known as Eliza) Lucas was born on December 28, 1722, on the island of Antigua, in the colony of the British Leeward Islands in the Caribbean. Lucas grew up on Poorest, one of her family's three sugarcane plantations on the island. She was the eldest child of Lieutenant Colonel George Lucas, of Dalzell's Regiment of Foot in the British Army, and Ann (probably Meldrum) Lucas. She had two brothers, Thomas and George, and a younger sister Mary (known to her family as Polly).

Colonel and Mrs. Lucas sent all their children to London for schooling. It was customary for elite colonists to send boys to England for their education when they might be as young as 8 or 9. Girls would be sent in their mid-teens when nearing marriageable age. During this period, many parents believed that girls' futures of being wives and mothers made education in more than "the three Rs" and social accomplishments less necessary. But Eliza's ability was recognized. She treasured her education at boarding school, where studies included French and music, but she said her favorite subject was botany. She wrote to her father that she felt her "education, which [she] esteems a more valuable fortune than any [he] could have given [her], … Will make me happy in my future life."

== Move to South Carolina ==
In 1738, the year Eliza would turn 16, Colonel Lucas moved his family from Antigua to South Carolina, where he had inherited three plantations from his father. With tensions increasing between Spain and England, he believed his family would be safer in Carolina than on the tiny, exposed island in the West Indies. Eliza's grandfather, John Lucas, had acquired and developed three tracts of land: Garden Hill, a 1,500-acre plantation producing tar and timber on the Combahee River; a 3,000-acre rice plantation on the Waccamaw River; and the 600-acre Wappoo Plantation along Wappoo Creek—a tidal creek that connected the Ashley and Stono Rivers. They chose to reside at Wappoo, which was 17 miles by land to Charleston (then known as Charles Town) and six miles by river.

In 1739, Colonel Lucas had to return to his post in Antigua to deal with the political conflict between England and Spain. He was appointed lieutenant governor of the island. England's involvement in the War of the Austrian Succession thwarted his attempts to move back to South Carolina with his family. Eliza's letters to him show that she regarded her father with great respect and deep affection, and demonstrate that she acted as head of the family in terms of managing the plantations. Her mother and sister Polly returned to Antigua to be with Colonel Lucas in 1744, at which time Colonel Charles Pinckney proposed to Eliza and they were married. The plantations were heavily mortgaged by her father to attain higher rank in the military. He arranged a lease of their home on Wappoo Creek before his wife and daughter departed. An arrangement was made with Pinckney to have only a small dowry settlement of all rights to the indigo crop there from Wappoo (According to the letterbook of Eliza Lucas Pinckney xvi, xi).

== Career ==
Eliza was 16 years old when she became responsible for managing Wappoo Plantation and its 20 slaves, plus supervising overseers at the other two Lucas plantations. In addition, she supervised care for her younger sister, as their two brothers were still in school in London. As was customary, she recorded her decisions and experiments by copying letters in a letter book. This letter book is one of the most impressive collections of personal writings of an 18th-century American woman. It gives insight into her mind and into the society of the time.

From Antigua, Colonel Lucas sent Eliza various types of seeds for trial on the plantations. They and other planters were eager to find crops for the uplands that could supplement their cultivation of rice. First, she experimented with ginger, cotton, alfalfa and hemp. Starting in 1739, she began experimenting with cultivating and improving strains of the indigo plant, for which the expanding textile market created demand for its dye. When Colonel Lucas sent Eliza indigofera seeds in 1740, she expressed her "greater hopes" for them, as she intended to plant them earlier in the season.

After three years of persistence and many failed attempts, Eliza proved that indigo could be successfully grown and processed in South Carolina. While she had first worked with an indigo processing expert from Montserrat, she was most successful in processing dye with the expertise of an indigo maker of African descent whom her father hired from the French West Indies.

Eliza used her 1744 crop to make seed and shared it with other planters, leading to an expansion in indigo production. She proved that colonial planters could make a profit in an extremely competitive market. Due to her successes, the volume of indigo dye exports increased dramatically from 5,000 pounds in 1745–46, to 130,000 pounds by 1748. Indigo became second to rice as the colony's commodity cash crop and contributed greatly to the wealth of its planters. Before the Revolutionary War, indigo accounted for more than one-third of the value of exports from the American colonies.

== Writings ==
From the time that she began her life in South Carolina on Wappoo Plantation to the time that she died in 1793, Eliza carefully copied all her conversations and letters into a "letter-book." She organized her writings into multiple volumes, each depicting with great detail a different period during her life. The volumes recount most of her life, with the bulk of her writings referring to the time between 1739 and 1762.

The first few volumes range from 1739 to 1746. They begin with her description of her family's move to the plantation in South Carolina when she was 16 years old. Throughout these years, she began to experiment with the indigo seeds along with others that her father had sent to her. Her letters describe several years of her experiments on the crop to make it successful. They also detail her marriage to longtime friend and neighbor Charles Pinckney in 1744.

The second set of volumes covers 1753 to around 1757. By this time, Eliza and Charles had begun their new life together and had children. These sets reference the time she and her family moved to London for her husband's job. They lived there for about five years while Charles worked as the commissioner of the South Carolina colony.

The third set of volumes covers 1758 through 1762. It corresponds with the family's return to South Carolina and soon after, the death of her husband. She was in charge of overseeing her family's plantations along with her late husband's as well. She lived as a widow for more than 30 years until her death in 1793 while she was searching for a cure for breast cancer. Though she continued to keep copies of her letters after her husband died, very few of them remain today.

This letter-book is one of the most complete collections of writing from 18th century America and provides a valuable glimpse into the life of an elite colonial woman living during this time period. Her writings detail goings on at the plantations, her pastimes, social visits, and even her experiments with indigo over several years. Many scholars consider this letter-book important because it describes everyday life over an extended period of time rather than a singular event in history. Eliza passed her letter-book on to her daughter Harriott, who in turn passed it to her daughter. It was passed down from mother to daughter well into the 20th century, at which point the Lucas-Pinckney family donated it to the South Carolina Historical Society.

== Personal life ==
Eliza knew independence at a very young age. Her determination to stay independent carried over into her personal life. Her father presented two potential suitors—both wealthy, connected, South Carolina socialites—to Eliza in the years before she fell in love with and married Charles Pinckney. Eliza rejected both suitors, which was unusual in 18th-century colonial America.

Eliza and Charles Pinckney, a planter on a neighboring plantation, became attached after the death of his first wife. Eliza had been very close to the couple before his wife's death. They were married on May 25, 1744. She was 21 years old and took her family responsibilities seriously, vowing:

to make a good wife to my dear Husband in all its several branches; to make all my actions Correspond with that sincere love and Duty I bear him… I am resolved to be a good mother to my children, to pray for them, to set them good examples, to give them good advice, to be careful both of their souls and bodies, to watch over their tender minds.

Mr. Pinckney had studied law in England and had become a politically active leader in the colony. He was South Carolina's first native-born attorney and served as advocate general of the Court of Vice-Admiralty, justice of the peace for Berkeley County, and attorney general. He was elected as a member of the Commons House of Assembly and Speaker of that body intermittently from 1736 to 1740, and he was a member of the Royal Provincial Council. Eliza was unlike many women of her time, as she was "educated, independent, and accomplished." When the Pinckneys lived in Charleston, Eliza planted oaks and magnolias at their mansion overlooking the bay, and she corresponded regularly with major British botanists.

The couple had three sons and a daughter: Charles Cotesworth (1746–1825), George Lucas, Harriott Pinckney (1749–1830), and Thomas (1750–1828). George Lucas Pinckney died soon after birth in June 1747. In 1753, the family moved to London for five years. Shortly after their return in 1758 to South Carolina, Charles Pinckney contracted malaria and died. Widowed, Eliza continued to manage their extensive plantations, in addition to the Lucas holdings. Most of her agricultural experiments took place before this time.

The surviving Pinckney sons became influential leaders. Charles was a signatory of the United States Constitution and was the Federalist vice-presidential candidate in 1800. In 1804 and 1808, he was the Federalist candidate for president. Thomas was appointed minister to Spain, where he negotiated Pinckney's Treaty in 1795, guaranteeing American navigation rights on the Mississippi River to New Orleans. He was the Federalist vice presidential candidate in 1796. Harriott married Daniel Horry and lived at Hampton Plantation, now a South Carolina State Historic Site.

Eliza Lucas Pinckney died of cancer in Philadelphia in 1793. President George Washington served as a pallbearer at her funeral at St. Peter's Church in Philadelphia where she had traveled for treatment.

== Honors and legacy ==
- 1753 - Pinckney was granted an audience with Augusta, the Dowager Princess of Wales, in London. She presented the princess with a dress made of silk produced on the Pinckney plantations.
- 1989 - For her contributions to South Carolina's agriculture, she became the first woman to be inducted into the South Carolina Business Hall of Fame.
- 2008 - Inducted into the South Carolina Hall of Fame
- Constance Schulz created a documentary edition of her collected letters that was published in 2012.

== In popular culture ==
Natasha Boyd published The Indigo Girl, a novel about Eliza Lucas, in 2017.
