= Georgia Litwack =

American photographer (1922–2020)

- Born: Georgia Shuset; January 27, 1922; Pittsburgh, Pennsylvania, US
- Died: May 10, 2020 (aged 98); Auburndale, Massachusetts, US
- Occupation: Photographer

Georgia Shuset Litwack (January 27, 1922 – May 10, 2020) was an American photographer and photojournalist, best known for her portraits of notable women in the arts, science and technology.

== Early life ==
Georgia Shuset was born in Pittsburgh, the daughter of Jacob Shuset and Rose Katz Shuset. Her parents were Jewish immigrants from Eastern Europe who ran a candy business. She graduated from the University of Pittsburgh in 1942. She later studied photography with Minor White at the Massachusetts Institute of Technology.

== Career ==
After college, Shuset worked as a staff writer for the United Press. As a wife and mother in the Boston area, she had public relations jobs at the Boston Children's Museum and the Museum of Science, and contributed photographs and articles to The Boston Globe. As her photography practice became more advanced, she began teaching classes in the subject at Radcliffe, at the DeCordova Museum School of Art in Lincoln, and in workshops for various audiences throughout greater Boston.

Litwack's photography projects included Born Early: The Story of a Premature Baby (1983), a book and exhibit documenting a baby's first months, with pediatrician Mary Ellen Avery as co-author; and portraits of notable women in arts, science and technology, exhibited several times and now in the collection of the Schlesinger Library. Her subjects included art educator Elma Lewis, physicist Margaret MacVicar, poet Maxine Kumin, anthropologist Sarah Blaffer Hrdy, computer scientist Shafira Goldwasser, and physicist Mildred Dresselhaus. She contributed photographs to the calendar Jewish Women Around the World. She was working on a project about photographer Jessie Tarbox Beals at the time of her death.

== Personal life ==
Georgia Shuset married lawyer John Litwack in 1945. They lived in Newton, Massachusetts, and had two daughters, Deborah and Helen. Her husband died in 2010. Georgia Litwack died in 2020 from COVID-19, in Auburndale, Massachusetts, at age 98. Her papers are housed at the Schlesinger Library.
