= Governor Pinckney =

Governor Pinckney may refer to:

- Charles Pinckney (governor) (1757–1824), 37th Governor of South Carolina
- Thomas Pinckney (1750–1828), 36th Governor of South Carolina
