= Tim and Tom =

American comedy duo

Comedy career
- Medium: Stand-up, television
- Subjects: Race, ethnicity, America, race relations

Tim and Tom were an American comedy duo made up of Tim Reid and Tom Dreesen. DuPont marketing manager Reid and insurance salesman Dreesen met at a Junior Chamber of Commerce meeting near Chicago in 1968. They were "put together to promote an anti-drug program in the local schools" and, prompted by a comment from a child, decided to form a comedy team. The team, later billed as "Tim & Tom", was the first interracial comedy duo (Reid is African-American and Dreesen is white). Years later, Reid and Dreesen co-wrote a book about those years called Tim & Tom: An American Comedy in Black and White (ISBN 978-0-226-70900-0, co-written with sports writer Ron Rapoport).

A 1970 Jet article stated that the comedy duo were good examples of racial cooperation and had received national attention "in persuading young people against the use of drugs".
