= DeCordova Sculpture Park and Museum =

Contemporary art museum in Lincoln, Massachusetts

deCordova Sculpture Park and Museum
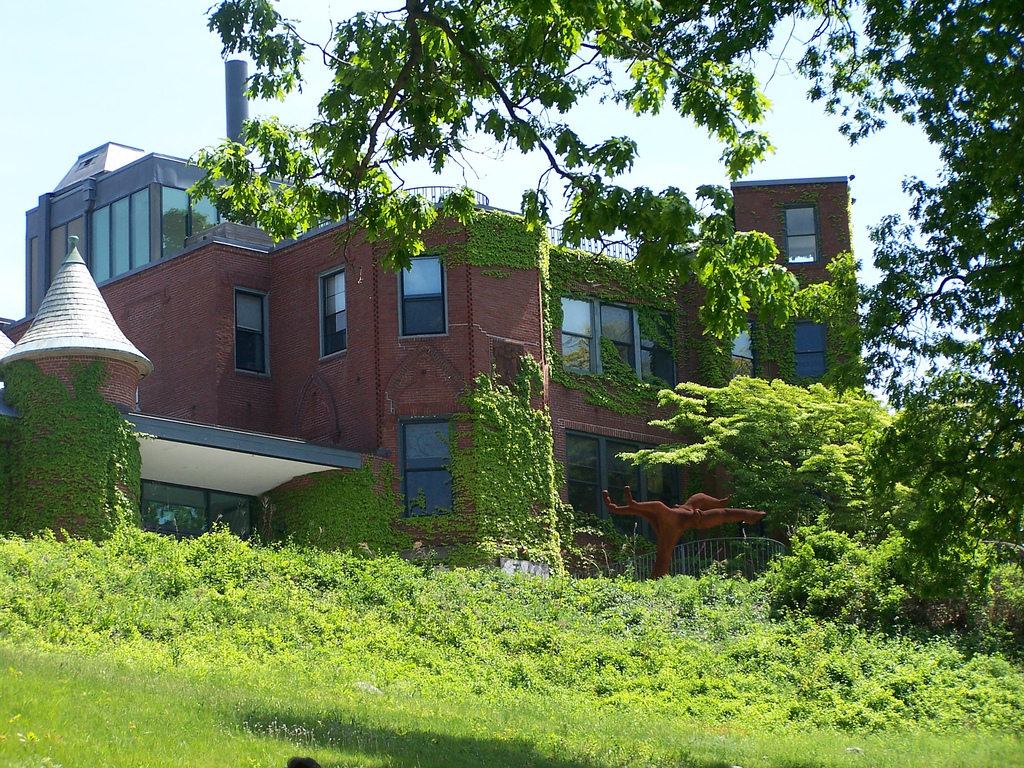

- Location of deCordova in Massachusetts DeCordova Sculpture Park and Museum (the United States)
- Established: 1950
- Location: 51 Sandy Pond Road; Lincoln, Massachusetts; United States
- Coordinates: 42.43108°N 71.31143°W
- Type: Art museum and sculpture park
- Director: Sarah Montross
- Owner: The Trustees of Reservations
- Public transit access: Lincoln stop on the Fitchburg MBTA Line and a 1.5 mile walk
- Website: deCordova Sculpture Park and Museum

The deCordova Sculpture Park and Museum is a sculpture park and contemporary art museum on the southern shore of Flint's Pond in Lincoln, Massachusetts, 20 miles northwest of Boston. It was established in 1950 and encompasses 30 acres.

Providing a constantly changing landscape of large-scale, outdoor, modern and contemporary sculpture and site-specific installations, the Sculpture Park displays more than 60 works, most on loan to the museum. Inside, the museum features rotating exhibitions. DeCordova's permanent collection focuses on works in all media, with particular emphasis on photography and works by artists with connections to New England.

== History ==
deCordova Sculpture Park and Museum is located on the former estate of Julian de Cordova. Independent appraisers determined that de Cordova's collections were not of substantial interest or value, so the collection was sold and the proceeds were used to create a museum of regional contemporary art. The Trustees reached this decision after they noticed the near absence of modern art exhibitions in the Boston area, and the lack of venues for works by regional contemporary artists. When it officially opened in 1950 as the deCordova and Dana Museum, it was the only museum to focus its exhibitions and collecting activities on living New England artists, while also offering an educational program in the visual arts.

The founding director was Frederick P. Walkey, a graduate of the School of the Museum of Fine Arts, Boston. He aggressively organized an exhibition schedule and arts instruction program with a clear educational mandate. DeCordova established a reputation for ground-breaking exhibitions that introduced New England audiences to important trends within contemporary art both regionally and nationally, including Pop Art and Boston's post-war expressionist movement. It changed its name to the deCordova Museum and Sculpture Park in around 1989. Georgia Litwack taught photography courses at the deCordova.

In 2019, deCordova was acquired by The Trustees of Reservations, a land conservation and historic preservation non-profit.

DeCordova is under the direction of Sarah Montross, Museum Director and Chief Curator. Prior directors of deCordova include Michael Busack and John Ravenal, who was appointed in 2015.

In 2023, the museum building was closed to permit an upgrade to its HVAC (Heating, Ventilation, and Air Conditioning) systems, which was expected to last for two to three years. The outdoor sculpture park remains open.

== Architecture ==
The New England architect John Quincy Adams designed the extensive renovations that transformed Julian de Cordova's mansion into a public museum prior to its opening in 1950. The lower floors housed galleries, while the third floor offered studio art classes. The School attracted hundreds of students, eventually overwhelming the limited space within the Museum. In 1966, deCordova constructed a complex of four studio buildings to accommodate its expanded educational programs and meet the equipment standards of a professional art studio. In the early 1980s, the Museum consolidated and renovated two existing buildings to form administrative offices for the School and its outreach programs.

In 1998, the institution completed the New Century Campaign for deCordova, an $8 million effort to upgrade its building. Kallmann McKinnell & Wood modernized and expanded deCordova’s educational facilities to include a new studio, a store, and a gallery dedicated to exhibitions by School instructors and students. The Museum’s exhibition space was expanded with a 20,000 square foot addition and a roof terrace to provide views of the Park. The main galleries were renovated to install a climate control system, a café, and a library.

== Art ==
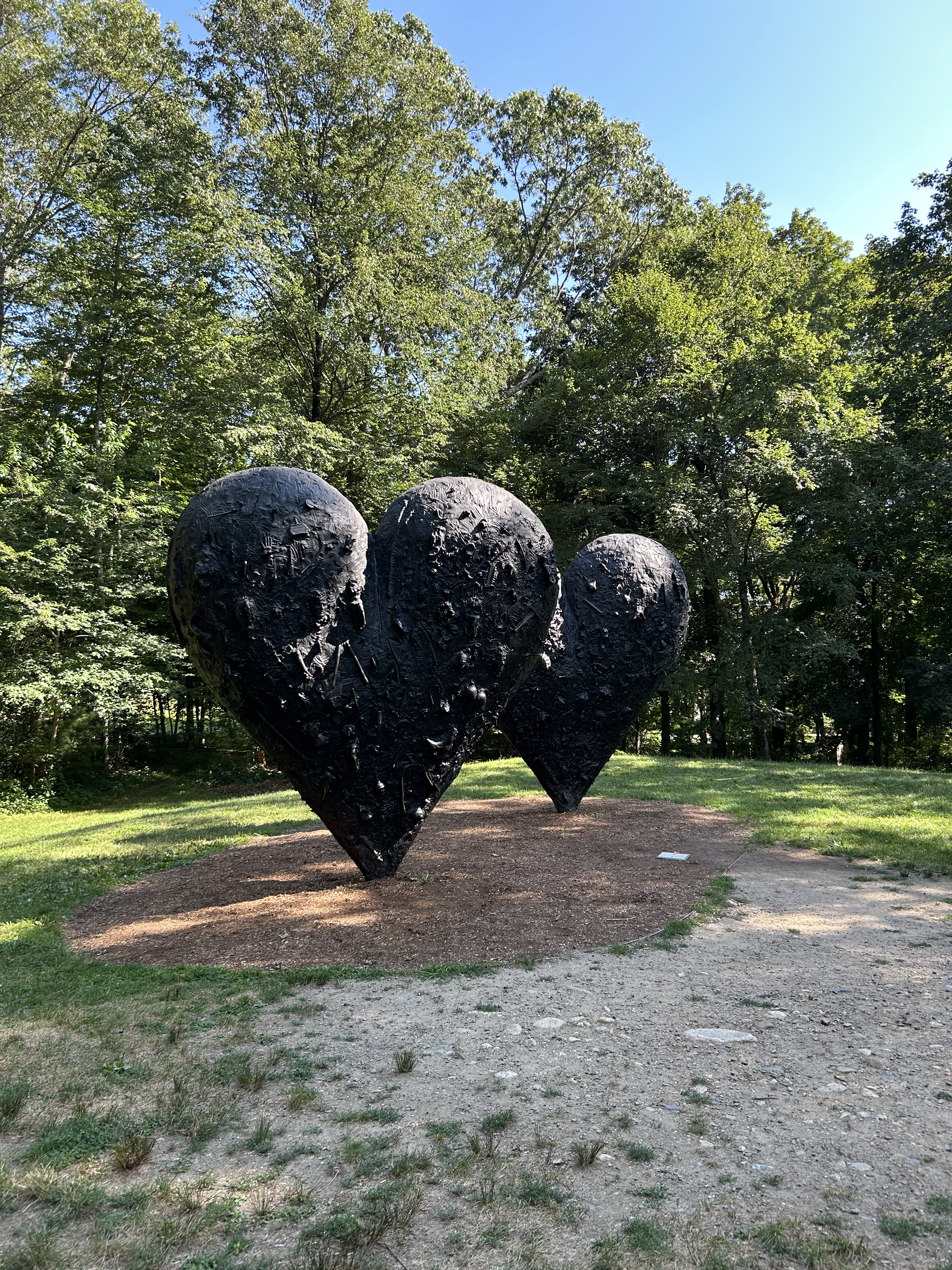
Two Big Black Hearts by Jim Dine

DeCordova's emphasis on modern and contemporary art fueled its rapid popularity during the 1950s and 1960s, but by the 1980s, the Museum faced competition from a growing number of local museums, universities, and private galleries all of which shared a similar artistic mission. With the arrival of director Paul Master-Karnik in 1982, deCordova initiated a series of curatorial programs to further strengthen its commitment to New England’s contemporary artists. Master-Karnik introduced the Annual Exhibition, formerly Artist/Visions, which featured works by emerging New England artists and provided an annual snapshot of regional talent.

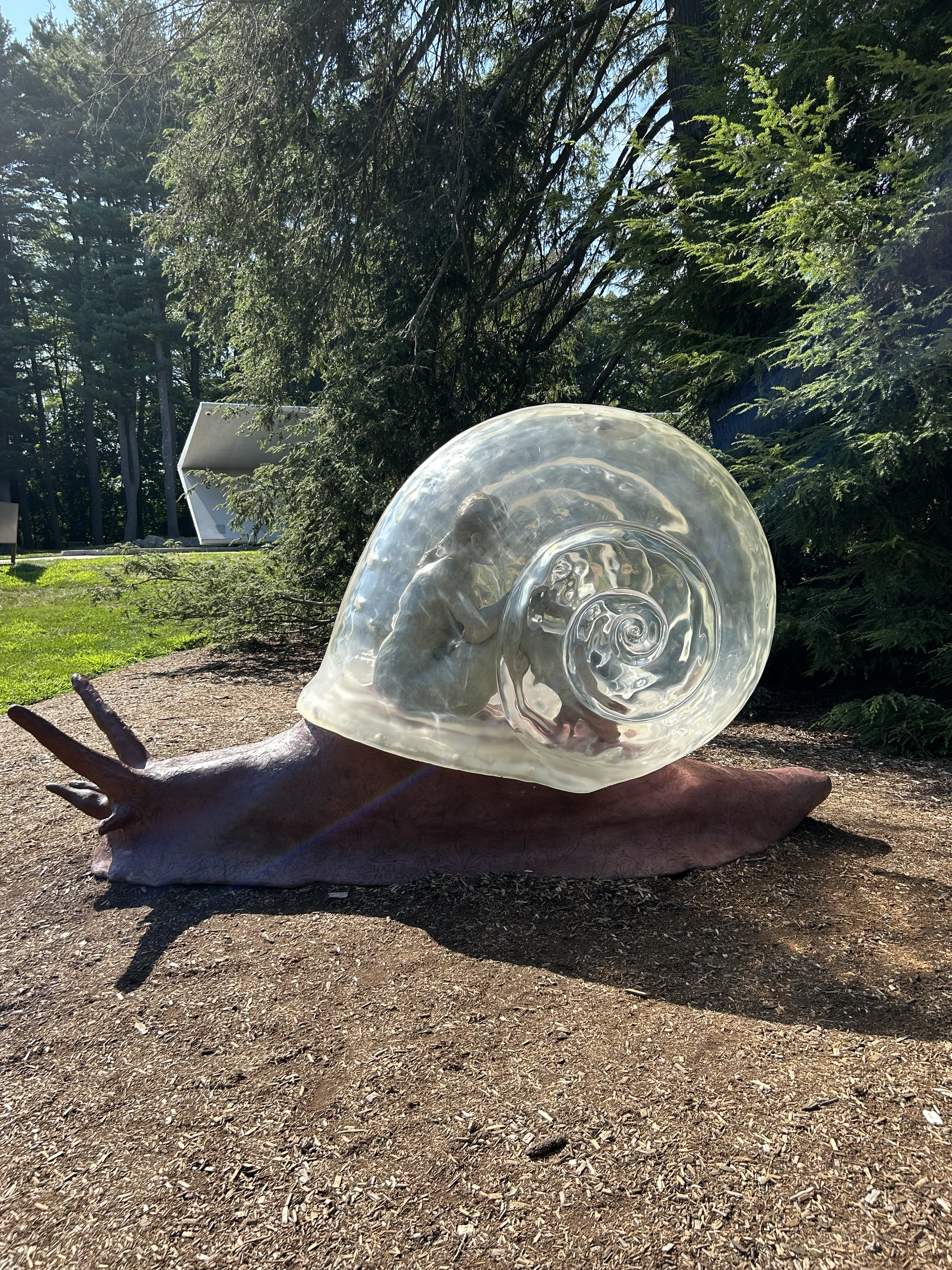
A Snail’s Pace by Kathy Ruttenberg

To maintain the institution’s connection to New England and its support for local emerging artists, former director Dennis Kois (appointed in 2008) established the PLATFORM series, an ongoing exhibition series of site-specific installations by New England artists. In 2010 the deCordova Biennial replaced the Annual Exhibition series to expand the curatorial voice, allowing for an advisory board and co-curator opportunities. Now occurring every other year, the deCordova Biennial displays New England’s leading emerging to mid-career artists, emphasizing the quality and vitality of the art created in this region.

In order to emphasize its focus, the Museum officially changed its name in 2009 from deCordova Museum and Sculpture Park to deCordova Sculpture Park and Museum. The landscaped lawns, forests, fields, and terraces of deCordova's Sculpture Park reveal a cross-section of how contemporary artists work outdoors, and how outdoor art enters into complex dialogues with sites and environmental conditions. This is accomplished with a three-tiered program of collection works, loans, and site-specific projects and commissions. The collection includes works by significant twentieth- and twenty-first-century artists that provide an art-historical context for other work in the park, and include sculptures by Dorothy Dehner, Antony Gormley, Dan Graham, Hugh Hayden, Sol LeWitt, Beverly Pepper, Jaume Plensa, Ursula von Rydingsvard, and John Wilson. Artists with sculptures on loan to deCordova include Jim Dine, Paul Matisse, Kathy Ruttenberg, and Arlene Shechet. Site-specific projects and special installations designed and implemented especially for the Sculpture Park have included works by Orly Genger, Maren Hassinger, Leeza Meksin, and many more. In 2019, deCordova completed work on Watershed, a permanent installation by sculptor Andy Goldsworthy.

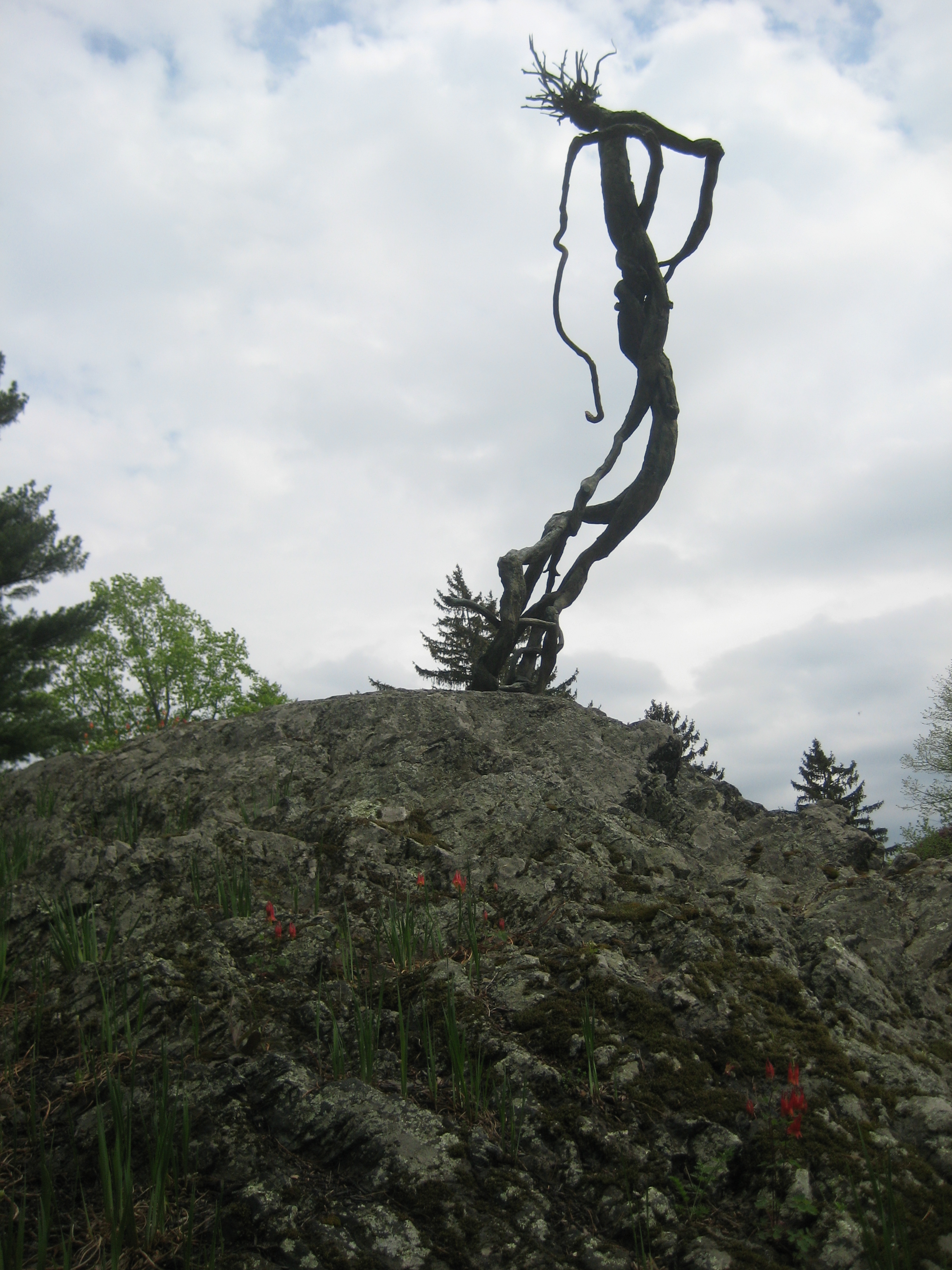

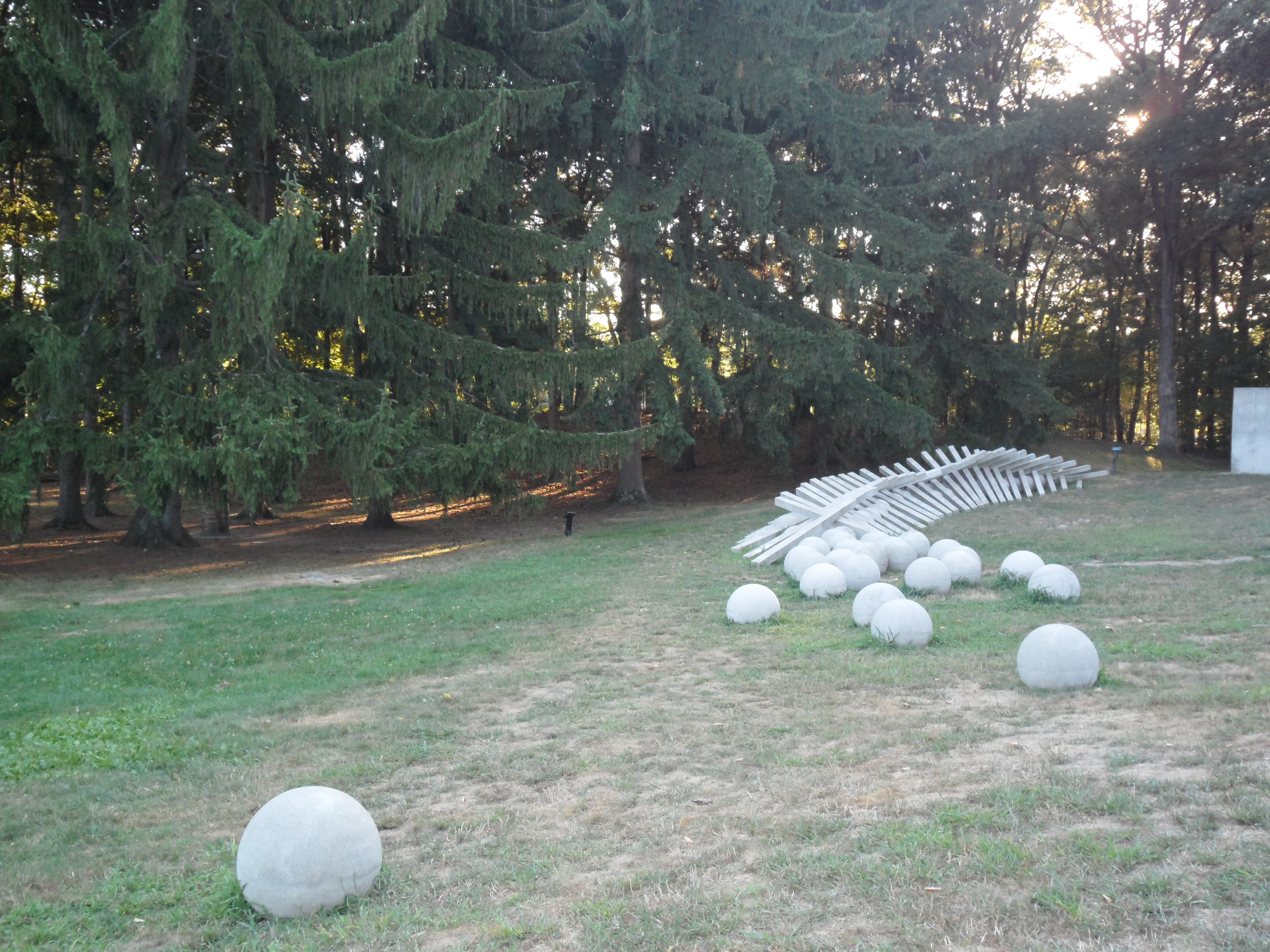
Butterfly Effect Movement 6

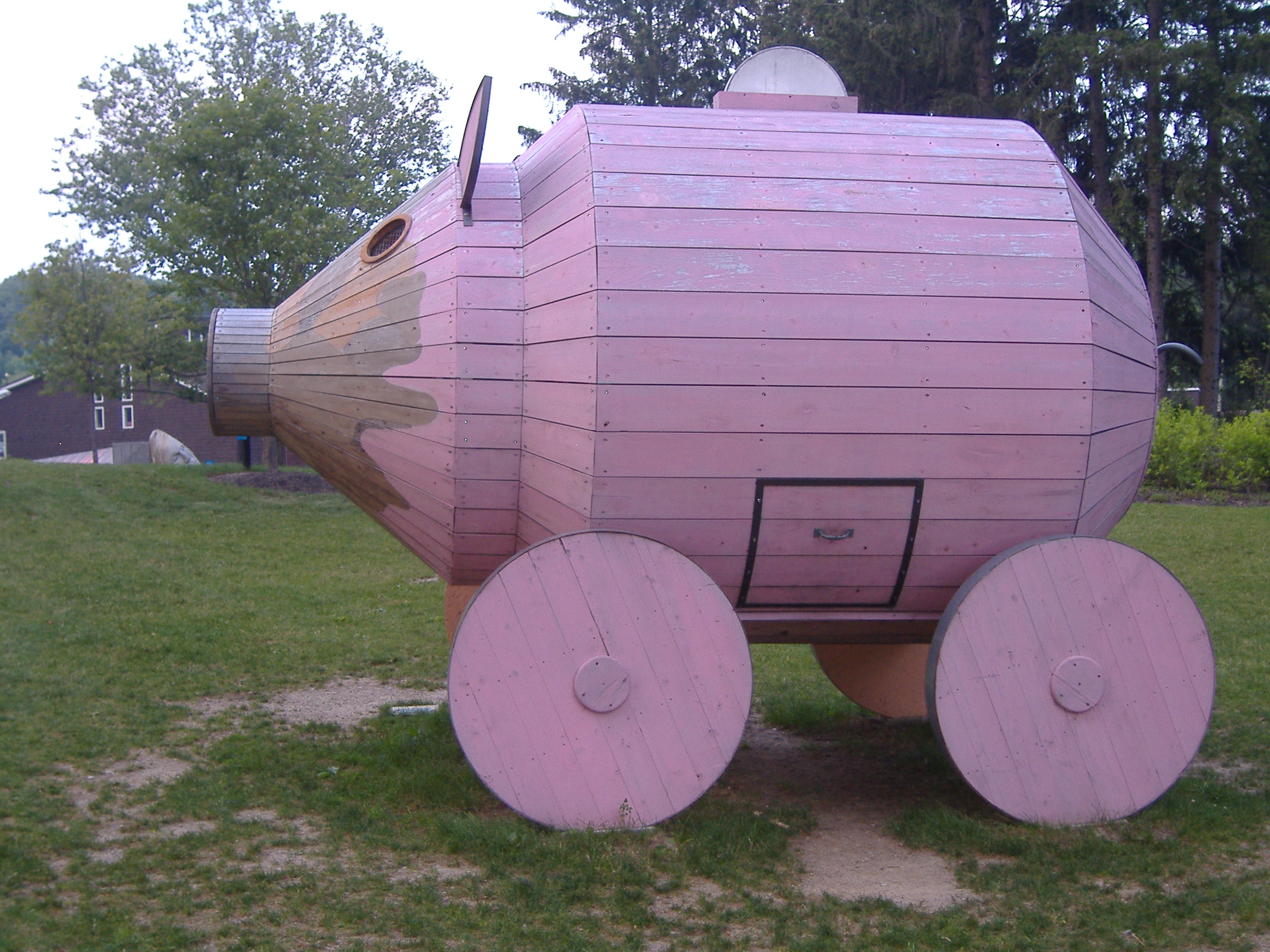
Trojan Pig
