= Ron Pinkney =

American sports announcer and commentator (1935–2020)

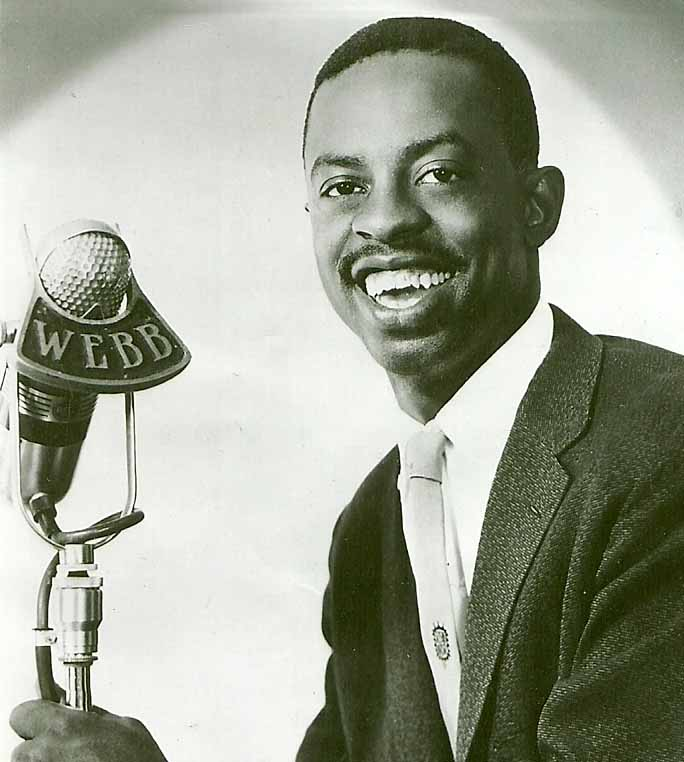
- Ron Pinkney, WEBB Radio Disc Jockey, 1960
- Born: Robert Theron Pinkney; May 26, 1935; Washington, D.C., U.S.
- Died: May 27, 2020 (aged 85)
- Presenting career
- Country: United States of America

Robert Theron "Ron" Pinkney (May 26, 1935 – May 27, 2020) was an American pioneer broadcaster who was the first African-American play-by-play announcer on a major television network (ABC). The game was played at the Memorial Stadium in Jackson, Mississippi between Mississippi Valley State and Jackson State.

== Early life and education ==
Ron Pinkney was born to Robert Pinkney and Catherine Staton at Freedmans Hospital in Washington, D.C., on Sunday, May 26, 1935. He was raised in Annapolis, Maryland and attended Stanton Elementary School and graduated from Bates High School in Annapolis. He attended Morgan State University in Baltimore and later the Baltimore School of Engineering.

== Journalist and radio career ==
Pinkney's first journalist job was an Annapolis correspondent for the Baltimore Afro-American newspaper in 1955.

His first broadcasting job was on radio station WANN in Annapolis, MD. He was a Dee Jay at WEBB in Baltimore, MD from 1960 to 1962.

In 1963, while a deejay in Maryland, he began a career in sportscasting at his alma mater, Bates High School. He hosted two daily sports shows and did play by play at football and basketball games. He did his first college broadcasts at Maryland State (University of MD-Eastern Shore) and Delaware State University in 1964. Coach Vernon "Skip" McClain's MSU Hawks teams were aired twice on WANN Radio in Annapolis. The Hawks were Black College Football National champions during this era. Pinkney became the Drive Time morning newscaster at WOL, the top-rated station in the Washington, DC metropolitan area. He later was promoted to news director and employed three other on-air newscasters.

From 1968 to 1970, he was the voice of Morgan State football on WEBB, when the Golden Bears were coached by head coach Earl Banks, and featured future NFL stars Raymond Chester (Oakland Raiders), CB Mark Washington (Dallas Cowboys) and prominent alumnus William Rhoden, a track star, and New York Times columnist. The Bears enjoyed a 33-game winning streak from 1967 to 1970 when Sam Lacy, Afro-American newspapers, sportswriter George Taliaferro, a former star halfback and Big Ten All-American at Indiana (NFL Baltimore Colts), and Ralph Jones (son of Grambling president R.W.E. Jones) were color commentators in the broadcasting booth.

== Television years ==
Pinkney was the first black sportscaster to work a televised broadcast when he covered the famed Orange Blossom Classic, the Black college football spectacular set in Miami, Florida in the Orange Bowl arena. It was a closed circuit television production pitting the host Florida A&M University versus Jacksonville State University, Alabama. The FAMU Rattlers Hall of Fame head coach and then athletic director Alonza "Jake" Gaither handpicked him to work with another popular Atlanta broadcaster, Chico Renfro. The game was piped into the campus of the Florida A&M and Jacksonville State University, Alabama (the first white school to play in the All-black classic). Pinkney was hired as a weekend sportscaster at WTTG, channel 5 (Washington, DC) and teamed with Connie Chung, the weekend news anchor and Maury Povich, who anchored the week night sports show. Pinkney hosted a weekly half-hour black news program on Saturday nights from 10:30 pm to 11:00 pm. He later became the weekend sportscaster on the 10:00 pm newscast from 1970 to 1973.

From 1971-1974, Pinkney was brought in to perform play by play duties for the syndicated Grambling University football games. He worked with the iconic sports information director Collie Nicholson, who masterminded the Tigers rise to national prominence. Grambling football was under the guidance of the legendary Hall of fame coach Eddie Robinson, who went on to become one of the top all-time winningest coaches in all of football. He replaced another famous athlete and actor Fred "The Hammer" Williamson who was the lone announcer in 1970. Pinkney assumed the solo role in the Grambling booth in 1971. In 1972, former Dallas Cowboys runningback Don Perkins was added as a color commentator. Los Angeles sports writer Betty Smith, considered the first woman sideline reporter was brought on board. Grambling football games were seen in ninety-four markets on a one-hour taped delay.

In 1974, Pinkney became the Sports Director of the Mutual Black Network in Washington, DC. He was the play by play voice of the MBN Black College Game of the Week. The fourteen-game package was a historic first for Black college sports coverage. Joining the broadcast team were former NFL star Roger Brown in 1975 and Tom Gatewood (Notre Dame)in 1977. The games were aired through 1979. Pinkney was the Sports Director for National Black Network (NBN) from 1979 to 1991.

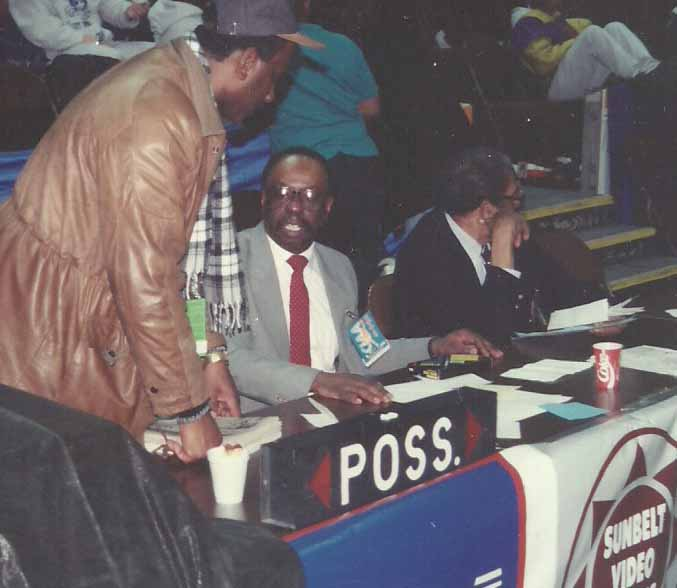
Edd Hayes with Ron Pinkney at CIAA Tournament

ABC TV broadcast three HBCU games with Pinkney and Don Perkins handling the play by play and color commentary, thus earning Pinkney the distinction of being the first African American play by play announcer on a major television network. That game pitted Mississippi Valley State versus Jackson State in Jackson, Mississippi. Pinkney was selected to head the MBN coverage of the 1976 Summer Olympics in Montreal, Canada, and he covered the 1984 Summer Olympics in Los Angeles for National Black Network. (Dr. Leroy T. Walker, North Carolina Central University was named head coach of the US contingency).

In 1978, Pinkney was the color commentator for the CIAA Invitational Tournament held at the Norfolk Scope in Virginia (Les Keiter did play by play). In 1979, NBC-TV was in the second year of coverage of the Black college historic tournament when he did play by play. It was the first regional television broadcast for the Peacock Network and the CIAA. Joining Pinkney in the broadcast booth were ex-North Carolina Central great and Boston Celtics Hall of Famer Sam Jones. The tournament highlight was Virginia Union's men's victory over Norfolk State. Dave Robbins, a white coach, won his first CIAA title which came at the expense of the Spartans under Hall of Fame coach Lucious Mitchell (he guided Kentucky State's men's team to the second three-peat championships in the NAIA history (1970–1972)).

Pinkney finished his fifty-five-year career at Hampton University as the play by play commentator for basketball and football games.

Pinkney was considered a good luck charm for nearly all of the teams he covered as they claimed at least two conference and/or national championships:

- Morgan State 1967-70/Football, Head coach Earl Banks
- Grambling State 1971,'74/Football, Head coach Eddie Robinson
- Hampton University, 1997–98, 2000/Football, Head coach Joe Taylor
- 2001-02/Men's Basketball, Steve Merfeld
- 2003-04/Women's Basketball, Pat Bibbs

== Retirement and death ==
Pinkney retired in 2005 to Hampton, Virginia. He died on May 27, 2020, at the age of 85.

== Ledger ==
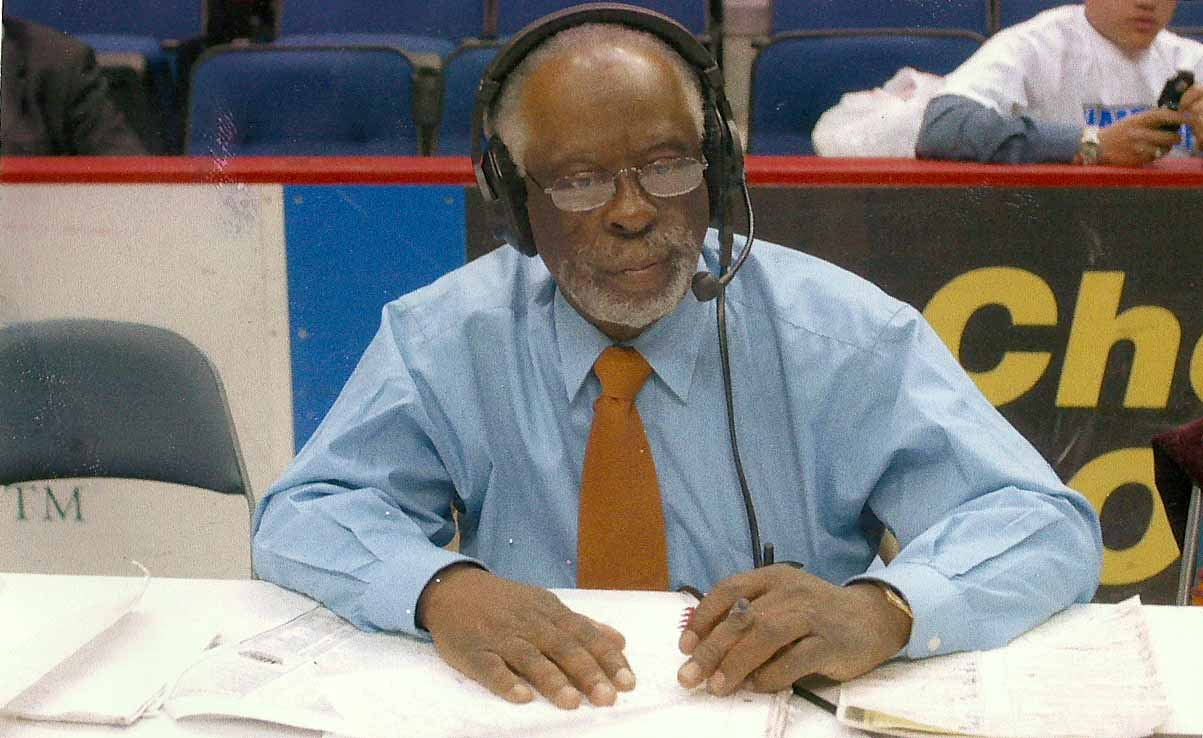
Pinkney doing play by play at the MEAC Tournament, Hampton University 2005

New York Urban League Classics: Pinkney covered the first Whitney M. Young Urban League Classic in Yankee Stadium in 1968. It featured Morgan State vs. Grambling State and was carried by WEBB in Baltimore.

- 1971-75: Hosted Black Associated Sports Enterprise football coverage
- 1983: Did play by play at the Circle City Classic
- 1984: Coverage of BET Game of the Week BET
- 1987-1988: Tempo Television Productions, Oklahoma did CIAA Game of the Week (Hall of Famer Willie Lanier joined him in the booth)
- 1989: National Black Network Sports Director
- 1990: Home Team Sports CIAA Football Game of the Week
- 1993: Atlantic City Holiday Classic, the John B. McLendon, Jr. Invitational (with Jackie Bowe)
- 1996-2005: Hampton University Football and Basketball play by play, WHOV-FM

== Honors ==
- CIAA Sportscaster of the Year, 1974, 1978
- Capital Press Club Award, 1969
- Voice of Radio documentary, the Death of Martin Luther King, 1968
- Honorary Alumnus Award, Grambling University (for television coverage of Grambling football), 1971

== Sources ==
- Virginian Pilot Story of the Week, CIAA Tournament 1979
