= Senator Pinckney (disambiguation) =

Charles Pinckney (governor) (1757–1824) was a U.S. Senator from South Carolina from 1798 to 1801, and also served in the South Carolina State Senate. Senator Pinckney may also refer to:

- Bertine Pinckney (1824–1909), Wisconsin State Senate
- Charles Cotesworth Pinckney (1746–1825), South Carolina State Senate
- Clementa C. Pinckney (1973–2015), South Carolina State Senate

== See also ==
- William Pinkney (1764–1822), U.S. Senator from Maryland from 1819 to 1822
