= Charles Pinckney (South Carolina chief justice) =

Colonial American politician (1699–1758)

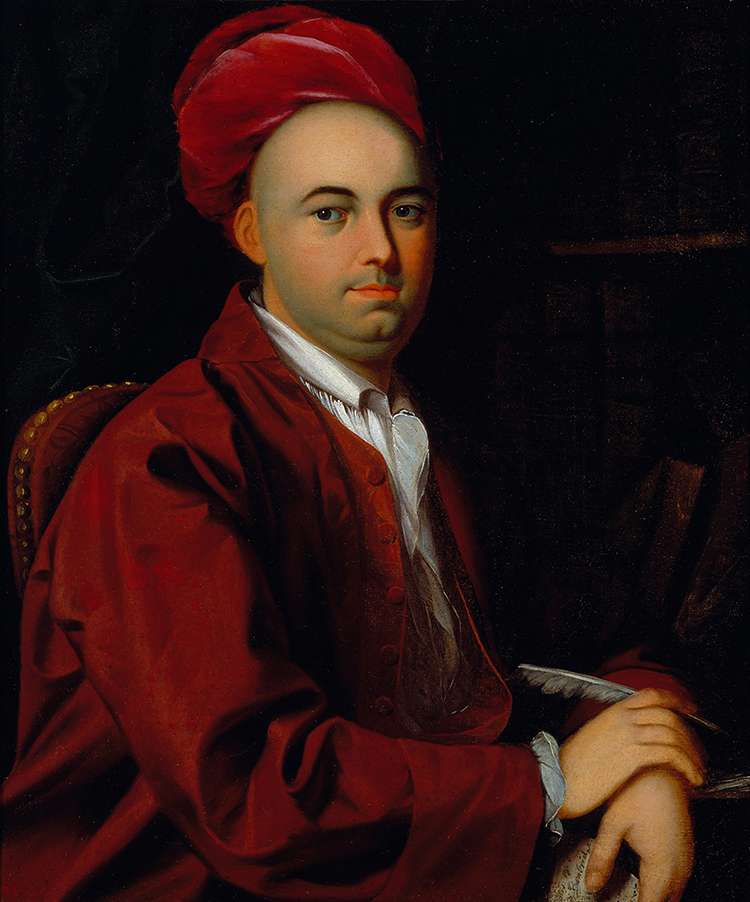

Chief Justice of the South Carolina Supreme Court
- In office 1752–1753
- Preceded by: James Graeme
- Succeeded by: Peter Leigh

Attorney General of South Carolina
- In office 1732–1733
- Preceded by: James Abercrombie
- Succeeded by: James Abercrombie

Personal details
- Born: August 13, 1699 Charles Town, South Carolina, British America
- Died: July 12, 1758 (aged 58) Mount Pleasant, South Carolina, British America
- Spouse: Eliza Lucas
- Children: 4

Charles Pinckney (August 13, 1699 – July 12, 1758) was a South Carolina politician and colonial agent. He was also the father of two candidates for Vice-President and President.

== Early life ==
Pinckney was born in Charleston, South Carolina, in 1699.

== Career ==
Pinckney studied law in England, and had become a politically active leader in the colony. He was South Carolina's first native-born attorney, and served as advocate general of the Court of Vice-Admiralty, justice of the peace for Berkeley County, and attorney general. He was elected as a member of the Commons House of Assembly and Speaker of that body intermittently from 1736–1740, and he was a member of the Royal Provincial Council.

Pinckney also served as attorney general of the Province of South Carolina in 1733, speaker of the assembly in 1736, 1738 and 1740, chief justice of the province in 1752–1753, and agent for South Carolina in England in 1753–1758.

== Personal life ==
In 1744, Pinckney married, as his second wife, Eliza Lucas (1722–1793), the daughter of Lt. Colonel George Lucas, of Dalzell's Regiment of Foot in the British Army. They were the parents of four children, three of whom lived to adulthood:

- Charles Cotesworth Pinckney (1746–1825), a signer of the U.S. Constitution and the Federalist candidate for President in 1804 and 1808 and Vice-President in 1800.
- George Lucas Pinckney (1747–1747), who died in infancy.
- Harriott Pinckney (1748–1830), who married Daniel Horry and lived at Hampton Plantation in McClellanville, South Carolina.
- Thomas Pinckney (1750–1828), who negotiated Pinckney's Treaty with Spain in 1795 and was the Federalist candidate for Vice-President in 1796.

He was the uncle of Colonel Charles Pinckney (1731–1784) and the great-uncle of Governor Charles Pinckney (1757–1824).

Pinckney died on July 12, 1758 in Mount Pleasant, South Carolina.
