= Daniel Horry =

American politician

Member of the South Carolina General Assembly from Charleston
- In office March 26, 1776 – February 12, 1780

Personal details
- Born: 1747
- Died: 1785 (aged 37–38)

Daniel Horry (1747 – 1785) was a South Carolina politician and Revolutionary War military officer.

Horry was the commander of the South Carolina Light Dragoons, a unit of the South Carolina State Troops that was established in February 1779 to fight the British in the American Revolution. He served as a justice of peace, member of the South Carolina General Assembly and a local commissioner.

== Early life ==
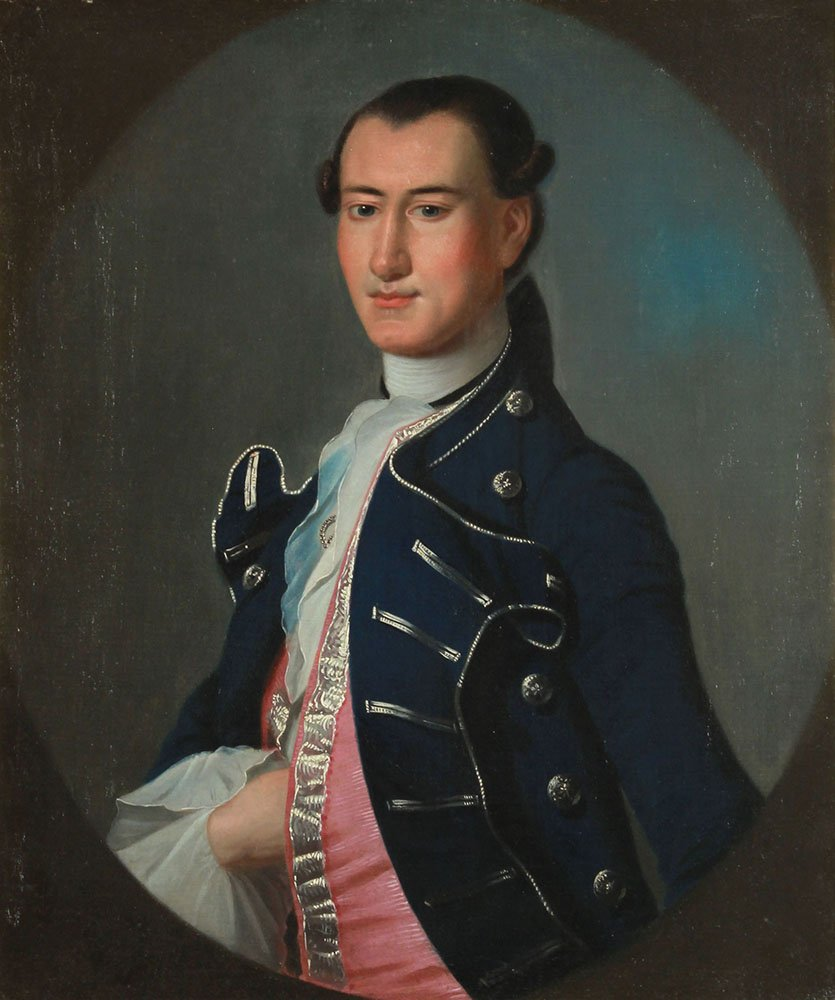
Portrait of Horry's father, Daniel Horry Sr., by Jeremiah Theus, 1757

Daniel was born in the Province of South Carolina about 1747. His father, Daniel Huger Horry (1705-1763), was a prominent French Huguenot plantation owner who lived on the Santee River in South Carolina. Daniel and his wife, Harriott Lucas Pinckney (1748-1830), whom he married in 1768, lived at Hampton Plantation, located north of present-day McClellanville, South Carolina. Harriott Lucas Pinckney was the daughter of South Carolina Chief Justice Charles Pinckney and his wife Eliza Lucas. Daniel and Harriott had two children, Daniel and Harriott.

== Political career ==
Horry served as a member of the South Carolina General Assembly, justice of the peace, and a local commissioner.

== Revolutionary War ==
After the South Carolina Light Dragoons, a unit of the State Troops, was established in February 1779, he served as its first and only colonel. He took over from Major Hezekiah Maham, who was assigned another command. His unit was involved in the following known engagements:

- May 11, 1779, Charleston Neck
- Jun. 20, 1779, Battle of Stono Ferry
- Sep. 16 - Oct. 18, 1779, Siege of Savannah in Georgia
- Feb. 22, 1780, reconnaissance of the British lines near Stono Ferry
- Mar. 6–7, 1780, Ferguson's Plantation
- Mar. 27, 1780, Rantowles Bridge
- Apr. 14, 1780, Battle of Monck's Corner

When the British army defeated American forces and occupied Charleston in 1780, Daniel took British protection to avoid seizure of his extensive properties. In the summer of 1781, he took his young son, Daniel, to London, England to be educated.

== Post-war ==
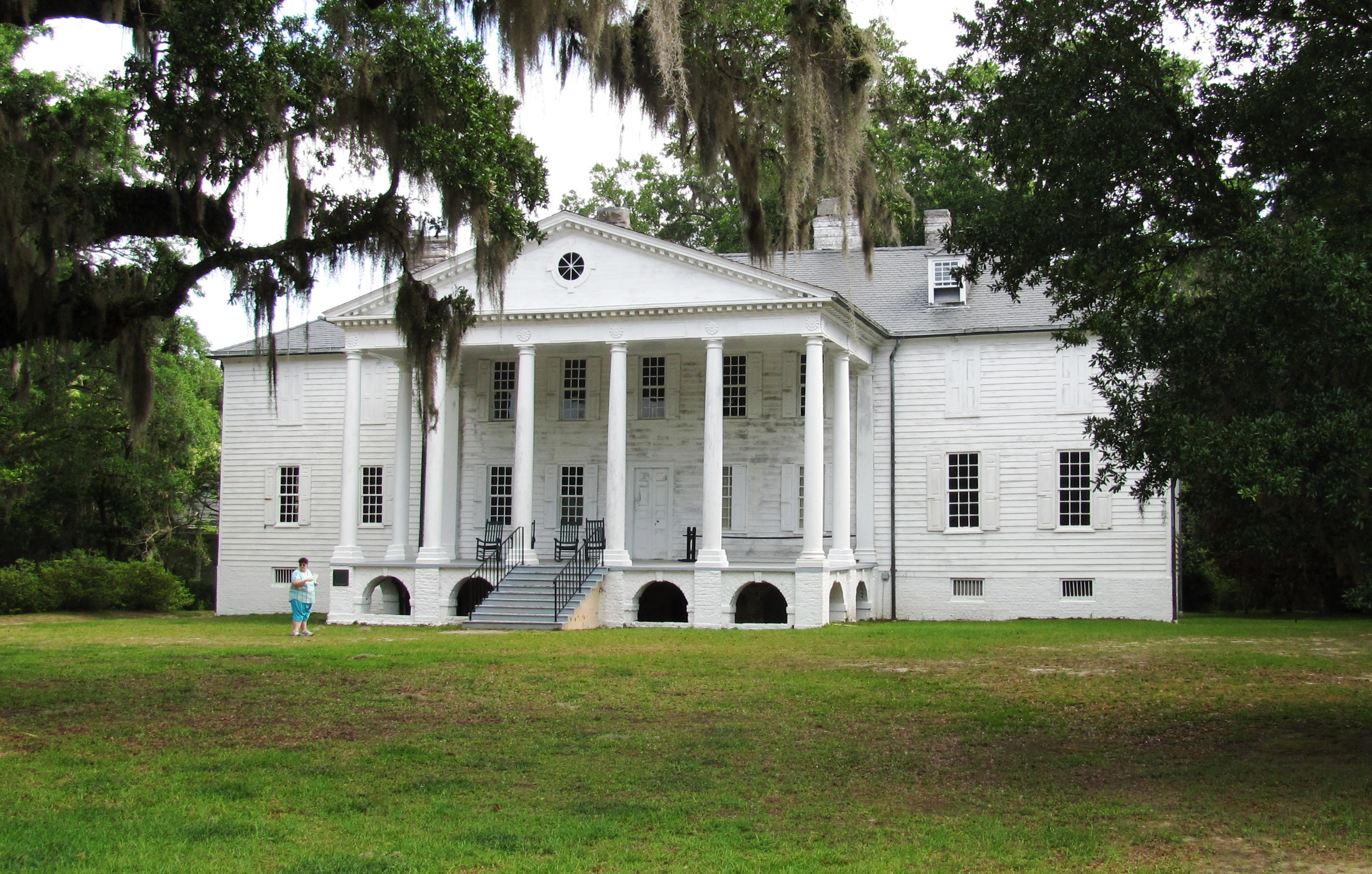
Hampton Plantation, Horry's home

When Charleston returned to patriot control in 1782, Daniel's estate was amerced twelve percent of its total value when Daniel returned to South Carolina. He died there in 1785.

== See also ==
- List of South Carolina militia units in the American Revolution
- Peter Horry (cousin)
