= John Ravenal =

American art historian (born 1959)

John B. Ravenal (born August 1, 1959 in Providence, Rhode Island) is an art historian, writer, and museum curator. Before 1998, he was the Associate Curator of 20th-Century Art at the Philadelphia Museum of Art. From 1998 to 2015 he was curator of contemporary art at the Virginia Museum of Fine Arts in Richmond, Virginia, where he organized exhibitions of Ryan McGinness: Studio Visit (2014); Xu Bing: Tobacco Project(2011), and Sally Mann: The Flesh and The Spirit (2010). He was curator of the VMFA's Jasper Johns and Edvard Munch exhibition, Jasper Johns and Edvard Munch: Love, Loss, and the Cycle of Life. His lecture about the exhibition took place in the Leslie Cheek Theater in the Virginia Museum of Fine Arts. The show opened in November 2016 in partnership with the Munch Museum in Oslo. He is the author of the exhibition catalogue Jasper Johns and Edvard Munch: Inspiration and Transformation.

== Education ==
Ravenal earned his BA in art history from Wesleyan University and his Master of Arts and Master of Philosophy degrees in art history from Columbia University.

== Professional activities ==
His exhibitions for the Philadelphia Museum of Art included commissioned projects by Sherrie Levine, Lawrence Weiner, Richard Long, and Rirkrit Tiravanija; a retrospective of the art of Sidney Goodman; and the first United States museum exhibition by Scottish artist Ian Hamilton Finlay.

He returned to the VMFA for the Johns/Munch exhibition, presenting a lecture about mutual motifs in the works of the two artists, which was preceded by a performance by Norwegian pianist Else Olsen Storesund of the John Cage composition, Perilous Night.

While at the VMFA, where he was the Sydney and Frances Lewis Family Curator of Modern and Contemporary Art, he was a speaker at art6 Gallery in Richmond, Virginia in the lecture series honoring Virginia Museum of Fine Arts curator Pinkney Near.

Also while at the VMFA, Ravenal’s exhibitions included Vanitas: Meditations on Life and Death in Contemporary Art; Outer & Inner Space, a history of video art; Robert Lazzarini’s first solo museum exhibition; and Artificial Light, displayed at VCUarts Anderson Gallery and the Museum of Contemporary Art, North Miami. During his tenure at the VMFA, the museum acquired the Kehinde Wiley painting "Willem van Heythuysen".

Ravenal served as the fourth president of the Association of Art Museum Curators (2009–11).

In 2015 Ravenal became executive director of the DeCordova Museum and Sculpture Park in Lincoln, Massachusetts. His appointment to DeCordova as Executive Director was announced by the Center for Curatorial Leadership, of which he had been a Fellow since 2012. He served in this position until 2020.

Ravenal has contributed to exhibition catalogues and essays about the artist Sol LeWitt and other contemporary artists. He worked on the TV series documentary Art in the Twenty-First Century (2001) and the biographical documentary, Herb & Dorothy 50X50 (2013).

== Bibliography ==
- Sally Mann: The Flesh and the Spirit by John B. Ravenal, John Ravenal, Sally Mann (Photographer).
- Modern & Contemporary Art at the Virginia Museum of Fine Arts.
- Vanitas: Meditations On Life And Death In Contemporary Art
- Outer and Inner Space: Pipilotti Rist, Shirin Neshat, Jane and Louise Wilson, and the History of Video Art by John B. Ravenal, Laura Cottingham, Jonathan Crary
- Jasper Johns and Edvard Munch: Inspiration and Transformation
- The Alumni Show II: Wesleyan University
- Artificial Light: New Light-Based Sculpture and Installation Art by John B. Ravenal, Kathleen Forde
- Twenty Philadelphia Artists: Celebrating Fleisher Challenge At Twenty
- Sidney Goodman: Paintings And Drawings, 1959-95

== Biography ==
John Ravenal is the husband of writer Virginia Pye, the author of River of Dust and Dreams of the Red Phoenix. They have two children, Eva and Daniel.
