= Mutual Black Network =

American radio network (1972–1991)

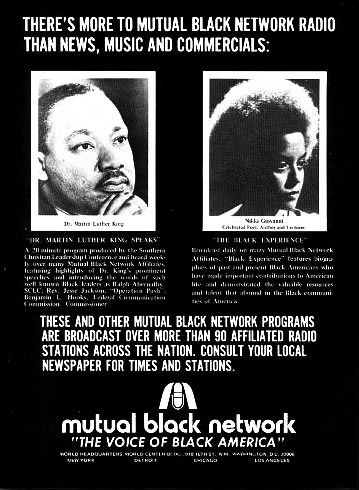
Advertisement for the Mutual Black Network, featuring Dr. Martin Luther King Jr. and poet Nikki Giovanni.

The Mutual Black Network (MBN) was an American radio network founded by the Mutual Broadcasting System on May 1st, 1972 as the first national full-service radio network aimed at African Americans.

== Programming ==
The network broadcast an hourly five-minute newscast at 50 minutes past the hour. It also aired sports, medical, finance, commentary and feature programs, and for one year beginning in the spring of 1974, a 15-minute daily soap opera called Sounds Of The City, produced by African-American advertising agency Uniworld, with African-American Housewives as the target audience.

For sports, the MBN focused on coverage of black-college football games, including polls of the top teams in the United States.The MBN was the first radio broadcast network to cover a full schedule of games between major black colleges. Broadcasts of black college football games later had to be dropped due to costs.

Some of its special programming focused on African-American history, much of which was researched, written and narrated by MBN news anchor Ben Frazier. Other MBN news anchors included Glen Ford, John Askew, Robert Nichols, Joe White, Gerald Bentley, Larry Dean, Abby Kendrick and Ed Castleberry; Castleberry also hosted a celebrity interview program, Soul of Entertainment.

== Recognition ==
The Mutual Black Network received a Distinguished Service Award from the National Tenants Organization in 1974. The award was given in recognition of coverage of housing-related issues that low to medium income tenants faced around the country. The award was accepted by Mutual Black Network Capitol Hill correspondent Glen Ford at the 1974 National Tenants Organization Conference in Atlanta.

In 1977, Network vice-president Tom McKinney and chief editor Gregory Kearse were presented with the U.S. Labor Department's Public Service Award by Secretary of labor W.J. Usery, Jr. for the MBN's efforts in sharing information about Labor Department programs with listeners.

== History ==
In 1971, Mutual Broadcasting made numerous complaints to the FCC. They alleged ABC was attempting to create a monopoly of radio networks following their application to create a multi-network system. ABC's application was accepted, and Mutual filed a similar application soon after, leading to the creation of the Mutual Reports Network (MRN) before the branding change to Mutual Black Network (MBN). With 98 affiliated stations across the United States, including flagship WNJR in New York, led by journalist Sheldon Lewis, and an office in Washington D.C. led by Ed Castleberry.

The MBN joined forces with its parent network, the Mutual Broadcasting System to cover the 1972 United States presidential election. Broadcasting to over 620 affiliates across the United States.

The MBN hosted a dinner event honoring top black-college football players at the Americana Hotel in 1976, where players like Doug Williams from Grambling and Robert Sims from South Carolina State received scholarships.

In 1976, The Sheridan Broadcasting Network, an African American-owned company, became a 49% minority stockholder in the MBN and took over management of the network. Sheridan purchased the remainder of shares in 1979 and renamed the Sheridan Broadcasting Network. In 1991, SBN merged with the rival National Black Network, forming the present-day American Urban Radio Networks.

== Distribution ==
Initially, the Mutual Black Network subleased telephone lines from the Mutual Broadcasting Service in order to distribute programming across their 98 affiliates. They later switched to satellite transmission for distribution.

== Staff ==
- Glen Ford (Anchor)
- Ed Castleberry (Anchor)
- Sheldon Lewis (Anchor)
- John Askew (Anchor)
- Robert Nichols (Anchor)
- Joe White (Anchor)
- Gerald Bentley (Anchor)
- Larry Dean (Anchor)
- Abby Kendrick (Anchor)
- Tom McKinney (Vice-President)
- Gregory Kearse (Chief Editor)

== Affiliates ==
- WNJR, Newark, New Jersey, in the New York City market --flagship station
- WDAS-FM and WDAS in Philadelphia, Pennsylvania
- KCOH in Houston; Texas
- KJET in Beaumont, Port Arthur, Texas
- KOKY in Little Rock, Arkansas
- KPRS AM‐FM in Kansas City
- KYAC AM‐FM in Kirkland and Seattle, Washington
- KWK in St. Louis, Missouri
- WABQ in Cleveland, Ohio
- WERD in Jacksonville, Florida
- WIGO in Atlanta, Georgia
- WRBD, Broward County, Florida and its sister FM station WCKO
- WVKO in Columbus, Ohio
- WWIL-FM in Wilmington, North Carolina

== See also ==
- National Black Network
- Mutual Broadcasting System
