= Pinckney (given name) =

Pinckney is a masculine given name. It may include:

- Pinckney Benedict (born 1964), American short story writer
- Pinckney Downie Bowles (1835–1910), American Confederate general
- Pinckney Warren Russell (1864–1941), American classics scholar, pastor, educator
- Pinckney R. Tully (1824–1903), American businessman and politician
- Pinckney Wilkinson (c. 1693–1784), British merchant and politician

== See also ==
- Green Pinckney Russell (1861–1939), American school administrator and teacher
