= Hampton Plantation =

Historic house in South Carolina, United States

- U.S. National Register of Historic Places
- U.S. National Historic Landmark
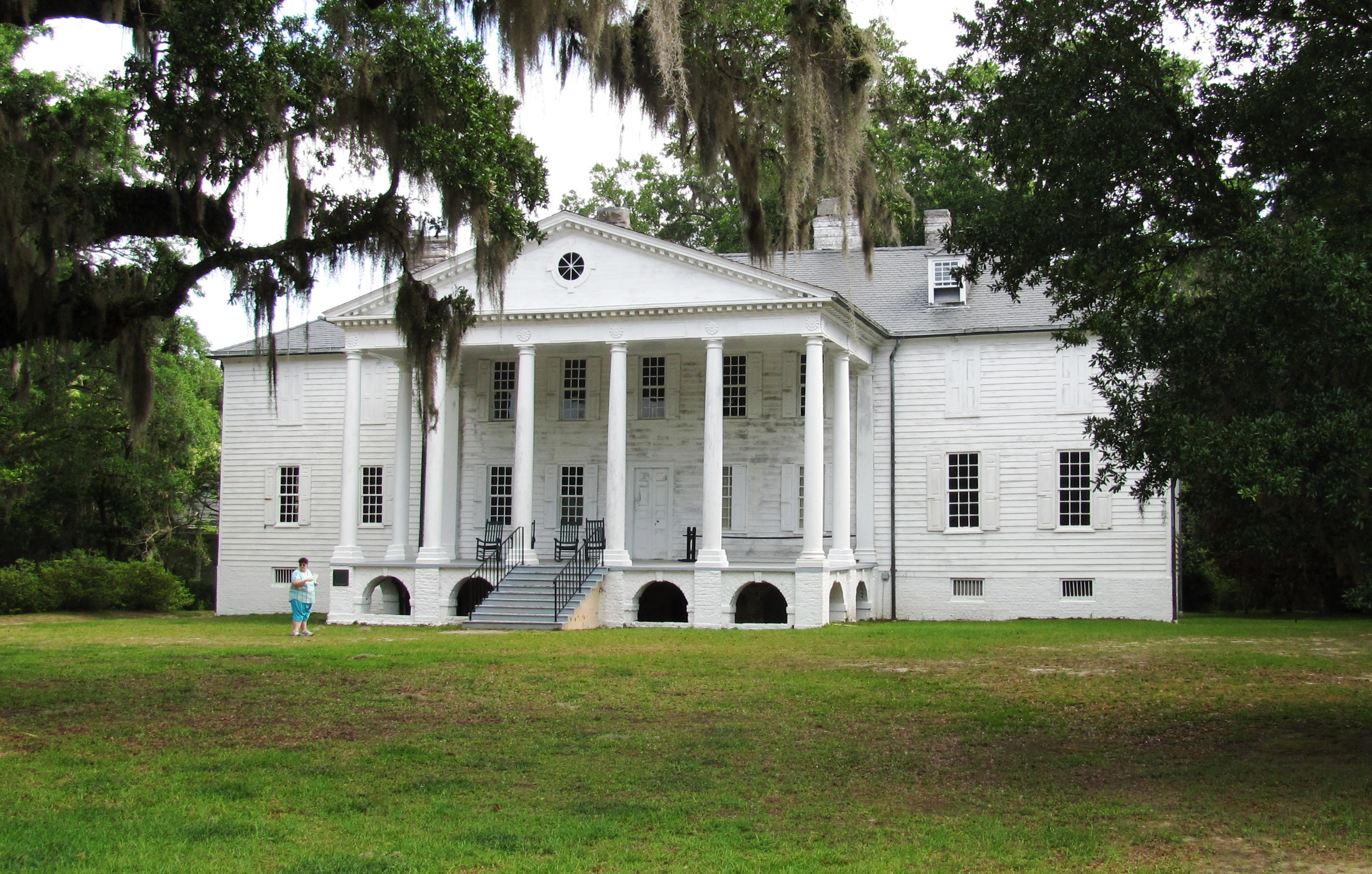
- Hampton Plantation House in 2010
- Nearest city: McClellanville, South Carolina
- Coordinates: 33°11′54″N 79°26′16″W
- Built: 1730
- Architectural style: Georgian
- NRHP reference No.: 70000582

Significant dates
- Added to NRHP: April 15, 1970
- Designated NHL: April 15, 1970

Hampton Plantation, also known as Hampton Plantation House and Hampton Plantation State Historic Site, is a historic plantation, now a state historic site, north of McClellanville, South Carolina. The plantation was established in 1735, and its main house exhibits one of the earliest known examples in the United States of a temple front in domestic architecture. It is also one of the state's finest examples of a wood frame Georgian plantation house. It was declared a National Historic Landmark in 1970. Hampton Plantation was a very prosperous rice growing plantation that kept hundreds of enslaved black human beings, forced to grow the rice against their will.

== Description and history ==
Hampton Plantation today consists of just under 300 acres (120 ha) of land on the banks of Hampton Creek, a tributary of the Santee River in northern Charleston County, South Carolina, west of United States Route 17. Most of the plantation land is no longer in agricultural use, and has reverted to natural wooded and swampy conditions. The main house, set near Hampton Creek, is a large 2 1/2-story wood-frame structure, with a dormered hip roof, clapboard siding, and a raised brick foundation. Its most prominent exterior feature is a projecting temple front, with eight Doric columns (six across and two additional on the sides) supporting a decoratively carved Adamesque frieze and pedimented gable. This feature, added in 1790–91, is believed to be the first of its type in the United States.

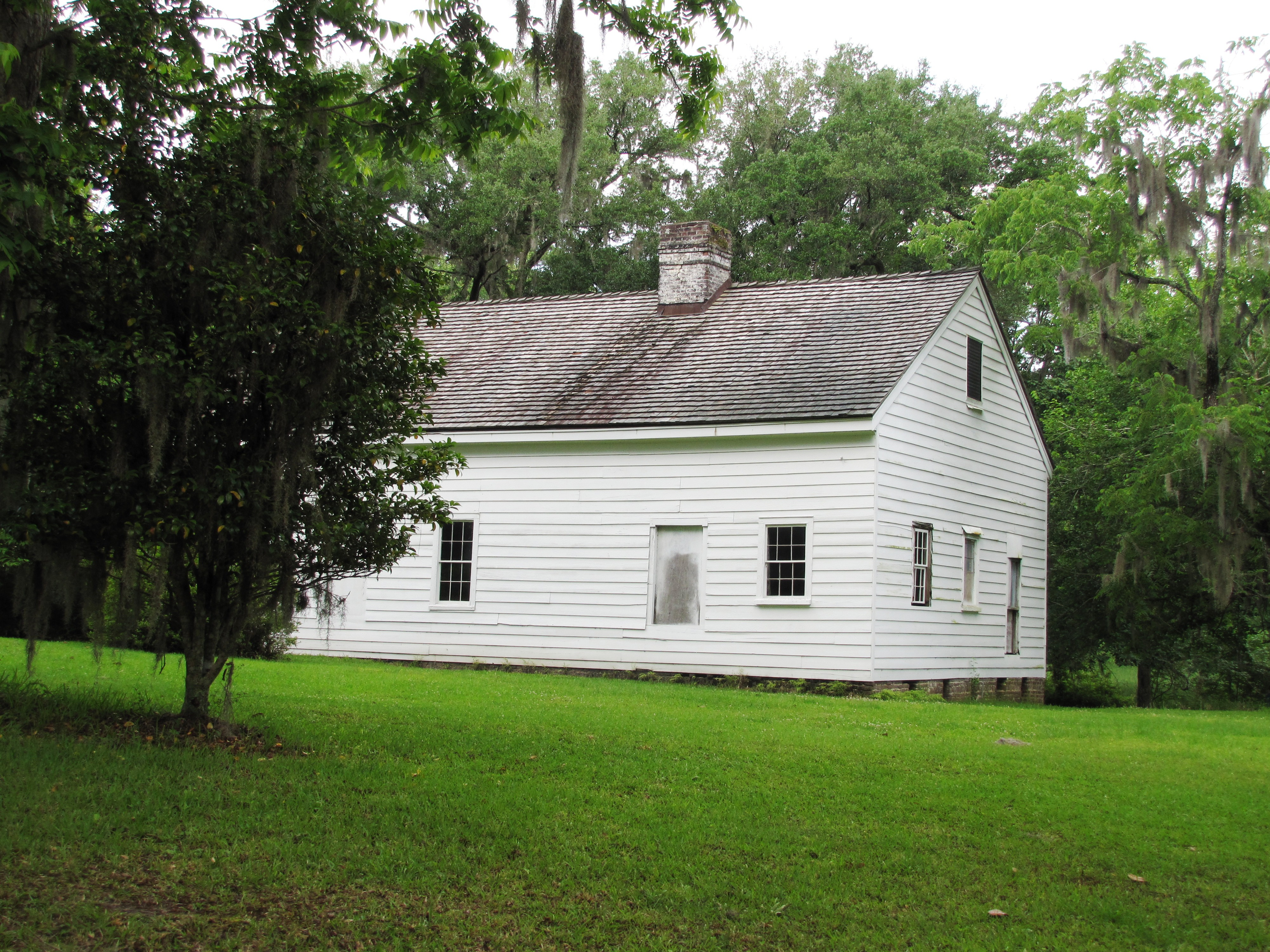
Hampton Plantation's Kitchen

This addition was completed in time for a visit by George Washington to the plantation.

The house has an evolutionary construction history, begun in 1735 and ending roughly in 1790–91. The original core of the house was built in 1735 by Noe Serre, a French Huguenot refugee, and was a central-hall two-story structure. The property was acquired in 1757 by Daniel Horry, who greatly expanded the building, adding a two-story ballroom on one side, and a master bedroom suite on the other. In order to ensure symmetry of appearance, Horry had false shuttered windows placed on the front walls of these additions. The front portico is the last major alteration made to the building. The Horrys, along with later owners from the Pinckney and Rutledge families, were all from politically and economically prominent South Carolina families. The last private owner of the property was Archibald Rutledge, the state's first poet laureate. Rutledge's 1941 book, titled Home by the River, describes his 1937 return to Hampton Plantation after a thirty-three year absence. Included is the tale of his efforts to restore the plantation and its 209-year-old house, all of which had been in his family since 1686. Pat Conroy, in his book, My Reading Life, recalls meeting Rutledge at Hampton Plantation when Conroy was an aspiring writer still in his teens, and Rutledge discussing writing, and the history of the Plantation, with him. The state purchased the property from the Rutledge family in 1971.

== See also ==
- List of National Historic Landmarks in South Carolina
- National Register of Historic Places listings in Charleston County, South Carolina
