= Candace Award =

Leadership award presented 1982–1992

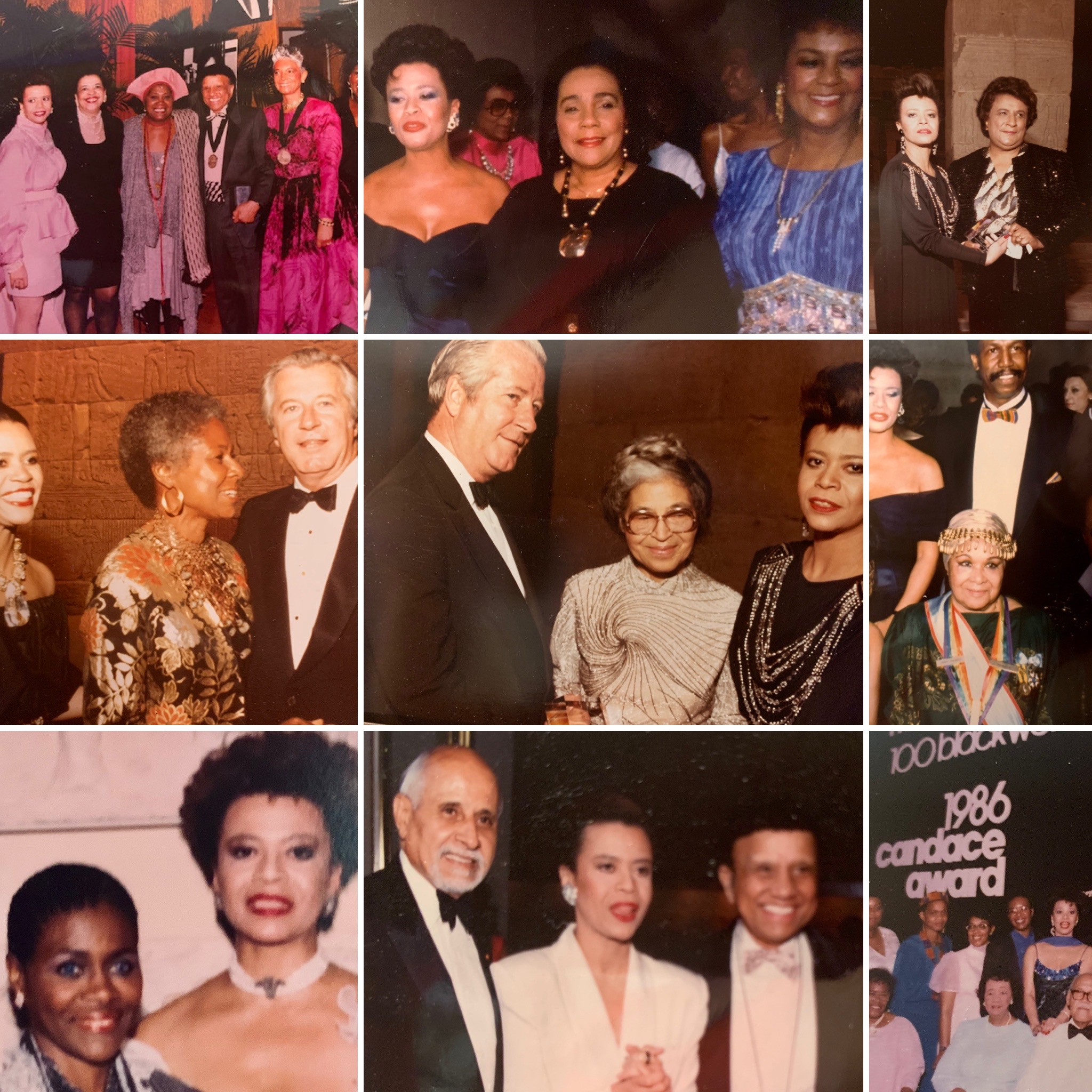
1986 Candace Award

The Candace Award is an award that was given from 1982 to 1992 by the National Coalition of 100 Black Women (NCBW) to "Black role models of uncommon distinction who have set a standard of excellence for young people of all races". Candace (pronounced can-DAY-see) was the ancient Ethiopian title for queen or empress. "Candace, queen of the Ethiopians" is mentioned in the Bible: Philip meets "a eunuch of great authority" under her reign and converts him to Christianity (Acts 8:27-39). The awards ceremony was held each year at the Metropolitan Museum of Art in New York City.

The award was established in 1982 as part of an effort to increase recognition of the achievements of Black intellectuals. The award was given annually to several women and one man in select categories including arts and letters, business, community service, economic development, education, health, science, history, and technology. Sponsorship was provided by The Paddington Corporation (through their brand Baileys Irish Cream) and then by AT&T. Tiffany & Co. customized engraved crystal for the awards ceremony. The President of the NCBW, Jewell Jackson McCabe, founded the award.

== Recipients 1982–1992 ==
The following people received the Candace Award between 1982 and 1992.

Year	Recipient	Category	Note
1989	Margaret Walker Alexander	Letters	
1990	Maya Angelou	Letters	
1983	Gloria Jackson Bacon	Health	Founder and director of a not-for-profit clinic in Chicago
1984	Ella Baker	Civil Rights Activist	
1983	Etta Moten Barnett	Letters	
1992	Kathleen Battle		
1984	Daisy Bates	Civil Rights Activist	
1990	Derrick Bell	Distinguished Service	
1984	Mary Bell	Communications	First black woman to head a broadcasting company
1982	Lerone Bennett, Jr.	History	
1983	Antoinette Bianchi	Technology	Founder of electronics firms in Maryland and Florida
1983	Selma Burke	Art	
1986	Mary Schmidt Campbell	Art	
1986	Alexa Canady	Science	
1991	Elizabeth Catlett		
1984	Leah Lange Chase	Business	New Orleans chef and restaurateur
1983	Mamie Phipps Clark	Humanitarianism	
1982	Jewel Plummer Cobb	Education	
1988	Johnnetta B. Cole	Education	
1987	Johnnie Colemon	Theology	
1989	Janet Collins	Arts	
1983	Mattie Cook	Community Service	President of Malcolm-King Harlem College Extension in Harlem
1992	Camille Cosby		
1989	Patricia Cowings	Science/Technology	
1989	Carolyn Craven	Journalism	Reporter on KQED-TV
1987	Christine Mann Darden	Technology	
1992	Julie Dash		
1986	Eloise DeLaine	Technology	Specialist in aviation medicine
1983	Suzanne de Passe	Business	
1989	Suzanne de Passe	Trailblazer	
1986	Helen O. Dickens	Health	
1991	Sharon Pratt Dixon		
1988	Beulah Mae Donald	Civil Rights	Mother of Michael Donald; successfully sued the Ku Klux Klan
1990	Hazel N. Dukes	Community Service	
1984	Patricia A. Duncanson	Economic Development	President of an electrical contracting company
1987	Katherine Dunham	Trailblazer	
1982	Marian Wright Edelman	Community Service	
1982	Helen G. Edmonds	History	First black woman to second the nomination for a US presidential candidate
1991	Joycelyn Elders		
1982	Doris A. Evans	Health and Science	Pediatrician; "community innovator and philanthropist"
1988	Michael A. Figures	Civil Rights	Alabama state senator; prosecuted KKK members in lynching
1991	Ann M. Fudge		
1992	Vicki L. Fuller		Wall Street executive
1983	Mary Hatwood Futrell	Education	Educator, president of the NEA
1988	Althea Gibson	Trailblazer	
1984	Paula Giddings	History	
1987	Cheryl Glass	Trailblazer	First black female American racing driver
1982	Bonnie Guiton	Business	First black woman to serve in the cabinet of a California governor
1989	Beverly Guy-Sheftall	Education	
1990	Clara M. Hale	Humanitarian	
1991	Ruth Wright Hayre		President of the Philadelphia Board of Education
1986	Dorothy I. Height	Distinguished Service	
1986	Freddye S. Henderson	Business	Pioneered the promotion of travel and tourism to Africa
1988	Vy Higginsen	Business	Founder of the Mama Foundation for the Arts
1988	Charlayne Hunter-Gault	Journalism	
1992	Hal Jackson		
1982	Shirley Ann Jackson	Technology	
1990	Judith Jamison		Dancer and choreographer, Artistic Director of Alvin Ailey American Dance Theater
1989	John H. Johnson	Distinguished Service	
1987	Pam McAllister Johnson	Communications	President and publisher of the Ithaca Journal
1984	Hazel Johnson-Brown	Health	
1992	Leonade Jones		Treasurer for the Washington Post Co.
1987	Coretta Scott King	Distinguished Service	
1983	Jewel Lafontant	Distinguished Service	
1990	Barbara Lamont	Business	First black woman to own a television station
1992	Queen Latifah		
1990	Sara Lawrence-Lightfoot	Education	
1983	LaSalle D. Leffall Jr.	Science	
1983	Ruth Love	Education	
1982	Lois Mailou Jones	Arts and Letters	
1986	Maida Springer Kemp	Labor	
1991	Brian Lanker		
1991	Jennifer Lawson		PBS executive vice president
1982	Claudine B. Malone	Economic Development	CEO of consulting firm; named Ebony No. 1 Black Director in 1997
1988	Winnie Mandela	Distinguished Service	
1992	Joan McCarley		Co-founder of Grandma's House, the first residential facility for HIV-infected children in the U.S.
1991	La-Doris McClaney		Los Angeles real-estate executive and philanthropist
1990	Gay J. McDougall	International Affairs	
1989	Gina Barclay McLaughlin	Community Service	Child development specialist
1986	Mable Parker McLean	Education	First female president of Barber-Scotia College
1992	Michel McQueen		
1982	Sybil C. Mobley	Economic Development	
1984	Undine S. Moore	Education	
1992	Sybil Hayden Morial		Community activist and dean of Xavier University's Drexel Center
1984	Constance Baker Motley	Distinguished Service	
1982	Diane Powell Murray	Technology	Mathematician
1986	Gloria Naylor	Letters	
1986	Nell Irvin Painter	History	
1990	Euzhan Palcy	Trailblazer	
1984	Rosa L. Parks	Civil Rights Activist	
1984	Jennie R. Patrick	Science and Technology	
1986	Frederick D. Patterson	Trailblazer	
1988	Ethel L. Payne	Trailblazer	
1982	Flaxie Madison Pinkett	Business	Civic leader, philanthropist
1990	Vivian Pinn	Science	
1991	Bernice Johnson Reagon		
1989	Condoleezza Rice	International Affairs	
1984	Faith Ringgold	Arts and Letters	
1982	Rachel Robinson	Distinguished Service	
1986	Rose Mary Sanders, Esq.	Law	First black female judge in Alabama
1992	Hazle J. Shorter		First black woman physician in the corporate history of DuPont
1992	Jessie Carney Smith		Black history scholar and author
1982	Jeanne Sinkford	Health and Science	
1992	Percy Sutton		
1992	Debbie Tate		Co-founder of Grandma's House, the first residential facility for HIV-infected children in the U.S.
1986	Susan L. Taylor	Communications	
1986	Debi Thomas	Trailblazer	
1983	Rosina Tucker	Labor	
1986	Nomalizo Leah Tutu	Humanitarianism	Wife of Desmond Tutu; advocate for rights of women and workers
1988	Cicely Tyson	Distinguished Service	
1982	Alice Walker	Arts and Letters	
1983	Patricia Walker-Shaw	Economic Development	
1988	Mary Helen Washington	History	Black history scholar
1992	Maxine Waters		
1989	Mary Lee Widener	Economic Development	CEO and President of Neighborhood Housing Services of America
1984	Eddie N. Williams	Public Service	Public affairs specialist
1983	Sylvia Williams	History	
1987	Barbara J. Wilson	Business	First black woman auto dealer
1988	Donna Wood	Arts and Letters	Lead dancer in Alvin Ailey Company
1982	Sara-Alyce Wright	Community Service	First black executive director of the YWCA
