= Patricia Walker-Shaw =

- Born: Lily Patricia Walker; July 26, 1939
- Died: June 30, 1985 (aged 45)
- Known for: Universal Life Insurance Company (president)
- Spouse: Harold Shaw
- Children: Harold Shaw, Jr.
- Parents: A. Maceo Walker (father); Harriette Walker (mother)
- Relatives: Joseph Edison Walker (grandfather)
- Awards: Candace Award (1983)

Patricia Walker-Shaw (July 26, 1939 – June 30, 1985) was elected president of the Universal Life Insurance Company of Memphis, Tennessee, United States in 1983, making her the first woman and first African-American woman to head a major life insurance organization in the United States.

== Biography ==
Patricia Walker-Shaw was born Lily Patricia Walker as the eldest of three children born to A. Maceo and Harriette (Ish) Walker.

She is the granddaughter of Joseph Edison Walker, who founded the Universal Life Insurance Company in Memphis, Tennessee in 1923. In 1983, she became president of the company upon the retirement of her father A. Maceo Walker. She would serve as president until her death in 1985.

She married Harold Shaw. This union produced a child, Harold Shaw, Jr., who worked for the Universal Life Insurance Company and Tri-State Bank until his death in 2019, this made him the fourth generation of the family to do so.

She received a Candace Award from the National Coalition of 100 Black Women in 1983. Also in 1983, Walker-Shaw became the first woman and first African-American woman president of the National Insurance Association
