= Patricia S. Cowings =

American psychologist

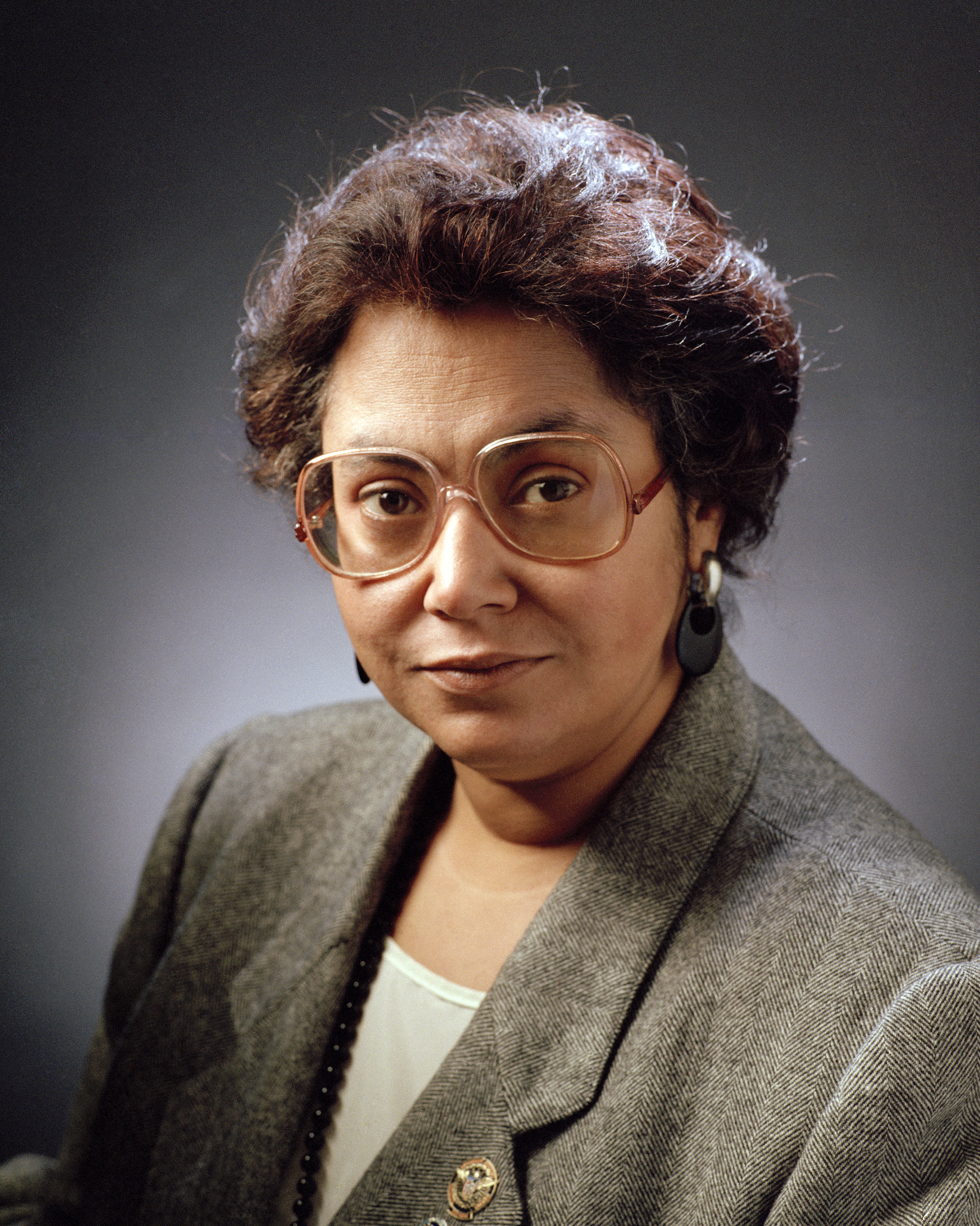
- NASA photograph of Dr. Patricia S. Cowings
- Born: Patricia S. Cowings; December 15, 1948; The Bronx, New York City, New York, U.S.
- Education: State University of New York at Stony Brook (BA Psychology); University of California Davis (MA Psychology; Ph.D. Psychology)
- Occupation: Psychophysiology
- Spouse: Dr. William B. Toscano (m. 1980)
- Parents: Albert S. Cowings; Sadie B. Cowings
- Awards: Candace Award; NASA Individual Achievement Award; Black Engineer of the Year Award; AMES Honor Award for Technology Development; NASA Space Act Award for Invention; National Women of Color Technology Award; NASA Space Act Board Award; Ames African American Advisory Group's (AAAG) Achievement Award; Celestial Torch Award from the National Society of Black Engineers (NSBE) in Los Angeles

Patricia S. Cowings (born December 15, 1948) is an aerospace psychophysiologist. She was the first American woman to be trained as a scientist astronaut by NASA; though she was an alternate for a space flight in 1979, she did not travel to space. She is most known for her studies in the physiology of astronauts in outer space, namely, helping find cures for astronaut's motion sickness. She is credited in creating and patenting the autogenic-feedback training exercise (AFTE) used to treat astronauts.

== Early life and family ==
Cowings was born and raised in The Bronx, New York City on December 15, 1948. She is the only daughter of Sadie B. and Albert S. Cowings. Sadie was an assistant preschool teacher and Albert was a grocery store owner. She had three other brothers who went on to become a two-star army general, a jazz musician, and a freelance journalist. Her parents emphasized education as a "way of getting out of the Bronx."

Cowings is most well known for developing methods to combat space sickness for astronauts in space. She began working at NASA in 1971, when she was a graduate student and received a fellowship in the Graduate Research Science Program. In 1973, she graduated from the University of California, Davis, with a psychology degree.

Although Cowings never made it to space, she became the first African American woman scientist to be trained as an astronaut by NASA in 1979. Even though she never went to space, she still spent 34 years researching the effects of gravity on human physiology^1. Cowings invention of a program, called the autogenic-feedback training exercise, would be tested in astronauts for the first time on the STS-51B and STS-51C shuttle flights in 1985^3. Her program was successful and she also developed an instrument that could easily monitor astronauts’ physiological responses in space^3.

== Education ==
Patricia found her love for science at a young age. Patricia was involved in African dance and step and graduated with a bachelor's degree in the arts from the State University of New York at Stony Brook in 1970. Psychology and later psychophysiology showed her how to enhance human potential. 'What better field is there than to study the animal who created all the other fields? Humans!' This love was further helped by her psychologist aunt, whom she considered a deep inspiration because she had earned a PhD from the University of California at Davis in 1973. Taking an engineering class in grad school where she took part in designing a space shuttle helped launch her desire to work in the field of space technology.

== Career ==
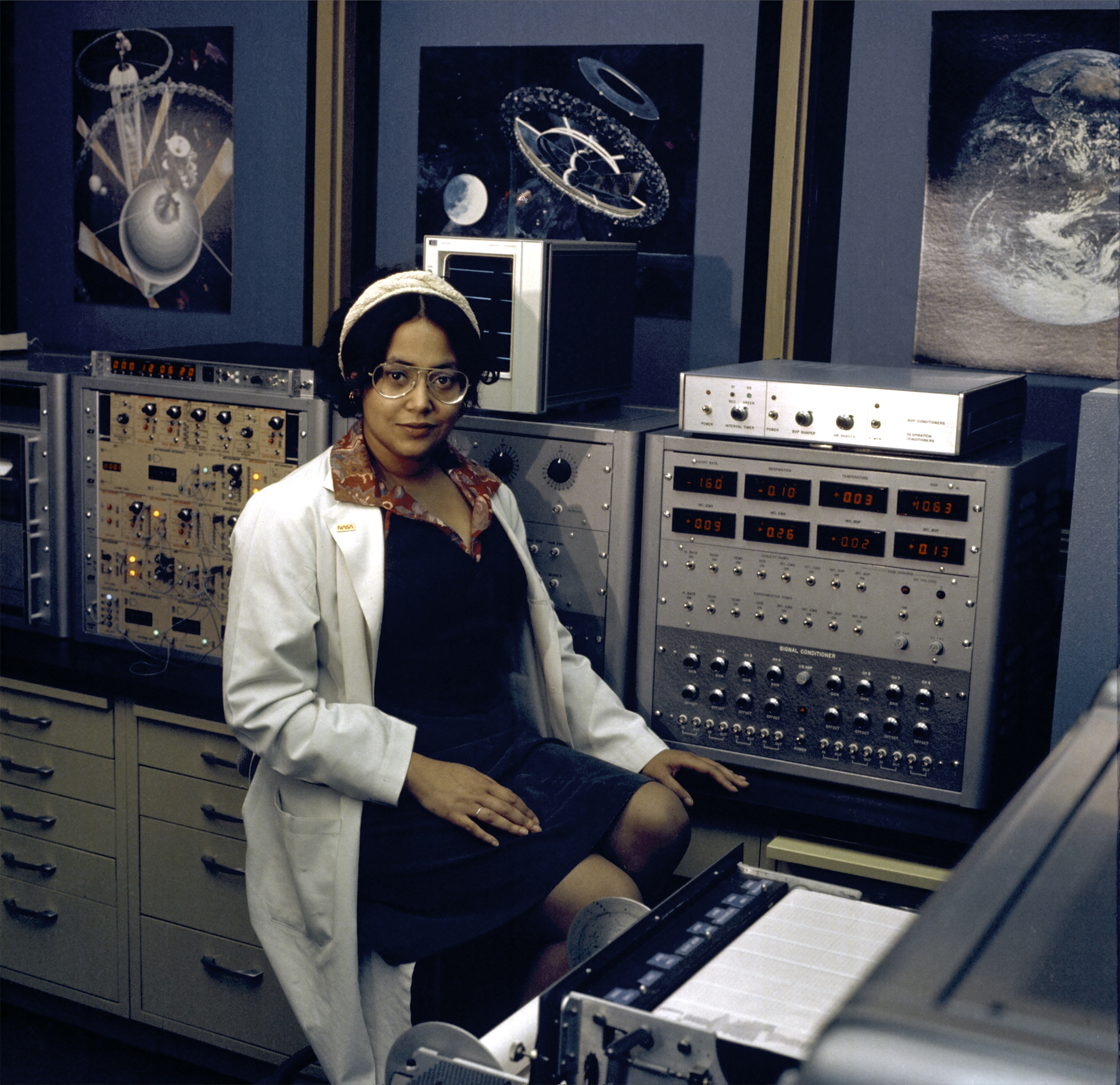
Dr. Patricia Cowings, a research psychologist in the Biomedical Division of Ames Research Center

She did most of her research at NASA Ames Research Center. There she developed and patented a physiological training system called Autogenic-Feedback Training Exercise (AFTE), which enables people to learn voluntary self-control of up to 24 bodily responses in six hours. Her work was first tested in 1985 for (STS 51-b & STS 51c) Spacelab-3 and the first DOD shuttle mission. She tested her AFTE training method also on the Space J-Lab Mission (the first Japanese shuttle mission), with her work focusing on ridding of the astronaut's motion sickness. Later she trained four cosmonauts to control both motion sickness and low blood pressure after six months in space aboard the MIR space station. She found success with her biofeedback methods and continued to teach people how to control motion sickness, improve the performance of search and rescue pilots, and reduce symptoms of several patient populations experiencing nausea, dizziness and fainting. She has helped author several publications with her husband, Dr. William B. Toscano. They have a son, Christopher Michael Cowings Toscano, who traveled with them as they trained space crews.

Today, she continues her work helping to prevent motion sickness for astronauts in space, as well as helping control motion sickness for their return home. She is the principal investigator of Psychophysiological Research Laboratories at NASA Ames Research Center and has held adjunct professorships in Psychiatry at UCLA and both medical and clinical psychology at the uniformed services university. (ARC).

== Innovation ==
Cowings’ most notable innovation was the development of the autogenic-feedback training exercise (AFTE) which was a treatment method for space motion sickness in astronauts. The AFTE would teach future astronauts to control up to 20 physiological responses in space to overcome their sickness and to allow them to carry out their work. Responses included heart rate, skin conductance, muscle reactivity, blood pressure, and others which would all be affected by space and the loss of gravity.

=== The Pain Point ===
Cowings wanted to solve the problems that astronauts faced when trying to adapt to the environment in space. She wanted to develop non-medical methods to help them adapt faster. In the early 1980s, Cowings recognized that many astronauts faced space sickness, and studied its psychological and biological impact. Initially in her project, she would induce the sickness in test subjects for observations and then created a program that would allow astronauts to combat the sickness in six hours total. What resulted was a program of 12 half-hour sessions which combined training and biofeedback, which allowed astronauts to control their reactions instead of being subject to them.

=== Impact ===
Cowings’ invention of the AFTE allowed astronauts to control their bodies and to prevent the sickness in space that would slow down their adaptation to space conditions. With the training of the AFTE, astronauts could better control their heart rate, rate of respiration, and the flow of blood to the hands. At the beginning of their training, participants would receive feedback on how to control their responses and then gradually would learn on their own. These repetitions would eventually allow astronauts to be more comfortable in space, transition to the conditions in space, and to more quickly carry out their mission.

== Legacy ==
Cowings’ AFTE is still being used today and its use has expanded into the medical field as well. Today, Cowings and her team prepare astronauts to handle the strenuous conditions of space with the AFTE. Additionally, Cowings has expanded the use of the AFTE by running a program to help hospital patients with various conditions, such as gastrointestinal disorders. In the Morehouse University School of Medicine in Atlanta, the AFTE is being used to help with patients’ blood pressure, nausea, and hypertension.

Cowings, even today, still works in trying to mitigate space sickness in astronauts. Over the course of her career, she has earned the NASA Individual Achievement Award, the Black Engineer of the Year Award, the AMES Honor Award for Technology Development, the NASA Space Act Award for Invention, and the National Women of Color Technology Award.

== Awards and honors ==
Her research and teaching has garnered her several awards, including:

- Candace Award, National Coalition of 100 Black Women (1989)
- NASA Individual Achievement Award (1993)
- Black Engineer of the Year Award (1997)
- AMES Honor Award for Technology Development (1999)
- NASA Space Act Award for Invention (2002)
- National Women of Color Technology Award (2006)
- NASA Space Act Board Award (2008)
- Ames African American Advisory Group's (AAAG) Achievement Award (2010)
- Celestial Torch Award from the National Society of Black Engineers (NSBE) in Los Angeles (2014)
