= Martha S. Lewis =

American government official (1924–2007)

- Born: February 24, 1924; Kensett, Arkansas, U.S.
- Died: July 2, 2007 (aged 83); Albany, New York, U.S.
- Education: University of Arkansas at Pine Bluff; Atlanta University (MSW); Harvard University
- Occupations: Government official, social worker

Martha S. Lewis (February 24, 1924, in Kensett, Arkansas – July 2, 2007, in Albany, New York) was an American government official and social worker. She had a long career as a ground-breaking social worker in the metropolitan New York City area and elsewhere. In the 1970s, she was the highest ranking African-American official in any state government, as a deputy commissioner for the Department of Social Services in the New York State government. She was also a pioneer in the civil rights movement.

== Education and early life ==
Lewis received a bachelor's degree in social sciences from the University of Arkansas at Pine Bluff in 1944. She next earned her Master of Social Work (MSW) degree from Atlanta University School of Social Work in 1947. She also briefly attended the Harvard University's School of Government.

== Civil rights activism and social work ==
Lewis began her social work career by working in the 1950s with youth in New Orleans, Los Angeles, and New York City. As an expert on juvenile delinquency and deviance, she wrote the seminal 1961 report The Girl Delinquent and the Male Street-Corner Gang.

In 1970, Lewis was one of two dozen original founders of the Coalition of One Hundred Black Women, a civil rights organization for Black women. She was an active member of the NAACP, the National Urban League, and other civil rights organizations.

== Government career ==
Lewis held several high-level positions in the New York city and state government from the 1960s to the 1980s, under both Republican and Democratic administrations.

Mayor John Lindsay appointed her in 1964 to be deputy director for the Department of Social and Community Services at New York City Housing Authority, a public housing authority in New York City. In 1968, Mayor Lindsay next appointed her to run the "Operation Better Block", which was a prototype for block associations. She worked as a consultant in the early 1970s. Finally, she served as the director of the Department of Social and Community Services for the New York City Housing Authority from 1972 to 1975, also under Lindsay.

In 1975, she was appointed a deputy commissioner for special projects for the state Department of Social Services by the newly elected governor Hugh L. Carey. In 1977, she became deputy commissioner for the New York City metropolitan area.

After retirement, she served on the board of the Cathedral Choral Society of the Washington National Cathedral. She also volunteered with the New York State Museum, The Girl Friends, Inc., and the Cathedral of All Saints in Albany.

== See also ==
- Jewell Jackson McCabe
