= Gay McDougall =

American lawyer (born 1947)

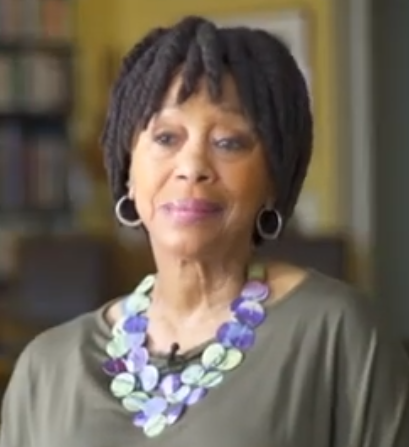
- In a UNOHCHR video in 2018
- Born: August 13, 1947 (age 78); Atlanta, Georgia, US
- Education: Bennington College; Yale Law School; London School of Economics and Politics
- Occupation: Lawyer

Gay Johnson McDougall (born August 13, 1947) is an American lawyer who has spent her career addressing international human rights and racial discrimination. She is currently a Distinguished Scholar-in-Residence at the Leitner Center on International Law and Justice of Fordham University Law School. She was executive director of Global Rights, Partners for Justice (from September 1994 to 2006). In August 2005, she was named the first United Nations Independent Expert on Minority Issues, serving until 2011.

== Early years ==
Gay Johnson McDougall was born in Atlanta on August 13, 1947, to Louis and Inez Gay Johnson. Her father was a hospital cook and her mother a high school math teacher. She grew up in the Dixie Hills neighborhood of Atlanta. She attended Atlanta public schools and in 1965 graduated from Booker T. Washington High School.

As a child, Gay McDougall was banned from many public places in Atlanta. When she finished high school, she was chosen to be the first black student to integrate Agnes Scott College in Decatur, Georgia. Looking back on the experiences of her early years, she has said: "We believed then that our situation was uniquely tragic ... We often looked to the international community with the hope that somehow the world beyond this country operated on different rules... We were both right and wrong."

== Education and private law career ==
After two years at Agnes Scott, she transferred to Bennington College in Bennington, Vermont. She earned her BA in social science from Bennington, her JD at Yale Law School, and her LLM in public international law at the London School of Economics and Politics.

After graduating from Yale Law School, she joined the New York City corporate law firm of Debevoise, Plimpton, Lyons & Gates.

== Non-profit career ==
McDougall was in 2018 a Distinguished Scholar-in-Residence at the Leitner Center on International Law and Justice, Fordham University Law School

In 1998, she was elected to serve as an independent expert on the United Nations treaty body that oversees the International Convention on the Elimination of All Forms of Racial Discrimination (CERD). She was the first American to be elected to the body of 18 international experts who oversee compliance by governments worldwide with the obligations established under the treaty. She served a four-year term, from 1998 to 2001. She was elected to another four-year term on the CERD Committee in June 2015, and served on the committee for a term that began on January 20, 2016, and ended on January 19, 2020. She was a vice-chairperson of the committee.

In 1999, the United Nations Commission on Human Rights elected her to serve a four-year term as a member (alternate) of the U.N. Sub-Commission on Prevention of Discrimination and Protection of Minorities of the Human Rights commission.

She also served as Special Rapporteur on the issue of systematic rape, sexual slavery, and slavery-like practices in armed conflict, in which capacity she presented a study to the United Nations Sub-Commission on Human Rights that called for international legal standards for prosecuting acts of systematic rape and sexual slavery committed during armed conflict. As Special Rapporteur she also toured Sierra Leone with the U.N. High Commissioner for Human Rights to assess the devastating impact the civil war had on civilian populations.

Prior to joining Global Rights, McDougall served as one of five international members of South Africa's 16-member Independent Electoral Commission which organized and administered that country's first non-racial elections. During southern Africa's apartheid era, she was director of the Southern African Project of the Lawyers' Committee for Civil Rights Under Law from 1980 until early 1994 and gave direct assistance to the defense of thousands of political prisoners in South Africa and Namibia by financing the defense and collaborating with attorneys.

In 1989, McDougall founded the Commission on Independence for Namibia, a bipartisan group of 31 distinguished Americans who monitored in detail the year-long process to independence mandated by the U.N. The Commission intervened to force modifications in critical legislation, such as the voter registration and election laws, which as drafted, threatened the fairness of the election process.

== Honors ==
McDougall was awarded a MacArthur Foundation Fellowship in 1999 for her "innovative and highly effective" work on behalf of international human rights.

She has Honorary Doctor of Law degrees from Georgetown University Law Center, the University of Witwatersrand (South Africa), the School of Law of the City University of New York, Agnes Scott College, the School of Advanced Study, University of London, and Boston University.

McDougall received a Candace Award from the National Coalition of 100 Black Women in 1990.

== Other positions ==
- United Nations Committee on the Elimination of Racial Discrimination, member
- Senior Scholars 2002, Institute for Policy Studies
- Board Member, Africare
- Board Member, CARE (Cooperative for Assistance and Relief Everywhere)
- Board Member, Global Fund for Women
- Advisory Council, Realizing Rights
- Executive Council, American Society of International Law
- Distinguished Scholar in Residence, American University's College of Law Faculty
- Visiting Scholar, American University Washington College of Law Academy on Human Rights and Humanitarian Law
- Mulligan Distinguished Visiting Professor of International Law, and Distinguished Scholar-in-Residence, Leitner Center for International Law and Justice, Fordham University School of Law
- Board member of the Open Society Justice Initiative of the Open Society Foundations
