= Diane Powell Murray =

- Education: Cornell University
- Occupations: Software engineer and program manager

Diane Powell Murray is an American software engineer and program manager. In 2006 she received Computerworld's Premier 100 Technology Leadership Award, and in 1982 the Candace Award from the National Coalition of 100 Black Women.

== Education ==
In 1974, Murray graduated Spelman College with a Bachelor of Arts degree in mathematics. She earned a Master of Science degree in operations research from Cornell University in 1976.

== Career ==
After graduating with her master's degree, Murray went to work for the Eastman Kodak Company from January 1976 to June 1977. In August 1977, she began to work for TRW Inc., where she remains. She does work related to systems and software engineering, as well as product management. She was part of TRW's Missile Application Program from 1977 to 1980. From 1981 to 1986, she worked on strategic and space defense projects, as well as on projects related to a subcontracted, synthetic seismogram generator. In 1982, she appeared in the film Science: Women's Work that was produced by the American Association for the Advancement of Science, the National Science Foundation, and TRW, Inc. She became a manager to over 60 people in 1986. In 1990, she provided technical support for the Earth Observing System Satellite and Information System. Since then, she has worked on a variety of projects, and has also worked on programs related to United States government intelligence. When TRW was bought by the Northrop Grumman Corporation, she continued her employment there. By 2005, she was the Vice President and Chief Information Officer for the Mission Systems Sector. In 2006 Northrop Grumman appointed her Sector Vice President for Mission Assurance. After 32 years of service at TRW/Northrop Grumman, Diane Murray retired in 2009.

== Public service ==
Murray has worked as a district coordinator for the Boy Scouts of America. She was also appointed by TRW to be a member of the Carson California Child Guidance Advisory Committee. She has also participated in the Los Angeles Upward Bound Program, where she taught mathematics. She has also served on TRW's Advisory Board of Women and on its Affirmative Action Committee. She also served as a member of the Diversity Advisory Board for Penn State University's School of Engineering.

== Awards ==
Murray received the Candace Award in 1982 from the National Coalition of 100 Black Women. She has also received an award from the Spelman College Alumnae Association for excellence in science and technology. TRW named her Outstanding Woman of the Year in 1996. In 2005, she was honored with the National Woman of Color Technology Award. In 2006, she received Computerworld's Premier 100 Technology Leadership award.
