= H.B. Jackson =

H.B. Jackson may refer to:

- Hal Jackson (Harold Baron Jackson, 1915–2012), American disc jockey
- Harold Baron Jackson Jr. (1939–2016), son of Hal Jackson, American lawyer and judge
- Sir Henry Bradwardine Jackson (1855–1929), Royal Navy officer
