= Sybil Collins Mobley =

American educator in Florida

Sybil C. Mobley
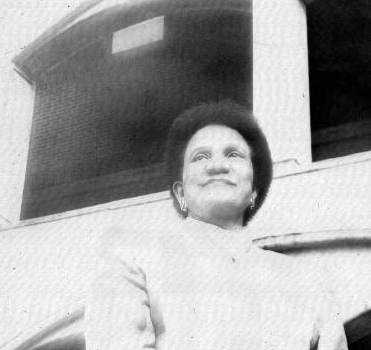
- Dr. Sybil Collins Mobley

Dean of the School of Business and Industry at Florida A&M University
- In office November 5, 1973 – June 30, 2003
- Preceded by: Position Established
- Succeeded by: Lydia McKinley-Floyd

Personal details
- Born: October 14, 1925 Shreveport, Louisiana, U.S.
- Died: September 29, 2015 (aged 89) Tallahassee, Florida, U.S.
- Spouse: James Otis Mobley
- Education: Bishop College; Wharton School (MBA); University of Illinois (PhD)

Sybil Lenora Collins Mobley (October 14, 1925 – September 29, 2015) was Dean Emerita of the Florida Agricultural and Mechanical University (FAMU) School of Business and Industry. She led its business program and was the founding dean of its Business School. She also oversaw community projects including a revitalization program for majority African American Gretna, Florida.

== Early life and education ==
Sybil Collins grew up in Shreveport, Louisiana, where her father, Melvin Collins was an educator and founder of the Shreveport Sun newspaper, and her mother was a teacher. She graduated from high school and then attended Bishop College in Texas, where she was an outstanding student.

Opportunities for employment were slim and she accepted a job as a secretary at FAMU in 1945. Years later, she was recognized for her business skills and encouraged to take the graduate school admissions exam and excelled. She was accepted into the Wharton School of Finance at the University of Pennsylvania, where she made the Dean's List. She was then entered the University of Illinois, where she completed her classwork towards her doctorate in one and a half years.

== Career ==
Mobley rose from the ranks of a professor to department chair (1971-1974) to founding dean of the School of Business and Industry (SBI) from 1974-2003. During her tenure as SBI's dean, Mobley implemented a Professional Leadership Development (PLD) Program designed to teach students behavioral competencies to complement their academic preparation. To support her PLD and academic curricula, Mobley started the SBI Big Board, which consists of over 100 plaques. Each plaque on the SBI Big Board represents a minimum donation of $100,000 endowed for scholarships. The earnings from the SBI Big Board accounts still enable SBI to provide scholarships to students today. As a result of her contributions to FAMU, Mobley received the designation of Dean Emerita upon her retirement.

== Legacy and honors ==
In addition to serving as a master administrator in higher education and being a Certified Public Accountant (CPA) in the State of Florida, Mobley served on the boards of directors of Anheuser-Busch Company, Champion International Corporation, Hershey Foods Corporation, Sears Roebuck & Company, Southwestern Bell Corporation, Dean Witter, and Discover. Mobley and her husband, James Mobley, an entrepreneur, were also pioneers in the Tallahassee Civil Rights Movement.

Some of Mobley's other affiliations included Alpha Kappa Alpha, the International Association of Black Business Educators, the National Association of Black Accountants, Florida Women's Hall of Fame, and the FAMU SBI Hall of Fame to name a few. Dr. Mobley served as a consultant to the United States Agency for International Development for multiple African countries, and she was awarded the FAMU Lifetime Achievement Award among numerous other awards. She received a Candace Award from the National Coalition of 100 Black Women in 1982 and was inducted as a member of The Accounting Hall of Fame.

Mobley positively changed the personal, economic, and professional trajectory of hundreds of thousands of individuals, including her students, faculty, and staff.

== Family ==
Mobley was married to James Mobley and they had three children.

== Death ==
Mobley died in the early morning hours of September 29, 2015, at Tallahassee Memorial Healthcare after a brief illness; she was 89.
