= Clara Hale =

American humanitarian

Clara McBride Hale
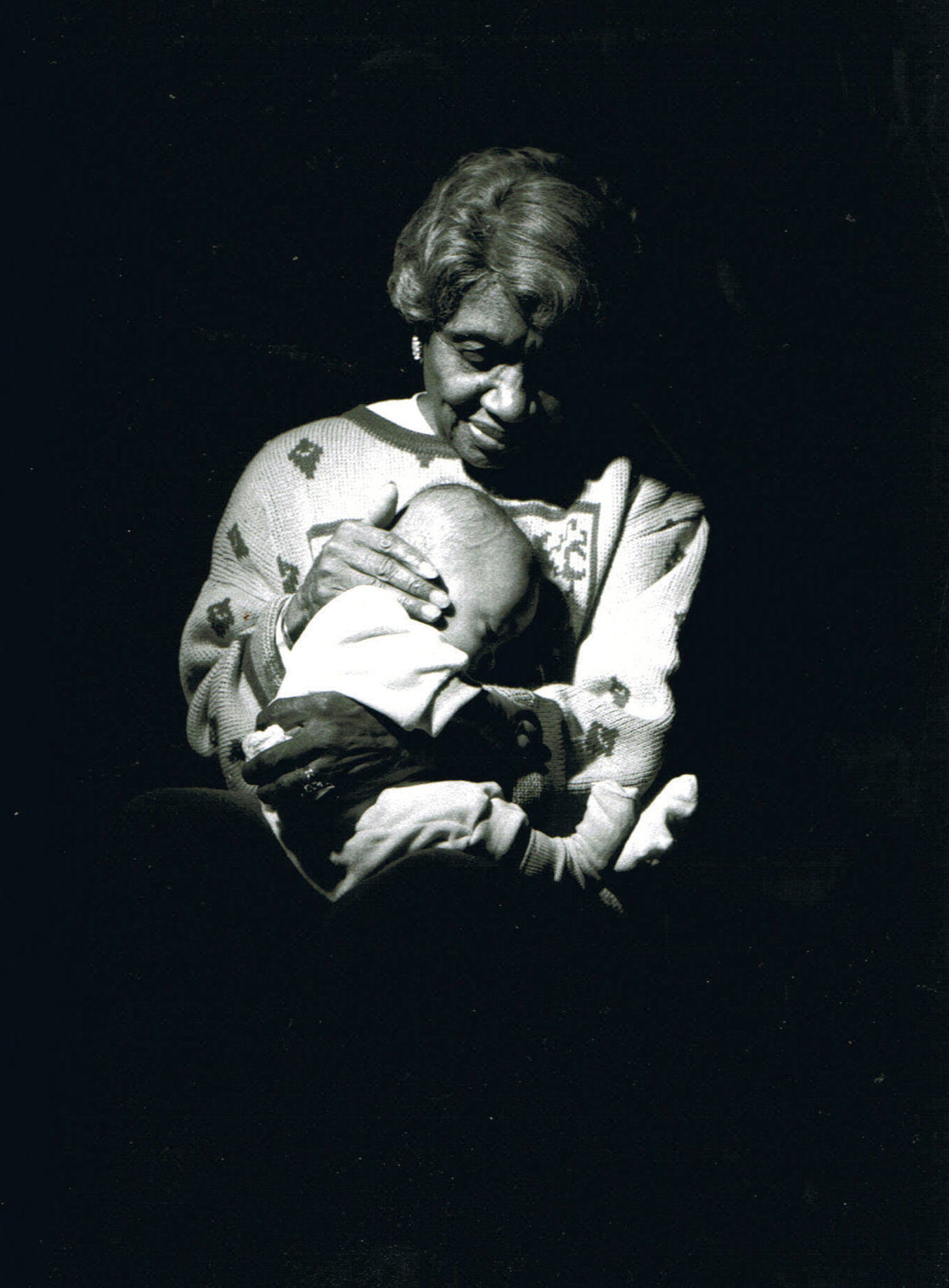
- Born: Clara McBride; April 1, 1905; Elizabeth City, North Carolina, US
- Died: December 18, 1992 (aged 87); New York City, US
- Occupation: Humanitarian
- Children: 3

Clara McBride Hale (April 1, 1905 – December 18, 1992), also known as Mother Hale, was an American humanitarian who founded the Hale House Center], a home for disadvantaged children and children who were born addicted to drugs in the Harlem section of New York City.

== Early life ==
Clara McBride was born April 1, 1905, in Elizabeth City, North Carolia, and raised in Philadelphia, Pennsylvania.

Hale's father died when she was a baby. This left her mother alone to raise Hale and her four siblings. Her mother placed a very high importance on parenting and being available to her children during their development. She supported her children through cooking for others and also allowing boarders to stay in their home. It seems that Hale gained this same love and appreciation for parenting. Hale claimed that everything she was able to accomplish was due to her mother and the parenting that she witnessed as a child.

Clara married shortly after high school and moved to New York City where she studied business administration, cleaned, and worked as a domestic. She was 27 when her husband died. She had three children, Nathan, Lorraine and adopted son Kenneth. In 1938, her husband died from cancer, and Hale struggled to support her children through the Great Depression. Her rough life made it hard to financially support and care for her three children, consequently she had to find a job. Hale cleaned houses and continued her job as a janitor, laboring day and night to make ends meet.

Eventually she retired from these jobs to spend more time with her children. She stayed home with her children and in order to be as big a part of their lives as possible, Hale opened her own home daycare, initially keeping the children while their parents worked during the day. The children that she cared for found her home to be such a caring and loving environment they did not want to go home at the end of the day, most began to stay full-time only seeing their mothers on the weekends. She used her home as a day care for other struggling parents which later led her to become a foster parent. In the 1940s, she provided short-term and long-term care for community children in her home. She also found permanent homes for homeless children and taught parents essential parenting skills. Hale became a foster mother and got a license and took in 7-8 children at a time. By 1968, she had taken care of over 40 foster children.

== Programs ==
Later her work with children extended beyond just the care. Many programs were created for children and families to help them more. Some examples are Community-Based Family; which is a program for troubled youngsters; Time-Out-Moms, a program that helps the parents out by having a place for their kids when their parents needed to relax or breathe. They also had Children Helping Children, which was a program for juveniles. In addition, the Hale House launched research programs about problems of drug- or alcohol-addicted mothers and their infants to help educate the problems they can face. Families also went to this home that were infected with HIV or AIDS, and also the Hale house established programs for housing, educating, and supporting mothers after detoxification.

== Death ==
Shortly before her death in New York City, she kept at least one infant in her own room. She died of complications of a stroke on December 18, 1992, at the age of 87. According to Rev. Dr. James A. Forbes, Jr., Senior Minister at Riverside Church where she and her family were members, "She left instructions that there be no sad funerals." Her funeral took place on December 23 with over 2,000 people in attendance, including Mayor David Dinkins, U.S. Senator Alfonse D'Amato, former Manhattan Borough President Percy Sutton, U.S. Representative Charles Rangel, Adam Clayton Powell IV, Manhattan Borough President Ruth Messinger, the Reverend Al Sharpton, Dr. Calvin O. Butts, Yoko Ono and her son, Sean Lennon. This roster shows the scope of respect this extraordinary woman had gained in the world for her work to positively influence so many children, their families and the entire Harlem community.

After her death in 1992, Hale's work was continued by her daughter, Dr. Lorraine Hale. The climate at Hale House clearly changed with Mother Hale's death. In 2001, the Hale House was under investigation for skirting the law and misuse of money solicited from the public. An interim board found what it called credible evidence that Hale House engaged in transactions involving self-dealing and other conflicts of interest, resulting in the waste of corporate assets and the violation of its legal and contractual obligations. Dr. Lorraine Hale was subsequently forced out amid reports of financial mismanagement. She and her husband were arrested, charged with using more than $1 million in donations to make home improvements, lend money to relatives and prop up an off-Broadway flop. Although never convicted, she was removed by the new Hale House board. Unfortunately, the House and it's extended programs have since then been defunct.

== Legacy ==
Hale was living in Harlem, New York, where she retired from working as a domestic and started her work by beginning to help addicted children in 1969. Although Hale had originally opened her house as a way of making a living, it eventually led her to find her life calling. She took babies addicted to Heroin into her home, and within months, she was caring for 22 infants. Mother Hale became known for the work she did and became known as a mother to those who did not have one. At the age of 65 is when Hale began to take children in who were born addicted to their mother's drug habits during pregnancy.

This started in 1969 when Clara Hale's daughter, Lorraine, brought a mother and child who were addicted to drugs to Hale's home. She later got a home license as a "child care facility" in 1970, called the Hale House. A few years later Hale purchased a larger building, a 5 story home so there could be more space and more room to fit more, and in 1975 she was able to attain a license in child-care. It was officially known as Hale House. After that time, Hale devoted her life to caring for needy children. She took in children, free of charge, who were addicted to drugs and helped them through their addictive periods. She would raise the children as if they were her own and once they were healthy she would help to find families interested in adoption. She took it upon herself to make sure the families were a correct fit and even in some cases turned families down if she thought they could not provide a good enough home for the child. She eventually helped over 1,000 drug addicted babies and young children who were born addicted to drugs, children born with HIV, and children whose parents had died of AIDS. It was simple, she said; "hold them, rock them, love them and tell them how great they are."

Harlem was recognized for the number of citizens living at poverty level, high unemployment rates, and unsanitary living conditions. It was stated in the New York Herald at the time, that it was "…the poorest, the unhealthiest, the unhappiest and the most crowded single large section of New York". Growing up in Harlem, the mid 1900s didn't allow for a promising future. During this time period it was exceptionally hard to receive a good education. In 1962, 96 percent of Harlem's students were African American. Due to the racial issues at the time there were very few teachers who were willing to teach and provide the students with sufficient education. According to test scores, by the end junior high level the majority of students were more than two and a half years behind the average New York City student. Hale recognized the importance that an education provided and also the need for an opportunity to receive one.

Hale also put a great deal of value into her religious upbringing. She was raised as a part of a Baptist church. It can also be suggested that her faith in God and strong moral upbringing had a lot to do with the behavior that she displayed throughout her life. It was stated by Hale herself that through her childhood she faced many hard times but it was due to her Christian upbringing that she was able to succeed. One major accomplishment in Hale's life was being the first in her family to graduate from high school. This was not seen to be a regular occurrence during her time period but due to the morals and ethics that Hale had learned throughout her time in the church this was something she expected of herself. This advanced education may have also had part to do with the lifestyle that she would come to choose. It gave her an appreciation for ethnic and social class differences.

== Awards ==
In 1985, then-President Ronald Reagan honored Clara Hale as an American hero in his State of the Union Address. In 1986, the Women's International Center gave Hale the Living Legacy Award which "honor(s) women for their great contributions to humanity".

- Honorary member of Delta Sigma Theta sorority
- Member of the American Commission on Drug Free Schools
- NAACP Image Award in the 1980s.
- Candace Award for Humanitarianism, National Coalition of 100 Black Women, 1990.
