= Flaxie Madison Pinkett =

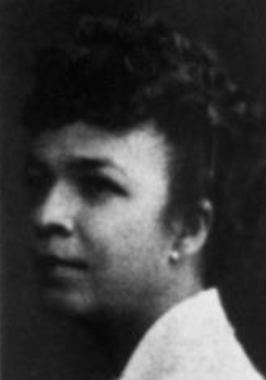
- Flaxie M. Pinkett, from a 1964 publication of the US State Department
- Born: Saint Louis, Missouri
- Died: 1995
- Occupations: Realtor, corporate executive, college founder

Flaxie Madison Pinkett (died May 1995) was an African American philanthropist and businesswoman based in the United States. She received a Candace Award in 1982 from the National Coalition of 100 Black Women.

== Life ==
Pinkett was born in St. Louis, to John Pinkett Jr. and Flaxie Holcombe Pinkett, but grew up in Atlanta and Washington, D.C., with her five siblings John, Margot, Frances, Charlotte & Charles. She died in 1995 at the age of 77.

== Education ==
Pinkett went to Dunbar High School. She was admitted to Howard University at the age of 14.

== Career ==
While in school at Howard University, Pinkett began working at her father's real estate and insurance firm, John R. Pinkett Inc. 25 years later, she became president and board chairman of the organization from 1958 until her retirement in 1985. Her father founded it in 1932. She was the first African American woman, and one of the first African Americans, to be admitted into the Washington Board of Realtors. The organization had previously denied her father because he was African American. She went on to serve on the organization's board of directors. In 1972, she was appointed the civilian aide to Army Secretary Clifford Alexander. In 1983, she became the elected president of the Greater Washington Board of Trade, but retired before she assumed the presidency. Over the course of her career, she served on many boards of directors, including Potomac Electric Power Co., Columbia First Savings and Loan, First American Bank, and the D.C. Chamber of Commerce.

== Volunteering and philanthropy ==
Pinkett worked in over 25 civic organizations. She was chairman of the board of the D.C. Board of Higher Education. She was also one of the three founders of Federal City College, which was eventually incorporated into the University of the District of Columbia. She was a trustee of George Washington University. She was also the president and founder of the D.C. Citizens for Better Education. Additionally, she was vice president of the Washington Urban League.

== Activism ==
In 1968, Pinkett was national committeewoman for Robert F. Kennedy's presidential campaign. She also campaigned actively against the Vietnam War. She also advocated for nationwide progress in African American civil rights. SHe was active as a Democratic national committeewoman for the District of Columbia. She was also a member of D.C.'s Democratic Central Committee. In 1974, she was secretary to Walter E. Washington's campaign for D.C.'s first elected mayor. She was an active fundraiser and political advisor for political candidates. She also served on the United States Commission on Civil Rights.

== Honors ==
In 1975, Pinkett was named the Realtor of the Year by the Washington Board of Realtors. Also that same year, she was named Washingtonian of the Year by the Washingtonian. In 1981, she was the first African American woman, as well as the first African American, to be the Greater Washington Board of Trade's "Man of the Year." In 1982, she received the Candace Award. She received the National Brotherhood Citation from the National Conference of Christians and Jews. She was honored by Washington, D.C., with a Distinguished Public Service Award. She also received the Whitney M. Young Jr. Memorial Award for Outstanding Services to Minority Community Life. Additionally, she received the Outstanding Achievement in Business and Community Affairs Award from Howard University.
