= Mary Helen Washington =

American literary scholar (born 1941)

- Born: January 21, 1941 (age 85); Cleveland, Ohio, U.S.
- Awards: Candace Award

Academic background
- Education: Notre Dame College
- Alma mater: University of Detroit

Academic work
- Discipline: English
- Sub-discipline: African American Studies
- Institutions: University of Massachusetts, Boston; University of Maryland, College Park
- Notable works: The Other Blacklist: The African American Literary and Cultural Left of the 1950s
- Website: https://www.maryhelenwashington.com

Mary Helen Washington (born January 21, 1941) is an African-American literary scholar who is the author of numerous books on the African-American female experience. She is best known for her influence on increasing representation of Black authors in education and in literary schools of thought. Washington is a past president of the American Studies Association, and an experienced English professor.

== Early life ==
Mary Helen Washington was born and raised in Cleveland, Ohio, United States. She grew up in a conservative Catholic home during the 1950s Cold War era, and attended Catholic schools throughout her childhood. American Cold War ideologies and reformations in the Catholic Church led by Pope John XXIII heavily influenced her upbringing, but ultimately led her to challenge these views by pursuing left-wing schools of thought.

== Education ==
After high school, Washington attended college to study history and African-American literature. She earned her undergraduate degree from Notre Dame College and subsequently moved to Detroit to attend graduate school in the early 1960s. Living in Detroit, Washington felt deeply connected to the Black community and culture, which led her to become involved with the union activities of the Dodge Revolutionary Union Movement (DRUM). She received her doctorate degree in 1976 at the University of Detroit, becoming the university English Department's first Black graduate student.

== Career ==
After graduating from the University of Detroit, Washington authored many books and she also became involved in academia. She served as the Director of Black Studies at the University of Detroit Mercy from 1976 to 1980 while being a Fellow at the Radcliffe Institute for Advanced Study at Harvard University from 1979 to 1980. She then taught at Mills College before teaching at the University of Massachusetts, Boston, from 1980 to 1990, and at the University of Maryland, College Park, in the early 1990s. Washington is a Distinguished Professor at the University of Maryland, College Park, in the Department of English. She was elected president of the American Studies Association and served in that position from 1996 to 1997.

Washington’s career as an author established her a staple of African-American literature classes nationwide. Her influence is such that The New York Times Book Review observed she "has had a greater impact on the canon of Afro-American Literature than has any other scholar." She is the author of several books of cultural criticism and literary criticism, including The Other Blacklist: The African American Literary and Cultural Left of the 1950s, and has contributed to the PBS documentary series American Experience.

== Influences ==
In her book The Other Blacklist, Washington reflects that her anti-communist upbringing triggered her interest in communist theory and its connection to Black literature. In her work, she shows interest in influential female African-American authors and artists from the Cold War era, and she explores how Leftist views influenced these authors to pursue Black radicalism and literary scholarship. As a political and social justice activist, Washington writes with the goal of challenging the canon of Afro-American Literature. She uses her scholarship to push for schools to teach material by Black women.

Washington's work often integrates ideas of feminism and communism according to Black female experience. In her essay "Feminist Roots", published in Women's Review of Books, she critically engages with feminism’s relation communism, connecting Black feminist movements to 1930s communist labour initiatives. Washington has compiled four anthologies, each with different a focus, under the broader idea of promoting Black female literature.

Washington is the biographer of Paule Marshall, as mentioned in Marshall's obituary in The Washington Post; the biography is to be published by Yale University Press. Washington praises Marshall for the way she "explored a black woman's consciousness and broke out of convention", as well as expressing admiration for the importance of Black females writers' "transnational view of the world". Washington focuses on promoting the scholarship of Black authors and challenging the standards for representation in literature.

== Works ==
- Midnight Birds : stories by contemporary Black women writers. Garden City, N.Y: Anchor Books. 1980. ISBN 978-0-385-14878-8. OCLC 5726621.
- Black-eyed Susans/Midnight Birds : stories by and about Black women. New York: Anchor Books. 1990. ISBN 978-0-385-26015-2. OCLC 19975571.
- The other blacklist : the African American literary and cultural left of the 1950s. New York New York: Columbia University Press. 2014. ISBN 978-0-231-15270-9. OCLC 875819059.
- Invented Lives: Narratives of Black Women 1860-1960. Anchor; Reissue edition (September 1, 1988). 1988. ISBN 978-0385248426.
- Memory of Kin: Stories About Family by Black Writers. Anchor; 1st edition (December 1, 1990). 1990. ISBN 978-0385247832.
- Foreword to Hurston, Zora Neale (2006). Their Eyes Were Watching God. Amistad; 75th Anniversary edition (May 30, 2006). ISBN 9780061120060.

== Notable works ==
=== Black-Eyed Susans (1975) and Midnight Birds (1980) ===
Black-Eyed Susans is a collection of ten stories meant to challenge the stereotypes of servant, wife and mother associated with Black women. Its collection of characters conveys an image of Black women that stresses their complexity and depth.

Five years later, Washington published Midnight Birds as a revision of Black-Eyed Susans that focuses on various aspects of contemporary Black women writers’ experience, exploring issues of poverty, abuse, mental illness and sexuality.

=== Memories of Kin (1991) ===
Memories of Kin is a collection of family-centered stories and poems. Depicting Black families' struggle to uphold traditions from a primarily female viewpoint, the collection explores the way different generations interact within families, especially mother-daughter relations.

=== The Other Blacklist (2014) ===
The Other Blacklist critiques the lack of influential Black literary figures accepted as literary canon. Washington focuses on the lived experiences of influential Left Black literary figures such as Lloyd Brown and Gwendolyn Brooks. Her analysis focuses on archives materials, including interviews and FBI files, to push the literary canon to better represent the role of Black authors in shaping American culture.

== Awards ==
Washington was the 1988 recipient of the Candace Award from the National Coalition of 100 Black Women and has received honorary Doctorate degrees from Bridgewater State College, Emmanuel College, Notre Dame College, Regis College, and Marygrove College. In 2014, she received an honorable mention for the Modern Language Association's William Sanders Scarborough Prize. In 2015, Washington received the American Studies Association's Carl Bode-Norman Holmes Pearson Prize for lifetime achievement.
