= A. Maceo Walker =

American businessman

- Born: June 7, 1909; Indianola, Mississippi, US
- Died: June 8, 1994 (aged 85); Memphis, Tennessee, US
- Education: Fisk University (Bach., 1930); New York University (MBA, 1932); University of Michigan (1935)
- Occupation: Businessman
- Known for: President of Universal Life Insurance Company and TriState Bank of Memphis

A. Maceo Walker (June 7, 1909 – June 8, 1994) was an American businessman who led expansion of the Universal Life Insurance Company, founded by his father Joseph Edison Walker in Memphis, Tennessee. Together with his father in 1946, he founded the Tri-State Bank of Memphis, still in existence today.

Before joining his father full-time in the business, Walker earned master's degrees in business and actuarial science. When he started work in 1935, he was the only black actuary in Tennessee.

== Biography ==
Antonio Maceo Walker, called Maceo, was the son of Joseph Edison and Lela (O'Neal) Walker, and was born in Indianola, Mississippi on June 7, 1909. His father was a medical doctor and entrepreneur. When Maceo was thirteen, the family moved to Memphis, Tennessee, where he attended LeMoyne High School. In 1930, he graduated from Fisk University with a bachelor's degree in business administration. Graduate studies followed at New York University with an MBA in 1932. He subsequently attended the University of Michigan, where he earned another master's degree, this time in actuarial science. At the time of his graduation in 1935, there were no other black actuaries in Tennessee. During the summers between his studies, Walker sold insurance for the Universal Life Insurance Company in Memphis, founded by his father and associates in 1923.

== Career ==
After graduate school, Walker joined the company's audit department. In 1935, he was elected to the board of directors.

In 1938, he married Harriette Ish, with whom he had three children: Lily Patricia Walker, Antonio Maceo Walker, Jr. and Harriette Lucille "Candy" Walker.

In 1946, he and his father opened the Tri-State Bank & Trust Company (now known as the Tri-State Bank of Memphis). In 1952, Walker became president of the Universal Life Insurance Company. Upon his father's death in 1958, the younger Walker also became president of Tri-State Bank.

He ran the Universal Life Insurance Company until 1983, when he turned over leadership to his daughter Patricia Walker-Shaw. Upon her death in 1985, Walker resumed his position as president until he retired for the last time in 1990.

A. Maceo Walker died in Memphis on June 8, 1994.
