= William Sylvester White =

American judge (1914–2004)

the Honorable William Sylvester White
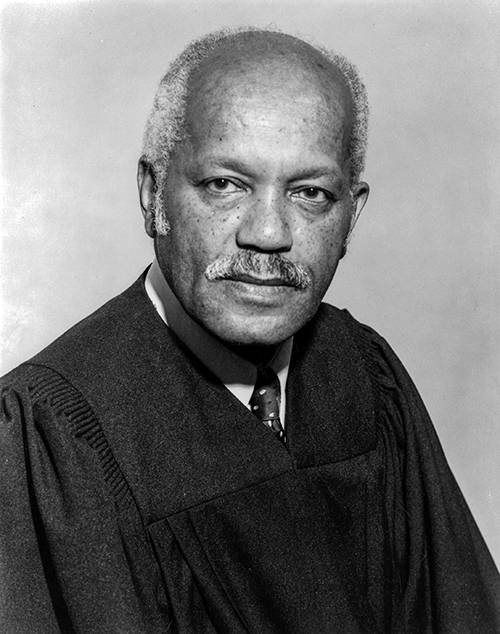

Illinois Appellate Court
- In office 1980–1991
- Appointed by: James R. Thompson

Cook County Juvenile Court
- In office 1964–1980
- Appointed by: Otto Kerner Jr.

Personal details
- Born: William Sylvester White; July 27, 1914 Chicago, Illinois, U.S.
- Died: February 16, 2004 (aged 89) Chicago, Illinois, U.S.
- Spouse: George Vivian Bridgeforth
- Children: Carolyn Marie White Craven; Sala Marilyn White Steinbach
- Education: University of Chicago (BA); University of Chicago Law School (Juris Doctor)
- Awards: Lone Sailor Award

Military service
- Allegiance: United States
- Branch/service: United States Navy
- Years of service: 1943–1946
- Rank: LTJG
- Unit: Golden Thirteen

William Sylvester White (July 27, 1914 – February 2, 2004) was a prosecutor, a member of the first cohort of African-Americans commissioned officers in the U.S. Navy, and the second African-American to serve as presiding judge for the Cook County Juvenile Court.

== Early life ==
Born in Chicago, Illinois, on 27 July 1914, William Sylvester White Jr. was the only child of William S. White Sr., a chemist and pharmacist, and Marie Houston White, a public school teacher. Graduates of Fisk University, his parents imparted on William Jr. the importance of education.

William Jr. attended Hyde Park High School in Chicago, then went on to the University of Chicago, where he received a BA in 1935, and a JD in 1937. Upon graduation, he was hired as an assistant U.S. attorney for the Northern District of Illinois.

William Jr. married George Vivian Bridgeforth and had twin daughters, Carolyn Marie White Craven and Sala Marilyn White Steinbach.

== Golden Thirteen ==
At the outbreak of World War II, many educated African Americans found the calls to defend a democratic ideal in Europe rang hollow as they couldn't enjoy the same benefits in the United States, and launched the Double V campaign to demand that if their sons were willing to sacrifice their lives in the war, they should be given the same opportunities for advancement as the rest of the country.

As a result, by the time William enlisted in the Navy in October 1943, the Navy had decided to implement a trial program, selecting 16 African American sailors as Officer Candidates as a segregated class, now known as the Golden Thirteen. Following William's commissioning in February 1944, he served as a Public Affairs Officer at Ninth Naval District and Naval District Washington until he was released from active duty as a Lieutenant Junior Grade in 1946.

== Later life and death ==
After the war William returned to his role at the U.S. Attorney's Office, then headed by Otto Kerner Jr. Upon Kerner's election as Governor in 1961, William would serve as an assistant state's attorney for Cook County.

In 1964, William was appointed as judge for the Cook County Juvenile Court, eventually rising to become the second African-American presiding judge of the court, and honored by the Cook County Bar Association as Judge of the Year in 1972. In 1980 William served as a justice of the Illinois Appellate Court until his retirement in 1991.

William Sylvester White died at his home in Hyde Park at the age of 89 on February 16, 2004.
