= Carolyn Craven =

American journalist

- Born: Carolyn Marie White; December 28, 1944; Chicago, Illinois
- Died: November 20, 2000 (aged 55); Oakland, California
- Education: Hyde Park High School
- Alma mater: Goucher College; University of California, Berkeley
- Occupation: Journalist
- Television: KQED-TV Newsroom
- Spouses: Eric Craven; Denny Smithson; Ken McEldowney
- Parents: William Sylvester White (father); George White (mother)
- Awards: Candace Award, 1989

Carolyn Craven (born Carolyn Marie White, December 28, 1944 – November 20, 2000) was an American journalist. She was known for her reporting for KQED-TV in San Francisco, and for speaking publicly about being the victim of a serial rapist.

== Early life and education ==
Craven was born in Chicago in 1944, and grew up in the Hyde Park neighborhood. Her father, William Sylvester White, was one of the first African American commissioned as a Navy officer; he later became a juvenile court judge. Her mother, George White, was a school teacher and Chicago library board member. Craven also had a twin sister, Sala.

The family often discussed politics around the dinner table. They had many Jewish friends, and celebrated both Christian and Jewish holidays. According to her sister, Craven later converted to Judaism.

Craven graduated from Hyde Park High School in 1962. She attended Goucher College in suburban Baltimore for two years. She and her boyfriend (later husband) Eric Craven then left to work for the Students for a Democratic Society. She later graduated from the University of California, Berkeley with a degree in African and Afro-American Studies.

== Career ==
In 1970, Craven spent a year writing for ABC network news in New York. She also worked for the news department of KNBC in Los Angeles. She was an associate producer of The Panthers, a documentary on the Black Panther Party.

Craven then began reporting for the San Francisco local news show Newsroom on the KQED public television station. She worked for KQED until 1977, when the station made changes to their news program and her job was eliminated.

During her time on Newsroom, one of the subjects Craven reported on was a serial rapist in Berkeley, known as "Stinky" due to his foul body odor. He had committed at least 60 rapes since 1973. On January 13, 1978, the rapist attacked Craven in the home she shared with her six-year-old son, subduing, blindfolding, and assaulting her for over two hours. Realizing that the rapist must be "Stinky", she gathered as much information about him as she could by feeling his body and clothes with her hands and feet, in order to provide useful evidence to the police.

Craven toured the country, telling her story and urging rape victims to come forward. One of the talk shows she appeared on was Good Morning America, which aired a week-long series on rape.

== Personal life and death ==
Craven married three times, to Eric Craven, Denny Smithson, and Ken McEldowney. She had a son, Gabriel, with Smithson.

Craven had depression and Crohn's disease in later life. On November 20, 2000, she died at Summit Hospital in Oakland, California at the age of 55.

== Awards and recognition ==
Craven received the Candace Award for Journalism in 1989.
