= Global Rights =

Human rights capacity-building NGO

- Formation: 1978
- Type: NGO
- Purpose: Promote and protect the rights of marginalized populations through capacity building
- Headquarters: Washington, DC
- Location: Afghanistan, Algeria, Brazil, Burundi, Colombia, Congo, Morocco, Nigeria, Peru, Sierra Leone, Uganda
- Executive Director: Abiodun Baiyewu
- Website: www.globalrights.org

Global Rights is an international human rights capacity-building non-governmental organization (NGO). Founded in Washington, D.C., in 1978 with the name International Human Rights Law Group, the organization changed its name to Global Rights: Partners for Justice in 2003 on the occasion of its 25th anniversary. In December 2014 it shut its Washington headquarters and devolved the center of its operations to its country offices in Nigeria and Burundi from where the organization continues to work with local activists in Africa to promote and protect the rights of marginalized populations. It provided technical assistance and training to enable local partners to document and expose human rights abuses, conduct community outreach and mobilization, advocate for legal and policy reform, and provide legal and paralegal services.

== Executive Director ==
Gay McDougall was Executive Director of Global Rights from 1994 to 2014. She was one of 16 commissioners on the Independent Electoral Commission helping to ensure fair elections after the fall of apartheid in South Africa in 1994. In her time Global Rights has done work in Cambodia helping to address the lack of legal services since the Khmer Rouge killed the bulk of the country's attorneys.

Abiodun Baiyewu has served as the organization's Executive Director since October 2018. She has led the organization's initiatives in Nigeria, Ghana, Sierra Leone, leading initiatives such as Nigeria Mourns, Rape is A Crime, the West African Mining Host Communities Indaba, and served as the Co-Chair of the African Coalition for Corporate Accountability - an initiative of the organization.
