= Harold B. Jackson Jr. =

American lawyer and judge (1939–2016)

Wisconsin Circuit Judge for the Milwaukee Circuit, Branch 18
- In office August 1, 1978 – December 16, 1985
- Preceded by: Transitioned from 2nd circ.
- Succeeded by: Patricia D. McMahon

Wisconsin Circuit Judge for the 2nd Circuit, Branch 18
- In office January 7, 1974 – July 31, 1978
- Appointed by: Patrick Lucey
- Preceded by: Christ T. Seraphim
- Succeeded by: Transitioned to Milwaukee circ.

President of the Milwaukee Board of School Directors
- In office July 6, 1971 – December 1972

Personal details
- Born: December 28, 1939 Washington, D.C., U.S.
- Died: February 14, 2016 (aged 76)
- Resting place: Forest Home Cemetery, Milwaukee
- Spouses: Rita Suzanne McCabe (m. 1962; div. 1979); Dolores Dross Haig (m. 1980; div. 1985); Kathleen Davis (m. 1998)
- Children: 3
- Parent: Hal Jackson (father)
- Relatives: Jewell Jackson McCabe (sister)
- Education: Marquette University; Marquette Law School
- Profession: Lawyer, judge

Harold Baron Jackson Jr. (December 28, 1939 – February 14, 2016) was an American lawyer and judge from Milwaukee, Wisconsin. He was a Wisconsin circuit court judge in Milwaukee County for 12 years and was the first African American circuit court judge in Wisconsin history. Earlier, he served as president of the Milwaukee School Board and was also the first African American to hold that office.

== Early life and education ==
Harold Jackson Jr. was born in Washington, D.C., on December 28, 1939. He was raised and attended public schools in Washington until age 13. Rather than sending him to Washington's Dunbar High School, his mother opted to send him to Lawrence Academy, in Groton, Massachusetts. He graduated in 1957 with a distinguished academic and athletic record. He received a football scholarship to Marquette University, and when Marquette terminated their football program, they offered him a basketball scholarship instead.

After high school, he was also invited to try out for the St. Louis Hawks, survived the final cuts, and made the roster, but his father convinced him to finish his education instead. He ultimately earned his J.D. from Marquette University Law School in 1967.

== Legal and judicial career ==
Shortly after being admitted to the bar, he was hired as an assistant district attorney in Milwaukee County, working for district attorney Hugh R. O'Connell. He was the first African American assistant district attorney in Wisconsin and was described as one of the sharpest legal minds in the district attorney's office.

In 1969, Jackson left the district attorney's office and started a law partnership with Michael Clark, known as Jackson & Clark. During these years, he also worked as an assistant professor of law at Marquette University. The following year, he was appointed to the Milwaukee School Board, and a year later he was voted president of the school board by the school board members. Again, he was the first African American to hold this office. He resigned from the board in 1972, saying he needed to devote more time to his law practice.

In December 1973, Jackson was appointed a Wisconsin circuit court judge in Milwaukee County, by Governor Patrick Lucey. Once again, he was the first African American to serve in this capacity. He was elected to a full term in 1975, without opposition, and was re-elected in 1981, again without facing opposition.

He resigned from the court in 1986, taking a job as senior counsel for the Milwaukee Metropolitan Sewerage District. For several years during the 1990s, while serving with the Sewerage District, he was also appointed a special master to oversee the implementation of the consent decree on overcrowding in Milwaukee County jail. Where he was entrusted to keep the jail population below a critical level, meaning if new people had to be jailed, he would have to determine which others should be released.

== Personal life and family ==
Harold Jackson Jr. was the son of groundbreaking New York disc jockey Hal Jackson and his second wife, Julia (née Hawkins) Jackson. Jewell Jackson McCabe was Harold Jr.'s young sister.

Harold Jackson Jr. was married three times. He had two daughters with his first wife, Rita Suzanne McCabe, and another daughter with his second wife Dolores Dross Haig. Later in life, he married Kathleen Davis, who survived him. He died on February 14, 2016.

Legal offices
Preceded by Christ T. Seraphim	Wisconsin Circuit Judge for the 2nd Circuit, Branch 18; January 7, 1974 – July 31, 1978	Circuit abolished
New circuit	Wisconsin Circuit Judge for the Milwaukee Circuit, Branch 18; August 1, 1978 – December 16, 1985	Succeeded by Patricia D. McMahon
