= Jennifer Lawson =

Jennifer Karen Lawson (born June 8, 1946) is an American civil rights activist, and Senior vice president at PBS. A brief autobiographical statement from Lawson can be found at the Civil Rights Movement Archive.

== Life ==
Lawson was born in Fairfield, Alabama. She graduated from Columbia University. She was a SNCC field secretary.
