= Joseph Edison Walker =

Leading African American physician, businessman and religious leader

- Born: March 31, 1879; Tillman, Mississippi, US
- Died: July 28, 1958 (aged 79); Memphis, Tennessee, US
- Education: Alcorn; Meharry Medical College
- Occupation: Businessman
- Known for: Founder of Universal Life Insurance Company and TriState Bank of Memphis

Joseph Edison Walker (March 31, 1879 – July 28, 1958) was a leading African American physician, businessman and religious leader. After graduating from college and medical school, he practiced as a doctor in Mississippi, where he was born and reared. He also became president of a bank and an insurance company serving blacks. In 1920 he moved with his family to Memphis, Tennessee for more opportunities.

With associates he founded the Universal Life Insurance Company in 1923, which became one of the largest black-owned insurance companies in the nation under his leadership through 1952. With his son, in 1946 he founded Tri-State Bank, also of Memphis. He also founded the Mississippi Boulevard Christian Church, a congregation of the Christian Church (Disciples of Christ) in Memphis.

== Biography ==
Walker was born on March 31, 1879 (some sources indicate 1880) in Tillman, Mississippi, within rural Claiborne County. His parents were George and Patsy (Wheeler) Walker, who worked as sharecroppers on a cotton plantation. He attended local schools and his parents encouraged him to gain an education.

In 1903, Walker graduated from Alcorn College in Lorman, Mississippi. He graduated from medical school at Meharry Medical College in Nashville, Tennessee. Both are historically black colleges. He returned to Mississippi, where he started a medical practice in Indianola. He worked there from 1906 to 1919.

=== Marriage and family ===
On October 26, 1906, he married Lela O'Neal. They had two children, Johnetta Elmo Walker Kelso (June 14, 1907 – January 5, 1995) and Antonio Maceo Walker (June 7, 1909 – June 8, 1994), both born in Indianola. They had a long life together, and Lela died in 1954.

At the age of 78, Walker secretly married Louise S. O'Reilly, a 30-year-old school teacher, on September 28, 1957.

=== Medical and business career ===
Walker met other educated black men in the Delta, and looked at developing business opportunities to serve the needs of his people. In 1912 he was selected as president of the Delta Penny Savings Bank, one of the businesses started by black people.In 1917 he was elected president of the Mississippi Life Insurance Company.

Following the company's move to Memphis, Tennessee in 1920, Walker also moved his family to that city. Together with A. W. Willis, and Dr. J. T. Wilson, he founded the Universal Life Insurance Company in Memphis, serving as its president until 1952. Under his leadership, it became one of the largest black-owned insurance companies in the country.

Walker was a civic leader who founded Mississippi Boulevard Christian Church in 1922. Later he financed and built the Walker Homes subdivision in South Memphis. He also was active in organizations to support businessmen organizing the Memphis Negro Chamber of Commerce in 1926, which published directories of black businesses. That year he was elected president of the National Negro Insurance Association. He established a good reputation among businessmen in other areas. In 1939, he was elected president of the National Negro Business League. He used all his contacts to create opportunities for black businessmen.

In 1946, Walker and his son, A. Maceo Walker, who had a master's degree in business, founded Tri-State Bank & Trust Company (later Tri-State Bank of Memphis)). They believed that blacks needed more opportunity to get loans to develop new businesses, as well as for their personal lives. In that segregated society, they were discriminated against by white-owned banks. Walker served as president of the bank until his death. His son succeeded him in the businesses and expanded them for his own children as successors.

== Death ==
On July 28, 1958, Walker was shot to death in his office by Judge Washington Hamilton, a former deacon of the non-denominational Mississippi Boulevard Christian Church founded by Dr. Walker. The two men were once close friends, but their relationship began to sour after Hamilton was unable to repay a $8,000 loan. Hamilton attacked Walker with a cane in April 1956, but Dr. Walker refused to file charges against him or hire a bodyguard. Walker's death was widely reported in the media. Journalists estimated that 35,000 came to view his casket as his body lay in state.

Dr. Walker's will, drafted before his second marriage, left the bulk of his estate to his two children. Louise O'Reilly Walker filed a "widow's dissent" with the Probate Court because no provision was made for her in the will.
