= Jewell Jackson McCabe =

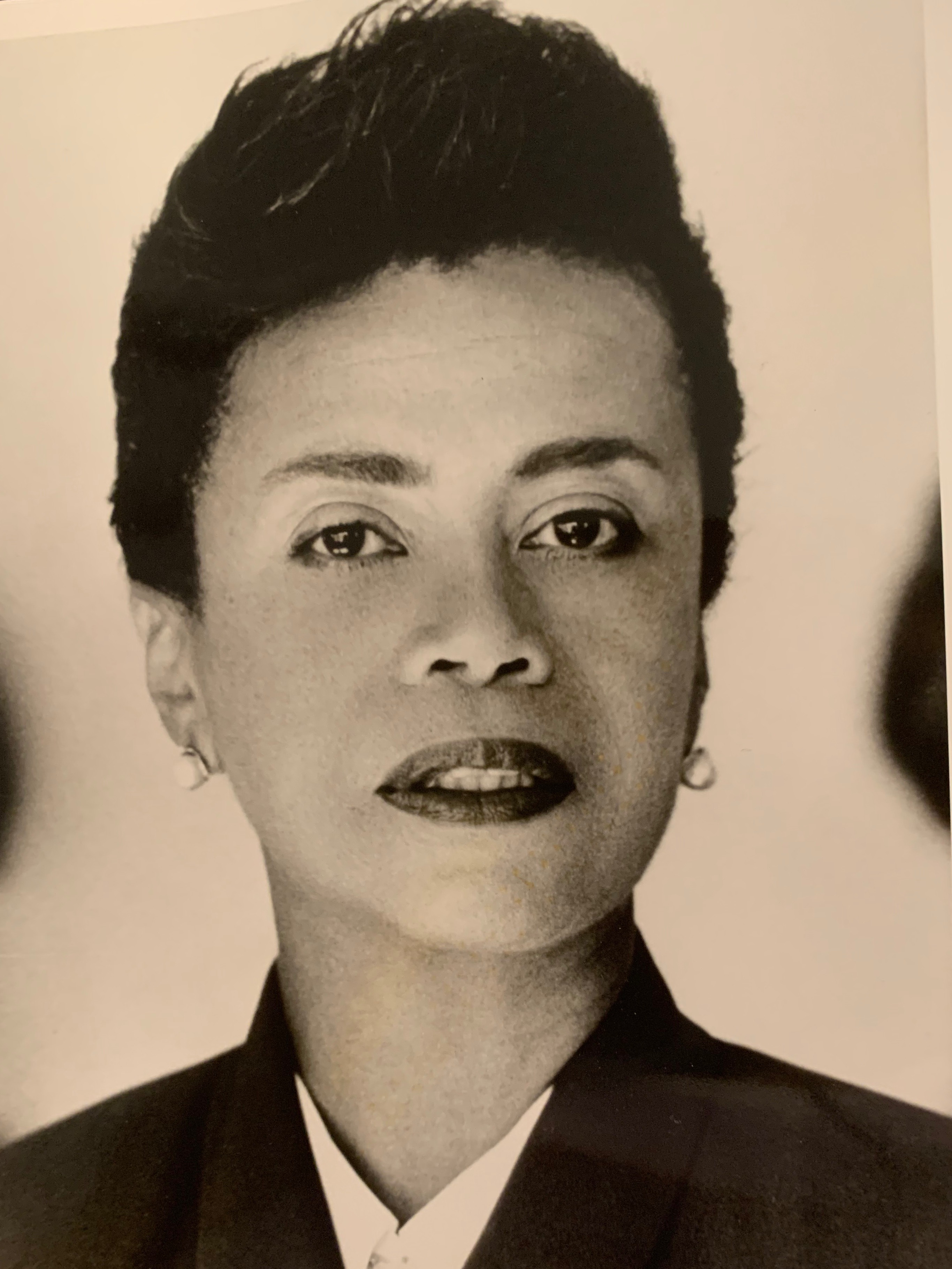
- Jewell in 1993
- Born: Jewell Alyce Jackson; August 2, 1945 (age 81); Washington, D.C., U.S.
- Education: The High School of Performing Arts
- Alma mater: Bard College (BA)
- Occupations: Strategic communications; executive coach; presidential, gubernatorial, mayoral appointee
- Spouse: Frederick E. Ward (m. 1964; div. 1975) Eugene L. McCabe (m. 1975; div. 1984)
- Partner(s): Eugene L. McCabe (1967-1975)
- Parents: Hal Jackson (father); Julia Hawkins Jackson (mother)
- Relatives: Harold B. Jackson Jr. (brother)

Jewell Jackson McCabe (born August 2, 1945) is an American feminist, business executive, social and political activist. She was a leader of, and spokesperson for, the National Coalition of 100 Black Women's movement in the mid to late 1970s in New York City and for the national movement throughout the United States in the early 1980s into the 1990s, as founder of the organization which grew out of her New York City stewardship. In 1993 she became the first woman in 84 years to be in serious contention for the presidency of the civil rights organizations NAACP. Distinguished as an activist Jewell collaborated with several leading African American women leaders of varied and often opposing political ideologies who had in common their opposition to the million man march for excluding black women, including Angela Davis.

== Early life ==
Jewell Jackson was born in Washington, D.C., on August 2, 1945, to Harold "Hal" B. Jackson and Julia [nee Hawkins] Jackson. Hal Jackson [broadcast pioneer] and his partner Percy E. Sutton [politician] started Inner City Broadcasting. ICB began after the U.S. Federal Communications Commission ruled that there be an increase in black radio and television. ICB owned eighteen radio stations including WBLS-FM where Hal was a broadcaster. Hal was known as the "Godfather of Black Radio" and opened doors of opportunity to countless artists – Valerie Simpson and Alicia Keys'performed during Hal Jackson's funeral. Julia, Jewell's mother, was active with The Links, Incorporated, the Urban League Guild, and Jack and Jill. Jewell's earliest influences also came from her paternal aunts. Her aunt Alice [Jackson] Cornish was an elementary school teacher in Washington, D.C., one of the first to integrate Washington, D.C.'s elementary school system in the early 20th century. An accomplished pianist Essie [Jackson] Goldwire was the first black to graduate from the Boston Conservatory of Music. Jewell's older sister was an elementary school teacher. Jewell's older brother, Hal B. Jackson, Jr. was appointed a Milwaukee Circuit Court Judge in 1972 by Governor Pat Lucy, making HBJ, Jr.the first African-American Judge in the state of Wisconsin. Hal Jr. had attended Lawrence Academy in Groton, Massachusetts, (he has been inducted into the Lawrence Academy Hall of Fame) and both Colgate and Marquette University.

== Early career ==
Jewell Jackson McCabe was elected to the board of the Women's Forum in 1975 under the leadership of her friend and colleague founding President Elinor Guggenheimer. In 1977 as part of the campaign to support New York City, during the aftermath of the 1975 fiscal crisis — the Women's Forum represented by Ellen Sulzberger Straus who organized, recruited and joined with Jewell Jackson McCabe, President, Coalition of Black Women and Marife Hernandez, President, of the Conference of Puerto Rican Women — together as co-chairs they formed WUNY (Women United for New York) to promote unity, mutual support and gain recognition for the impact the city's female leadership had on the economic health of New York.

Her strategic communications company is a full service minority owned organization, combining a broad range of marketing skill, competitiveness training on effective internal and external management capabilities. As strategic communications consultant - Jewell institutionalized Panasonic Kid Witness News, running the program for a decade — the company brought the successful program inside creating an operating business unit to take over program management. This occurred after JJMcC Associates developed the Essex County focused Panasonic pilot marketing program for 5th and sixth graders. Jewell expanded the initial 17 elementary schools in the New York City metro tri-state area to 200 schools nationally — in 35 states and the District of Columbia. Jewell's design included methodology utilizing teacher and student training videos. The refreshed design engaged students nationally in competition naming various categories of their videos. Panasonic provided fully equipped video studios per school for their student hands-on video education initiative. A high visibility gala showcasing videos in an annual student competition — culminating in an "A-kid-emy Awards" dinner program for students, their parents and teachers.

On October 18, 1994, the United States William Jefferson Clinton attended the Democratic National Committee Jewish Leadership Forum dinner at the Corcoran Gallery of Art. The President announced his intention to appoint Jewell Jackson McCabe to be the first African American member of the U.S. Holocaust Memorial Council with oversight of the Holocaust Museum, where she was a member of the Holocaust Council's congressionally mandated Committee on Conscience. Governor Mario M. Cuomo appointed Jewell Jackson McCabe to the New York State Council on Fiscal and Economic priorities; he also appointed her chair of the New York State's Job Training Partnership Council.

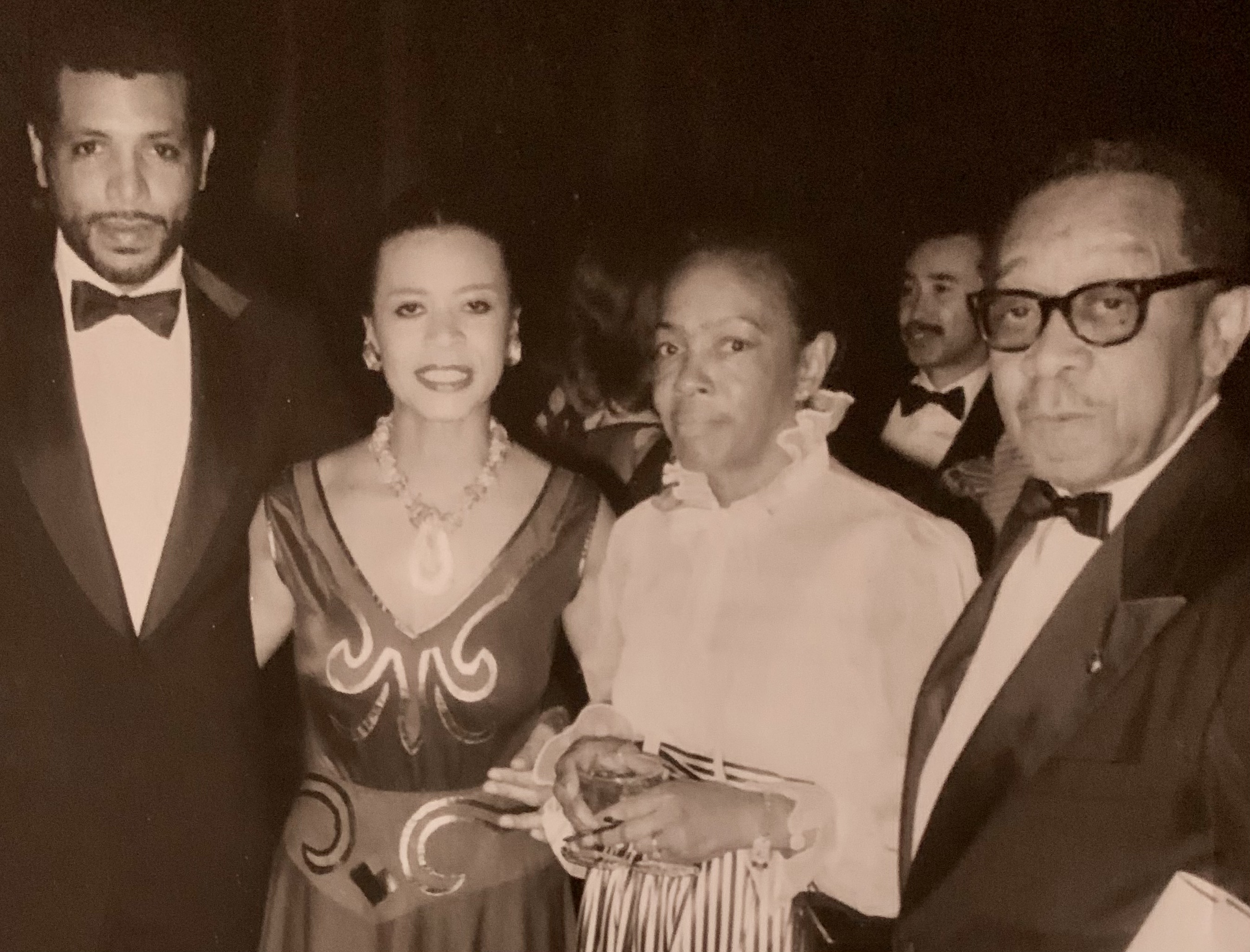
NORTHSIDE CENTER —Where Children Rise Up and Thrive Gala — Left to Right — Eugene "Gene" McCabe, President, North General Hospital; Jewell Jackson McCabe, Founding President, NCBW; Dr. Mamie Phipps Clark & Dr. Kenneth B. Clark, Renowned American Psychologists & Historic Witnesses in Briggs v. Elliott (1952) pivotal case in Brown v. Board of Education (1954).

== Accolades and honors ==
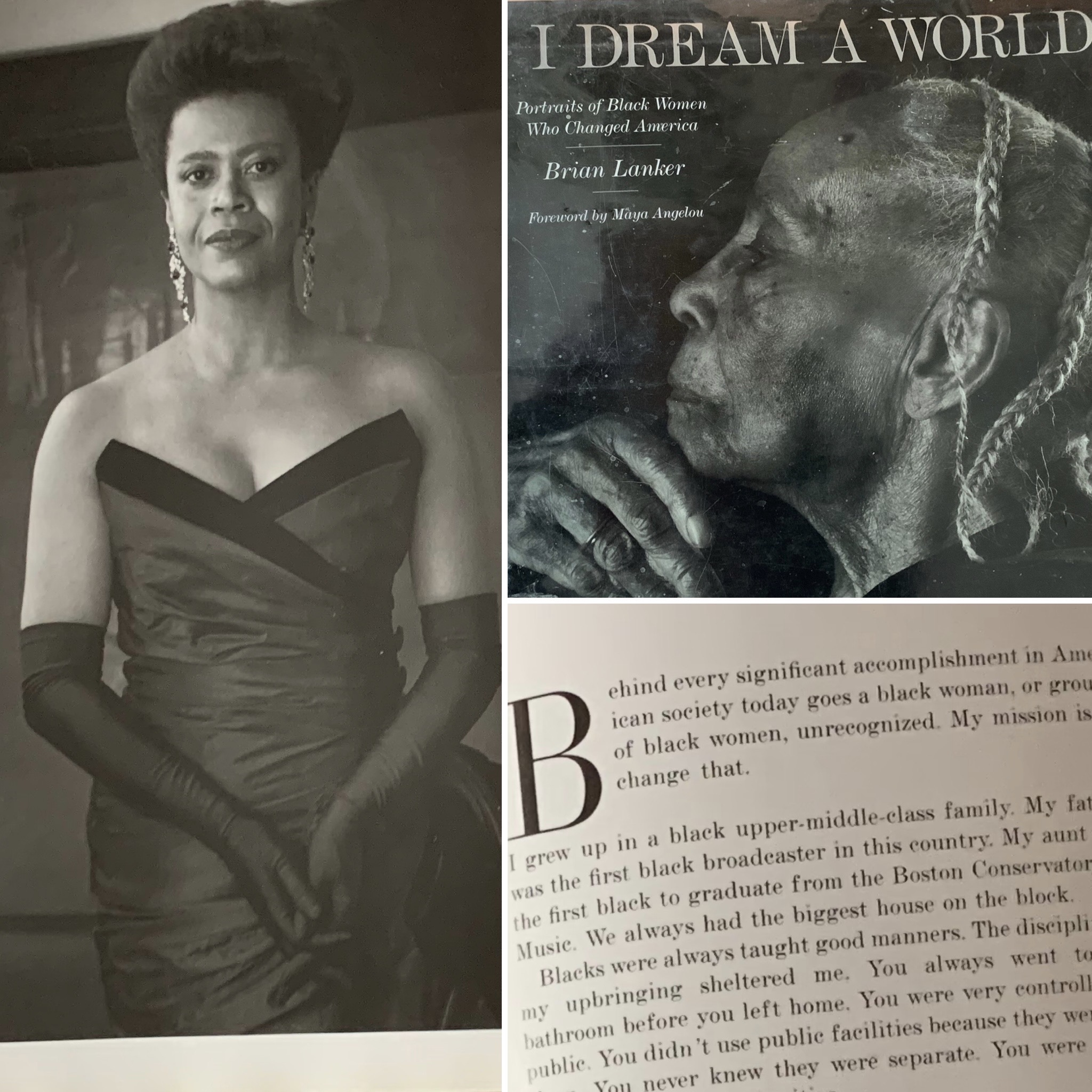
Jewell Featured in "I Dream A World: Portraits of Black Women Who Changed America" — an award-winning and critically acclaimed photographic exhibition by Pulitzer Prize winning photographer Brian Lanker— opened at the Corcoran Gallery of Art Washington, D.C., 1989.

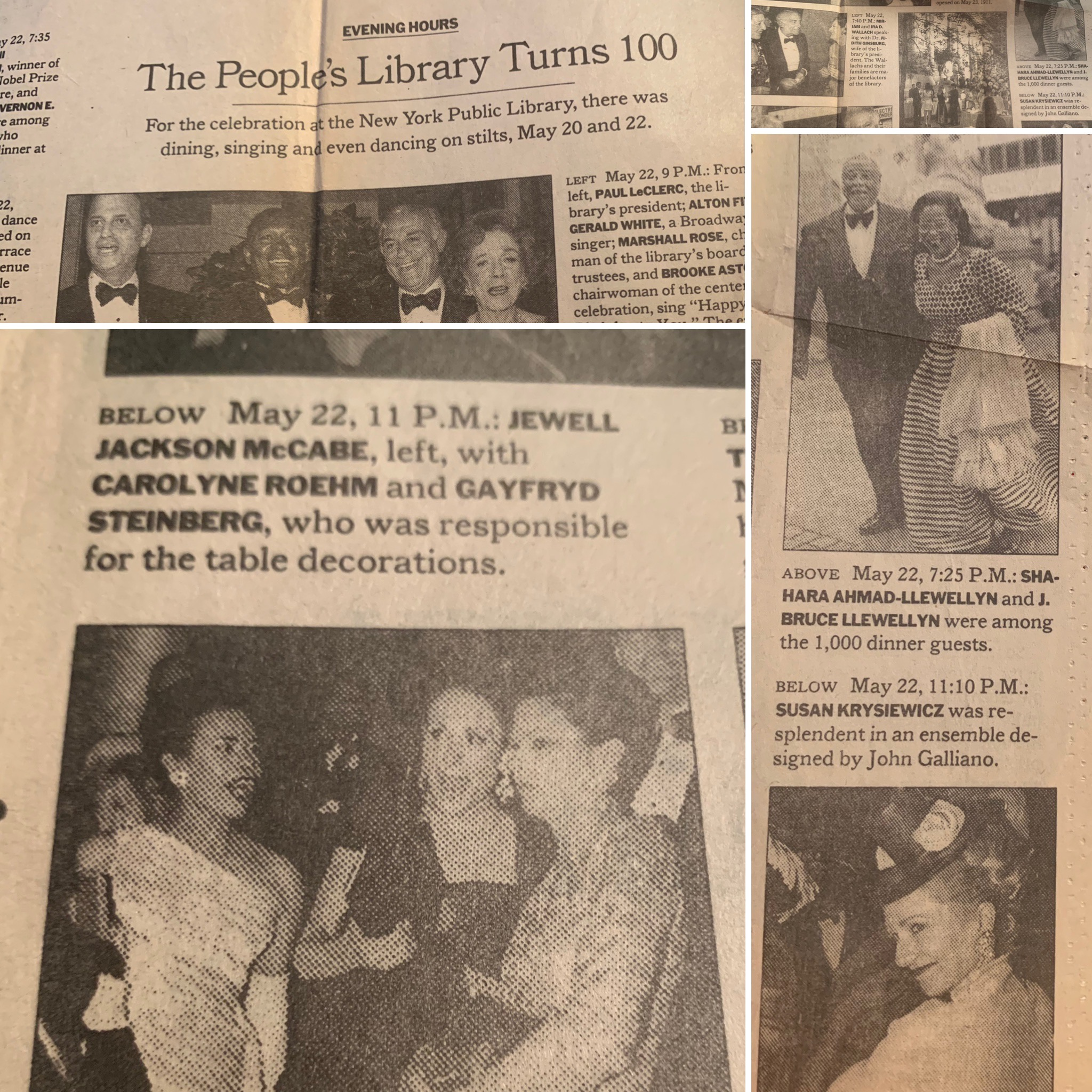
Celebrating the New York Public Library annual gala May 22, 11PM.: Jewell Jackson McCabe, left, with Carolyne Rohem and Gayfryd Steinberg, who was responsible for the table decorations.

Jewell Jackson McCabe became an honorary member of the first black female sorority, Alpha Kappa Alpha founded in 1908.

In April 1993 Jewell Jackson McCabe was the lead candidate of four finalists in the NAACP presidential campaign."
