= National Coalition of 100 Black Women =

United States based non-profit organization

National Coalition of 100 Black Women, Inc.
- Abbreviation: NCBW
- Formation: October 24, 1981; 45 years ago
- Type: Nonprofit organization (501(c)(4))
- Headquarters: Atlanta, Georgia
- President: Virginia W. Harris
- Affiliations: National Coalition of 100 Black Women/Community Services Fund
- Website: ncbw.org

The National Coalition of 100 Black Women, Inc. (NCBW) is a non-profit volunteer organization for African American women. Its members address common issues in their communities, families and personal lives, promoting gender and racial equity.

== History ==
The organization has its roots in the Coalition of 100 Black Women, founded in New York City in 1970 by Edna Beach and 23 other African-American women. Jewell Jackson McCabe, one of the original founders, became President of the New York chapter in 1977 and set out to create a national coalition. Within ten months, the organization had 37 chapters in 20 states. By 1981, the organization had grown to over 500 members, gaining local and national media recognition. They worked with other chapters and women leaders across the United States to form the NCBW. In October 24, 1981, after returning from the National Conference of Black Mayors, it was determined it was imperative to formally extend the institution beyond New York City. As a result, the word "National" was incorporated into the organization's name. NCBW became a not-for-profit organization with representatives from 14 states and the District of Columbia. By 1986, there were 3000 members in 19 states, with 47 chapters altogether. In 1998, the advocacy agenda of the National Coalition of 100 Black Women, Inc. expanded to include other women of color.

== Chapters ==
The National Coalition of 100 Black Women, Inc. has thousands of members with 60 chapters across 25 states and the District of Columbia. Each aspiring to meet the needs of its members, empower Black women, and promote racial equality. Their programs and meetings address diverse issues through the National Coalition of 100 Black Women/Community Services Fund.

== Awards ==
The National Coalition of 100 Black Women, Inc. bestowed the Candace Awards to women of African descent that have made valuable contributions to their communities. The award is named for Candace, the title for queens and queen mothers of the ancient African Kingdom of Kush. The Candace Award presented annually at The Metropolitan Museum of Art NYC —1982 to 1992 — Hosted by Maya Angelou was crafted as a unique civil rights statement — honoring African American Women (and a few good-men) from a cross-section of disciplines in non-traditional roles. The Candace Award was created on behalf of the National Coalition of 100 Black Women by their founding President, Jewell Jackson McCabe.

== See also ==
- National Congress of Black Women
- Candace Award

=== Notable members ===
- Edna Beach
- Martha S. Lewis
- Jewell Jackson McCabe
