= WHFS (historic) =

- United States
- Broadcast area: Washington, D.C.; Baltimore, Maryland
- Frequencies: 102.3 MHz (1961–1983); 99.1 MHz (1983–2005); 105.7 MHz (2005–2008)

Programming
- Format: Progressive rock; modern rock

History
- First air date: November 12, 1961
- Last air date: November 3, 2008

WHFS was the call sign for three successive FM stations in the Washington, D.C., and Baltimore markets that broadcast on various frequencies for nearly 50 years. The first station in the area to broadcast in FM stereo, it was a long-time progressive rock station.

== History ==
=== 1960s ===
WHFS began broadcasting on November 12, 1961, on 102.3 FM in Bethesda, Maryland. Its call sign stood for "Washington High Fidelity Station" (and later as "Washington High Fidelity Stereo) advertising that it was the first station in the Washington metropolitan area to broadcast in FM stereo. It was originally located in a 20-by-20-foot (6.1 m × 6.1 m) space in the basement of the Bethesda Medical Building on Wisconsin Avenue with its antenna on the roof. Its original format was classical, with jazz after 10 p.m. The first employee was Marlin R. Taylor, who started three months before HFS went on the air and left in April 1963. (Jesse) Alvin Jeweler was hired as his replacement. Using the on-air name Jay Allen, he remained with the station as general manager, program director, and audio engineer. Jeweler formed a group that purchased the station in 1963. When he left in 1967, Jake Einstein became part-owner and the station's new general manager. At the time, the station had a broadcast signal of 2,300 watts.

The station was initially moved to Norfolk Avenue in Bethesda and later to Woodmont Avenue—all within a three-block area.

In 1983, The Washington Post reported:

When Mr. Einstein became general manager of WHFS, the station had been on the air for six years and was lucky to draw 800 listeners a night with its format of pop, light classical and jazz. "Then a guy named Frank Richards came in one day wearing cutoffs and a leather vest, played me a tape of rock music from Los Angeles. We were losing so much money that another couple of dollars couldn't hurt, right? So we put him on. My God, the calls! I never knew we had an audience!" In 1969, three would-be DJs—Joshua Brooks, Sara Vass and Mark Gorbulew—approached Mr. Einstein with an idea for a free-form rock-and-roll program. They went on under the name Spiritus Cheese (derived from a cheese company in New York), and a new era was born. "It was Jake's vision that FM radio and rock-and-roll were about to collide," said Mr. Einstein's daughter Rose, who briefly worked at WHFS. "He saw it as an all-night format that would sustain a station." Within months, WHFS was drawing an average nightly audience of 32,700 listeners. Spiritus Cheese lasted just a year—someone complained about a four-letter word in a Firesign Theatre skit broadcast on the air—but by then the station had found its niche.

=== 1970s ===
By the early 1970s, the station phased in broadcasting progressive music nearly all the time. Early on the station still played MOR from 7 a.m. until 4 p.m. when Steve Walker started the rock-and-roll format. Sundays were given to "sold airtime" foreign language programs. Sunday nights reverted to Steve "Pontious" who came to the station from a popular rock station in New Orleans. WHFS studios were now located in a second-floor luxury condo at 4853 Cordell Avenue. The station was also conveniently located directly across the street from the Psyche Delly, a venue for live performances by bands playing the club circuit. Local radio legends (Don) Cerphe Colwell and Jonathan S. "Weasel" Gilbert began their careers when they joined WHFS in the early 1970s. Several part-time DJs such as American University student Mick Sussman handled the overnight and Sunday morning slots.

In early 1971, the overnight show on Mondays, Tuesdays, Wednesdays, and Thursdays was inherited by "littlejohn" (John Hendricks), who stayed until August 1972. His eclectic taste, brought from years of classical music training, mixed with his early upbringing on a farm exposed to country and bluegrass, and later the broad NYC music radio influence of the Pacifica Network, gave his audience blues, jazz, classical, bluegrass and slightly warped sense of humor that fit the late night slot and blended into a bizarre listening choice for late-night workers in the listening radius. Although it was against station policy, there were live interviews and performances. But he always apologized when caught.

At that time, Fridays and Saturdays belonged to David and Damian Einstein, David being, also, the Program Director.

Murray the K hosted the afternoon show in 1972, armed with his own advertising contracts essentially renting a slot for a short while with female partner Judy. In 1972, after Murray the K had left for WNBC (AM) in New York, Ty Ford left his Program Director and on-air positions WAYE to replace Judy. Ford remained at WHFS until 1975, as morning drive announcer, Chief Engineer and Production Director. Ford was quick to admit that Alvin Jeweler was the real engineering brains for WHFS-FM, but Jeweler had allowed his FCC license to expire, so Ford was listed as Chief Engineer. Ford went on to peak his radio career with eight and a half productive years at WBAL and 98Rock in Baltimore before leaving to start his own company.

Many musicians went across the street to do interviews and perform live at the station. Many cut WHFS-specific IDs. One example of a legal ID, done by The Persuasions, "WHFS, it's the station we like the best, we'll be rockin', we'll be rollin', on W - Hhhhh---F-Sssss - - - 102.3 - Bethesda." That was one of many special IDs and live performances recorded by Ty Ford when he was in charge of Production. The interviews by such deejays as "Weasel", who held down the drive-time afternoon weekday slot - about the time that bands setting up across the street were ready for a dinner break before a performance - provided details about the artists' experience, as well as providing plugs for the upcoming appearance.

During the 1970s, WHFS would broadcast music that other FM Rock stations normally overlooked, including cuts as long as 20 minutes. Artists like Frank Zappa, Yes, Genesis, Roxy Music and other non-commercial artists of the time were the normal format. If The Beatles were ever played, their more obscure tracks like Tomorrow Never Knows or Blue Jay Way were used instead of familiar tracks like Hey Jude or Lady Madonna. Once the station played all of Revolution 9. The station made a policy of never playing a "hit" and broke with precedent by leaving the playlists strictly up to the DJs. Once in a while, the DJs would, as a joke, throw in a Top 40 hit just to throw the listeners off. Sometimes, late at night, the DJ might announce "And now we'll repeat that for those of you on drugs," and immediately replay the last song. It furthered the careers of then-undiscovered stars Bruce Springsteen, George Thorogood and Emmylou Harris, who sometimes showed up at the studio. WHFS played the records of many local groups as well, including The Nighthawks, The Slickee Boys, Black Market Baby, Tru Fax & the Insaniacs, Bad Brains and Root Boy Slim and the Sex Change Band."

In addition to the station's progressive rock and alternative music, jazz, and even bluegrass were prominently featured on their format. One of the show's features was "Thor's Bluegrass" hosted by DJ Thor. Local bluegrass band The Seldom Scene would sometimes perform live from the station.

Fans of the station came to expect certain "regular" features. Listeners were treated to Weasel playing "I Wanna Be Sedated" by the Ramones every Friday towards the end of the work day. At 5 p.m. on Friday Weasel would play (You Gotta) Fight for Your Right (To Party!) by the Beastie Boys and Bang the Drum All Day by Todd Rundgren (earlier in the 1980s, Weasel regularly would close his Friday shows with "She Makes Me Rock Too Much" by Ratso and Switchblade and "Here Comes the Weekend" by Dave Edmunds) and also "Party Weekend" by Joe "King " Carrasco and The Crowns. Weasel also filled his playlist with requests like local DC near hit "Washingtron" by Tru Fax & the Insaniacs. The DJs answered the telephone themselves when requests were called in. WHFS made Root Boy Slim's "Christmas at K-Mart" a holiday standard.

Among the station's traditions was the broadcasting of the entire "Don't Eat the Yellow Snow" suite that makes up the majority of the first side of Frank Zappa's "Apostrophe" LP, when the Washington area would experience its first snowfall of the season. And every Thanksgiving, "Alice's Restaurant Massacree" was played, usually by Bob "Here".

According to the Washington Post, the 1978 DJ lineup at WHFS was: Damian Einstein, Jonathan S. "Weasel" Gilbert, David Einstein, Bob "Here" Showacre, Diane Divola, and Tom Grooms. (Cerphe Colwell left the station in 1976. In 2016, Cerphe, with co-author, Stephen Moore wrote a book "Cerphe's Up: A Musical Life With Bruce Springsteen, Little Feat, Frank Zappa, Tom Waits, CSNY, And Many More" (Carrel Books) which documents his years at the station, along with profiles of many of the DJs, staff and the rock musicians he interviewed and featured on his radio shows. His book is now in the Rock and Roll Hall of Fame Archive and Library). Don Grossinger did weekend late nights from 1976 through 1979 and, when Weasel moved to prime time, he took over overnights for two years, through 1981. He peppered his show with surprise rarities and unavailable tracks. Diane Divola came to the station in 1976 and took over the morning show (6 a.m. to 10 a.m.) and held that spot until 1984. Adele Abrams held weekend slots from 1974 to 1988 (and held a full-time shift for nearly two years following Damian's accident). She and Weasel also hosted a live show featuring local band performances called "Take One," which broadcast from the Sounds Reasonable studio in Washington, DC, during the late 1970s. Suzanne Gordon was the progressive format's first news director, hosting five "News of the Universe" segments, and various public affairs features, daily from 1975 to 1977. Susan Desmarais hosted the overnight weekend slots from 1980 to 1983, and went on to 99.1, hosting Saturday and Sunday afternoons. She eventually hosted the 9 p.m. to 1 a.m. slot until 1986.

=== 1980s ===
On July 14th, 1983, Bernie Margolius, his son Philip, Jack Einstein and the rest of the owners under High Fidelity Broadcasters sold the station to the owners of WTOP (1500 AM) for $2.3 million and Einstein used his share to purchase WNAV-AM and WLOM-FM in Annapolis, Maryland. Eventually, WNAV was sold and passed through several owners (including being resold to Einstein in the mid-1990s) until WNAV was ultimately sold to Pat Sajak, the game-show host, in 1998. Einstein was granted the WHFS call letters in roughly October 1983 and WLOM-FM 99.1 became WHFS. Not only did 99.1 operate with higher power than the 102.3 facility, but its transmitter was located halfway between Washington and Baltimore, providing a strong signal to both markets. Eventually Einstein's group sold WHFS. When the station switched formats, it was located at the Infinity Broadcasting Center in Lanham, Maryland. The 102.3 frequency is now occupied by an urban AC station in Washington, using the call letters WMMJ and nicknamed "Majic 102.3".

A daily topical humor "news" show, The Daily Feed by John Dryden of DC Audio, aired for much of the 1980s on WHFS. It featured the sarcastic "Max Nobny" exchanging wit with straightman and nominal narrator, the Baltimore-accented "Frank Benlin", discussing current issues and using classic passion plays such as Star Trek parodies (during the Gulf shipping crisis of the mid-1980s when the U.S. reflagged Middle Eastern tankers) as a comedy vehicle. During Washington Mayor Marion Barry's drug case, a faux–Washington, D.C. tourism promo by the Feed referred to the mayor for life, adding that he "is featured on a totally hidden federal video program".

Sunday broadcasts featured paid foreign language/culture specialty shows in the morning. In the afternoon in the 1980s, Tom Terrell would host Sunday Reggae Splashdown.

WHFS on-air staff included: David Einstein, Damian Einstein, Bob "Here" Showacre, Weasel, Diane Divola, Dave Issing, Milo, Tom Terrell, Neci Crowder, Bob Waugh, Rob Timm, Kathryn Lauren, Pat Ferrise, Johnny Riggs, Gina Crash, and others.

WHFS on-air staff that were also on Jake Einstein and Steve Kingston's WRNR 103.1 included: Damian Einstein, Bob "Here" Showacre, Dave Issing, Bob Waugh, and Rob Timm.

The primary progressive rock station in the nation's capital, WHFS had become famous as a cutting-edge station playing the latest underground music, often months or years before the mainstream. It was the DC area's the first station in the city to play R.E.M., The Specials, Pixies, The Smiths, The Monochrome Set, The Cure, Echo & the Bunnymen, Stereolab, New Order, 311, and Sublime.

=== 1990s ===
In 1990, WHFS launched the HFStival, a multi-artist outdoor concert of one or two days' duration. Initially, it was a small annual concert at Lake Fairfax in Reston, Virginia. After a few years, Robert Benjamin, Bob Waugh and Bill Glasser turned the HFStival into a large festival in Washington, D.C. During these years, the event was headlined by major acts; for example, the 2004 lineup included The Cure, Jay-Z, Modest Mouse, the Yeah Yeah Yeahs, and Cypress Hill. Often held at Robert F. Kennedy Memorial Stadium, the main concert stage was supplemented by culturally significant booths, games, food, and rides, as well as an outdoor second stage.

In 1999, there was an additional HFStival, headlined by Red Hot Chili Peppers, held at the then-new stadium of the Baltimore Ravens.

In the mid-1990s, Liberty Broadcasting published a quarterly magazine titled WHFS Press that was mailed to listeners and available in local music outlets.

in the mid-1990s, it was acquired by Infinity Broadcasting and it became the local modern alternative station. In this period, WHFS featured a specialty show called "Now Hear This", hosted by Dave Marsh, that highlighted indie and local music.

In 1999, WHFS released a New Music New Video Compilation Volume 1 on VHS that was distributed free at Washington area Tower Records outlets. It featured tracks by Cyclefly, Fuel, Fastball, Elliott Smith, Kid Rock, Eve 6, 3 Colours Red, Puya, and Joydrop.

=== 21st century ===
In the first few years of the 2000s, the station combined some underground programming with its modern rock format. No longer playing rather obscure progressive rock, nor the classic and hard rock of its Baltimore competitor WIYY, HFS aimed to reach younger fans who were more apt to listen to Green Day and Fuel than less mainstream artists such as Fugazi or Lou Reed. The station played many of alternative hits touted by the mainstream press and MTV, turning off many old-school HFS listeners, but gaining new listeners aged 18 to 24.

==== Latin music format change ====
The station's ratings slipped to 22nd in its primary market of Washington, although its ratings in Baltimore remained high, giving rise to rumors of a format change.

At noon on January 12, 2005, 99.1 WHFS was switched to a Tropical Latin music format, rebranded as "El Zol 99.1 FM". Its call letters were changed to WZLL for a few days, then to WLZL. The switch was not publicly announced before it happened, and even most of the station's staff were given less than an hour's notice—a common practice in the industry intended to reduce public backlash. New management presided in the air studio as the former format was playing its last few songs. The last song played on the station before the format change was "Last Goodbye" by Jeff Buckley.

AOL, which had a partnership with Infinity Broadcasting and recognized that many people would miss the old WHFS format, quickly launched an internet-only streaming radio station with a playlist much like that of WHFS.

==== Live 105.7 ====
The format change was greeted with public outrage that took Infinity Broadcasting executives by surprise. The story was covered by local TV stations for many days afterwards, and mentioned nationally by The Washington Post, The Howard Stern Show, and The Today Show. The corporate offices of Infinity Broadcasting in New York City were flooded with phone calls and e-mails from irate listeners. An online petition protesting the format change gathered tens of thousands of signatures in only a few days. Media attention was attracted by a public protest in downtown Washington, outside a skate shop where WHFS maintained a remote storefront studio in its last few months. WHFS's main competitor, DC101, paid tribute to the station, airing many memories of WHFS from its DJs and listeners.

In less than two weeks, Infinity Broadcasting resurrected the WHFS format on nights and weekends on Live 105.7 in Baltimore, Maryland, beginning at 7 p.m. on January 21, 2005, with former WHFS afternoon DJ Tim Virgin. The station rebranded itself as "The Legendary HFS, Live on 105.7". Infinity Broadcasting moved the WHFS call letters to the station days later.

==== Move to HD ====
105.7 HFS ceased broadcasting mainstream music on February 1, 2007, immediately before KMS on HFS premiered, yet retained the WHFS call letters traditionally associated with the music the station used to broadcast. During this period the WHFS format was moved to HD radio as WHFS 105.7-HD2 and was known as "HFS2".

==== End of 105.7 ====
On November 3, 2008, WHFS flipped to a sports talk format, similar to that of sister station WFAN in New York City. Along with the format change came a new call sign: WJZ-FM. On November 10, 2008, the WHFS call sign was moved to 1580 AM which dropped its long-time call letters WPGC. The format was changed to talk, with programs hosted by Michael Smerconish from sister station WPHT, Glenn Beck, Bill O'Reilly, Lou Dobbs, and Laura Schlessinger. The station dropped the calls on December 1, 2011, becoming WNEW.

The WHFS calls were then moved to an FM station in West Palm Beach, Florida, otherwise branded as "B-106.3", which previously housed WNEW's calls for several years.

=== Return to 94.7 HD 2 ===
On June 10, 2009, the WHFS alternative format was relaunched as "HFS2" once again, located at WIAD 94.7-HD2 in Bethesda, Maryland and serving the Washington metropolitan area. On January 1, 2012, HFS was removed and replaced with a WNEW simulcast.

=== Baltimore's WWMX-HD2 and translator 97.5/104.9 ===
"HFS" was added to Baltimore airwaves at noon on August 1, 2011. The station was broadcast via two channels: WWMX 106.5-HD2 and W248AO 97.5. W248AO was moved to The Candelabra tower in Baltimore, and the power was increased to 250W.

On April 1, 2014, the 97.5 feed was moved to a new translator at 104.9 W285EJ in White Marsh, Maryland and rebranded as "HFS @104.9", as a result of an agreement with Hope Christian Church; the power is now 10W.

In order to preserve the rights to the WHFS branding and call sign, CBS Radio was required to "park" the call signs on another active station. Thus, CBS moved the WHFS call signs first to a co-owned FM station in West Palm Beach, which was known as "B-106.3" and previously housed the "WNEW" call sign. When that station, along with CBS Radio's entire West Palm Beach cluster of stations, was divested to separate ownership in July 2012, it assumed the WUUB call sign. CBS then moved the WHFS calls to an FM station and an AM station in Tampa, Florida, which both featured a sports talk format.

Following CBS's multi-market station trade with Beasley Broadcasting, which included CBS Radio's Tampa Bay cluster, the WHFS (AM) and WHFS-FM call signs were not changed, and the rights to the WHFS call sign were thus passed over to Beasley. However, on February 4, 2015, after WHFS-FM switched to a rock format, the call sign became WBRN-FM. The station is now WPBB. WHFS (AM), in turn, became WJBR in September 2023.

== Notable on-air talent ==
Notable on-air talent listed by the station of their final appearance:

=== 102.3 WHFS (1968–1983) ===
- Damian Einstein
- Johnny Walker
- Donald "Cerphe" Colwell
- Jonathan "Weasel" Gilbert
- Mary Camille Skora
- Diane Divola

=== 99.1 WHFS (1983–2005) ===
- "Mother Earth" Meg Brulatour
- Neci Crowder (Now on 'Baltimore's Mix 106.5')
- Gina Crash - (Now on 'Today's 101.9 Baltimore')
- Tony "Aq" Acquaviva
- Mark "The Spacey Alien" Daley
- Shari Elliker
- Dave Issing (also on Jake Einstein's WRNR-FM 103.1; WJFK, WNAV, WMUC, WYRE, WTTR, The Lost Generation, and "Inspire with Dave Issing")
- "Wild" Wes Johnson (now the P.A. announcer at Washington Capitals home games)
- Kim Kirkpatrick
- Katherine Lauren
- David Ricklin
- Johnny Riggs
- Tom Terrell
- Billy Zero
- "Zoltar"
- Dave Z (Now on WRNR 103.1)
- Allen Scott (also on Jake Einstein's WRNR-FM 103.1, formerly 'The Underground', now on 'WIYY 98Rock Baltimore' by way of Today's 101.9)
- The Junkies
- Rich Rudel
- Josie
- Tim Virgin
- Mike G
- Pauly Simone
- Bob "Here" Showacre
- Matty
- Jenn
- Rob Timm (Now on WTMD 89.7)
- Bob Waugh

=== 105.7 WHFS (2005–2008) ===
- Chad Dukes
- Dana Meyers
- Rich Rudel
- Oscar Santana

== See also ==
- HFStival
