= Chad Dukes (podcaster) =

American podcaster and radio personality

- Born: Chad Sisson; December 7, 1978 (age 47); Alexandria, Virginia, U.S.
- Occupations: Podcaster, Store owner

Chad Dukes (born Chad Sisson; December 7, 1978) is a podcaster and former radio personality.

He was the afternoon drivetime host of Chad Dukes Vs. the World on WJFK 106.7 The Fan—a sports talk format radio station in the greater Washington D.C. area. He was also a co-host of the Big O and Dukes Show and several other podcasts. As of January 1, 2021, he hosted The Chad Dukes Show, a podcast.

== Early life ==
Chad Dukes, born Chad Sisson, is a native of Burke, Virginia, and a graduate of Lake Braddock Secondary School. He enrolled at George Mason University, where he began his radio broadcasting career working in college radio for WGMU. He left before graduating.

Long a fan of the Washington Redskins, he later became a life long fan of the Tennessee Titans.

== Career ==
Dukes began his professional radio career at 98.7 WMZQ in the promotions department. He became an intern for The Sports Junkiesat WHFS (99.1) in Washington, D.C., where he met fellow intern Oscar "The Big O" Santana. They created the Big O and Dukes Show which debuted at night after Loveline. The show's initial run ended January 12, 2005, when CBS Radio changed the WHFS format to Spanish language and rebranded the station as WLZL "El Zol".

Later that year, the Big O and Dukes Show moved to WJFK/WHFS (105.7) in Baltimore, Maryland, in 2005, where it replaced Out to Lunch Show in the midday (11 a.m.– 3 p.m.) timeslot. Building on a popular segment with former Baltimore police commissioner Ed Norris, the show became Ed Norris with Big O & Dukes. CBS Radio shortly thereafter dropped Dukes and Santana and renamed the program the Ed Norris Show. Dukes moved to ESPN Radio 1300 AM, where he co-hosted an afternoon drive sports/talk show.

In June 2006, Dukes and Santana moved to Phoenix, Arizona, to replace KZON's The Phil Hendrie Show upon the retirement of Phil Hendrie. The Big O and Dukes Show's run in Arizona ended on June 21, 2007, when KZON flipped its format to hip hop, becoming 101.5 JAMZ.

On July 16, 2007, The Big O and Dukes Show returned to the Washington, D.C., airwaves, debuting on WJFK-FM in the evening timeslot (7- 11 p.m.) after the station's flagship Don and Mike Show. In 2008, the show was moved to middays beginning at 10 a.m. following The Junkies and ending at 3 p.m. preceding the Mike O'Meara Show.

On July 20, 2009, WJFK-FM switched formats from hot talk to sports talk radio and became 106.7 The Fan DC. Dukes broadcast "The LaVar Arrington Show with Chad Dukes" with former Washington Redskins linebacker LaVar Arrington from 2-6 p.m. and a solo show called Chad Dukes Vs. The World from 6-7 p.m. from July 2009 until July 2014. The 2-6 p.m. block was renamed Chad Dukes Vs. The World in July 2014 after Arrington departed for a full-time position with the NFL Network.

On July 16, 2010, Dukes and Santana reunited for a weekly podcast styled on their terrestrial radio show.

On October 30, 2020, WJFK 106.7 announced that Dukes was fired from his job at the station for making "racist and other inappropriate comments" on his podcast.

=== Side projects ===
Dukes was co-host of the short-lived Snack and Soda Show. The program ran Sundays on WJFK from 2007–08, with Dukes and producer Matt Cahill broadcasting under the pseudonyms "Snack" and "Soda," respectively. Together they critiqued various snack foods and reported on snack food industry news and rumors. The show's final installment aired April 20, 2008.

Dukes was hosting the Weird and Pissed Off podcast and occasionally The Pinball Shitheads podcast. He and Arrington have hosted "Sportsweek with LaVar Arrington and Chad Dukes" on WDCW. Dukes was the host of The Chad Dukes Wrestling Show Podcast.
