= WNEW =

WNEW may refer to:

== Radio stations ==
=== Current ===
- WNEW-FM, a radio station (102.7 FM) licensed to New York, New York, United States, which has carried the WNEW-FM callsign since 2016, having previously held the calls from 1958 to 2007

=== Former ===
- WDCH-FM, a radio station (99.1 FM) licensed to Bowie, Maryland, United States, which carried the WNEW-FM callsign from 2011 to 2016
- WJFK (AM), a radio station (1580 AM) licensed to Morningside, Maryland, United States, which carried the WNEW callsign from 2011 to 2013
- WESP (FM), a radio station (106.3 FM) licensed to Jupiter, Florida, United States, which carried the WNEW callsign from 2007 to 2011
- WBBR, a radio station (1130 AM) licensed to New York, New York, United States, which carried the WNEW callsign from 1934 to 1992
- WGH (AM), a radio station (1310 AM) licensed to Newport News, Virginia, United States, which briefly carried the WNEW callsign in 1928

== Television stations ==
=== Former ===
- WNYW, a television station (channel 5) licensed to New York, New York, United States, which carried the WNEW-TV callsign from 1958 to 1986
