= Westwood One Sports (radio network) =

Sports radio network

- Type: Sports radio network
- Country: United States

Ownership
- Owner: Audacy, Inc. (producer); Westwood One (producer and distributor)
- Key people: Armen Williams (Executive Director); Bruce Gilbert (SVP of Content)

History
- Launch date: September 4, 2012 (CBS Sports updates); January 2, 2013 (full programming)
- Former names: CBS Sports Radio (2013–2024); Infinity Sports Radio (2024–2025)

Links
- Webcast: Listen live (via Audacy)
- Website: www.westwoodonesports.com

Westwood One Sports (formerly Infinity Sports Network) is an American sports radio network programmed by Westwood One and Audacy, Inc. It debuted as CBS Sports Radio with hourly sports news updates on September 4, 2012, and with 24/7 programming on January 2, 2013.

At launch, programming on the network featured reporters and personalities from CBS Sports, CBS Sports Network, and CBSSports.com. Westwood One Sports is broadcast throughout the United States on radio affiliates and streamed online.

== History ==
The network was originally founded as CBS Sports Radio, which was operated by CBS Radio in partnership with Westwood One, which handled sales and distribution.

In November 2017, Entercom assumed operations of the network after it merged with CBS Radio. It continued to manage the network under a licensing agreement with CBS. The rights to the CBS logo, but not the name, expired at the end of 2019; the rights to the CBS cross-branding—which had originally been scheduled to expire at the end of 2020, ended on April 15, 2024. At this time, the network rebranded as Infinity Sports Network; the name is a nod to Infinity Broadcasting Corporation, a corporate predecessor to CBS Radio.

On October 21, 2025, Audacy announced that the day-to-day operations of Infinity Sports Network would be taken over by Westwood One, and that the network would rebrand as Westwood One Sports on December 29, 2025. The network introduced a new lineup, including a new morning drive show hosted by podcaster Drake C. Toll, new midday show Bleck & Abdalla with Chris Bleck and Adam Abdalla (formerly of WMVP Chicago), and the new late-night show Westwood One Sports Night, whose hosting duties are split between Lynnell Willingham and Josh Graham. The Jim Rome Show (which originally moved from Infinity to Westwood One in 2024) remains its afternoon drive show. Programming from Audacy's BetMGM Network was also incorporated into the national lineup, including the mid-morning show You Better You Bet with Nick Kostos and evening show BetMGM Tonight with Brad Evans and Pat Boyle.

== Stations ==
Westwood One Sports airs on more than 300 stations nationwide. The nominal flagship station of Westwood One Sports is WFAN / WFAN-FM in New York City (although WFAN-AM-FM only carry some brief reports and occasional weekend shows from the network), where some of its programs are produced from. Since WFAS shifted to conservative talk in 2021 (and went silent in 2024), New York City has had no full-time Westwood One Sports network affiliate station, although the network is heard around the clock on an HD Radio digital subchannel of WFAN-FM. WFAS, along with WHLD in Niagara Falls–Buffalo, were among numerous Cumulus Media stations that had been part of the network's core affiliates but flipped to conservative talk.

Audacy also distanced itself from the network when it shifted focus to its own in-house BetQL Network, which features discussions of gambling, in 2021. The BetQL stations continued to carry some Infinity Sports Network programs, including The Jim Rome Show and its late night programming.

Other affiliate stations include:

- WJOX-FM (Birmingham, Alabama)
- KNX-FM (Los Angeles, California)
- KWFN (San Diego, California)
- KESP (San Joaquin Valley, California)
- KAMP (Denver, Colorado)
- WJFK / WJFK-FM (Washington DC)
- WQAM / WQAM-FM (Miami, Florida)
- WZGC (Atlanta, Georgia)
- WSCR / WSCR-FM (Chicago, Illinois)
- KFH (Wichita, Kansas)
- WWL / WWL-FM / WWWL (New Orleans, Louisiana)
- WJZ / WJZ-FM (Baltimore, Maryland)
- WEEI / WEEI-FM (Boston, Massachusetts)
- WXYT / WXYT-FM (Detroit, Michigan)
- KWOD (Kansas City)
- KDKT (Bismarck, North Dakota)
- CJCL (Toronto, Ontario)
- WGR / WGR-FM / WWKB (Buffalo, New York)
- WKRK-FM (Cleveland, Ohio)
- WKY (Oklahoma City, Oklahoma)
- WIP-FM (Philadelphia, Pennsylvania)
- KDKA-FM (Pittsburgh, Pennsylvania)
- WMC (Memphis, Tennessee)
- KRLD-FM (Dallas, Texas)
- KILT / KIKK (Houston, Texas)
- WDUZ (Green Bay, Wisconsin)
- WSSP (Milwaukee, Wisconsin)
- WROC (Rochester, New York)
- SiriusXM Satellite Radio (Channel 158)
