= WHFS (disambiguation) =

WHFS may refer to:

- WHFS, a radio station (1050 AM) licensed to serve Silver Spring, Maryland, United States
- WHFS (historic), a group of radio stations in the Baltimore/Washington D.C. area formerly licensed as WHFS
- WJBR (AM), a radio station (1010 AM) licensed to serve Seffner, Florida, United States, that held the callsign WHFS from 2012 to 2023
- WKVZ, a radio station (98.7 FM) licensed to serve Holmes Beach, Florida, United States, that held the callsign WHFS-FM from 2012 to 2015
- WESP (FM), a radio station (106.3 FM) licensed to serve Jupiter, Florida, United States, that held the callsign WHFS from 2011 to 2012
