= WPGC =

WPGC may refer to:

- WPGC-FM, a radio station (95.5 FM) licensed to Morningside, Maryland, United States
- WJFK (AM), a radio station (1580 AM) licensed to Morningside, Maryland, United States, which held the call sign WPGC until 2008
