= Mix 106.5 =

Mix 106.5 may refer to:

- WWMX (106.5 FM), a radio station in Baltimore, Maryland and still identifying itself as Mix 106.5 as of January 2025
  - KIIS 106.5, a radio station in Sydney, Australia and formerly named Mix 106.5 after WWMX
