= WJFK-FM =

Sports radio station in Manassas, Virginia, serving Washington, D.C.

- Manassas, Virginia; United States
- Broadcast area: Washington metropolitan area
- Frequency: 106.7 MHz (HD Radio)
- Branding: 106-7 The Fan

Programming
- Language: English
- Format: Sports radio
- Subchannels: HD2: Sports radio (WTEM); HD3: Sports gambling (WJFK)
- Affiliations: Westwood One Sports; Washington Nationals Radio Network; Washington Capitals; Washington Wizards; Washington Mystics; Virginia Tech Hokies; Georgetown Hoyas

Ownership
- Owner: Audacy, Inc.; (Audacy License, LLC)
- Sister stations: WDCH-FM; WIAD; WJFK; WLZL; WPGC-FM; WTEM

History
- First air date: April 4, 1961
- Former call signs: WPRW-FM (1961–1968); WEZR (1968–1985); WBMW (1985–1988); WJFK (1988–1991)
- Call sign meaning: John Fitzgerald Kennedy

Technical information
- Licensing authority: FCC
- Facility ID: 28625
- Class: B
- Power: 22,500 watts
- HAAT: 223 meters (732 ft)
- Transmitter coordinates: 38°52′28.4″N 77°13′23.9″W
- Repeater: 95.5 WPGC-FM HD2 (Morningside)

Links
- Public license information: Public file; LMS
- Webcast: Listen live (via Audacy); Listen live (via iHeartRadio)
- Website: www.audacy.com/thefandc

WJFK-FM (106.7 MHz "106-7 The Fan") is a commercial radio station licensed to Manassas, Virginia, and serving the Washington metropolitan area. WJFK-FM airs a sports radio format and is owned and operated by Audacy, Inc.

WJFK-FM's studios are located on Half Street SE near the Navy Yard in Southeast Washington. The transmitter is located in Falls Church, Virginia, near the intersection of Lee Highway (U.S. Route 29) and the Capital Beltway.

WJFK-FM broadcasts in the HD Radio format. It carries two co-owned local sports stations on its subchannels, WTEM and WJFK (AM). WTEM simulcasts WJFK-FM part-time on weekends.

== Programming ==
On weekdays, WJFK-FM has local personalities hosting sports shows in morning drive time, middays and afternoons. Late nights and weekends, Westwood One Sports programming is heard.

WJFK-FM is the flagship station for local broadcasts of the Washington Capitals, Washington Wizards and Washington Nationals. WJFK-FM also clears Westwood One and Sports Radio USA's coverage of the National Football League. For local college sports coverage, WJFK-FM carries Virginia Tech Hokies football and men's basketball as well as Georgetown Hoyas men's basketball.

== History ==
=== WPRW-FM and WEZR ===
On April 4, 1961, the station first signed on as WPRW-FM. It was owned by the Prince William Broadcasting Company and was the sister station to WPRW (1460 AM; now WKDV). The two stations simulcast their programming, directed mostly to listeners in and around Manassas and Prince William County. WPRW-FM broadcast with an effective radiated power of 30,000 watts, but using a 160-foot (49 m) tower, so it was unable to cover the larger Washington radio market. In 1966, the transmitter was moved to the AM site west of Manassas.

In 1967, WPRW-FM was sold to Radio Fairfax-Prince William, a Fairfax-based firm that owned WEEL radio in that city. The transmitter was moved to Fairfax and the call sign changed to WEZR, airing 15-minute sweeps of beautiful music, mostly instrumental covers of popular songs, including Hollywood and Broadway showtunes. Ultimately, the entire company renamed itself EZ Communications later in 1968, later going on to buy other stations nationwide and apply the format there. A further power boost to 50,000 watts, improving coverage in the Washington market, was approved in 1973.

While WEZR and its sister stations remained successful into the 1980s, the easy format was seen as attracting older listeners, while most advertisers were seeking a younger demographic. In 1982, EZ tweaked the format used by its three remaining music outlets—WEZR, WEZS in Richmond and WEZC in Charlotte—to add more vocals.

In the early 1980s, WEZR was a simulcast partner of SuperTV and aired the audio of its concerts in stereo.

=== Top 40 and new age ===
On January 1, 1985, the station flipped to Top 40 as WBMW "B106.7". It was positioned against two other Washington-area Top 40 stations: WRQX, owned by ABC, and WAVA-FM, owned by Doubleday Broadcasting. WBMW was acquired by New York City-based Infinity Broadcasting in April 1987.

Infinity, at first, flipped WBMW to an adult rock format, but it only lasted a few weeks. On May 8, 1987, WBMW switched to new-age music, a forerunner of the smooth jazz format. The station simply called itself "106.7 WBMW". The playlist included jazz-influenced instrumentals and some soft rock titles, with limited chatter from the DJs. This format lasted about a year and a half.

=== Rock and hot talk ===
On October 3, 1988, the station flipped to an album-oriented rock format as WJFK, with the new call sign named after John F. Kennedy. The station became the Washington affiliate for the syndicated Howard Stern Show. This marked Stern's return to the market for the first time since he was let go from rival rock station WWDC-FM in 1982.

Over time, WJFK began adding other talk shows targeted at young men, similar to Stern. Eventually, WJFK had switched over to a full-time hot talk format. Programs on the station during this era include Stern, Don and Mike, Opie & Anthony, G. Gordon Liddy, The Greaseman, Bill O'Reilly, Ron & Fez and the Sports Junkies. In 1991, Infinity began to simulcast WJFK programming on co-owned AM 1300 in Baltimore. That station switched its callsign to WJFK, so 106.7 added an FM suffix and became WJFK-FM. From 1995 to 2005 WJFK-FM was the flagship radio station for the then-Washington Redskins (now Washington Commanders).

Howard Stern departed his terrestrial network of stations in 2005, including WJFK-FM, when he left for Sirius Satellite Radio. WJFK-FM rebranded as "Free FM" in October 2005, as part of Infinity's plans for a nationwide hot talk network. (Two months later, Infinity was renamed CBS Radio.) The Sports Junkies would move from the midday slot to replace Stern as WJFK-FM's morning hosts. However, the Free FM format did not attract enough listeners, and many of those stations switched to other formats. The "Free FM" branding was dropped by WJFK-FM in 2007, even though it continued a while longer as a hot talk outlet under the slogan "Washington's Talk Superstation".

=== Sports radio ===
On July 20, 2009, WJFK-FM became "106.7 The Fan". With WJFK-FM's changeover to "The Fan", The Junkies (who would later change their name back to "The Sports Junkies") were retained, while The Big O and Dukes Show and The Mike O'Meara Show were dropped.

WJFK-FM acquired the rights to Washington Wizards basketball and Washington Nationals baseball. It also began simulcasting Washington Capitals playoff games with WFED starting with the 2008 Stanley Cup Playoffs, later becoming the team's flagship before the 2012-13 NHL season. For college sports, WJFK-FM became the Washington area home of Virginia Tech Hokies football and men's basketball.

On March 8, 2009, WJFK-FM signed on the nation's first HD4 subchannel, carrying co-owned sports station WIP-FM from Philadelphia. This fourth HD subchannel was later dropped, leaving WFAN in New York City on the HD2 subchannel and WJZ-FM from Baltimore on the HD3 subchannel. On June 21, 2021, WJFK (AM) flipped to a sports gambling format, branded as "The Bet Washington", with programming from the co-owned BetQL Network and CBS Sports Radio (now Infinity Sports Network). With the flip, WJFK AM shifted its HD simulcast to WJFK-FM-HD3.

On September 9, 2015, WJFK announced that the station would become the new flagship station for Georgetown Hoyas men's basketball games.

Immediately prior to the 2016-17 NHL season, WJFK controversially declined to renew its deal with the Capitals, with program director Chris Kinard stating he desired a more consistent sports-talk schedule in the evenings. The Capitals were relegated to existing radio affiliate WFED. Since the Nationals and Washington Wizards took precedence on that station, any conflicting Capitals games were left with no home radio coverage at all, leading to complaints from fans and the media. After the Capitals struck a stopgap deal to place its games on WWDC-HD2 and an FM translator midway through that season, the team and WJFK reached a new deal in time for the following season.

On February 2, 2017, CBS Radio announced it would merge with Entercom. The merger was approved on November 9, 2017, and was consummated on the 17th. On December 30, 2020, it was announced that Steve Czaban would be working a Saturday morning show, replacing his weekday afternoon show on WJFK's Entercom sister station, WTEM.

On October 13, 2025, it was announced that WJFK would once again be the flagship station for the Washington Wizards, with any games overlaping with the Capitals airing on former flagship WTEM and WDCH-FM. In addition, it was announced the station would be among those airing TV audio of Washington Mystics games along with WTEM, WDCH and WJFK (AM).
