= Chad Dukes =

Chad Dukes may refer to:

- Chad Dukes (podcaster)
- Chad Dukes (American football)
