= WIAD =

FM radio station in Bethesda, Maryland, United States

- Bethesda, Maryland; United States
- Broadcast area: Washington metropolitan area
- Frequency: 94.7 MHz (HD Radio)
- RDS: PI: 69cb; PS: WIAD Artist Title; RT: Artist - Title
- Branding: Mix 94.7

Programming
- Language: English
- Format: Hot adult contemporary
- Subchannels: HD2: Channel Q

Ownership
- Owner: Audacy, Inc.; (Audacy License, LLC)
- Sister stations: WDCH-FM; WJFK; WJFK-FM; WLZL; WPGC-FM; WTEM

History
- First air date: 1948
- Former call signs: WBCG-FM (1948–1951); WUST-FM (1951–1960); WJMD (1960–1982); WLTT (1982–1993); WARW (1993–2007); WTGB-FM (2007–2009)
- Former frequencies: 103.1 MHz (1948–1950); 106.3 MHz (1950–1960)
- Call sign meaning: the airport code for Washington Dulles International Airport

Technical information
- Licensing authority: FCC
- Facility ID: 9619
- Class: B
- ERP: 20,500 watts (analog); 979 watts (digital)
- HAAT: 235 meters (771 ft)
- Transmitter coordinates: 38°57′49.3″N 77°06′16.9″W

Links
- Public license information: Public file; LMS
- Webcast: Listen Live
- Website: www.audacy.com/mix947dc

WIAD (94.7 MHz) is a commercial radio station licensed to Bethesda, Maryland, and serving the Washington metropolitan area. The station is owned by Audacy, Inc., through licensee Audacy License, LLC, and broadcasts a hot adult contemporary radio format, branded as Mix 94.7. The studios and offices are on Half Street SE near the Navy Yard in Southeast Washington.

WIAD has an effective radiated power (ERP) of 20,500 watts. The transmitter is off River Road in Bethesda. WIAD broadcasts using HD Radio technology, using its HD2 digital subchannel to carry "Channel Q", Audacy's talk radio and CHR/Dance service for the LGBTQ community.

== History ==
On July 6, 1948, the Federal Communications Commission (FCC) granted Broadcast Management, Inc., a construction permit for a new FM station on 103.1 MHz with WBCG-FM as its call sign. On October 18, 1950, the FCC reassigned the station to 106.3 MHz, modifying the construction permit. The FCC granted the station its first license on June 29, 1951.

On September 28, 1951, the station's call sign was changed to WUST-FM. The station's license was voluntarily transferred to WUST, Inc., on September 10, 1958, with an effective date of October 17, 1958.

On January 28, 1959, the FCC granted WUST, Inc., a construction permit to change the station's frequency to 94.7 MHz. The permit allowed the station to increase its effective radiated power (ERP) to 20,000 watts while decreasing the height above average terrain (HAAT) to 245 feet. The station's call sign was changed on April 5, 1960, to WJMD. The FCC granted a new license with the updated facilities on October 1, 1960. The station's license was modified by the FCC on November 30, 1960, to reflect a change in the owner's name to Atlantic Broadcasting Company.

The station aired a beautiful music format. The WJMD call sign was formed from the initials of the previous owners, the Diener brothers (Walter, Jack, Mickey, and Dan).

The FCC granted Atlantic Broadcasting Company a construction permit on November 25, 1968, allowing an increase in ERP to 50,000 watts and an increase in HAAT to 301 feet (later modified to 309 feet). On January 4, 1970, the FCC granted a voluntary reassignment of the station's license to San Juan Racing Association, Inc. The FCC granted the new owners a new license for the station with the upgraded facilities on August 13, 1970, followed by another voluntary reassignment of the license to SJR Communications, Inc., effective December 31, 1970.

During the 1970s, SJR Communications changed the station's ERP and HAAT several times. On August 16, 1973, SJR Communications filed a construction permit with the FCC to decrease the station's ERP to 24,000 watts while increasing the station's HAAT to 670 feet. The permit was modified on May 24, 1974, to 17,000 watts ERP and 776 feet HAAT. The FCC then granted a new license with these facilities on June 18, 1975. SJR Communications was granted another construction permit on November 18, 1976, to increase the station's ERP to 21,000 watts and its HAAT to 780 feet. The FCC then granted a new license following these changes on March 15, 1978.

WJMD evolved into a soft adult contemporary music format with a change of call sign to WLTT in March 1982. Under this format, the station was branded as "W-Lite". The format would last for the next 11 years.

WLTT dropped the soft adult contemporary music format on November 19, 1993, in favor of a classic rock music format branded as "The Arrow". A change of call sign followed to WARW to complement the change in branding to "The Arrow". WARW was also billed on-air as "We Always Rock Washington".

=== 94.7 The Globe/Classic Rock 94.7 ===
On February 2, 2007, an adult album alternative (also known as "triple A") music format was adopted with the branding "The Globe". The new "Globe" format also featured "green" segments between songs or before and after commercials with environmental information. These segments were called "The Green Scene". The station's call sign changed to WTGB on February 15. The airstaff remained the same as WARW's, but some spots were flipped. Weasel moved from nights to mornings, displacing the Stevens & Medley morning team. Mark Stevens, who was part of Stevens & Medley, moved to nights and was eventually replaced by Albie Dee, who would later move to mornings, replacing Weasel, in November 2008, two months after WTGB flipped back to their prior classic rock format. Jerry Hoyt would then take over evenings. The February 2007, shift to AAA left rival classic hits station WBIG-FM as the capital's only analog station broadcasting some form of classic rock. The Globe's HD2 subchannel, then known as "The Jam", began broadcasting a mixture of classic rock.

The call sign appeared similar to Georgetown University's radio station, WGTB. Long time Washington radio listeners remember that station from the 1970s as a champion of the alternative rock of its time. WTGB's former DJs, Don "Cerphe" Colwell and Jonathan "Weasel" Gilbert (he left the station in October 2008), have each been involved with Washington radio for nearly 40 years, including stints for both at WHFS. When the station flipped formats, Cerphe left the air in April 2009.

On August 10, 2008, WTGB dropped the triple A format and began returning to a classic rock format. Three weeks after the change, music director and midday personality Schelby Sweeney quit the station, and was replaced by Marci Wiser, formerly of New York City sister station WXRK. The "Globe" name (but not the "World Class Rock" slogan) stayed, and WTGB-HD2 flipped to a AAA format. The format change was likely because of low ratings; the station stayed in the bottom seven for its entire life as a AAA outlet. On September 1, 2008, WTGB began using the branding 'Classic Rock 94.7 The Globe' on air. On February 14, 2009, however, the station's name would change to simply 'Classic Rock 94.7', like it was for some time while the station was still WARW. A new logo and website followed on March 9, 2009.

=== 94.7 Fresh FM ===
First logo of "Fresh FM", 2009-2014

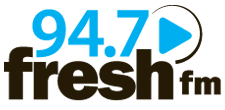
Second and final logo of Fresh FM, 2014-2018

CBS Radio announced on March 30, 2009, that 94.7 FM would be switching to an adult contemporary format at noon on April 6, as "94.7 Fresh FM". It was said to have the same branding as sister stations WWFS in New York City and WCFS-FM in Chicago. CBS aimed to have the new station compete with Clear Channel's adult contemporary WASH-FM, as well as Citadel's hot adult contemporary WRQX (which has since been sold to Cumulus Media and shifted to Top 40, but would shift back to hot AC in November 2015, and became a member station of K-Love in May 2019). The rivalry with WASH-FM was hinted at in various promotion spots using the tagline "None of that washed up old stuff, just fresh new music". The last song on "Classic Rock 94.7" was "Last Goodbye" by Jeff Buckley, and the first song on "Fresh" was "Get the Party Started" by P!nk.

On December 16, WTGB became WIAD, becoming the only Fresh FM station not using "FS" in its call sign. KEZK-FM in St. Louis, Missouri, followed suit the following year.

In September 2010, Zapoleon Media Strategies consultant Steve Davis was hired as Program Director. Davis eliminated the voice tracking of talent from outside the market and brought in a staff of live talent that included Tommy McFly from competitor WRQX. The original live lineup included Davis in mornings, market veteran Kristie McIntyre in midday and McFly in afternoons. This lineup remained in place for six months until McFly moved to mornings to create "The Tommy Show" with noted DC blogger Kelly Collis and former WMAL morning producer Jen Richer. Darik Kristofer from WSTR in Atlanta was brought in to replace McFly in afternoons and Taylor Shay came on board from WIHT to do nights, and was switched to the weekday midday shift (she has since left the station).

Musically, the station evolved into hot AC and was, at one time, considered one of the best in the country in the format. Ratings significantly improved with "Fresh" having the highest ratings in the frequency's history. WIAD quickly became consistently within the Top 5 in the station's target demos.

On February 2, 2017, CBS Radio announced it would merge with Entercom. The merger was approved on November 9, 2017, and the merger was consummated on November 17.

=== 94.7 The Drive ===
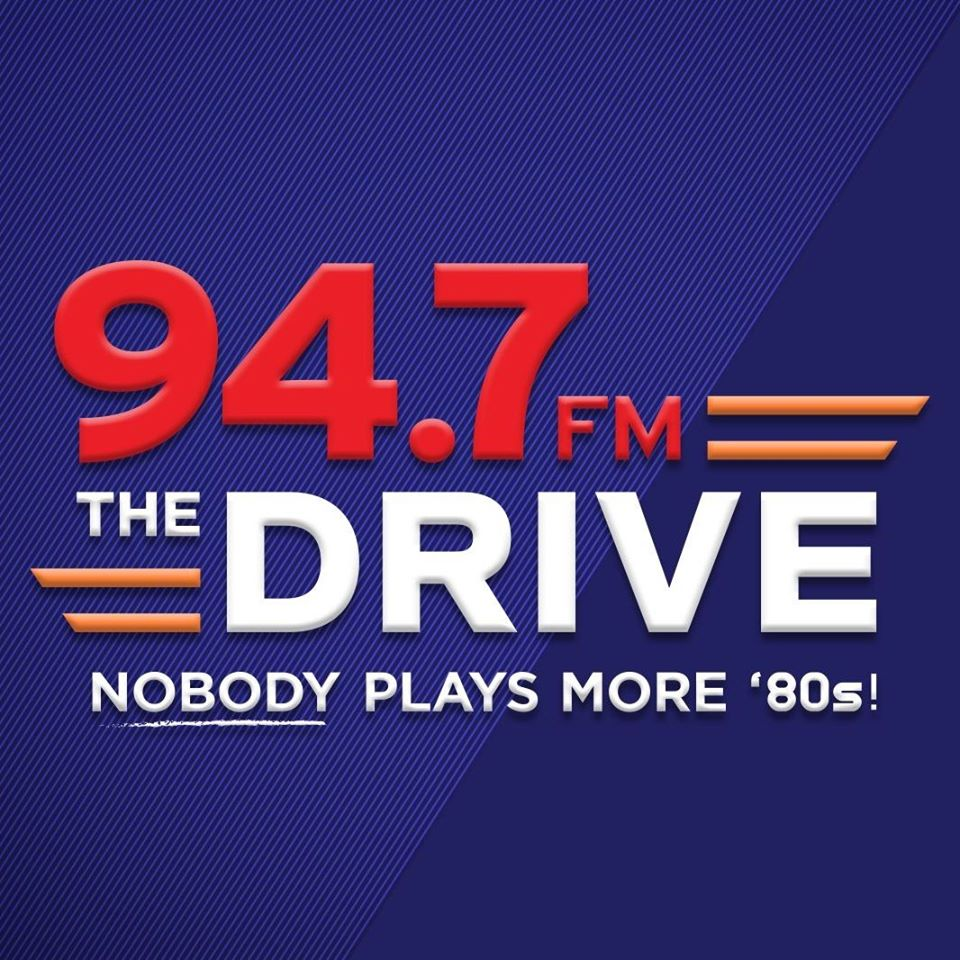
Logo as The Drive, 2018-2026

On October 2, 2018, Entercom released the station's entire airstaff except for afternoon drive host Darik Kristofer. The following day, Entercom announced via a webinar that the station would flip to classic hits as "94-7 The Drive, DC's Greatest Hits". The change took place at 5 p.m. that day. The format focused on rock, pop, and R&B hits from the 1980s, while also extending into the 1970s and 1990s. The last song on "Fresh FM" was "Bitter Sweet Symphony" by The Verve, and the first song on "The Drive" was "Let's Go Crazy" by Prince. In a press release, Entercom said that the Washington metropolitan area was the only major market without a classic hits radio station, and Entercom wanted to capitalize on that opportunity.

=== Mix 94.7 ===
On November 20, 2026, at 3 p.m., after playing a block of departure-themed songs (concluding with "Closing Time" by Semisonic), WIAD reverted to hot adult contemporary, now branded as "Mix 94.7", launching with "Man I Need" by Olivia Dean. Running commercial-free until the 26th, Corrina Delgado, the station's morning host under "The Drive", would move to middays on the 30th, with Mike Adam, voicetracked from New York City, hosting afternoons, and an unrevealed morning show set to debut in early 2027. The move came due to relatively stagnatory ratings for "The Drive" (while it rose from a 2.6 to a 3.3 share between the September and October 2026 Nielsen books, it was still only good for 11th place in the market to end its run and faced increased competition from rival classic rock outlet WBIG-FM). The change, on top of reverting the station's 2018 flip, also brought back the Hot AC format and the "Mix" identity to the Washington market for the first time since May 2019, when Cumulus Media sold what was then WRQX (incidentally, WIAD's competitor until October 2018) to religious broadcaster Educational Media Foundation.

==== HD Radio ====
On June 10, 2009, the station switched the format on its HD2 subchannel from adult album alternative to progressive rock, branded as "HFS2". WHFS was a rock station that broadcast from November 11, 1961, to January 12, 2005, on various frequencies in the Washington area.

On August 1, 2011, "HFS2" was dropped from WIAD-HD2 and moved to WWMX-HD2. However, the next day, "HFS2" was switched back to WIAD-HD2. "HFS2" was dropped again on December 30, 2011, and replaced with a simulcast of WNEW-FM. After WNEW-FM changed formats in December 2015, WIAD-HD2 flipped to a classic hits format as "Classic 94.7". In June 2019, WIAD-HD2 flipped to "Channel Q", an LGBTQ-oriented talk radio/dance music format based in Los Angeles.
