= Tom Terrell (journalist) =

American music journalist (1950–2007)

Thomas Gerald Terrell (July 16, 1950 – November 29, 2007) was an American music journalist, photographer, deejay, promoter, and NPR music reviewer. Born Thomas Gerald Terrell, and later known as Scooter, King Pleasure, and Tom T., he was a lifelong musicologist who recognized talent and trends long before they became popular, and, until his death from prostate cancer, worked to promote new acts in jazz, funk, rock, hip-hop, and world music.

== Early years ==
Born in Summit, New Jersey, Terrell was the only son of Zoma and Thomas C. Terrell. He and his three sisters grew up in the Vauxhall section of Union Township, Union County, New Jersey, and he was educated in the Union Public School District. From an early age he exhibited a facility for music, art, reading and writing, traits that would define his life. A radio station kid, Terrell was mentored in his teens at WNJR by the late Sonny Taylor (an early black radio pioneer), and again later at WMMJ, Washington, D.C.

After graduating from Union High School, Terrell attended college at Howard University in Washington, D.C., in the late 1960s and early 1970s, where he was photographer for the campus newspaper, The Hilltop, and the "Bison" annual, serving as a photo-editor for the 1973 volume. He graduated from Howard in 1972.

== Professional life ==
He made his mark as a radio personality and concert promoter, impacting the music scene as a programmer for WHFS and WPFW, and was an early force behind d.c. space, its non-profit offshoot, District Curators Inc., and the 9:30 Club. Blessed with a honey baritone "radio voice" and encyclopedic music knowledge, his pioneering radio shows included "Stolen Moments" on WPFW, and "Sunday Reggae Splashdown" and "Café C'est What" on WHFS. His music journalism was carried in publications including the Unicorn Times, the Washington City Paper, JazzTimes, Vibe, Essence, Emerge, Savoy, JAZZIZ, Trace, The Village Voice, MTV Magazine, Down Beat magazine, and Global Rhythms. From 2005 until his death, Terrell reviewed music for All Things Considered on National Public Radio. During much of the late 70s, he was frequently employed as a roadie for several touring national music acts (including David Bowie). Terrell also spent many years doing promotion work for several record companies.

Terrell was instrumental in masterminding the U.S. premiere of reggae band Steel Pulse on the night of Bob Marley's funeral, which was broadcast live around the world from the 9:30 Club, 930 F Street, N.W., Washington, D.C., on May 21, 1981, and he later served as their manager.

Terrell wrote the liner notes for the six-c.d. Miles Davis On The Corner box set released in October 2007, which received rave reviews.

== Death ==
A resident of Washington, D.C., Terrell died at the age of 57 on November 29, 2007, due to prostate cancer at the Community Hospice of Washington.
