= WAVT-FM =

- Pottsville, Pennsylvania; United States
- Broadcast area: Schuylkill County, Pennsylvania
- Frequency: 101.9 MHz
- Branding: T-102

Programming
- Language: English
- Format: Hot Adult Contemporary
- Affiliations: Nittany Lions Radio Network; Compass Media Networks

Ownership
- Owner: Pottsville Broadcasting Co.
- Sister stations: WPPA

History
- First air date: November 20, 1948
- Former call signs: WPPA-FM (1946–1969)

Technical information
- Licensing authority: FCC
- Facility ID: 53133
- Class: B
- ERP: 29,000 watts
- HAAT: 171 meters (561 ft)
- Transmitter coordinates: 40°49′50.3″N 76°12′30.7″W

Links
- Public license information: Public file; LMS
- Webcast: Listen live
- Website: T102Radio.com

WAVT-FM (101.9 FM) is a commercial radio station licensed to Pottsville, Pennsylvania, and calling itself "T-102." It is owned by Pottsville Broadcasting Company and broadcasts a hot adult contemporary radio format. The station also broadcasts local high school sports and Penn State Nittany Lions football.

WAVT-FM has an effective radiated power (ERP) of 29,000 watts. The transmitter is on Swatara Road in Shenandoah Heights.

== History ==
The Federal Communications Commission granted Pottsville Broadcasting Company a construction permit for a new FM station on December 26, 1946. The company already owned WPPA 1360 AM, so the new station was given the WPPA-FM call sign. The station signed on the air on November 20, 1948.

At first it simulcast WPPA, but by the 1970s, it was broadcasting its own automated easy listening format. With the change, it switched its call letters to WAVT-FM.

== Signal note ==
WAVT-FM is short-spaced to three other Class B stations:

WFAN-FM "101.9 The Fan" licensed to serve New York City, New York) operates on 101.9 MHz and the distance between the stations' transmitters is 135 miles (217 km) as determined by FCC rules. In addition, WLIF Today's 101.9 (licensed to serve Baltimore, Maryland) also operates on 101.9 MHz and the distance between the stations' transmitters is 99 miles (159 km) as determined by FCC rules. The minimum distance between two Class B stations operating on the same channel according to current FCC rules is 150 miles (240 km).

WIOQ Q102 (licensed to serve Philadelphia, Pennsylvania) operates on a first adjacent channel (102.1 MHz) to WAVT-FM and the distance between the stations' transmitters is 74 miles (119 km) as determined by FCC rules. The minimum distance between two Class B stations operating on first adjacent channels according to current FCC rules is 105 miles (169 km).
