= Mark Daley =

Northern Irish-born American broadcaster

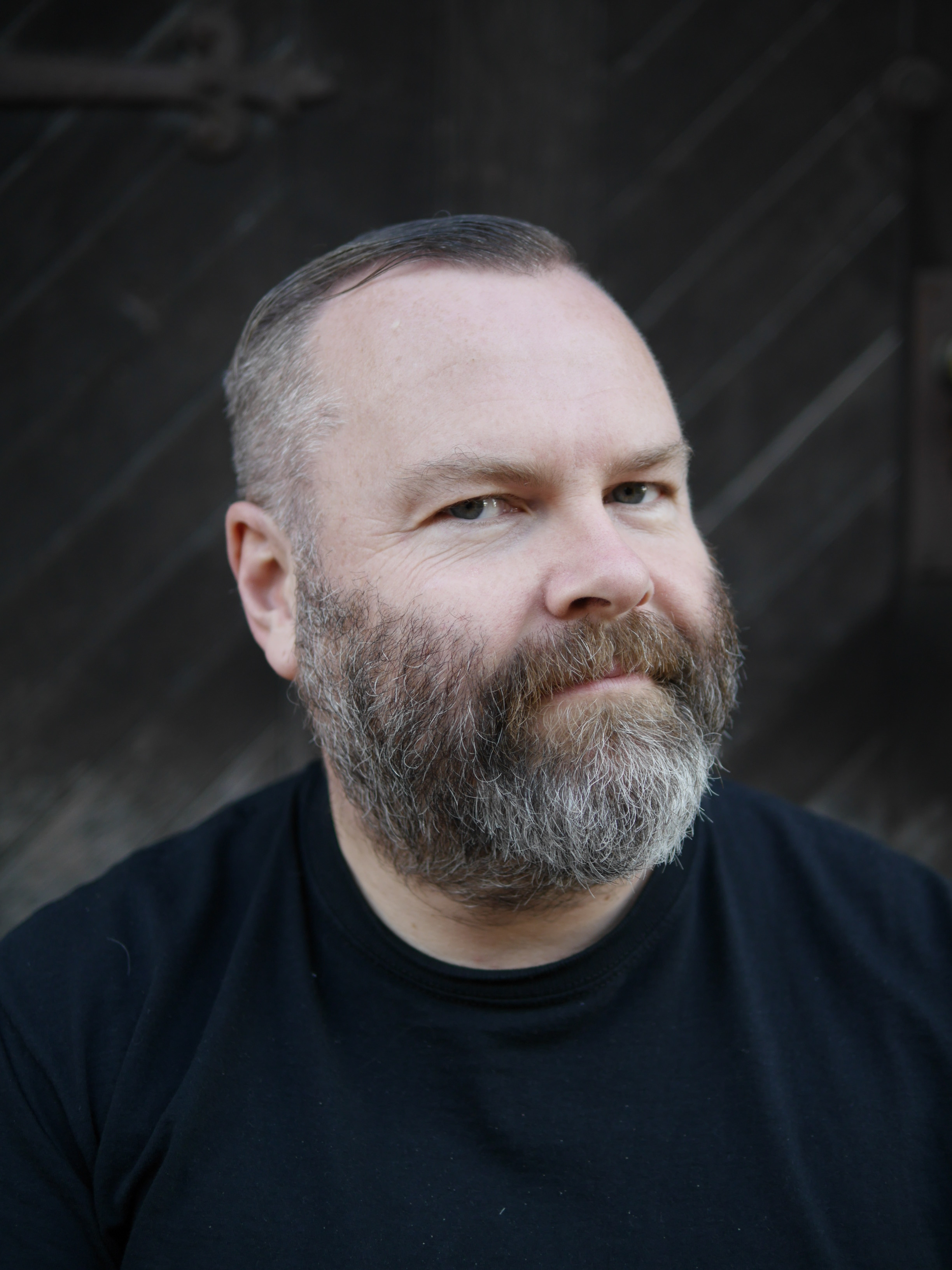
Mark Daley

Mark Daley is an Irish-born American broadcaster.

== Recent career ==
Since 2015, Daley has been a contributor to NPR network news shows on new music.

== Early career ==
Daley’s radio career began at the BBC in Northern Ireland in 1983 as a reporter. He switched channels in 1985 to Downtown Radio where he produced and presented his own nighttime Indie music and talk show—exposing new bands. Moving to London, England in the late 1980s, Daley joined BBC Greater London Radio (GLR), the station programmed by Trevor Dann and whose presenter line-up included Chris Evans, Kevin Greening, Janice Long, and Johnnie Walker. Crossing the Atlantic in 1994, Daley became a Disk Jockey at the influential modern rock station WHFS.

A keen environmentalist, Daley left WHFS in 1999 to create and program Zero24-7 Web Radio, the world’s first internet radio station to mix progressive music with a green progressive message and to be programmed by professional broadcasters. Streaming globally and playing locally, the station was featured in media such as CNN and The Washington Post. Zero24-7 was awarded the 1999 OMB Watch Grand Prize for "effective use of technology in their public policy activities."

As BBC America’s Music Expert/Editor from 1999 to 2003, Daley was at the forefront of exposing UK bands such as The Chemical Brothers, Stereophonics, and The Beta Band to the US audience.

Daley joined the emerging satellite radio revolution in 2000, hosting shows on WorldSpace Satellite Radio channels BOB, The System and UPOP. He was the American and international host of BRIT40 and the music and pop culture show The Daley Planet on Sirius XM Satellite Radio and WorldSpace Satellite Radio. He also hosted numerous specials including most recently the V Festival USA, The Brit Awards, and the UPOP Sessions at Abbey Road.
