= WLIF =

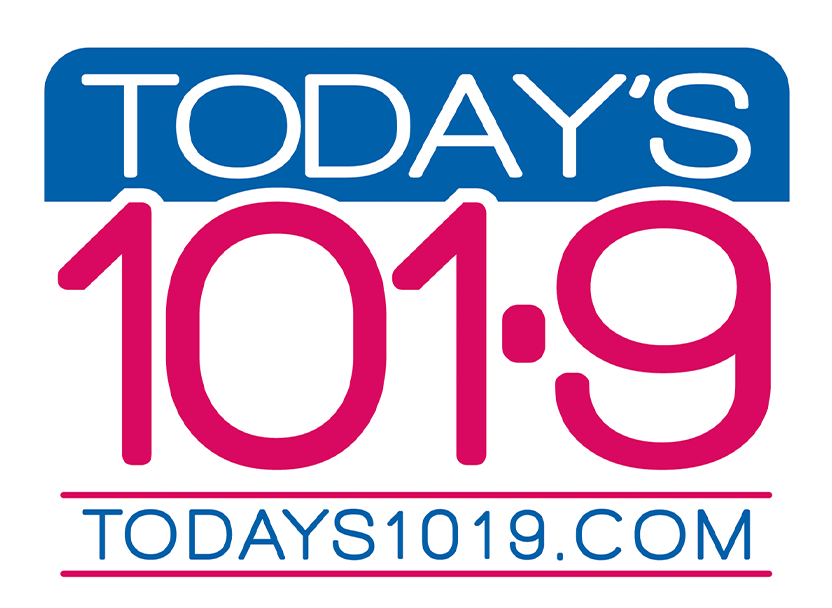
- Baltimore, Maryland; United States
- Broadcast area: Baltimore metropolitan area
- Frequency: 101.9 MHz (HD Radio)
- Branding: Today's 101.9

Programming
- Language: English
- Format: Adult contemporary
- Subchannels: HD2: Urban gospel; HD3: Christian radio

Ownership
- Owner: Audacy, Inc.; (Audacy License, LLC)
- Sister stations: WDCH-FM; WJZ; WJZ-FM; WWMX

History
- First air date: February 6, 1960
- Former call signs: WAQE-FM (1960–1967); WTOW-FM (1967–1970); WLIF (1970–1990); WLIF-FM (1990–1991)
- Call sign meaning: "Life"

Technical information
- Licensing authority: FCC
- Facility ID: 28637
- Class: B
- ERP: 13,500 watts (analog); 645 watts (digital)
- HAAT: 290 meters (950 ft)
- Transmitter coordinates: 39°25′7.4″N 76°33′15.9″W
- Translator: See § Translators

Links
- Public license information: Public file; LMS
- Webcast: Listen live (via Audacy); Listen live (via iHeartRadio); HD2: Listen live; HD2: Listen live (via Audacy); HD2: Listen live (via iHeartRadio)
- Website: www.audacy.com/todays1019; HD2: praisebaltimore.com; HD3: hopefm.net

WLIF (101.9 MHz, "Today's 101.9") is a commercial FM radio station licensed to serve Baltimore, Maryland. The station is owned by Audacy, Inc. through licensee Audacy License, LLC and broadcasts an adult contemporary radio format. Its studios are located on Clarkview Road in the Mount Washington neighborhood of Baltimore, while its broadcast tower is located near Loch Raven Reservoir near Towson. at (39°25′7.0″N 76°33′16.2″W).

== History ==
The station began broadcasting February 6, 1960, as WAQE-FM, simulcasting WAQE (1570 AM). In 1967, the station's call sign was changed to WTOW-FM, and the station simulcast the programming of their then-AM sister station, who changed call letters to WTOW.

In 1970, the station's call sign was changed to WLIF. The station went silent February 18, 1970, and returned to the air on December 24, 1970, after Sudbrink Broadcasting bought the station. Cox Broadcasting would eventually take control of the station in 1977 before selling the station in 1983 to Alan Beck, ex-general manager of the station. In the 1970s and into 1980s, WLIF aired a beautiful music format. The station featured SRP programming (Schulke Radio Productions, created by Jim Schulke). WLIF was one of the highest-rated stations in Baltimore during its beautiful music years.

The station played mostly instrumental renditions of popular songs. Featured artists included Percy Faith, John Fox, Chet Atkins, Richard Clayderman, Frank Mills, Henry Mancini, Ray Anthony, Floyd Cramer, and many others. The station played four vocal selections per hour and they were only smooth vocal stylings of artists like Frank Sinatra, Ray Charles, Nat King Cole, Neil Diamond, Tony Bennett, Patti Page, Dionne Warwick, Barbra Streisand, and others. Its slogan was "The Beautiful Place In Your Life" branded as FM-102. In the 1980s, WLIF began playing more soft rock hits, such as those by Linda Ronstadt, The Beatles, The Temptations, Elton John, along with the previously played artists. During morning and afternoon drives, the station was about half instrumental and half vocal, while other times the station continued to play one vocal every quarter-hour. In the late 1980s, the station shifted to roughly half vocalists and half instrumentals.

By 1990, WLIF had shifted to a soft adult contemporary format, and began to be simulcast on WLIF (1300 AM). This simulcast lasted until September 1991. The station was branded Lite 102. By 1993, WLIF began mixing in current material in its playlist.

In 2001, the station changed branding again, to 101.9 Lite FM. Today, its lineup consists of adult contemporary hits. In the late 2000s, the station carried the syndicated Delilah radio show to complement the popular local love songs programming that was hosted by Fran Lane (Lane left WLIF in December 2019); however, Delilah aired during the late-night hours, and this resulted in its eventual elimination from the station. On the weekends, WLIF featured "The Flashback Weekend" featuring former WQSR announcers Dave Alan, John Summers and Diane Lyn (Lyn left WLIF in July 2019) playing the greatest hits of the 1960s and 1970s. However, in recent years, these songs have been replaced by music from the 1980s, thus creating an "All-80s Weekend"; the eighties songs were mixed in with the sixties and seventies hits during the latter part of the "Flashback Weekend" era.

In addition, WLIF (along with WWIN) also played jazz music during the weekends for many years. WLIF continued to play jazz until 2004, when WSMJ became Baltimore's full-time Smooth Jazz station (that station has since changed formats, first to Alternative in 2008, then to Top-40/CHR a year later).

WLIF logo under previous slogan

On December 29, 2013, at midnight, after playing "It's Beginning to Look a Lot Like Christmas" by Johnny Mathis, WLIF rebranded as Today's 101.9, with its first song being "Hey Soul Sister" by Train. Like its AC sister stations KEZK-FM in St. Louis, WDOK in Cleveland, and KVIL in Dallas, WLIF retooled its format to more hot adult contemporary-leaning fare to attract a new generation of listeners, even though it also continues to play the standard AC songs from the 1980s to present. It was the last surviving "Lite FM"-branded station to be owned by CBS Radio, with the moniker having been dropped from KVIL in Dallas and WLTE in Minneapolis (with the latter station also undergoing a format change to country at the time).

On February 2, 2017, CBS Radio announced it would merge with Entercom. The merger was approved on November 9, 2017, and was consummated on November 17.

== Christmas music ==
WLIF is well known for its Christmas programming. For decades, WLIF began mixing in Christmas music the week before Thanksgiving and went to wall-to-wall Christmas music about two weeks before Christmas. They would remain all Christmas music until the middle of December 26 or later, and would keep mixing in Christmas music until New Year's Day.

Beginning in 2001, every year, starting the week before Thanksgiving, the station plays nothing but Christmas music, well into December 26 or 27. There are no advertisements all day on Christmas Day. After 2007, WLIF played wall to wall Christmas music not only before Thanksgiving, but all the way until New Year's Eve. They were the last station left playing Christmas music at New Year's. Most stations in the market that feature Christmas music continue mixing it in throughout the last week of the year, unlike many places that end abruptly on December 26. In 2010, WLIF dropped Christmas music early on December 27, but continued mixing a few songs in rather than remaining wall-to-wall until January 1. In 2014, WLIF dropped Christmas music at midnight on December 26, drawing negative feedback from many listeners. They continued this practice through 2018. In 2019, WLIF dropped Christmas music on December 29.

== HD Radio ==
WLIF began HD Radio broadcasts in 2006. WLIF-HD2 aired a country format, branded as New Country @ 106.1. The format began on October 25, 2013, at Noon, replacing the 1980s hits "Flashback" format that has aired since WLIF began HD Radio operations. The programming was simulcast on translator W291BA (106.1 FM), which is owned by Hope Christian Church of Marlton, and is being leased to CBS to operate it. WLIF-HD3 formerly aired an oldies format, branded as The Flashback Channel, while WLIF-HD4 airs programming from "HOPE FM" as part of an agreement between CBS and Hope Christian Church where CBS will operate W291BA and another translator, W248AO (97.5 FM), which airs an alternative rock format branded as "HFS @ 97-5" (that format has since been moved to another translator owned by Hope, W285EJ (104.9 FM)).

On April 9, 2015, Radio One announced that they will assume operations of W291BA from CBS, and flipped the format to urban gospel, branded as Praise 106.1, on May 1.

== Translators ==
The following translators are licensed to Hope Christian Church of Marlton, Inc and simulcast the programming of WLIF-HD2 and WLIF-HD3:

Broadcast translator for WLIF-HD2
Call sign	Frequency	City of license	FID	ERP (W)	HAAT	Class	Transmitter coordinates	FCC info
W291BA	106.1 FM	Baltimore, Maryland	141926	250	279 m (915 ft)	D	39°20′5.4″N 76°39′1.9″W	LMS

Broadcast translator for WLIF-HD3
Call sign	Frequency	City of license	FID	ERP (W)	HAAT	Class	Transmitter coordinates	FCC info
W248AO	97.5 FM	Baltimore, Maryland	154229	250	225.8 m (741 ft)	D	39°20′5.4″N 76°39′1.9″W	LMS

== Signal note ==
WLIF is short-spaced to WAVT-FM T102 (licensed to serve Pottsville, Pennsylvania) as they both operate on the same channel and the distance between the stations' transmitters is 99 miles (159 km) as determined by FCC rules. The minimum distance between two Class B stations operating on the same channel according to current FCC rules is 150 miles (240 km).
