= WJZ (AM) =

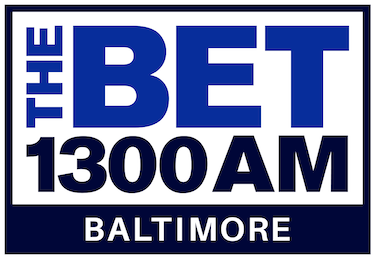
- Baltimore, Maryland; United States
- Broadcast area: Baltimore metropolitan area
- Frequency: 1300 kHz
- Branding: The Bet Baltimore

Programming
- Language: English
- Format: Sports gambling
- Affiliations: BetMGM Network; Westwood One Sports

Ownership
- Owner: Audacy, Inc.; (Audacy License, LLC)
- Sister stations: WDCH-FM; WJZ-FM; WLIF; WWMX

History
- First air date: June 8, 1922
- Former call signs: WEAR (1922–1924); WFBR (1924–1990); WLIF (1990–1991); WJFK (1991–2008)
- Call sign meaning: Taken from WJZ-TV

Technical information
- Licensing authority: FCC
- Facility ID: 28636
- Class: B
- Power: 5,000 watts
- Transmitter coordinates: 39°20′0.38″N 76°46′11.91″W
- Translator: (104.9 MHz) W285EJ (White Marsh)
- Repeater: 105.7 WJZ-FM HD3 (Catonsville)

Links
- Public license information: Public file; LMS
- Webcast: Listen live (via Audacy)
- Website: www.audacy.com/thebetbaltimore

WJZ (1300 kHz) is a commercial radio station licensed to serve Baltimore, Maryland, owned by Audacy, Inc. WJZ broadcasts a sports betting radio format, via the BetMGM Network during the day and evening, with Westwood One Sports airing nights and weekends. Its studios are on Clarkview Road in Baltimore, off Jones Falls Expressway (Interstate 83).

WJZ is powered at 5,000 watts, using a directional antenna with a five-tower array. Its transmitter site is on Clays Lane in Windsor Mill. Programming is simulcast on FM translator W285EJ at 104.9 MHz in White Marsh, Maryland. It is also heard on 106.5 WWMX's HD2 digital subchannel.

== History ==
=== WEAR (1922–1924) ===
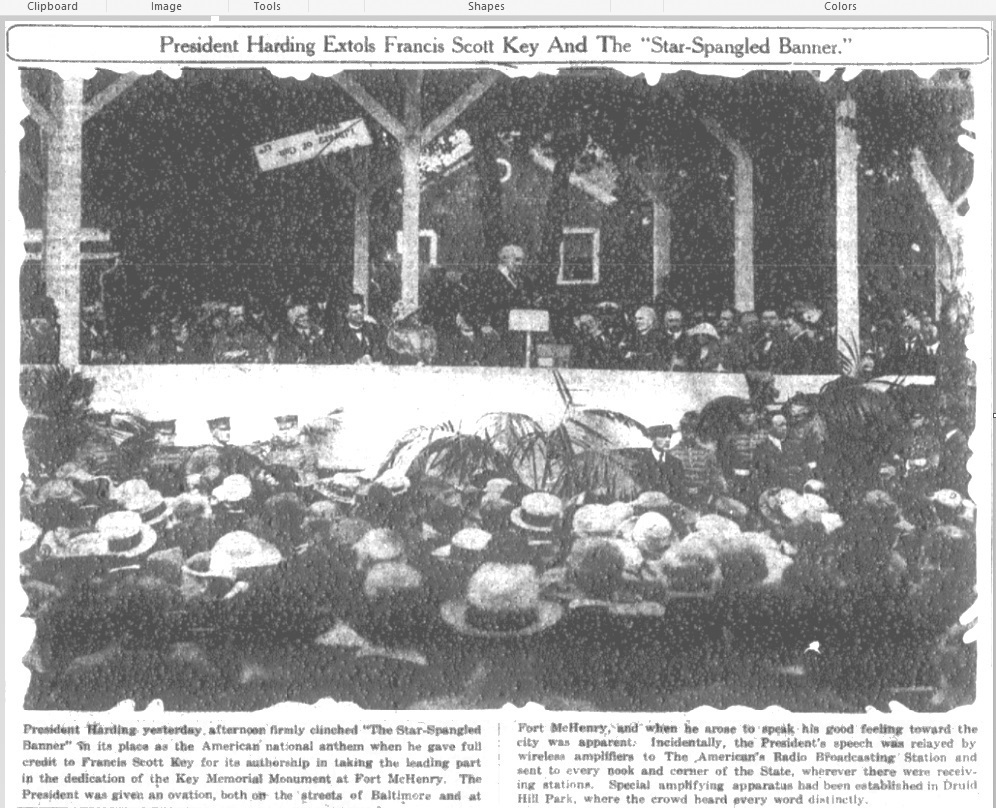
President Harding's speech at the June 14, 1922, Francis Scott Key Monument dedication was broadcast by WEAR. This was the first radio broadcast by a U.S. president over a civilian radio station.

Federal Communications Commission records list the station's "First License Date" as November 3, 1924, reflecting the date an initial license was issued for the station as WFBR. However, the station has traditionally traced its history to a predecessor station, the Baltimore American newspaper's WEAR, which was first licensed in 1922.

Effective December 1, 1921, the U.S. Department of Commerce, in charge of radio at the time, adopted a regulation formally establishing a broadcasting station category, which set aside the wavelength of 360 meters (833 kHz) for entertainment broadcasts, and 485 meters (619 kHz) for farm market and weather reports. On June 3, 1922, the Baltimore American & News Publishing Company was issued a license for a new station on the shared 360-meter "entertainment" wavelength. The station's call letters, WEAR, were randomly assigned from a sequential roster of available call signs.

WEAR was the third broadcasting station licensed in the state of Maryland, following two earlier Baltimore grants: WKC, which had been licensed the previous March, followed by WCAO in May.

WEAR's June 8 inaugural program included a speech from Mayor William F. Broening and live musical performances. On June 14, 1922, U.S. President Warren G. Harding's speech at the dedication of the Francis Scott Key Monument at Fort McHenry was broadcast by the station. This is generally considered the first time a President of the United States gave a speech over a civilian radio station.

In 1924 WEAR was reassigned to 1150 kHz. The station was deleted on October 27, 1924.

=== WFBR (1924–1990) ===
Equipment formerly used by WEAR was acquired to establish another station. On November 3, 1924, the Fifth Regiment of the Maryland National Guard received a license for a station on 1180 kHz. The new station's call letters, WFBR, were also randomly assigned from the sequential list of available call signs; other new stations licensed the same month included WFBK (Hanover, New Hampshire), WFBL (Syracuse, New York), WFBM (Indianapolis, Indiana), WFBN (Bridgewater, Massachusetts), WFBQ (Raleigh, North Carolina), WFBT (Pitman, New Jersey) and WFBU (Boston, Massachusetts). A tradition later developed that WFBR could be rendered as "World's First Broadcasting Regiment". Another slogan, also derived from the call letters, was "First Baltimore Radio".

WFBR's original studios were located at the Fifth Regiment Armory on Preston Street. In 1927, WFBR was sold to The Baltimore Radio Show, a group of investors majority-owned by the Maslin and Barroll families. At that time the station moved to 1230 kHz. With the implementation of the Federal Radio Commission's General Order 40, on November 11, 1928, WFBR was reassigned to 1270 kHz.

WFBR broadcast dramas, comedies, news, sports, soap operas, game shows and big band broadcasts during the "Golden Age of Radio". Arthur Godfrey started his radio career at WFBR in 1930. On August 29, 1931, the station became an affiliate of the NBC Red Network. switching to the Mutual Broadcasting System in October 1941. With the March 29, 1941, implementation of the North American Regional Broadcasting Agreement, stations on 1270 kHz, including WFBR, moved to 1300 kHz. Network affiliation changed to ABC in 1945.

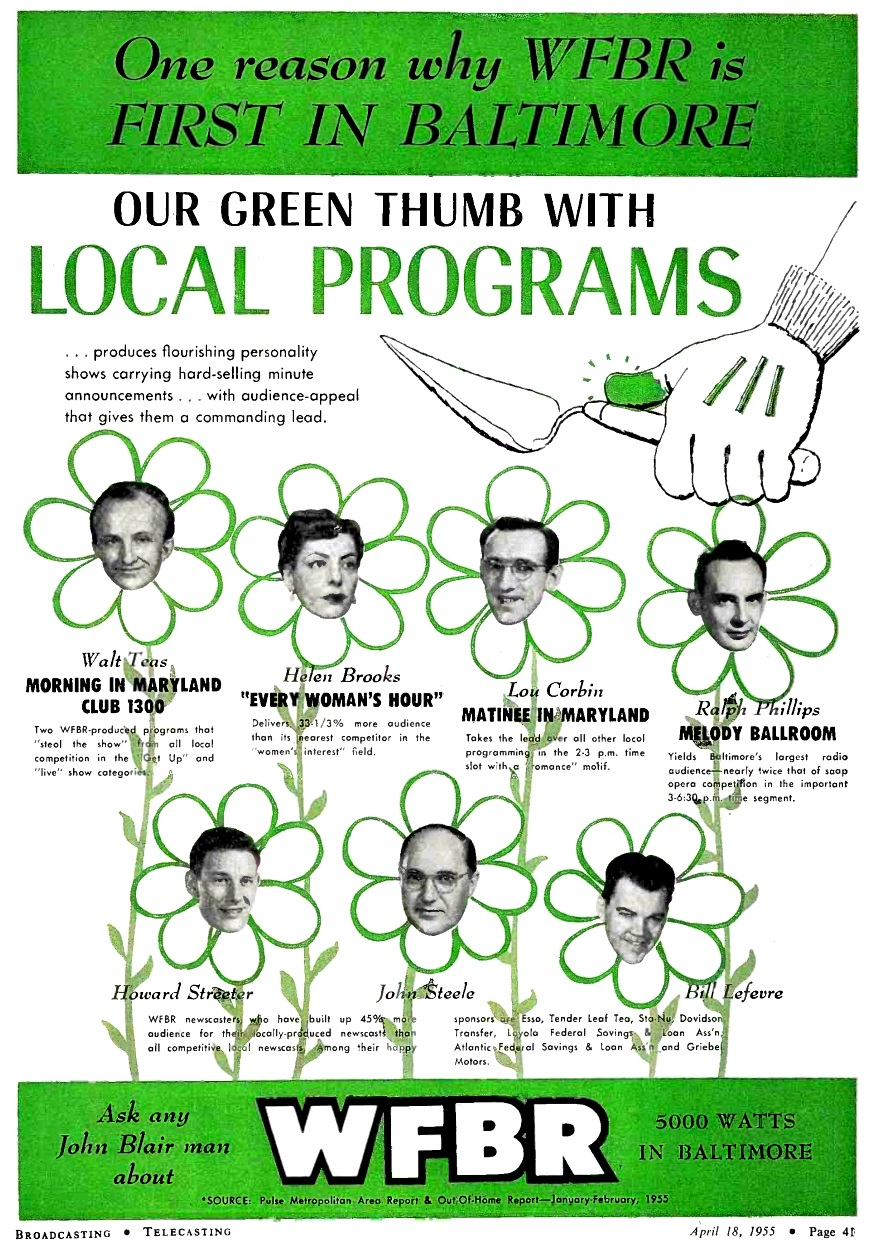
By the mid-1950s, due to ongoing reductions in available network programming, radio stations like WFBR became more dependent on locally originated programs.

In the 1960s, as network programming moved to television, the station switched its format. WFBR was a CBS Radio Network affiliate and was played Top 40 music with a solid news department and extensive local sports coverage. The station had its studios on East 20th Street in Baltimore City, and a transmitter site on the south side of the mouth of the Patapsco River off Waterview Avenue. In addition to sports and music, WFBR had an award-winning news team. One of its most popular news programs was a weekday afternoon panel discussion known as Conference Call, which aired from 1962 to 1988. The award-winning program covered news topics of local, state, and national interests and was moderated by station general manager Harry Shriver. Regular panelists included WFBR newscasters Tom Marr, Ron Matz, Ken Maylath, and station program director Norm Brooks. Additionally, state and local politicians were often invited to appear as panelists as well as other special guests of civic notoriety.

In the 1970s, WFBR's on-air talent featured popular personalities such as "The Flying Dutchman" Pete Berry; Ron Matz, and his fictitious alter-ego, "Harry Horni"; Johnny Walker, a morning DJ who was "cutting edge" for his time; "The Coach", Charley Eckman, a former NBA basketball coach and referee, who later became a Baltimore sportscasting legend; and a young but versatile, broadcaster named Tom Marr who pulled triple duty as the station's news director, morning news anchor, and reporter, while also working as a sportscaster for the CBS Radio Network. For years, WFBR marketed itself as "Mad Radio 13".

From 1979 through 1986, WFBR was the radio flagship station for Baltimore Orioles major league baseball. The team had previously aired its games on WBAL. Under the leadership of Shriver, WFBR promoted the team to new levels and to a younger audience, and created what became known as "Oriole Magic". From 1979 through 1982, the Orioles radio broadcast team featured longtime announcers Chuck Thompson and Bill O'Donnell, along with WFBR veteran broadcaster Tom Marr. O'Donnell left the broadcast team early in the 1982 season due to an illness from which he eventually died later that year. After the 1982 season, Chuck Thompson moved from the radio booth to do the TV broadcasts full-time on WMAR-TV, with Brooks Robinson. Once Thompson left the radio booth, WFBR's general manager Harry Shriver replaced him by hiring the now legendary Jon Miller to team up with Marr on the radio broadcasts.

Musically, WFBR evolved from Top 40 to an adult contemporary format by 1982. The station began to also move from a music intensive approach to more of a full service approach. The station began to add evening talk shows by 1984. After the 1986 baseball season, WFBR was out-bid on the Orioles broadcast rights by rival station WCBM. By that time, Miller was under contract directly with the Orioles and stayed with the team, while Marr was under contract with WFBR and remained at the station to start a successful career as a radio talk-show host. WCBM held the broadcast rights for just one season before its ownership went bankrupt and defaulted on their financial obligation. By this time, WFBR switched to a "news/talk-radio" format; in addition to Tom Marr, hosts on the station during this period included Alan Christian, Les Kinsolving, Joe Lombardo, former Baltimore TV anchor Frank Luber, and Stan "the Fan" Charles. Despite strong ratings, the station was not as profitable under this new format as it was when it held the Orioles broadcast rights.

In 1984, the station began broadcasting in AM stereo. In 1988, WFBR was sold to Infinity Broadcasting (owners of crosstown WLIF), switched to an oldies format, and let go all the on-air personnel from the previous ownership. This format played only music from 1955 to 1965, excluding British Invasion artists. This station focused on artists like Elvis Presley, Everly Brothers, The Crystals, Fats Domino, Ricky Nelson, Frankie Lymon, The Drifters, Jackie Wilson, Roy Orbison, early Motown music, and others. After the sale and format switch, most of WFBR's former on-air personalities moved to WCBM which was under new management at the time, and adopted most aspects of WFBR's news/talk format, which it still airs today. Ratings for the reformatted WFBR were very low as of the summer of 1989. The station would then switch to a business news format, which only lasted for a brief time, and station management eventually changed its call letters, thus successfully killing one of the great radio stations in Baltimore history.

=== WLIF/WJFK (1990–2008) ===
On January 15, 1990, WFBR dropped the business news format, and began simulcasting WLIF, which was about to switch from beautiful music to soft adult contemporary. It became WLIF, a change that required the FM station to become WLIF-FM for several years. (The WFBR call sign has since been used by two stations: 95.3 WFBR-LP of Mt. Washington, Kentucky; and WFBR 1590 AM, formerly WJRO, in Glen Burnie, Maryland, which coincidentally, was the home of the late Charley Eckman.)

On October 1, 1991, the station split from the WLIF simulcast and was renamed WJFK. WJFK was originally simulcast with WJFK-FM, a talk radio station that serves the Washington metropolitan area. This change was precipitated by WJFK-FM's addition of Howard Stern, which was also on Infinity's stations in New York and Philadelphia. This simulcast brought Stern to the Baltimore market.

When the Cleveland Browns relocated to Baltimore in 1996 and became the Ravens, WJFK (AM) was named as the football team's radio flagship station, with games simulcast on WLIF, and later, WQSR. Longtime WMAR-TV sports anchor Scott Garceau was named the lead play-by-play man, with former Baltimore Colts running back Tom Matte as the color commentator. WJFK held the broadcast rights for the Ravens from through the 2005 NFL season, after which the rights were acquired by WBAL. To fill the gap in the team's coverage, WJFK and sister station WHFS aired Baltimore Gameday Uncensored throughout the 2006 season; the show was hosted by former Ravens announcers Scott Garceau and Tom Matte.

On March 10, 2003, the same day WXYV flipped from urban to hot talk, WJFK dropped the simulcast with WJFK-FM and flipped to a full-time ESPN Radio affiliate as "AM 1300 The Jock". WJFK promoted itself as "Baltimore's only all-sports radio station"; however, the station's weekend schedule at the time included infomercials, and WNST also offered a sports radio format, which launched three years prior to WJFK's format change. In 2004, the station rebranded as "ESPN Radio 1300".

=== WJZ ===
Logo as "CBS Sports Radio 1300"

WJFK changed its call sign to WJZ, while WHFS changed its call letters to WJZ-FM, on November 3, 2008, with the FM flipping to local-oriented sports programming, and the AM retaining its full-time affiliation of ESPN Radio (with some limited local weekend programming). Additionally, the callsigns of all three of Baltimore's major-affiliate TV stations have now been used on the city's radio stations; the WMAR call letters were once used on what is now WWMX. WJZ also carries University of Maryland, College Park sporting events, whose rights were previously held by rival station WBAL. On December 10, 2012, ESPN Radio was dropped for a simulcast of sister station WJZ-FM. The station became a full-time affiliate of CBS Sports Radio on January 2, 2013.

On February 2, 2017, CBS agreed to merge CBS Radio with Entercom, at the time the fourth-largest radio broadcaster in the United States; the sale was conducted using a Reverse Morris Trust so that it would tax-free. While CBS shareholders retained a 72% ownership stake in the combined company, Entercom was the surviving entity, separating WJZ radio (both 1300 and FM 105.7) from WJZ-TV. The merger was approved on November 9, 2017, and was consummated on November 17.

On June 21, 2021, WJZ flipped to sports gambling, branded as "The Bet Baltimore", with programming from the co-owned BetQL Network. CBS Sports Radio programming continued to air late nights and weekends. On August 1, WJZ began simulcasting on FM translator W285EJ (104.9 MHz), which dropped its "HFS"-branded alternative rock format.

== See also ==
- List of three-letter broadcast call signs in the United States
