= WDCH-FM =

Bloomberg Radio station in Bowie, Maryland, United States

- Bowie, Maryland; United States
- Broadcast area: Baltimore–Washington metropolitan area
- Frequency: 99.1 MHz
- Branding: Bloomberg 99.1 and 105.7 HD2

Programming
- Language: English
- Format: Business news
- Network: Bloomberg Radio
- Affiliations: D.C. United; ABC News Radio; NBC News Radio; Washington Wizards

Ownership
- Owner: Audacy, Inc.; (Audacy License, LLC)
- Operator: Bloomberg L.P.
- Sister stations: WIAD; WJFK; WJFK-FM; WJZ; WJZ-FM; WLIF; WLZL; WPGC-FM; WTEM; WWMX

History
- First air date: April 22, 1949 (as WNAV-FM in Annapolis)
- Former call signs: WNAV-FM (1949–1983); WLOM-FM (1983); WLOM (1983); WHFS (1983–2005); WZLL (2005); WLZL (2005–2011); WNEW-FM (2011–2016)
- Call sign meaning: Washington, D.C.

Technical information
- Licensing authority: FCC
- Facility ID: 72177
- Class: B
- ERP: 45,000 watts
- HAAT: 157 meters (515 ft)
- Transmitter coordinates: 39°1′48.4″N 76°44′23.9″W
- Repeater: 105.7 WJZ-FM HD2 (Baltimore)

Links
- Public license information: Public file; LMS
- Webcast: Listen live (via iHeartRadio)
- Website: bloomberg.com/radio/

WDCH-FM (99.1 MHz) – branded Bloomberg 99.1 – is a commercial business news radio station licensed to Bowie, Maryland, and serving the Baltimore-Washington metropolitan area. Owned by Audacy, Inc., the station is operated by Bloomberg L.P. as the market network affiliate for Bloomberg Radio. WDCH-FM sometimes airs D.C. United soccer and Washington Wizards basketball games whenever sports radio sister station WJFK-FM (106.7 "The Fan") is carrying a different game.

The studios and offices are near the Washington Navy Yard along the Anacostia River in Southeast Washington, while the station transmitter is in Odenton, Maryland. WDCH is one of the few stations that targets both Baltimore and Washington DC, since its transmitter is located halfway between the two cities, providing a strong city-grade signal to both. WDCH-FM programming is also heard on the HD-2 digital subchannel on 105.7 WJZ-FM.

== History ==
=== WNAV-FM ===
WNAV-FM signed on along with WNAV (1430 AM) on April 22, 1949, with studios located at 89 West Street in Annapolis.

As FM radios were still relatively rare in 1949, WNAV-FM aired beautiful music that was used for "storecasting": a subscription service aimed for stores to use as background music, with limited advertising and announcements aimed at shoppers. Though the broadcasts were not encrypted or restricted in any way, the programming was not intended for reception by the general public; subscribers had specialized receivers to insert announcements for their shoppers. By 1959, WNAV-FM claimed to have 150 supermarket customers in a 100-mile (160 km) radius: west to the Washington metropolitan area, north to Westminster, south to Onancock, Virginia, and east to Elkton.

However, the Federal Communications Commission (FCC) had always scrutinized such "functional music operations" on FM, considering it and transitcasting (a similar concept aimed at bus and streetcar riders) to be an improper use of the public airwaves. It reasoned that if a station could be received by the general public, it should provide programming intended for the general public. In 1955, it first proposed requiring these stations to place their subscription content on a subcarrier, which would need a purpose-built receiver. This was colloquially referred to at the time as "multiplexing", leading to the back-formed term of "simplexing" to refer to the broadcast of content for subscribers. FM stations protested that their potential audiences were so small that they could not survive without the stream of subscription income. After several delays, the commission set the date of the rule change on January 1, 1958. WNAV-FM was one of several FM stations that sought a waiver to continue, but was denied. However, the rule change to require multiplexing was subject to litigation. In 1959, the United States Supreme Court refused to overturn a lower-court ruling which blocked the new rule, and the FCC rescinded it on its own pending further study.

Increasing audiences for FM eventually allowed stations to survive on their own; by 1963, WNAV-FM was one of four remaining FM stations in the country that still performed storecasting, and one of only two outside of the Chicago market. With public opposition now having dried up, the FCC finally banned simplexing effective December 31, 1964; WNAV-FM received an exemption through July 1, 1965, which allowed it time to install a new 50 kW transmitter. It continued with the beautiful music format.

In 1983, the station changed its call sign to WLOM-FM.

=== WHFS ===
In 1983 the owners of WHFS, then licensed to Bethesda at 102.3 FM, sold that station for $2 million and used the money to purchase WLOM and WNAV. The WHFS progressive rock format and call letters were then moved to 99.1 FM, licensed to operate with 50,000 watts with much higher power than the 102.3 facility, which broadcasts with only 3,000 watts. Thus WHFS on 99.1 could then be heard in Baltimore, Washington, and much of the Eastern Shore of Maryland.

In the 1990s, WHFS hosted an event called the HFStival, an annual day-long outdoor concert. The concert, often held at Washington's RFK Stadium, featured a variety local and national acts. The 2004 lineup included The Cure, Jay-Z, Modest Mouse, the Yeah Yeah Yeahs, and Cypress Hill. Robert Benjamin, Bob Waugh and Bill Glasser took the HFStival from a small yearly concert in Fairfax, Virginia, to a large festival in Washington, D.C. that was headlined by major acts and was surrounded by culturally significant booths, games, food, and rides, as well as an outdoor second stage. Amongst others, Billy Zero was instrumental in growing the HFStival Locals Only Stage where bands like Good Charlotte and Jimmie's Chicken Shack got their big break.

Also in the 1990s, Liberty Broadcasting published a quarterly magazine titled "WHFS Press" that was mailed to listeners and available in local music outlets.

Under Infinity Broadcasting ownership, the station became an alternative rock station in the mid-1990s. The station played much of the alternative hits that were touted by the mainstream press and MTV aimed at music fans in their 20s and 30s.

During this period, WHFS featured a specialty show called "Now Hear This", hosted by Dave Marsh, which highlighted indie and local music. In 1999, WHFS released a New Music New Video Compilation Volume 1 on VHS that was distributed free at Washington area Tower Records outlets. It featured tracks by Cyclefly, Fuel, Fastball, Elliott Smith, Kid Rock, Eve 6, 3 Colours Red, Puya, and Joydrop.

=== "El Zol 99.1 FM" ===
At noon on January 12, 2005, 99.1 switched to a tropical Latin music format. Its call letters were changed to WZLL on January 28, 2005, and then again to WLZL on February 5, 2005, and the station was rebranded as "El Zol 99.1 FM". AOL, which had a partnership with Infinity Broadcasting and recognized that many people would miss the old WHFS format, quickly launched an internet-only streaming radio station with a playlist much like that of WHFS.

Due to numerous complaints about the format change, which attracted media attention, Infinity brought the WHFS format back a month later on the 105.7 FM frequency (now WJZ-FM). The WHFS call letters have since relocated first to a talk station on 1580 AM (now WJFK), then to a sister station in West Palm Beach, Florida. WLZL was CBS Radio's first Spanish radio station.

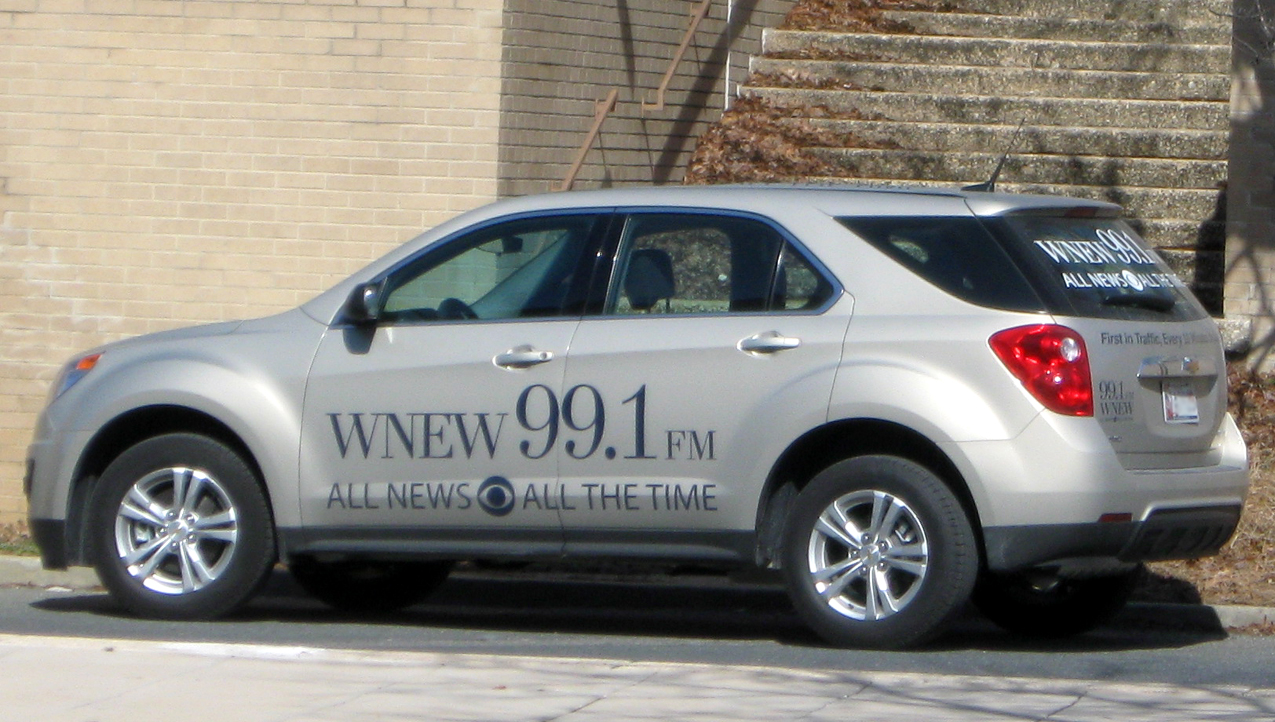
A WNEW Chevrolet Equinox news vehicle

=== All-news WNEW-FM ===
On November 16, 2011, CBS Radio announced plans to acquire WFSI (107.9 MHz) from religious broadcaster Family Radio, with the intention of moving WLZL's Spanish tropical format and "El Zol" branding from 99.1 to 107.9, with a new all-news format launched on 99.1 FM to compete directly with the region's leading all-news format station, long-time powerhouse WTOP-FM. The 99.1 MHz frequency then adopted the WNEW-FM call sign, which was named after the former AM and FM stations of the same name in New York City. The format change occurred on December 1, when 99.1 and 107.9 both began simulcasting El Zol. El Zol was finally moved to 107.9 on December 12, 2011, and 99.1 began stunting with Christmas music, with the WNEW-FM call letters now in place on 99.1. On December 27, 2011, WNEW-FM ended its Christmas music stunting and began stunting with the 1981 Silver Anniversary Edition of The History of Rock and Roll.

Logo as All News 99.1, 2012–15

The all-news format launched at noon on January 22, 2012. The station initially planned to launch at 5 a.m. on January 19, but postponed it due to technical problems. The station also had broadcast simultaneously in HD Radio on 94.7 FM – HD2 and 105.7 FM – HD2.

WNEW-FM regularly programmed traffic reports and weather every five minutes between 5 am and 7 pm on the ones and sixes weekdays, and every ten minutes on the ones (six times an hour) the rest of the week (both from CBS local affiliate television station WUSA, Channel 9), sports updates twice an hour at :25 and :55 from sister all-sports station WJFK-FM, entertainment news once an hour, and business news from Bloomberg News twice an hour at :15 and :45. When breaking news warranted, WNEW-FM would break format to provide continuous coverage of any event. When the station began, it had traffic reports only every ten minutes, and had weather reports every four minutes.

At the beginning, it focused on Washington area news, traffic, and weather. In 2014, the station expanded its coverage of the Baltimore metropolitan area by providing news, traffic and weather reports, and coordinated with on-air personalities in the news, sports and weather departments from its long-time market-leading station WJZ-TV; the change was widely promoted and advertised at the time. This was thought to be an opportune time, since competitor WTOP had switched from its long-time wide-ranging AM signal at 1500, to several FM repeaters which curtailed its traditionally strong signal across two states and the District. WNEW-FM was now the only station to provide coverage to both Washington and Baltimore, unlike WTOP, which had, since the early 1970s, focused on the Washington area and only occasionally carried Baltimore news events, sports or the slightly different weather and temperature readings.

As with other CBS-owned all-news stations, WNEW-FM provided the audio feed of such network news programming as the daily CBS Evening News each weeknight at 7 pm, Sunday's Face the Nation interview/discussion program, and the weekly Sunday news magazine, 60 Minutes. The latter's simulcast was frequently promoted by WJZ-TV, but the radio broadcast was paused every 10 minutes for traffic and weather updates, and as a result, the WNEW-FM simulcast would be a few minutes behind the CBS television broadcast. In addition, similar to other CBS-owned all-news stations, 60 Minutes was broadcast at 7 pm on Sundays each and every week, regardless of whether or not the televised version was delayed (usually by an NFL football game) on CBS.

=== News/talk WNEW-FM ===
On February 23, 2015, WNEW-FM began airing talk programs, including the syndicated Dave Ramsey Show in the evenings, a business and personal finance call-in program and Overnight America with Jon Grayson, another syndicated nationwide late-night broadcast based at KMOX in St. Louis.

On the first weekend in March 2015, media insider local internet news website dcrtv.com reported that CBS Radio was moving the DC-area radio stations' studios and offices closer to Nationals Park, which is the home of the local baseball team, the Washington Nationals. WNEW-FM was the first station to move. On March 8, 2015, WNEW-FM said it was renovating the studios and could not continue broadcasting ordinary news programming, promising to return to regular programming later that night. This came weeks after hosts on sister station WJFK-FM had similar problems.

=== Bloomberg 99.1 ===
On December 18, 2015, at 10 am, WNEW-FM began carrying Bloomberg Radio as "Bloomberg 99.1 & 105.7-HD2" after CBS began leasing the station to Bloomberg earlier that day. WIAD-HD2 dropped the WNEW simulcast and flipped to classic hits in February 2016.

On March 15, 2016, WNEW-FM changed its call sign to WDCH-FM. The WNEW-FM call letters returned to New York City that same day.

On February 2, 2017, CBS Radio announced it would merge with Entercom. The merger was approved on November 9, 2017, and was consummated on November 17.

Bloomberg continues to lease the station via a Local marketing agreement, and extended the LMA in May 2020 (though the agreement would not be revealed publicly until December 14 of that year, by radio news website RadioInsight) through January 3, 2026. As part of the renewal agreement, Entercom (which became Audacy in 2021) also has the ability to carry Washington Capitals hockey and Virginia Tech Hokies football games that may overflow from WJFK-FM and request the ability to move other sports overflow programming if necessary in exchange for redacted credit towards the monthly LMA fee. Like the previous deal with CBS Radio, there was a clause allowing either party the ability to terminate the deal with 120 days notice starting on January 4, 2023. Effective January 1, 2026, Audacy and Bloomberg signed an additional extension through the end of 2028.

The station is unavailable through the Audacy app, deferring to carriage through Bloomberg's platforms and on the iHeartRadio app.

== See also ==
- WTOP-FM
