= Savoy (magazine) =

Magazine founded in 2001

- Categories: General interest
- Frequency: Quarterly
- Founded: 2001
- Company: Savoy Media Group
- Country: USA
- Language: English
- Website: https://savoynetwork.com

Savoy is an American national magazine aimed towards black professionals.

== History ==
Taking its name from the Savoy Ballroom of Harlem, Savoy magazine was launched by Vanguard Media in January 2001. It had been first proposed in 1995 by editor Roy Johnson who described it as "a smart, broad lifestyle publication that covers the news, personalities and trends that are important to people of color. The model we used was Vanity Fair." Savoy was aimed at Black men, between the ages of 25 and 54. A spinoff title Savoy Professional was launched in 2003.

Savoy published their final issue in January 2004 after Vanguard Media filed for bankruptcy. It had a circulation of 325,000.

Jungle Media Group purchased Savoy for $375,000. They then sold the magazine to Hermene D. Hartman, CEO of Hartman Publishing Group and owner of the free Chicago newspaper N'Digo, for $600,000.

The magazine was relaunched in February 2005 with Monroe Anderson as editor, to be published ten times each year. After four issues, the print edition was suspended and the magazine moved online. It was later sold to L.P. Green & Partners Inc who revived Savoy in 2010.
