= The Sports Junkies =

US radio program

- Genre: Talk, Sports
- Running time: Monday through Friday 6 am to 10 am
- Country of origin: United States
- Home station: WJFK-FM, NBC Sports Washington (2016-Present)
- Starring: John Martin "Cakes" Auville; Eric Carlton "EB" Bickel; Jason William "Lurch" Bishop; John-Paul "J.P." Flaim
- Produced by: Matt Cahill, Matt Myers
- Original release: 1996 – present
- Website: Website
- Podcast: Podcasts

The Sports Junkies, also known as The Junkies or The Junks, are the hosts of an eponymous morning drive time radio show aired in the Baltimore-Washington Metropolitan Area. The hosts are John Auville, Eric Bickel, Jason Bishop, and John-Paul Flaim. Their show is heard on WJFK, 106.7. Their show focuses on a mix of discussions about sports, women, popular culture, and the day-to-day lives of the Junkies.

The show has made the Talkers Magazine Heavy 100 a number of times over the years, and was ranked 8th on the 2020 Sports Talk Heavy Hundred list.

== On-air hosts ==
=== John Martin "Cakes" Auville ===
Known as "Cakes", Auville, (has also been credited as Martin Auville, and J.A. from Olney) was born in 1970. He was raised in Bowie, Maryland alongside fellow Junkies Eric Bickel and John-Paul Flaim, and attended Eleanor Roosevelt High School in Greenbelt, Maryland. After high school, Auville studied communications at Towson University in Towson, Maryland, about which he is occasionally ridiculed for achieving a 1.5 grade point average (GPA) one semester; he then managed a local Toys Я Us store until making radio his full-time occupation in 1996. Auville's family currently lives in Olney, Maryland. He married his wife, Amy, in 1995. They have three children, Kurt Joseph (1997), Juliet (2002), and Brendan Craig (2004). After the birth of their third child, Auville had a vasectomy and has since been mocked with the name "Johnny Blanks". Auville is the most successful poker player among the group with multiple cashes in the annual JPO and a surprise 15th-place finish in the PPC Aruba World Championship.

=== Eric Carlton "E.B." Bickel ===
Bickel was born in 1970 and grew up in Bowie, Maryland where he grew up across the street from fellow Junkie John-Paul Flaim and in the same neighborhood as John Auville. Bickel attended DeMatha Catholic High School in Hyattsville, Maryland, where he befriended soon-to-be-Junkie Jason Bishop. After high school, Bickel attended the University of Maryland, where he majored in psychology and got a Masters of Education. He worked as a study hall monitor for the athletic department while working on his masters and was a college counselor at Howard Community College before becoming a "Junkie" in 1997. Bickel married his wife, Dina, in 1996 and they have three children, Stephen, Megan and Kate . On February 24, 2021, he announced he will be taking a side job as the color commentator for the Marist Red Foxes lacrosse team.

=== Jason William "Bish" Bishop ===
Nicknamed "Lurch" because of his 6'6" height (a reference to The Addams Family butler on the television show), Bishop grew up in Lanham, Maryland and befriended fellow Junkie Eric Bickel while attending DeMatha Catholic High School in Hyattsville, Maryland, where he played basketball for legendary coach Morgan Wootten. Bishop received a scholarship to play basketball at the University of Richmond, then eventually transferred to Salisbury State University to pursue a degree in communications. He currently lives in Ashburn, Virginia, with his wife, Theresa, and their two daughters Madden and Ava.

=== John-Paul "J.P." Flaim ===
"J.P." Flaim was born in 1970 and grew up across the street from fellow Junkie Eric Bickel in Bowie, Maryland. Flaim attended Eleanor Roosevelt High School in Greenbelt, Maryland, and then went on to major in international business at the University of Maryland, College Park before studying law at the Temple University Beasley School of Law in Philadelphia, Pennsylvania. In 1997, he failed the Maryland bar exam, reading his results publicly while on the air; however, he passed the exam the following year and can now legally practice law in Maryland.

Flaim has also fought as a professional middleweight boxer. His record is 0–1, having lost his December 9, 2006 debut fight to Jay Watts by TKO in the first round, just days after the death of Flaim's father-in-law. In 2007, he was ranked 991st out of the top 999 boxers in the light middleweight division.

Flaim and his ex-wife Carol, have two children together, a daughter Kelsie (2000), and a son, Dylan Carlos (2007).

On February 3, 2010, Flaim announced that he and Carol would divorce. On August 24, 2012, he married Jessica "Jess" Boughers, a professional fitness model and former Hooters girl, and a former arena football and Washington Redskins cheerleader. Flaim and Boughers have a daughter, born in 2017.

== History ==
Auville, Bickel, and Flaim grew up as friends in Bowie, Maryland. Auville and Flaim attended Eleanor Roosevelt High School; at the same time, Bickel met Bishop at DeMatha Catholic High School. Bickel and Flaim also attended the University of Maryland together. After graduating from college, the foursome and other friends hung out and often shared living quarters. In 1995, the four began their broadcasting career as a hobby with a 30-minute public-access television cable TV show in Bowie, Maryland featuring sports chat and irreverent humor.

The show focused on the interplay of the foursome, featuring guests such as Playboy models, rock notables, and local sports celebrities such as University of Maryland basketball coach Gary Williams. Their high local ratings lead to their national debut on May 18, 1999, airing on about 50 affiliates of Westwood One's radio network.

Through the show's history it occupied a night slot from 7-11 p.m. and 8-midnight from mid-2001 until early 2002. In October 2002, the show moved from WJFK to WHFS during the morning drive time slot. When WHFS changed formats from alternative rock to Spanish-language, the show returned to WJFK-FM in a lunchtime spot. In 2006, the Junkies' show returned to the morning drive, replacing The Howard Stern Show when it ended its run on terrestrial radio.

In 2013, the Junkies returned to television with "Table Manners," a half-hour show on Comcast SportsNet Washington, featuring the four friends interviewing sports personalities over dinner at The Palm restaurant in Tyson's Corners, Virginia. The program debuted for an initial eight-episode run on February 6, 2013. About a decade earlier, the Junkies had been in negotiations with ESPN to do a television show, but the project fell through. "We just felt like we had unfinished business," said Junkie Eric Bickel. "We've been doing radio for almost 17 years now. There's more you can do. It just seemed almost wasteful for us to do our show, be done at 10, and then not doing anything else the rest of the day."

On May 6, 2016, the Junkies celebrated 20 years on the air. In honor of their achievement, Washington, D.C. mayor Muriel Bowser proclaimed Sports Junkies Day in Washington during their broadcast.

Beginning on September 6, 2016, NBC Sports Washington simulcasted the show. In June 2018, the Junkies celebrated the first major championship for a Washington team in the show's history – the Capitals' 2018 Stanley Cup win – and NBCS Washington Capitals announcer Joe Beninati announced in-studio that the Junkies would be part of the parade.

== Events ==
=== Junkies Poker Open ===
The Junkies have sponsored an annual "Junkie Poker Open" event typically held at the Borgata Hotel Casino & Spa in Atlantic City, New Jersey. The Texas hold'em poker tournament has gained some notoriety as former World Series of Poker contestants (Lee Childs, among others) have participated in the events. As part of their 20th year celebrations they held a special JPO in Las Vegas at the Aria Resort and Casino. In October 2017 they held their first JPO in the Washington D.C. area, hosting it at MGM National Harbor.

Event	Location	Date	# of Players	Purse	Winner
JPO 1	Borgata Hotel Casino	November 30, 2006	300	≈$28,000	Derrick Childress
JPO 2	Borgata Hotel Casino	May ??, 2007	≈420	≈$32,000	Gary Heffner
JPO 3	Borgata Hotel Casino	November 29, 2007	365	≈$28,000	Andrew Phillips
JPO 4	Borgata Hotel Casino	May 29, 2008	310	$29,934	Al from Brooklyn + 10 Player Chop
JPO 5	Borgata Hotel Casino	November 13, 2008	535	$39,000	Scotty Baggs + Chop
JPO 6	Borgata Hotel Casino	May 21, 2009			
JPO 7	Borgata Hotel Casino	November 12, 2009	597	≈$23,000	Matt Stohlman + 7 player Chop
JPO 8	Borgata Hotel Casino	May 20, 2010		≈$25,000	"O"
JPO 9	Borgata Hotel Casino	November 11, 2010	708	$41,425	Christopher Grove
JPO 10	Borgata Hotel Casino	November 2011			
JPO 11	Borgata Hotel Casino	December 6, 2012	476	$30,678	Timothy Irish
JPO 12	Borgata Hotel Casino	December 5, 2013			
JPO 13	Borgata Hotel Casino	November 6, 2014	397		
JPO 14	Borgata Hotel Casino	November 2015			
JPO Vegas (20th Anniversary Special Event)	Aria Resort and Casino	June 4, 2016	42	≈$31,000	Bret Oliverio (former producer of the show)
JPO 16	Borgata Hotel Casino	November 10, 2016	360		
JPO 17	MGM National Harbor	October 12, 2017	656	$16,000 split + chop	Chris and Dave
JPO 18	MGM National Harbor	September 7, 2018	696		
JPO 19	MGM National Harbor	September 6, 2019	751		
JPO 20	MGM National Harbor	September 9, 2022	890		

=== Unauthorized Redskins Pre-Game Show ===
Since the 2004 season, the Junkies have hosted a two-hour pregame show prior to the kick-off of each Washington Redskins game. The show is broadcast live from a Washington area restaurant or bar and airs on WJFK-FM. The show is considered "unauthorized" because they have continued doing the program even though WJFK no longer holds the rights to broadcast the team's games.

=== Upersay Owlbay Party ===
The Junkies host a party for the NFL championship game at a Washington area restaurant or bar. The name is based on a Pig Latin version of the phrase "super bowl" due to the NFL's active pursuit of trademark issues with the Super Bowl name.

=== Junkies' Spring Break Party ===
An annual spring break themed party held at the State Theater in Falls Church, Virginia. This event is no longer held.

=== Sundress Sillies Party ===
First held in 2008, the Junkies host an annual end-of-summer party. Women are encouraged to attend wearing a sundress. They also promote a "V.I.P. section" for women who do not wear underwear, but do not actively check to verify "V.I.P." eligibility.

As of 2011 the Junkies were forced to change the name of the party to "Summer Dress Party" due to trademark issues.

== Filmography ==
The Junkies had cameos in Season 2, Episode 8 of The Wire, in which their show is visited (though only Flaim is shown) and also in The D-Train, in which the four of them play Pittsburgh sports radio hosts. The Junkies also released audio of them reading their lines in their Washington studio ahead of the film's release.

== Notable Interviews ==
=== Justin Gimelstob ===
An interview with tennis player Justin Gimelstob made international headlines because of comments Gimelstob made about Anna Kournikova and other female tennis players. Gimelstob was reprimanded by his employer, Tennis Channel, and made a donation to the Women's Sports Foundation as a result of the incident.

=== Rob Ford ===
The Junkies created an international controversy on December 5, 2013, when they interviewed Rob Ford, the mayor of Toronto, Ontario, Canada. At the time of the interview, Ford was embroiled in a scandal resulting from his admitted use of drugs and alcohol. The interview was conducted while the Junkies were hosting their periodic gambling tournament at The Borgata. Producers Matt Cahill and Matt Myers arranged for the interview by appealing to Ford's interest in the National Football League and most of the interview focused on Ford's predictions for that weekend's upcoming NFL games. During the course of the interview, Bishop asked Ford to confirm the latest press accusations that he had tried to buy the incriminating video that allegedly showed him smoking crack cocaine. Ford denied the accusation and shifted the interview back to the topic of football.

Canadian media closely followed the interview especially since Ford had yet to respond to their questions about trying to purchase the incriminating video. At the end of the interview, Ford invited the Junkies to host the show in his Toronto office and also agreed to come on the show periodically to discuss football. Within hours, major American media outlets, including CNN and NBC, featured news stories about the interview.
