= Johnny Walker (DJ) =

American radio disc jockey (1948–2004)

- Born: James Lewis Embrey; August 13, 1948; New Albany, Indiana
- Died: March 1, 2004 (aged 55); Baltimore, Maryland
- Occupation: Disc jockey

Johnny Walker (born as James Lewis Embrey in New Albany, Indiana; August 13, 1948 – March 1, 2004) was an American radio personality, best known as a disc jockey on WFBR, a Baltimore, Maryland AM radio station from 1974 to 1987.

His radio name was taken from Johnnie Walker, a brand of whiskey, which supported his persona which has been described as "madcap" or "shock jock", which on occasion drew the ire of the Federal Communications Commission. For most of those years, his show was the top rated in the morning drive-time. For a time he owned a self-named club that was promoted on the radio station. He also briefly worked at WFBR with Robin Quivers. His first radio job was at WLRS-FM in Louisville at the recommendation of future radio personality and consultant Steve Warren, his school classmate at New Albany High School.

He helped Ira Glass, host of This American Life, get his radio start as his joke-writer while Glass was in high school. While in high school, himself, Embrey was a standout local magician.

Walker's early career included on-air positions at AM radio stations WMAK (1300 kHz) in Nashville and WDXB (1490 kHz) in Chattanooga, Tennessee. He had previously worked at WPTR in Albany, New York under the pseudonym "Wild Child".

He died in 2004 due to complications associated with lung cancer.
