= WLZL =

Spanish-language contemporary hit radio station in College Park, Maryland

- College Park, Maryland; United States
- Broadcast area: Baltimore–Washington metropolitan area
- Frequency: 107.9 MHz (HD Radio)
- Branding: El Zol 107.9 FM

Programming
- Language: Spanish
- Format: Contemporary hit radio
- Subchannels: HD2: Caribbean music "Roadblock Radio"

Ownership
- Owner: Audacy, Inc.; (Audacy License, LLC)
- Sister stations: WDCH-FM; WIAD; WJFK; WJFK-FM; WPGC-FM; WTEM

History
- First air date: May 16, 1960
- Former call signs: WANN-FM (1960); WXTC (1960–1972); WFSI (1972–2011); WBGR (2011)
- Call sign meaning: "El Zol"

Technical information
- Licensing authority: FCC
- Facility ID: 20983
- Class: B
- ERP: 49,000 watts (analog); 2,400 watts; (digital)
- HAAT: 151.1 meters (496 ft)
- Transmitter coordinates: 38°59′46″N 76°39′23.9″W

Links
- Public license information: Public file; LMS
- Webcast: Listen live (via Audacy); Listen live (via iHeartRadio); HD2: Listen live
- Website: www.audacy.com/elzolradio; HD2: www.roadblockradio.com

WLZL (107.9 MHz, "El Zol 107.9 FM") is a commercial radio station licensed to serve College Park, Maryland, owned by Audacy, Inc. It broadcasts a Latin pop radio format, from studios located in Washington, D.C. while the station's broadcast tower is located east of Crofton, Maryland.

WLZL broadcasts using HD Radio.

== History ==
The station signed on for the first time on May 16, 1960, as WANN-FM in Annapolis, Maryland. WANN-FM was the FM sister station to AM daytimer WANN (1190 AM). The call sign was changed to WXTC on September 26, 1960. In 1971, Morris H. Blum sold WXTC to Family Stations Inc., operator of the Family Radio network, for $350,000; Blum retained WANN. Family changed the call sign to WFSI on January 31, 1972; as with the other Family Radio stations, it aired a Christian radio format.

On November 16, 2011, CBS Radio announced plans to acquire WFSI from Family Radio, with the intention of moving WLZL's Spanish tropical format and El Zol branding from 99.1 to 107.9, with a new all-news format to be launched on 99.1. The format change occurred on December 1, when both stations began simulcasting El Zol programming. WFSI also swapped call signs with WBGR, a Family Radio-owned AM station in Baltimore, the same day. The 99.1/107.9 simulcast ended on December 12, with the WLZL call sign moving from 99.1 to 107.9 and the new WNEW-FM call sign debuting on 99.1.

On February 19, 2013, the Federal Communications Commission (FCC) granted CBS Radio a construction permit for WLZL to lower its ERP from 50,000 watts to 49,000 watts and to lower its HAAT from 152 meters (499 ft) to 151.1 meters (496 ft). These changes brought WLZL into compliance with current FCC rules regarding maximum ERP and HAAT for a Class B station. WLZL had been operating using facilities that exceeded these parameters as a "grandfathered" facility. On May 7, 2014, the FCC granted a request by CBS Radio to change the community of license for the station from Annapolis to College Park, Maryland, as a modification of the construction permit. The reason given was to provide College Park with its first local transmission service.

On February 2, 2017, CBS Radio announced it would merge with Entercom. The merger was approved on November 9, and was consummated on November 17.
