= WJFK (AM) =

- Morningside, Maryland; United States
- Broadcast area: Washington metropolitan area
- Frequency: 1580 kHz
- Branding: The Bet Washington

Programming
- Language: English
- Format: Sports gambling
- Affiliations: BetMGM Network; Westwood One Sports

Ownership
- Owner: Audacy, Inc.; (Audacy License, LLC)
- Sister stations: WDCH-FM; WIAD; WJFK-FM; WLZL; WPGC-FM; WTEM

History
- First air date: April 1954
- Former call signs: WPGC (1954–2008); WHFS (2008–2011); WNEW (2011–2013)
- Call sign meaning: John Fitzgerald Kennedy

Technical information
- Licensing authority: FCC
- Facility ID: 28638
- Class: B
- Power: 50,000 watts (day); 270 watts (night)
- Transmitter coordinates: 38°52′9.4″N 76°53′45.9″W
- Repeater: 106.7 WJFK-FM-HD3 (Manassas)

Links
- Public license information: Public file; LMS
- Webcast: Listen live (via Audacy)
- Website: audacy.com/thebetwashington

WJFK (1580 AM) is a commercial radio station broadcasting a sports gambling format. Licensed to Morningside, Maryland, and serving the Washington metropolitan area, the station is owned by Audacy, Inc. The studios are in Southeast DC in the Navy Yard neighborhood. Programming is supplied by the co-owned BetMGM Network and Westwood One Sports.

WJFK’s transmitter is sited on Addison Road South (Maryland Route 458) near Walker Mill Road in Capitol Heights, Maryland.

== History ==
=== Early years ===
On November 12, 1953, former Federal Communications Commission (FCC) employee Harry Hayman received a construction permit for a radio station in Morningside transmitting with 250 watts daytime-only on 1580 kilohertz. The call sign WPGC, representing Prince George's County, was issued soon afterwards.

In April 1954, WPGC signed on as a multi-formatted radio station. Maxwell Evans Richmond purchased one half interest in the station from Harry Hayman for $10,000 on November 10, 1954.

On April 14, 1955, WPGC was issued a permit to raise power to 10,000 watts. It also moved its offices from Morningside to a facility in Hyattsville, Maryland. It later moved to Southeast, Washington, D.C., in studios formerly used by WBUZ (95.5). In 1959, the station started simulcasting its programming on 95.5 during the daytime, by then renamed WRNC. That FM station is now WPGC-FM, which it became after WPGC bought 95.5 outright.

=== Top 40/business talk ===
On June 28, 1965, the WPGC-AM-FM were granted a modification of their licenses to move their studios to Bladensburg while continuing to identify their city of license as Morningside. By then, the station played Top 40 hits with a format similar to WABC and WMCA in New York City and CKLW in Detroit. WPGC-AM-FM became the most popular Top 40 station in the Washington area, rivaled only by WEAM (1390; now WZHF). Responding to the black population growth of the Washington area, WPGC began to alternate playing so-called "white" rock records with Motown and soul music hits.

After Max Richmond died in 1971, his estate received FCC approval on August 7, 1974, to sell the WPGC stations for $5.8 million to First Media Corporation. The transaction was finalized on October 17, 1974.

On April 9, 1979, the FCC granted WPGC a permit to raise power from 10,000 watts to 50,000 watts using a directional antenna.

After 15 years in the Parkway Building in Bladensburg, the station moved to new state-of-the-art studios overlooking the Capital Beltway in Greenbelt in 1980; the station subsequently relocated to studios in Lanham.

WPGC was finally granted nighttime operation in October 1986, operating with 270 watts. First Media sold all of its radio stations for $177 million to Cook Inlet Radio Partners, a group of Alaska Natives, in early 1987.

The station switched to a business talk format on October 1, 1988. In 1989, its night power was upgraded to 500 watts directional; the next year, it reverted to 270 watts, though still directional.

=== CBS Radio ===
Infinity Broadcasting (later merged into CBS Radio) acquired WPGC-AM-FM from Cook Inlet in June 1994 for $60 million. On January 13, 1995, the station returned to music programming as "Flava 1580", with an all hip-hop music/go-go format. The format was unsuccessful, and ultimately evolved to urban gospel in November 1996 as "Heaven 1580".

WPGC dropped the gospel format on October 7, 2008, and began simulcasting WPGC-FM's rhythmic contemporary sound. The simulcast ended on November 10, 2008, when 1580 AM switched to a talk radio format. The station also dropped the WPGC callsign after 54 years, taking on the WHFS call sign that CBS had dropped from what is now WJZ-FM in Baltimore a week before.

On December 1, 2011, WHFS changed callsigns to WNEW. This came near-simultaneously with the change of 99.1 FM to WNEW-FM.

On October 1, 2012, WNEW AM changed its format to a hybrid government news/business news format, branded as "1580 Gov. Biz Radio". This format was dropped on January 28, 2013, when the station joined CBS Sports Radio as a full-time network affiliate. The station subsequently changed the call sign on January 29 to WJFK, matching call signs with sister station WJFK-FM "106.7 The Fan."

CBS launched an online portal called "Connecting Vets" in June 2017, consisting of news and podcasts oriented toward military veterans. Podcast content was combined with live drive-time news coverage into an Internet stream that also began airing on WJFK on June 5, 2017.

=== Entercom/Audacy ownership ===
On February 2, 2017, CBS Radio announced it would merge with Entercom. The merger was approved on November 9, 2017, and was consummated on November 17. (In March 2021, Entercom changed its name to Audacy, Inc.)

Despite the move to a talk format, WJFK continued some local sports coverage as an overflow partner for WJFK-FM. The station was nominally an affiliate of the Washington Nationals Radio Network, although coverage was limited to spring training games since WJFK-FM became the team's flagship. WJFK also carried D.C. United, Virginia Tech Hokies men's basketball, and Georgetown Hoyas men's basketball games, which often conflict with WJFK-FM's coverage of the Nationals, Washington Capitals, and Washington Wizards.

On April 9, 2018, WJFK flipped to a Spanish-language sports talk format as "El Zol Deportes", assuming the branding of its sister station WLZL (107.9 FM) and shifting its HD simulcast to WLZL-HD2. The station became an affiliate of ESPN Deportes Radio along with a local show from 3-5p.m. hosted by Ray Parker. After ESPN Deportes Radio was discontinued on September 8, 2019, the station became an affiliate of TUDN Radio.

On June 21, 2021, WJFK returned to English-language sports programming and flipped to a sports gambling, branded as "The Bet Washington", with programming from the co-owned BetQL Network and CBS Sports Radio. With the flip, WJFK shifted its HD simulcast to WJFK-FM-HD3.
