= BetMGM Network =

American sports betting radio network

- Type: Sports betting radio network
- Country: United States

Ownership
- Owner: Audacy, Inc.
- Parent: Audacy, Inc. (producer); Westwood One (distributor)

History
- Launch date: January 25, 2021 (Full programming)
- Former names: BetQL Network (2021-2025)

Links
- Webcast: Listen live (via Audacy)
- Website: www.audacy.com/betting

The BetMGM Network (known on air as The Bet) is a radio network owned and operated by Audacy, Inc. that focuses on the world of sports betting. It is heard on the Audacy app as well as Audacy's portfolio of sports stations. The network was launched as the BetQL Network on January 25, 2021, after Entercom (the forerunner of Audacy) purchased the QL Gaming Group in November 2020.

On February 2, 2025, the network was relaunched as BetMGM Network as part of Audacy's ongoing partnership with sportsbook company BetMGM.

== Affiliates ==
=== Current ===
All stations in bold lettering are owned by Audacy, Inc.

- BetMGM Studio – Calgary, Alberts
- KAMP – Aurora–Denver, Colorado
- WJZ – Baltimore, Maryland
- WEEI – Boston, Massachusetts
- WGR – Buffalo, New York
- WKSE HD4 – Buffalo, New York
- WWKB – Buffalo, New York
- WSCR – Chicago, IL
- WCFS-FM HD2 – Elmwood Park–Chicago, IL
- KNSS-FM HD3 – Clearwater–Wichita, Kansas
- KCSF – Colorado Springs, Colorado
- WBNS-FM HD3 - Columbus, Ohio
- KJKK HD3 – Dallas, Texas
- WXYT – Detroit, Michigan
- WJRW – Grand Rapids, Michigan
- WYRD – Greenville, South Carolina
- KIKK – Houston, Texas
- KWOD – Kansas City, Kansas
- KLUC-FM HD2 – Las Vegas, Nevada
- KCBS-FM HD3 – Los Angeles, California
- WMC – Memphis, Tennessee
- WQAM / WQAM-FM – Miami, Florida
- WSSP – Milwaukee, Wisconsin
- WWWL – New Orleans, Louisiana
- WJHM HD2 – Orlando, Florida
- WPRV – Providence, Rhode Island
- WRNL – Richmond, Virginia
- WROC – Rochester, New York
- WJFK – Morningside, Maryland–Washington D.C.

=== Former ===
- KGO – San Francisco, California (Currently airs a conservative talk radio format previously broadcast by KSFO)
- KXST – North Las Vegas, Nevada (license returned to the FCC on March 22, 2024)
- WAXY – South Miami, Florida (Currently airs Spanish-language adult contemporary and conservative talk programming)
- WFAS – White Plains, New York (license returned to the FCC on October 7, 2024)
