= WJZ-FM =

- Catonsville, Maryland; United States
- Broadcast area: Baltimore metropolitan area
- Frequency: 105.7 MHz (HD Radio)
- Branding: 105.7 The Fan

Programming
- Language: English
- Format: Sports radio
- Subchannels: HD2: Business news (WDCH-FM); HD3: Sports gambling (WJZ)
- Affiliations: Westwood One Sports; Westwood One

Ownership
- Owner: Audacy, Inc.; (Audacy License, LLC)
- Sister stations: WDCH-FM; WJZ; WLIF; WWMX

History
- First air date: November 22, 1963
- Former call signs: WCBC (1963–1968); WBMD-FM (1968–1971); WKTK (1971–1982); WQSR (1982–2001); WXYV (2001–2005); WHFS (2005–2008)
- Call sign meaning: Taken from former sister station WJZ-TV

Technical information
- Licensing authority: FCC
- Facility ID: 1916
- Class: B
- ERP: 50,000 watts (analog); 2,390 watts (digital)
- HAAT: 150 meters (490 ft)
- Transmitter coordinates: 39°19′26.4″N 76°32′54.9″W
- Translator: HD3: 104.9 W285EJ (White Marsh)

Links
- Public license information: Public file; LMS
- Webcast: Listen live (via Audacy); Listen live (via iHeartRadio)
- Website: www.audacy.com/1057thefan

WJZ-FM (105.7 MHz) is a commercial radio station licensed to Catonsville, Maryland, and serving the Baltimore metropolitan area. The station is owned by Audacy, Inc. through licensee Audacy License, LLC, and it broadcasts a sports radio format. Local shows are heard on weekdays, with programming from Westwood One Sports airing nights and weekends. The station's studios and offices are located in Towson.

WJZ-FM has an effective radiated power (ERP) of 50,000 watts. The transmitter is located off Moravia Road in Baltimore's Frankford neighborhood at (39°19′26.4″N 76°32′54.8″W). WJZ-FM broadcasts using HD Radio technology. The HD2 digital subchannel carries the Bloomberg Radio business news format heard on WDCH-FM, while the HD3 subchannel rebroadcasts co-owned WJZ (1300 AM), which primarily carries BetMGM Network programming.

== History ==
=== History of the WJZ-FM call sign ===
The call letters WJZ-FM were originally used on what is now WPLJ in New York City from its founding in 1948 to 1953 when the station became WABC-FM, alongside WABC-TV and WABC (AM).

The call letters "WJZ" were originally created by the Westinghouse Electric Corporation, a predecessor to the current Paramount Global. Westinghouse was the owner of WJZ radio in Newark, New Jersey, from 1921 to 1923, before it moved to New York. Apocryphal stories claimed the "JZ" in the call sign referred to New Jersey, but call letters in 1921 were assigned by the Department of Commerce, often in sequential alphabetical order, and few of them stood for anything. Often, years later, owners retroactively created a slogan to fit their call letters. Meanwhile, the WJZ call letters have been used in Baltimore since 1957, when WAAM (channel 13) was renamed to WJZ-TV, an ABC Network affiliate that was changed to CBS in 1995.

=== WCBC, WBMD-FM, WKTK, WQSR ===
The station signed on the air on November 22, 1963. The original call letters were WCBC, owned by Christian Broadcasting Company and it aired a Christian radio format.

The station was purchased on March 6, 1968, by Key Broadcasting, which continued the Christian radio format, changing its call sign to WBMD-FM in late 1969. The new call sign referred to Baltimore, Maryland. The FM station simulcast a country music AM station, WBMD, already owned by Key.

In 1970, the FM's format became progressive rock at night, with country during the day. On July 5, 1971, the station's call sign was changed to WKTK and the format shifted to all progressive rock music. From 1977 to 1979, WKTK played disco music. It later changed to oldies with the decline of disco. In 1982, the call letters became WQSR as the station planned to join "Super Radio", a new national adult contemporary music network to be operated by ABC, using noted disc jockeys such as Dan Ingram, Ron Lundy and Jay Thomas. Shortly before Super Radio's scheduled launch, ABC decided not to go forward with the network. WQSR kept its new call letters but aired local programming.

WQSR was then sold to Sconnix Broadcasting in 1988 and continued playing oldies music. The station, along with WBMD, was sold to American Radio Systems (ARS) for $39 million in 1994; ARS would merge with CBS Radio in 1998.

=== WXYV ===
On September 8, 2001, at 6 a.m., WQSR moved to WXYV's 102.7 FM frequency to broadcast on a better signal. After two days of simulcasting, at 3 p.m. on September 10, 105.7 FM became the new home for WXYV, and flipped to urban contemporary format, branded as "X105.7". (X105.7 marked WXYV's second stint as an urban station; the first incarnation was known as "V103", which flipped to contemporary hit radio and became "102.7XYV" in 1997, and was then re-branded as "B102.7" in 1998, with the same CHR/Top-40 format). The call letter swap between the two stations became official four days later.

Both stations were owned by Infinity Broadcasting (forerunner to CBS Radio). The morning show was a simulcast of former V103 and 92Q personality Frank Ski's wake up program, originating from WVEE, "V103" in Atlanta.

=== Revival of WHFS ===
"X105.7" would fail to compete for urban listeners against WERQ-FM; as a result, CBS Radio flipped WXYV to hot talk on March 10, 2003. The station carried the nationally syndicated Howard Stern Show and the Don and Mike Show. The station adopted the name "Live 105.7", which would later change to "105.7 Free FM" in 2006, and then "Baltimore's FM Talk 105.7" in 2007 after CBS phased out the Free FM branding nationwide.

This logo was used during WHFS's talk radio incarnation.

Meanwhile, Infinity Broadcasting saw an unexpected public reaction to the company's decision to change the format of 99.1 FM, located halfway between Washington and Baltimore. The story was covered by local TV stations for many days afterwards, and mentioned nationally by The Washington Post, Howard Stern and The Today Show. The corporate offices of Infinity Broadcasting in New York City were flooded with phone calls and e-mails from irate listeners.

An online petition protesting the format change gathered tens of thousands of signatures in only a few days. Media attention was attracted by a public protest in downtown Washington, outside a skate shop where WHFS maintained a remote storefront studio in its last few months. WHFS' main competitor, DC101, paid tribute to the station, airing many memories of WHFS from its DJs and listeners.

Infinity Broadcasting responded by resurrecting the WHFS format on nights and weekends at 105.7, beginning at 7 p.m. on January 21, 2005, with former WHFS afternoon DJ Tim Virgin. The station rebranded itself as "The Legendary HFS, Live on 105.7"; Infinity Broadcasting moved the WHFS call letters to the station days later. 'HFS was pulled from the airwaves again on February 1, 2007, immediately before KMS on HFS premiered, yet retained the WHFS call letters traditionally associated with the music the station used to broadcast. Currently, HFS2 and Locals Only with Neci remain WHFS's only ties to its original format.

=== HFS2 ===
In 2006, WHFS began to broadcast a digital subchannel signal for radios using the new HD Radio technology, and launched an all-music station named "HFS2". The station focuses primarily on new alternative rock and indie rock, and currently has no DJs or commercials. On January 19, 2007, the online stream of "HFS2" was launched with the slogan "What You've Been Missing" hinting at the death of HFS music on the regular 105.7 frequency.

On Thursday, November 1, 2007, Neci Crowder began broadcasting a midday program on HFS2. This marked the first time a live DJ had been heard on HFS2.

=== 105.7 the Fan ===
On November 3, 2008, WHFS flipped to all-sports, branded as "105.7 The Fan". Along with the format change came a new call sign: WJZ-FM. The station put Ed Norris and Rob Long in morning drive time with "The Norris & Long Show". Mark Viviano and Damon "Bulldog" Yoffe had a late morning program, and Bruce Cunningham and Mark Zinno hosted in early afternoons. Scott Garceau and Anita Marks were named to host "The Scott Garceau Show" in afternoon drive.

WJZ-FM retained WHFS' status as the flagship station for Baltimore Orioles baseball and Maryland Terrapins football and men's basketball. The WHFS call sign landed on 1580 AM (formerly WPGC) one week later. Orioles broadcasts moved from WJZ-FM back to WBAL (which WHFS had replaced as flagship in 2007) in 2011. In 2015, WJZ-FM reacquired the broadcast rights to Orioles games from WBAL for the second time.

=== Entercom ownership ===
On February 2, 2017, CBS agreed to merge CBS Radio with Entercom, at the time the fourth-largest radio broadcaster in the United States; the sale was conducted using a Reverse Morris Trust so that it would be tax-free. While CBS shareholders retained a 72% ownership stake in the combined company, Entercom was surviving entity, separating WJZ radio (both 105.7 FM and AM 1300) from WJZ-TV. The merger was approved on November 9, 2017, and was consummated on the 17th.

Despite no longer sharing common ownership with WJZ-TV, the deal grants the station the right to use the call letters in perpetuity.

== Short-spaced signal ==
WJZ-FM is short-spaced to WQXA-FM 105.7 The X (licensed to serve York, Pennsylvania) as they operate on the same channel and the distance between the stations' transmitters is 47 miles (76 km) as determined by FCC rules. The minimum distance between two Class B stations operating on the same channel according to current FCC rules is 150 miles (240 km). Both stations use directional antennas to reduce their signals toward each other.

== See also ==
- List of three-letter broadcast call signs in the United States
