= WWMX =

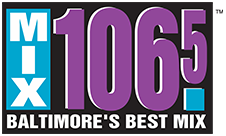
- Baltimore, Maryland; United States
- Broadcast area: Baltimore metropolitan area
- Frequency: 106.5 MHz (HD Radio)
- Branding: MIX 106-5

Programming
- Language: English
- Format: Hot adult contemporary
- Subchannels: HD2: Channel Q
- Affiliations: Compass Media Networks; Westwood One

Ownership
- Owner: Audacy, Inc.; (Audacy License, LLC)
- Sister stations: WDCH-FM; WJZ; WJZ-FM; WLIF

History
- First air date: June 30, 1960
- Former call signs: WCBM-FM (1960–1968); WMAR-FM (1968–1982); WRLX (1982–1983); WMAR-FM (1983–1985); WMKR-FM (1985–1986)
- Call sign meaning: "Mix"

Technical information
- Licensing authority: FCC
- Facility ID: 74196
- Class: B
- ERP: 10,500 watts
- HAAT: 296 meters (971 ft)
- Transmitter coordinates: 39°20′5″N 76°39′2″W

Links
- Public license information: Public file; LMS
- Webcast: Listen live (via Audacy); Listen live (via iHeartRadio)
- Website: www.audacy.com/mix1065baltimore

WWMX (106.5 MHz), known on-air as Mix 106-5, is a commercial FM radio station in Baltimore, Maryland. It broadcasts a hot adult contemporary radio format and is owned by Audacy, Inc. The studios and offices are on Clarkview Road off Jones Falls Expressway.

WWMX has an effective radiated power (ERP) of 10,500 watts. The station's transmitter is located on Television Hill in Baltimore. WWMX broadcasts using HD Radio technology; the HD2 digital subchannel carries Audacy's Channel Q, aimed at the LGBTQ community.

== History ==
The station signed on June 30, 1960, as WCBM-FM, a sister station to WCBM (680 AM). In 1968, Metromedia, which had bought the WCBM stations in 1964, sold WCBM-FM to The A.S. Abell Company, owner of WMAR-TV and the Sunpapers, for $200,000; the sale was necessary because Metromedia's purchase of WASH in Washington put the company over the Federal Communications Commission (FCC)'s ownership limits of the time, which limited a company to owning seven FM radio stations. Abell changed the call sign to WMAR-FM; this was the second incarnation of WMAR-FM, as an earlier station with those call sign was operated by Abell on 97.9 FM (unrelated to the later WIYY) from 1948 to 1950. The call sign were changed to WRLX in 1982. For many years, the station had played beautiful music. By the early 1980s, the target demographic of the station had aged beyond what was termed "profitable" and the station decided to switch to a new format.

The WMAR-FM call sign returned on July 14, 1983; at 10:30 p.m. on July 28, it became one of many "Hot Hits" CHR/Top 40 stations throughout the country, consulted by programmer Mike Joseph. WMAR-FM, also known as "Hot Hits 106", was the main competitor to Baltimore's other CHR, B104. When the station was sold to S&F Broadcasting in 1985, it retained the Hot Hits format, but its call sign changed to WMKR-FM on March 15, 1985, and its name became "Hot Hits K-106". The station was sold once again to Capitol Broadcasting in 1986. Capitol decided to change the format to adult contemporary and the name to "Mix 106.5" that October 24. "K-106" signed off by playing "Broken Wings" by Mr. Mister, and then the jingles for each of its DJs. "Mix" was then introduced, and the call sign was changed to WWMX. Initially, WWMX played the "Best Mix of the '60s, '70s, and '80s." For years, many (including the local press at times) mistakenly thought the calls were "WMIX", leading the station to insert quick "W-Mix", with the word "Mix" spoken, liners between commercials. These were not legal station identifications, as 106.5 still identified itself as "WWMX Baltimore" at the top of the hour, but they allowed the station to claim listeners who mistakenly identified 106.5 as "WMIX" in their diaries. The "WMIX" callsign is actually used for AM and FM stations in Mount Vernon, Illinois, whose broadcaster, Withers Broadcasting, registered the "WMIX" branding as a registered trademark. Shortly after the trademark was approved, WWMX dropped the "W-Mix" liners.

In 1990, the station's adult contemporary format evolved into a hot adult contemporary format, playing some hip hop and classic hard rock. Many urban contemporary songs that have charted high on the CHR/pop charts have been played on WWMX.

Capitol Broadcasting sold the station to American Radio Systems in 1996, who later merged with Infinity Broadcasting in 1997. Infinity changed names in 2005 to CBS Radio.

In 2008, the station began shifting towards a mainstream Top 40 (CHR) direction (similar to rival WIHT in Washington, D.C.) as it began incorporating more rhythmic hits, but still incorporated 1990s hits played on hot AC stations, thus classified as an Adult Top 40 station. As of April 2009, the station has dramatically shifted away from hot AC, primarily focusing on top 40 hits much like a CHR station, but still plays some music from the mid to late 2000s, and dropped the remaining '80s and '90s songs (most of those songs would move to the station's HD3 sub-channel, which was branded as "The Point"; the format would later be replaced by "Channel Q"). WWMX had not had much rivalry in the market until CHR station WZFT replaced alternative rock station WCHH in 2009. In July 2015, Mediabase moved the station from the Hot AC panel to their Top 40 panel. In September 2020, Mediabase moved WWMX back to their Hot AC panel.

On February 2, 2017, CBS Radio announced it would merge with Entercom. The merger was approved on November 9, 2017, and was consummated on November 17. The company rebranded as Audacy in 2021.

=== WWMX-HD2 ===
In 2006, WWMX's HD2 subchannel was launched with a Top 40 "New CHR" format. It was replaced in January 2010 with a rhythmic dance format billed as "MIX2", playing a mix of hit-driven rhythmic dance, hip-hop and pop tracks and remixes. On August 1, 2011, it was replaced with a modern rock format branded as "HFS @ 97-5" (simulcast on translator W248AO 97.5 FM). As per an agreement with the translator's owner, Hope Christian Church of Marlton, the format was moved to another translator, W285EJ (104.9 FM) as "HFS @104.9", on April 2, 2014, at 6 pm; the church's "Hope FM" programming would move to W248AO, in return. The "HFS" programming would be dropped on August 1, 2021, as W285EJ began simulcasting sister station WJZ. The subchannel switched to a new alternative rock releases format as "New Arrivals" channel, which was also heard on New York City sister station WNYL-HD2, and subchannels of other alternative rock radio stations owned by Audacy. In January 2024, WWMX-HD2 would switch to Channel Q, which is aimed for LGBT audiences, and was previously carried on the station's HD3 subchannel.
