= WESP (FM) =

Radio station in Jupiter, Florida

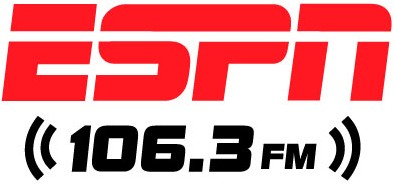
- Jupiter, Florida; United States
- Broadcast area: Palm Beach County; Treasure Coast
- Frequency: 106.3 MHz
- RDS: ESPN1063
- Branding: ESPN 106.3

Programming
- Language: English
- Format: Sports radio
- Affiliations: ESPN Radio; Miami Dolphins; Miami Heat; Buffalo Bills Radio Network

Ownership
- Owner: Good Karma Brands; (Good Karma Broadcasting, LLC)
- Sister stations: WEFL

History
- First air date: 1994
- Former call signs: WADY (1993–1994, CP); WJBW (1994–1997); WJBW-FM (1997–2007); WNEW-FM (2007–2011); WHFS (2011–2012); WUUB (2012–2025)
- Call sign meaning: Double entendre of its metro area of West Palm Beach and network affiliation

Technical information
- Licensing authority: FCC
- Facility ID: 24143
- Class: C3
- ERP: 19,000 watts
- HAAT: 114 meters (374 ft)
- Transmitter coordinates: 26°47′59.00″N 80°4′33.00″W

Links
- Public license information: Public file; LMS
- Webcast: Listen live
- Website: www.espnwestpalm.com

WESP (106.3 FM) is a radio station licensed to Jupiter, Florida. It airs a sports radio format, and is owned by Good Karma Sports, The station's studios are in West Palm Beach and the transmitter tower is in Riviera Beach.

The station is licensed to HD Radio, but is not currently broadcasting in HD.

== History ==
Prior to January 2007, 106.3 FM was known as WJBW, and between January 2007 and December 2011, it was known as WNEW-FM. Despite these call letter changes, the station's branding remained "B106.3".

CBS Radio, who at the time also owned 102.7 FM in New York that decided to drop WNEW-FM callsign and change to WWFS, "warehoused" the WNEW calls to 106.3 FM in January 2007. The WNEW callsign would returned to 102.7 FM in New York in March 2016. The WNEW call letters were formerly also used as the call letters for New York City radio stations WNEW AM (now WBBR), as well as New York City television station WNEW-TV (now WNYW).

On December 1, 2011, WNEW changed their call letters to WHFS, in effect doing the same "warehousing" move for those call letters, which were tied to long-running alternative rock stations in three different incarnations in the Baltimore and Washington, DC markets in the 1960s, 1970s, 1980s, 1990s, and early 2000s. As with the case with WNEW-FM, the station kept the "B106.3" branding under WHFS.

On April 10, 2012, CBS Radio announced that it was selling WHFS and its sister stations to Palm Beach Broadcasting for $50 million, pending FCC approval. The station's Urban Adult Contemporary format and airstaff will be retained under the new owners; however, under the terms of the deal, the WHFS call sign will remain within the ownership of CBS Radio, requiring the station to change its call letters once more. In addition, the station, as well as WAXY-FM, will be spun off to comply with Federal Communications Commission (FCC) ownership rules. The WHFS call letters were moved to former sister station WSJT on August 2, 2012, as that station launched a new sports talk format. B106.3 adopted the new WUUB call letters on the same day.

On February 26, 2013, it was widely reported in the 'trades' that Good Karma Broadcasting (now Good Karma Sports as of August 2026), owners of ESPN Radio affiliate WEFL (760 AM), in West Palm Beach, was purchasing WUUB to bring an FM outlet to the area. Under terms of an agreement between CBS and Palm Beach Broadcasting, the sale to Good Karma was allowed. The format change to sports took place on February 26, 2013, at 5 pm. The purchase by Good Karma was consummated on April 17, 2013, at a purchase price of $2.4 million.

On April 11, 2025, the station filed with the FCC to change its call letters from WUUB to WESP, and was granted the change on April 17.

== Programming ==
WUUB, a.k.a. "B106.3", formerly carried an Urban Adult Contemporary format playing R&B and soul music. It carried two syndicated shows: The Tom Joyner Morning Show and Love, Lust and Lies with Michael Baisden in the afternoons. B-106.3 also brought gospel programming on Sunday mornings and Classic Soul on Sunday afternoons. After the format switch, former sister station WMBX (X102.3) broadened its format from rhythmic to urban contemporary and added more R&B.

As an ESPN Radio affiliate, the station carries local shows hosted by Theo Dorsey, Mike Rizzo, and Colin Russo (son of Chris "Mad Dog" Russo). The station offers extensive play-by-play of local sports teams, ranging from high school football to the NFL. As part of Good Karma's assumption of responsibility for the Buffalo Bills Radio Network, Buffalo Bills games were added to the station to serve the Bills diaspora in Florida, despite being in the media market of the Bills' rivals, the Miami Dolphins.
