= List of newspapers in Maryland =

This is a list of newspapers in Maryland.

== Currently published ==
Title	Locale	Year est.	Frequency	Publisher/parent company	Notes
The Aegis	Bel Air	1856	twice-weekly	Baltimore Sun Media Group	Harford County local newspaper. Also published as The Aegis & Intelligencer, 1864-1923, The Aegis and Harford Gazette, 1951-1964, The Aegis, the Harford Gazette and the Democratic Ledger, 1964-1969.
Las Américas Newspaper	Baltimore				Spanish language newspaper
The Annapolis Times	Annapolis	1991	Weekly	Joy Bramble	Focuses on the African-American community.
Baltimore Afro-American	Baltimore	1892	Weekly		National Edition. Also published as the Afro-American Ledger, 1900-1915.
Baltimore Banner	Baltimore	1965, restarting 2022	daily	Baltimore Banner Co. (1965)	Local edition. Has expanded outside Baltimore City to cover Baltimore County and other nearby Maryland counties.
The Baltimore Business Journal	Baltimore				
Baltimore Chronicle	Baltimore	1973	Monthly	Baltimore News Network, Inc.	Also published as The City Dweller, 1973-1976. Currently only online, print issues ended in 2003.
Baltimore Jewish Times	Baltimore	1919	Weekly	Route 95 Publications LLC	In 2011 it was redesigned to become more magazine-like.
Baltimore OUTloud	Baltimore	2003	Bi-weekly	Pride Media Limited	LGBTQ newspaper
The Baltimore Sun	Baltimore	1837	daily	Baltimore Sun Media Group	
Baltimore Times	Baltimore	1986	Weekly	Joy Bramble	Covers the African-American community in Baltimore, focusing on positive stories and news.
Baltimorské Listy	Baltimore				A Czech-language newspaper. Title translates to Baltimore Letters.
Bay Times and Record-Observer	Chester		Weekly	Adams Publishing Group, Chesapeake Publishing	Formed from a merging of The Kent Island Bay Times and the Record-Observer.
The Beacon Newspapers	Kensington	1989	Monthly		Publishes three monthly newspapers: Greater Baltimore, DC/Suburban Maryland, & Northern Virginia
The Calvert Recorder	Calvert County	1971		Adams Publishing Group, Chesapeake Publishing	
The Capital	Annapolis	1884	Daily	Baltimore Sun Media Group	Also published as Evening Capital, 1884-1981 and Evening Capital and Maryland Gazette, 1910-1922.
Carroll County Times	Westminster	1911	Daily	Baltimore Sun Media Group	Also published as The Times, 1911-1956.
Cecil Whig	Elkton	1841	Daily	Adams Publishing Group, Chesapeake Publishing	
The Charles County Times-Crescent	La Plata	1893	Weekly	Free State Communications, Inc.	Also published as The Crescent, 1893-1898, The Times Crescent, 1898-1966, The Times-Crescent The Charles County Leaf, 1966-1971, Times-Crescent, 1971-1989.
Cumberland Times-News	Cumberland		Daily	Community Newspaper Holdings, Inc.	
The Daily Record	Baltimore	1888	Daily	Bridgetower Media	
Daily Times	Salisbury	1886	Daily	USA Today Co.	Also published as The Wicomico News, 1886-1923, The Salisbury Times, 1923-1967, and The Shoreman's Daily.
Dorchester Star	Easton	1973		Adams Publishing Group, Chesapeake Publishing	
The Dundalk Eagle	Dundalk	1969		Adams Publishing Group, Chesapeake Publishing	
Enquirer-Gazette	Upper Marlboro	1851	Weekly	Adams Publishing Group, Chesapeake Publishing	
The Enterprise	St. Mary's County	1883		Adams Publishing Group, Chesapeake Publishing	
The Epoch Times	Rockville			Epoch Media Group	English & Chinese edition
The Frederick News-Post	Frederick	1883	Daily	Ogden Newspapers	
Gaffat Ethiopia : Amharic and English monthly newspaper	Adelphi	1992	Monthly		Focused on the Ethiopian-American community, and partially in Amharic.
Greenbelt News Review	Greenbelt	1937	Every Thursday	Greenbelt Cooperative Publishing Association	Worker Cooperative. Also published as Greenbelt Cooperator, 1937-1954.
Herald Mail	Hagerstown	1873	Daily	USA Today Co.	Formed by the merging of The Morning Herald 1873-1920 and The Daily Mail 1828-1920.
The Howard County Times	Ellicott City	1869	Daily	Baltimore Sun Media Group	Also published as The Ellicott City Times, 1869-1958. A unit of the Baltimore Sun Media Group as of 2016.
The Johns Hopkins News-Letter	Baltimore	1896	Weekly		Student newspaper for Johns Hopkins University.
Kaskad	Baltimore				Russian language newspaper aimed towards immigrants from Russia, Belarus, and other Russian speakers.
Kent County News	Chestertown	1793		Adams Publishing Group, Chesapeake Publishing	Also published as The Chestertown Spy.
The Kent Island Bay Times	Stevensville	1963	Weekly	Adams Publishing Group	Also known as Bay Times.
Latin Opinion	Baltimore	2004	Monthly		Bilingual in both Spanish and English.
The Maryland Coastal Dispatch	Ocean City	1984	Weekly	J. Steven Green	
Maryland Gazette	Annapolis	1727	Twice Weekly	Baltimore Sun Media Group	First newspaper published in Maryland.Merged with the Capital in 1910.
Maryland Independent	Charles County	1872	Twice weekly	Adams Publishing Group, Chesapeake Publishing	
The News Exchange	Baltimore	1978			Bilingual Russian and English newspaper
Pirmyn	Baltimore				Lithuanian-language newspaper
Polish Times	Baltimore				Polish-American newspaper
Potomac Almanac	Potomac, Maryland	1957	monthly		Founded by Beppie Noyes.
The Race Standard	Baltimore	1894	1898	African American newspaper.	
The Prince George’s Sentinel	Lanham	1932	Weekly	Berlyn Inc.	
The Record-Observer	Centreville		Weekly	Adams Publishing Group	
The Star Democrat	Easton	1799	Daily	Adams Publishing Group	Also published as The Republican, The Star, The Republican Star and Eastern Shore Political Luminary, The Republican Star and Eastern Shore General Advertiser, and The Republican Star. Purchased and merged with Eastern Shore General Advertiser, 1802-1814, Whig & Advocate, 1828-1841, Eastern-Shore Star, The Easton Star, The Easton Democrat, and The Democrat.
The Times-Record	Denton		Weekly	Adams Publishing Group	
The Valley Citizen	Middletown				
Washington Hispanic	Silver Spring	1994			Spanish-language newspaper.

== Defunct ==
Title	Locale	Year est.	Ceased	Notes
Aberdeen Enterprise	Aberdeen	1889	1988	Originally published 1889-1920. Merged with the Harford Democrat to form the Harford Democrat and Aberdeen Enterprise. in 1921. Republished under Aberdeen Enterprise name from 1986-1988.
Abington Patriot and Harford County Gazette	Abingdon	1805	1807	
African American News and World / African American News and World Report	Baltimore	1979	1984	
Allegheny Citizen	Frostburg	1950	1961	
The American Citizen	Baltimore	1879	1800s	African American newspaper.
American and Daily Advertiser	Baltimore	1799		
American Eagle	Cambridge	1855	circa 1864	Succeeded by Cambridge Intelligencer, 1865
Anne Arundel Advertiser	Annapolis	1870	1908	Also published as The Advertiser, 1898-1908. Merged with the Maryland Republican to form the Advertiser-Republican.
The American Republican and Baltimore Daily Clipper	Baltimore	1839	1875	Also published as Baltimore Clipper, 1839-1844, The Ocean, 1840-1844, American Republican, 1844-1847, Baltimore Daily Commercial, 1865-1867, The Daily Commercial, 1867-1869, The Evening Commercial, 1868-1869, and Evening Journal, 1871-1875.
Annapolis Gazette	Annapolis	1855	1874	
Annapolis News	Annapolis	1940	1952	
Baltimore American	Baltimore	1773	1964	Also published as Maryland Journal and the Baltimore Advertiser, 1773-1796, Eagle of Freedom; or, the Baltimore Town and Fell's Point Gazette, 1796-1798, Baltimore Intelligencer, 1798-1799, American and Baltimore Daily Advertiser, 1799-1802, American and Commercial Daily Advertiser, 1802-1853, American and Commercial Advertiser, 1854-1856, 1861-1869, Baltimore American and Commercial Advertiser, 1857-1861, 1870-1883. Merged with Baltimore News-Post to form Baltimore News-American.
Baltimore City Paper	Baltimore	1977	2017	Last published by Tronc, Inc. Also published as City Squeeze, 1977-1978.
Baltimore Commercial Journal and Lyford's Price-Current	Baltimore	1840	1849	A revival of the defunct Baltimore Price Current. It was succeeded by the Baltimore Price-Current and Weekly Journal of Commerce.
Baltimore Chronicle	Baltimore	1976	2003	
Baltimore County Advocate	Baltimore	1850	1864	Merged with the Baltimore County American to form The Baltimore County Union.
Baltimore County American	Towson	1858	1862	Merged with the Baltimore County Advocate to form The Baltimore County Union.
The Baltimore County Times	Baltimore			Published by Joy Bramble to focus on the African-American community.
The Baltimore County Union	Towson	1865	1912	Formed from the merging of Baltimore County Advocate and Baltimore County American.
Baltimore Daily Repository	Baltimore	1791		
Baltimore Evening Post	Baltimore	1792		
Baltimore Evening Herald	Baltimore			
Baltimore Evening Sun	Baltimore			
The Baltimore Examiner	Baltimore	2006	2009	
The Baltimore Exchange	Baltimore			
Baltimore Gazette	Baltimore	1862	1875	The name was revived in 2016 as a fake news website.
Baltimore Guide	Baltimore	1927	2016	
Baltimore Morning Herald	Baltimore	1900		
Baltimore News	Baltimore	1873	1934	Also published as Evening News, 1873-1875, Baltimore Daily News, 1876-1892. Merged with Baltimore Post to form Baltimore News-Post in 1934.
Baltimore News-American	Baltimore	1964	1986	Formed as a merger of the Baltimore News-Post and The Baltimore American.
Baltimore News-Post	Baltimore	1936	1964	
Baltimore Patriot	Baltimore			
Baltimore Post	Baltimore	1922	1934	Also published as Baltimore Daily Post, 1922-1929. Merged with Baltimore News to form Baltimore News-Post in 1934.
Baltimore Telegraphe	Baltimore	1795		
Baltimore Wecker	Baltimore	1851	1907	German language newspaper. Also published as Täglicher Baltimore Wecker (“Daily Baltimore Wecker”), Wochenblatt des Baltimore Wecker (“Weekly Baltimore Wecker”), and Baltimore Wecker: Sonntags-Blatt (“Sunday Baltimore Wecker”). A weekly edition called The Mirror was published from 1895-1907.
Bartgis's Marylandische Zeitung	Frederick	1785	1789	
Berlin Advance	Berlin			
Berlin News	Berlin			
Bethesda Tribune	Bethesda			
Bowie Blade	Bowie	1967	2021	Merged with the Bowie News in 1980 to become the Bowie Blade News.
Brooklyn-Curtis Bay Town Crier	Baltimore			
Brooklyn News	Baltimore			
The Brunswick Citizen	Brunswick	1971	2021	
Cambridge Chronicle	Cambridge	1828	circa 1855	Merged into the American Eagle (Cambridge, MD, 1855)
Cambridge Democrat	Cambridge	1840s	1860s	
Catoctin Clarion	Thurmont	1871	1942	Replaced by the Catoctin Enterprise.
Catoctin Enterprise	Thurmont	1940		
Cecil County Star	Elkton	1930s	1930s	
Cecil Guardian	Cecil County	2009	2018	
Cecil Star	North East	1880s	1920s	
Church Advocate	Baltimore	1890s		African American newspaper.
The Citizen	Cumberland	1961	1983	Also published as The Allegany Garrett Citizen, 1961.
Civilian	Cumberland	1828	1858	Also published as Phoenix Civilian, 1833-1840 and Cumberland Miners' Journal. Merged with the Cumberland Telegraph and Maryland Mining Register to form Civilian & Telegraph.
Civilian & Telegraph	Cumberland	1859	1905	Formed from the merging of the Cumberland Miners' Journal and Cumberland Telegraph and Maryland Mining Register.
The Colored Harvester	Baltimore	1890s		African American newspaper.
The Commonwealth	Baltimore	1915	1915	African American newspaper.
The Crusader	Hyattsville	1979		African American newspaper.
The Crusader	Upper Marlboro	1890s		African American newspaper.
Cumberland Freie Presse	Cumberland	1891	1896	
Cumberland News	Cumberland	1865	1869	
Cumberland Telegraph	Cumberland	1851	1858	Also published as Telegraph and Cumberland Telegraph and Maryland Mining Register. Merged with the Cumberland Miners' Journal to form Civilian & Telegraph.
Cumberland Times-News	Cumberland	1987	2009	
Czas Baltimorski	Baltimore	1940	unknown	Polish-language newspaper. Translates to Baltimore Times.
Daily Evening Chronotype	Baltimore	1867		African American newspaper.
The Daily Exchange	Baltimore	1858	1861	
Daily News	Cumberland	1890	1896	
Dawn	Baltimore	1887		African American newspaper.
The Dawn	Elkton	1890s		African American newspaper.
The Democratic Advocate	Westminster	1865	1968	
Democratic Messenger	Snow Hill	1869	1973	Merged with the Worcester Democrat to form the Worcester County Messenger.
Der Baltimore Israelit	Baltimore	1891	1893	Yiddish-language newspaper.
Der Deutsche Correspondent	Baltimore	1841	1918	German-language newspaper.
Der Fortschritt	Baltimore	1890	1890	Yiddish-language newspaper.
Der Wegweiser	Baltimore	1896	1896	Yiddish-language newspaper.
Dunlap's Maryland Gazette, or, The Baltimore General Advertiser	Baltimore	1775		
Easton Gazette	Easton	1822	circa 1929	Also published as the Gazette-Democrat, 1901-1902
Elkton Press	Elkton	1823	183?	
Ellicott City Times	Ellicott City	circa 1870	1958	Now published as The Howard County Times.
The Enterprise	Federal Hill			
The Frederick Post	Frederick			
Friends of the Hearth	Baltimore			Polish-language newspaper.
The Frostburg Forum	Frostburg	1897	1901	Now published as The Howard County Times.
The Frostburg Gleaner	Frostburg	1899	1901	Main focus was on the prohibition of alcohol.
The Frostburg Herald	Frostburg	1903	1906	Rival to Frostburg Mining Journal.
Frostburg Mining Journal	Frostburg	1871	1917	Rival to The Frostburg Herald. Also published as The Frostburg Spirit, 1913-1915.
The Frostburg News	Frostburg	1897	1897	
Gay Life	Baltimore	1979	2016	Also published as Baltimore Gay Paper, and Gay Paper. Merged into Baltimore OUTloud.
The Gazette (Maryland)	Germantown, Silver Spring/Takoma Park, Gaithersburg, Bethesda, Potomac, Burtonsville, Wheaton, Rockville, Olney, Damascus, Largo, Hyattsville, College Park, Upper Marlboro, Bowie, Landover, Laurel, Clinton, Mount Airy and Sykesville/Eldersburg	1959	2015	Last published by Nash Holdings. Selections of archived back issues for some editions can be found at the Maryland State Archives, UMD Libraries, and Montgomery History.
Genius of Universal Emancipation	Baltimore	1821	1839	Was established in Ohio, and then moved to Tennessee before moving to Baltimore in 1824.
Good News and Informer	Baltimore	1981		African American newspaper.
Ha-Pisgah	Baltimore	1891	1893	Yiddish-language newspaper.
Hammond Gazette	Point Lookout	1862	1864	
Harry	Baltimore	1969	1972	
Il Risorgimento Italiano Nel Maryland	Baltimore	1922	1930	Italian-language newspaper.
The Jewish Chronicle	Baltimore	1875	1877	Jewish newspaper.
Jewish Comment	Baltimore	1895	1895	Jewish newspaper.
Joy	Baltimore	1887		African American newspaper.
The Lancet	Baltimore	1900s	1900s	African American newspaper.
Laurel Leader	Laurel	1897	2021	
The Ledger	Baltimore	1898	1899	African American newspaper. Merged with the Afro-American to form the Afro-American Ledger.
Ledger-Enterprise	Pocomoke City	1896	1921	Also published as Ledger Enterprise. It was formed by the merging of the Worcester Enterprise and the Peninsula Ledger. It merged with the Worcester Democrat to form the Worcester Democrat and the Ledger-Enterprise.
The Lonaconing Star	Lonaconing			
The Lyceum Observer	Baltimore	1863	1860s	African American newspaper. Merged with the Afro-American to form the Afro-American Ledger.
Maryland Advocate & Farmer's & Mechanics Register	Cumberland	1831	1835	
Maryland Free Press	Hagerstown	1862	1876	On hiatus from 1863-1866. Also published as Reporter and Advertiser, 1875-1876.
Maryland Gazette	Annapolis	1727	1734	
Maryland Herald & Elizabeth-Town Advertiser	Hagerstown	1797	1801	
Maryland Gazette, and Frederick Weekly Advertiser	Frederick	1790		Became Political Intelligencer, or, Republican Gazette in 1824
Maryland Hawk	Temple Hills	1984		African American newspaper.
Maryland Herald, and Eastern Shore Intelligencer	Easton	1790	1799	
Maryland Journal	Baltimore	1773	1797	Maryland Journal and (the) Baltimore Advertiser; Maryland Journal, and Baltimore Universal Daily Advertiser; Maryland Journal, & Baltimore Daily Advertiser
Maryland Republican	Annapolis	1809	1908	Merged with Anne Arundel Advertiser to form the Advertiser-Republican in 1908
Maryland Suffrage News	Baltimore	1912	1920	Ended publication with the ratification of the Nineteenth Amendment.
The Maryland Times-Press				
The Midland Journal	Rising Sun	1885	1947	
Montgomery County Sentinel	Rockville	1855	2020	
The Monthly Chronicle Of Religion And Learning	Baltimore	1875	1870s	African American newspaper. Merged with the Afro-American to form the Afro-American Ledger.
The Morning Herald	Hagerstown	1873		
Montgomery Journal				
Mountain City Times	Cumberland	1865	1869	
Muhammad Speaks	Baltimore	1981	unknown	African American newspaper.
The Negro Appeal	Baltimore	1899	1900	African American newspaper.
Neighborhood Talk	Landover	1899	1900	African American newspaper.
The News	Frederick			
North-East Star	North East	1880s	1880s	
Northwest Star	Pikesville	1966	1988	
Owings Mill Times	Owings Mills	1986	2006	
Palladium of Freedom	Baltimore	1787	1787	
Peninsula Ledger	Pocomoke City	1885	1896	Merged with the Worcester Enterprise to form the Ledger-Enterprise.
Pioneer	Dundalk	1938		
Port Tobacco Times	Port Tobacco	1844	1898	Also published as Port Tobacco Times and Charles County Advertiser, 1845-1898. Merged with the Crescent to form the Times Crescent.
The Prince George's County Times	Prince George's County			Focuses on the African-American community. Published by Joy Bramble.
Prohibition Advocate	Baltimore	1890s		African American newspaper.
Queenstown News	Queenstown	circa 1882	1956	Merged with the Queen Anne's Record-Observer to form the Queen Anne's Record-Observer and Queenstown News (Centreville, MD) in 1956
The Race Standard	Baltimore	1894	1898	African American newspaper.
Republican Star, or, Eastern Shore Political Luminary	Easton	1799		Became Easton Star in 1843
Rockville Times	Rockville			
The Shore Times				Focuses on the African-American community. Published by Joy Bramble.
Silver Spring Suburban Record	Silver Spring			
The South	Baltimore			
Star	Baltimore	1887		African American newspaper.
Straight From the Street	Hyattsville	1900s		African American newspaper.
Telegraf	Baltimore	1909	1951	Published in Czech.
Trench and Camp	Admiral	1917	1919	World War I newspaper for military personnel at Camp Meade.
The True Communicator	Baltimore	1865	1866	African American newspaper.
The Voice of Labor	Cumberland	1938	1942	Was merged into The CIO News.
The Washington Spy	Hagerstown	1790	1797	
Weekly Civilian	Cumberland	1892	1897	
Western Maryland Democrat	Westminster	1863	1865	Succeeded by The Democratic Advocate.
Western Maryland Voice of Industrial Labor	Cumberland	1938	1942	
Worcester Democrat	Pocomoke City	1880	1973	First published as the Worcester Democrat from 1880-1921. Merged with the Ledger-Enterprise to form the Worcester Democrat and the Ledger-Enterprise in 1921, and published under that name until 1953. Name changed back to the Worcester Democrat in 1953. Merged with Democratic Messenger to form the Worcester County Messenger in 1973.
Worcester Enterprise	Pocomoke City	1894	1896	Also known as the Pocomoke Enterprise. Merged with the Peninsula Ledger to form the Ledger Enterprise.
The Worcester County Messenger	Pocomoke City	1973	2005	Formed by the merging of the Worcester Democrat and the Democratic Messenger. It was merged with Maryland Times Press to form the Worcester County Times.

== See also ==
- List of newspapers in Maryland in the 18th century
- Ethnic press in Baltimore
- Maryland media
  - List of radio stations in Maryland
  - List of television stations in Maryland
  - Media of locales in Maryland: Baltimore, College Park, Cumberland, Frederick, Gaithersburg
- Journalism:
  - Category:Journalists from Maryland
  - University of Maryland Philip Merrill College of Journalism in College Park
- Maryland literature
U.S. newspapers

Comprehensive

- Lists of newspapers
- List of newspapers in the United States

Frequency

- List of free daily newspapers in the United States
- List of weekly newspapers in the United States

Circulation

- List of international newspapers originating in the United States
- List of national newspapers in the United States
- List of newspapers in the United States by circulation

Foreign language

- List of French-language newspapers published in the United States
- List of German-language newspapers published in the United States
- List of Spanish-language newspapers published in the United States

Specialty

- List of African-American newspapers in the United States
- List of alternative weekly newspapers in the United States
- List of business newspapers in the United States
- List of family-owned newspapers in the United States
- List of Jewish newspapers in the United States
- List of LGBTQ periodicals in the United States
- List of student newspapers in the United States
- List of supermarket tabloids in the United States
- List of underground press in the United States

Other

- List of defunct newspapers of the United States

== Bibliography ==
- Danky, James Philip; Hady, Maureen E. (1998). African-American newspapers and periodicals : a national bibliography. Cambridge, Mass: Harvard University Press. ISBN 9780674007888.
- S. N. D. North; United States Department of the Interior (1884). "Catalogue of Periodical Publications: Maryland". History and Present Condition of the Newspaper and Periodical Press of the United States. Washington, D.C.: Government Printing Office. OCLC 1850475. (+ List of titles 50+ years old)
- James T. Haley, ed. (1895), "Newspapers: Maryland", Afro-American Encyclopaedia, Nashville: Haley & Florida, hdl:2027/inu.30000029292855, OCLC 219597043
- "Maryland". American Newspaper Directory. New York: George P. Rowell. 1900. pp. 397+. hdl:2027/umn.31951002273861a.
- John Van Ness Ingram (1912). "Maryland". Check List of American Eighteenth Century Newspapers in the Library of Congress. U.S. Government Printing Office. pp. 24+.
- Clarence S. Brigham (April 1915). "Bibliography of American newspapers, 1690-1820: part 3: Maryland to Massachusetts (Boston)". Proceedings of the American Antiquarian Society. 25 (1): 128–293.
- "Maryland". American Newspaper Annual & Directory. Philadelphia: N. W. Ayer & Son. 1922. pp. 401+. hdl:2027/umn.31951001295695n – via HathiTrust.
- George C. Keidel. The Earliest German Newspapers of Baltimore: An Essay. Washington: Privately printed, 1927
- Federal Writers' Project (1940), "The Press", Maryland: a Guide to the Old Line State, American Guide Series, New York: Oxford University Press, pp. 107+, ISBN 9781603540193 – via Google Books

== Images ==
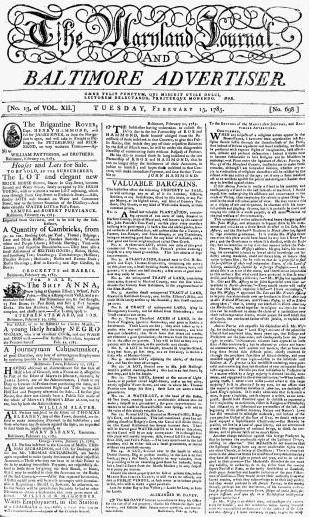
Maryland Journal, and Baltimore Advertiser, 1785
