= Greenbelt Cooperative Publishing Ass'n v. Bresler =

Greenbelt Cooperative Publishing Assn., Inc. v. Bresler
- Supreme Court of the United States

Argued February 24–25, 1970 Decided May 18, 1970
- Full case name: Greenbelt Cooperative Publishing Association, Inc., et al., Petitioners v. Charles S. Bresler
- Citations: 398 U.S. 6 (more) 90 S. Ct. 1537; 26 L. Ed. 2d 6; 1970 U.S. LEXIS 42; 1 Media L. Rep. 1589

Case history
- Prior: 253 Md. 324, 252 A.2d 755 (1969); cert. granted, 396 U.S. 874 (1969).

Holding
- Held that using the word "blackmail" in a newspaper article about a public figure "was no more than rhetorical hyperbole" and that finding such usage as libel "would subvert the most fundamental meaning of a free press".

Court membership
- Chief Justice Warren E. Burger Associate Justices Hugo Black · William O. Douglas; John M. Harlan II · William J. Brennan Jr. Potter Stewart · Byron White; Thurgood Marshall

Case opinions
- Majority: Stewart, joined by Burger, Harlan, Brennan, Marshall, Blackmun
- Concurrence: White
- Concurrence: Black, joined by Douglas

Laws applied
- U.S. Const. amend. I

Greenbelt Cooperative Publishing Association, Inc. v. Bresler, 398 U.S. 6 (1970), is a United States Supreme Court case in which the Court held that using the word "blackmail" in a newspaper article "was no more than rhetorical hyperbole" and that finding such usage as libel "would subvert the most fundamental meaning of a free press" guaranteed by the First Amendment to the United States Constitution. The respondent's status as a public figure was not in dispute.

== Background ==
Dorothy Sucher, a reporter for the Greenbelt News Review of Greenbelt, Maryland, covered a 1965 city council hearing in a case where developer Charles S. Bresler was trying to obtain variances to build a high-density housing development on land he owned while the city was seeking to purchase a parcel owned by Bresler that would be the site of a new high school. Bresler indicated that he would be willing to sell the property the city wanted as long as he received the variances he was seeking. Residents at the hearing were critical of the deal and of the way that Bresler was using the leverage he had in delaying the sale of the proposed high school property to obtain the right to build more densely on the properties he owned. An article written by Sucher in the October 14, 1965 issue of the Greenbelt News Review reporting on the council meeting quoted a resident saying that "It seems that this is a slight case of blackmail" continuing to state that "the word was echoed by many speakers from the audience" a charge that was rejected in the article by a city councilmember who said that this was not blackmail, but was part of a negotiations process that was "a two-way street". Bresler filed a lawsuit in Prince George's County circuit court claiming that the allegations and use of the word "blackmail" constituted libel, and a jury found in his favor, awarding him $5,000 in compensatory damages and $12,500 in punitive damages. The judgment was affirmed by the Maryland Court of Appeals, and certiorari was granted by the U.S. Supreme Court.

== Opinion of the Court ==
In 1970, the U.S. Supreme Court ruled 8–0 to overturn the lower court ruling. The majority found that Bresler, who served in another district as a member of the Maryland House of Delegates, was a public figure as defined by New York Times Co. v. Sullivan (1964) and that the standard that the plaintiff would have to satisfy would be to show that the term was used with malice, with knowledge that the claim was false or in reckless disregard for the truth. The Supreme Court found that the lower court judge's instructions were incorrect in setting a standard for making a verdict. The court found no dispute with the contention that the descriptions in Sucher's article were accurately reported and that the word "blackmail" had been used. The opinion written by Associated Justice Potter Stewart found that "even the most careless reader must have perceived that the word was no more than rhetorical hyperbole" and that "It is simply impossible to believe that a reader who reached the word 'blackmail' in either article would not have understood exactly what was meant" and that no reader would have interpreted the word in question to mean that Bresler had committed the criminal offense. To have ruled otherwise "would subvert the most fundamental meaning of a free press".
