= Julius Timoleon Ducatel =

American chemist (1796–1849)

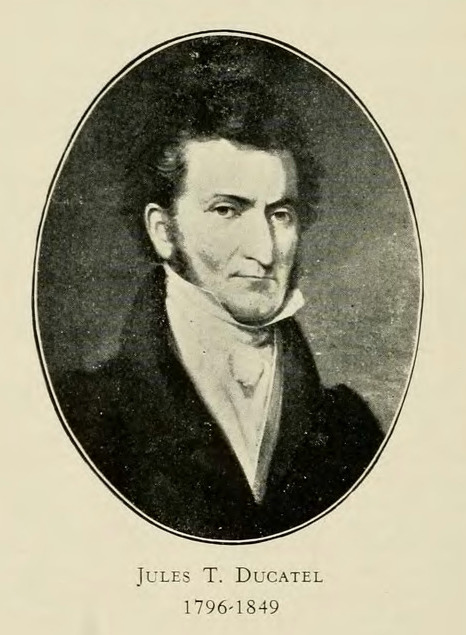
- Born: June 6, 1796; Baltimore
- Died: April 23, 1849 (aged 52); Baltimore
- Occupation: Chemist, geologist

Julius Timoleon Ducatel (June 6, 1796 - April 23, 1849) was an American chemist.

== Education and Paris years ==
He was educated at St. Mary's College, and then became associated in business with his father, long the principal pharmacist in Baltimore. His experience in this direction developed a fondness for the study of the natural sciences, and he turned to Paris, where for several years he was occupied in this pursuit.

== Academic career ==
=== Professorships and varied interests ===
Soon after his return to Baltimore he became professor of natural philosophy in the Mechanics' institute, and later professor of chemistry and geology in the University of Maryland, Baltimore. His ability as a scientist and his success as a lecturer afterward led to his election to the chair of chemistry in the medical department of the university. From 1832 till 1841 he held appointments in connection with the State geological survey, at first in the preliminary work, and then as geologist. Meanwhile he had been made professor of chemistry, mineralogy, and geology in St. John's College, Annapolis, but he resigned both of these posts in 1839 in order to devote more time to his specialty of geology.

=== Geological exploration ===
In 1843 he made a geological exploration of the upper Mississippi in connection with an expedition sent to that region, and in 1846 visited the Lake Superior district for persons interested in the industrial development of that country. He delivered an interesting series of lectures on his return, giving an account of his experiences.

=== Membership of scientific organisations, publications ===
Ducatel was a member of scientific societies at home and abroad, and regularly contributed scientific articles to the Baltimore Times and the American Farmer. His principal work was a Manual of Toxicology (Baltimore, 1848).
