= The Frostburg Herald =

Defunct American newspaper

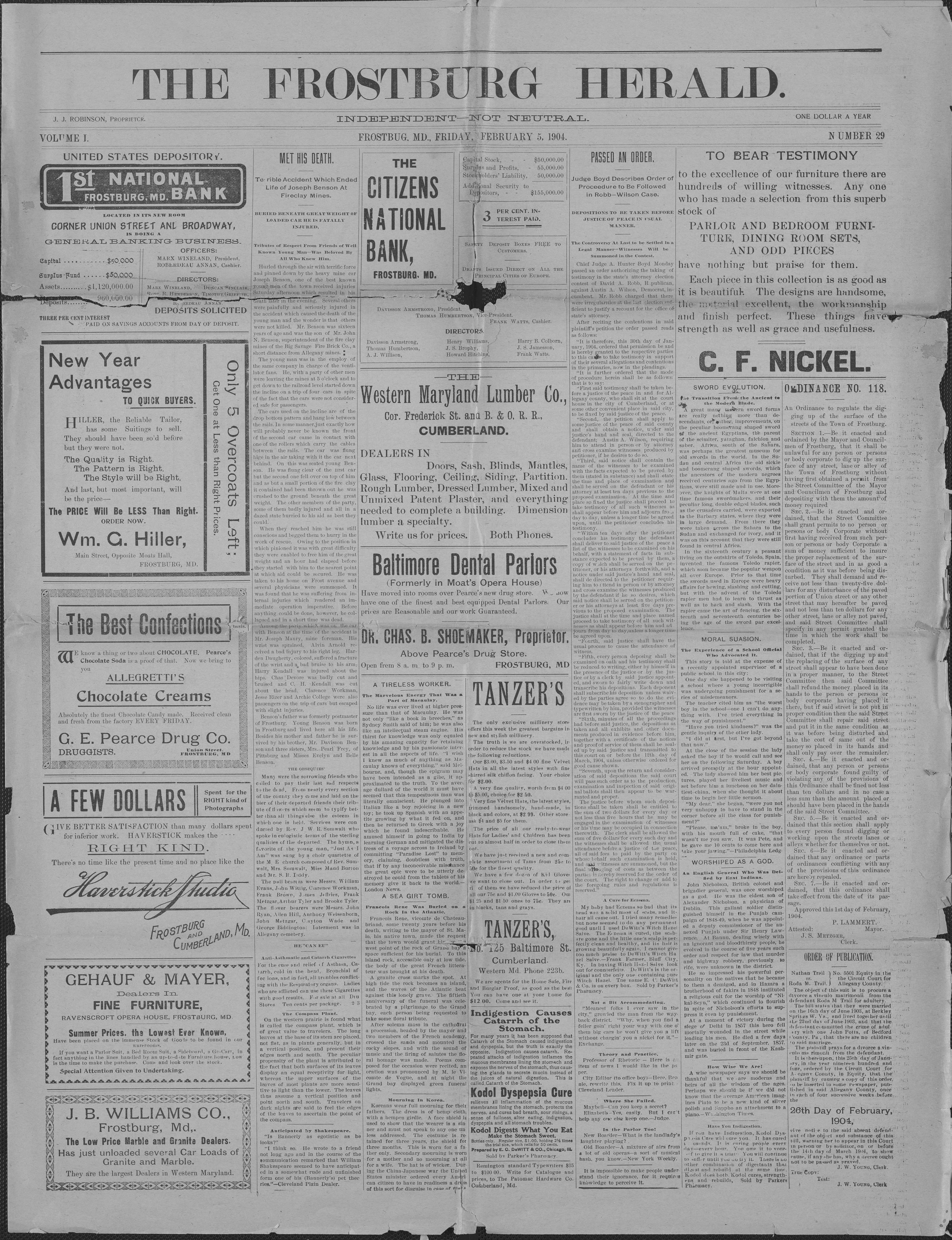
- The cover page of the February 5, 1904 issue
- Publisher: J.J. Robinson

The Frostburg Herald was a weekly newspaper that was published from 1903 to around 1906 in Frostburg, Maryland, U.S. by John J. Robinson, a former coal miner. Robinson was also the editor of The Lonaconing Star from 1886 to 1905 in nearby Lonaconing, Maryland. The Herald's motto proclaimed that the publication was "Independent--Not Neutral," the same motto that Robinson used for the Star. The newspaper's editorial positions advocated for honest government and a fair shake for the working people of Maryland. Robinson made it known that the intent of his paper was "to boldly, jealously and relentlessly do all in its power to safeguard the interests of the people," exemplifying this in the same issue with an exposé of the Frostburg city council's secret meetings under the headline: "The People Were Not Consulted."

The Frostburg Herald set itself in opposition to Frostburg's other main newspaper, the Frostburg Mining Journal, and its editor J. Benson Oder targeted Robinson with continuous jibes. Robinson was no stranger to editorial conflict, having previously (and unsuccessfully) attempted to sue the editor of The Frostburg Forum, John Farrell, for libel in 1898. These attacks escalated in June 1900, when Robinson was assaulted by rioting miners in Lonaconing. The perpetrators would later be found not guilty. In 1905, Robinson was sued by western Maryland's chief organizer of striking mine workers, William M. Wardjon, for libel; Robinson had publicly accused Wardjon of assaulting a nineteen-year-old girl. As a result, the offices of The Lonaconing Star were burned down by rioters, forcing Robinson to move his operations to the Herald's offices. This did not deter the rioters, who subsequently smashed the Herald's office's front windows.

Though the Herald featured a wealth of advertisements from local firms, it was ultimately unsuccessful. The exact date that the Herald ceased publication is unknown, but is conjectured to be between 1905 and 1910, when Robinson moved to Cumberland, Maryland to work for the Cumberland Evening Times.
