= Bay Times =

Bay Times may refer to:

- San Francisco Bay Times
- The Kent Island Bay Times
