= List of African American newspapers in Maryland =

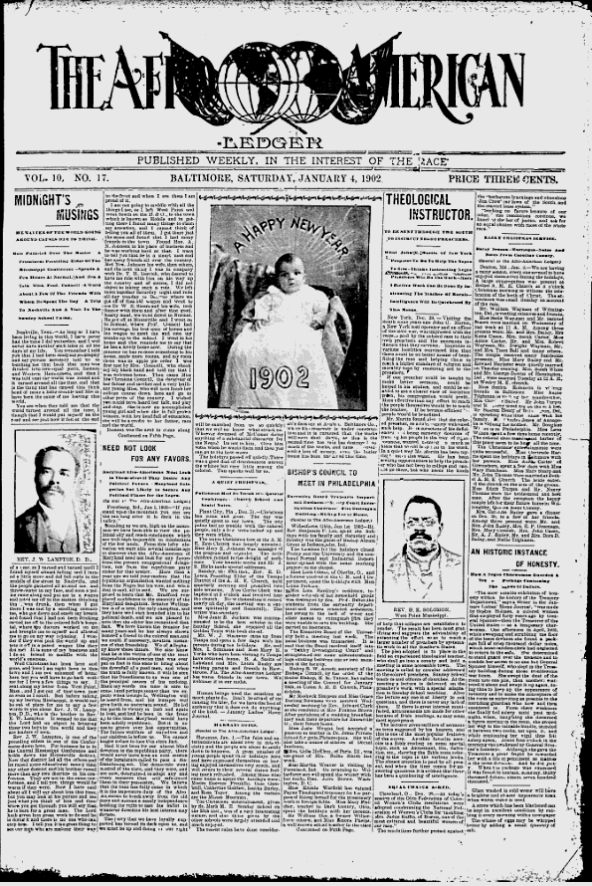
Front page of The Afro-American Ledger, today the Baltimore Afro-American, from January 1902.

This is a list of African American newspapers that have been published in the state of Maryland. It includes both current and historical newspapers.

Maryland's first known African American newspaper was The Lyceum Observer, launched by members of the Galbreath Lyceum in 1863. It was followed in 1865 by The True Communicator, which is also sometimes named as the state's first African American newspaper.

As in many other states, the late 19th century saw a dramatic growth in Maryland's African American press, with 31 newspapers launched in Baltimore before 1900. Most were short-lived. A notable exception was The Afro-American, which launched in Baltimore in 1892 and continues today.

In addition to The Afro-American, other notable newspapers published in Maryland today include the Baltimore Times and The Prince George’s Post.

== Newspapers ==
City	Title	Beginning	End	Frequency	Call numbers	Remarks
Adelphi	Gaffat Ethiopia / Gaffat	1992		Monthly newspaper	OCLC 27806235	Focused on the Ethiopian-American community.; Partially in Amharic.
Baltimore	African American News and World / African American News and World Report	1979	1984?	Weekly	LCCN 98062569; OCLC 40118959	Published by Catherine E. Pugh.
Baltimore	The Afro-American (1892–1900, 1915–) / Afro-American Ledger (1900–1915) / Baltimore Afro-American	1892	current	Weekly	The Afro-American (1892–): ISSN 2473-5922; LCCN 2011254020, 00252024, sn8309626; OCLC 192107159, 11751962, 9235910, 7645599, 4393753, 2698193; Afro-American Ledger (1900–1915): ISSN 2473-5965; LCCN sn83045756, 00252026; OCLC 9721724, 4393846, 7645666	Official site; Free online archive; Merged with Ledger in 1900.
Baltimore	The American Citizen	1879	1800s	Weekly	LCCN 2011254039, sn83027092; OCLC 664616228, 9948094, 22156041	Edited by Daniel Williams.
Baltimore	Church Advocate	1890s		Weekly		
Baltimore	The Colored Harvester	1890s		Weekly		
Baltimore	The Commonwealth	1915	1915	Weekly	LCCN 2011254356, sn83027090; OCLC 747723326, 9902528	
Baltimore	Dawn	1887	?	Weekly		
Baltimore	Daily Evening Chronotype	1867	?	Daily (six days a week)		Published by Mansfield, Hobbs, & Co.; Second African American daily newspaper ever published, after La Tribune de la Nouvelle-Orleans.; One issue survives, from February 18, 1867.
Baltimore	Good News and Informer	1981?	?	Bimonthly newspaper	OCLC 32791628	Extant through at least 1982.
Baltimore	Joy	1887	?	Weekly		
Baltimore	The Lancet	1900s	1900s	Weekly	LCCN sn88065132; OCLC 18579802	Extant in June 1902.
Baltimore	The Ledger	1898	1899	Weekly	ISSN 2473-5949; LCCN 00252025, 2018252112, sn83045833; OCLC 42347909, 1062885119, 9717406	Published by W.E. Tabb; Merged with the Afro-American, which thereafter for a time was named the Afro-American Ledger.
Baltimore	The Lyceum Observer	1863	1860s	Monthly	LCCN sn88065197; OCLC 18853991	First African American newspaper in Baltimore.; Co-founded by a group of lyceum members including Christian Fleetwood and Alfred Ward Handy.
Baltimore	The Monthly Chronicle Of Religion And Learning	1875	1870s	Monthly newspaper	LCCN sn88065150; OCLC 18680788	Published by C.B. Perry.
Baltimore	Muhammad Speaks	1981	?	Unknown		
Baltimore	The Negro Appeal	1899	1900	Weekly	LCCN 2013254335, sn84025821; OCLC 845108487, 10337773, 2753738	Published by S. Timothy Tice.
Baltimore	Prohibition Advocate	1890s		Weekly		
Baltimore	The Race Standard	1894	1898	Weekly	LCCN 2014254319, sn83016481; OCLC 876293844, 9864898, 2806324	Edited by G. Wellington Bryant.
Baltimore	Star	1887	?	Weekly		
Baltimore	The Baltimore Times	1987?	current	Weekly	OCLC 26486022	Official site; Published by Joy Bramble and edited by Ernie Boston.
Baltimore	The True Communicator	1865	1866	Weekly or twice-weekly		No copies survive.; Edited by George T. Cook.; Published at Baltimore's Douglass Institute.
Elkton	The Dawn	1890s		Monthly newspaper		
Hyattsville	The Crusader	1979	?	Weekly	LCCN sn99063213; OCLC 41091736	
Hyattsville	Straight From The Street	1990s	?	Monthly newspaper	ISSN 1061-5237; LCCN sn92003166; OCLC 25375385	
Landover	Neighborhood Talk	1987	?	Weekly		Published by Legusta Floyd and edited by Bianca Floyd.
Temple Hills	Maryland Hawk	1984	?	Weekly	LCCN sn90057060; OCLC 21166035	Published by Ben Holman.
Upper Marlboro	The Crusader	1890s		Weekly		
Upper Marlboro	The Prince George’s Post / Prince George's Post-Sentinel	1932	current	Weekly	ISSN 1053-2226; LCCN sn90057050; OCLC 21191451	Official site; Edited by Legusta Floyd.

== See also ==
- List of African American newspapers and media outlets
- List of African American newspapers in Delaware
- List of African American newspapers in Pennsylvania
- List of African American newspapers in Virginia
- List of African American newspapers in Washington, D.C.
- List of newspapers in Maryland

== Works cited ==
- Danky, James Philip; Hady, Maureen E., eds. (1998). African-American newspapers and periodicals : a national bibliography. Harvard University Press. ISBN 9780674007888.
- Farrar, Hayward (1998). The Baltimore Afro-American, 1892-1950. Greenwood Publishing Group. ISBN 9780313305177.
- Lee, Alfred McClung (2000). The Daily Newspaper in America, Volume 1. Routledge. ISBN 9780415228916.
- Pride, Armistead Scott; Wilson, Clint C. (1997). A History of the Black Press. Howard University Press. ISBN 9780882581927.
- Scharf, John Thomas (1881). History of Baltimore City and County, from the Earliest Period to the Present Day. L.H. Everts.
- Tanner, Benjamin Tucker (1867). An Apology for African Methodism. ISBN 9783849643805.
