= The Jews of Prime Time =

2003 book by David Zurawik

- Author: David Zurawik
- Language: English
- Genre: Nonfiction
- Published: 2003
- Publisher: Brandeis University Press
- Publication place: United States
- Media type: Print
- Pages: 275
- ISBN: 9781584652342
- OCLC: 51222186

The Jews of Prime Time is a 2003 book by David Zurawik.

== Reception ==
David Bianculli, a TV critic at the time for National Public Radio’s "Fresh Air" and the New York Daily News, wrote in his review, "(Zurawik's) own thorough and thoroughly entertaining insights about so many TV shows, from 'The Goldbergs' and 'Rhoda' to 'Seinfeld' and 'The Nanny,' make this one of the most important, well-researched and addictively readable television books ever written." Book reviewer Joe Rosenberg wrote in the Baltimore Chronicle, "According to Zurawik, the Jewish heads of pre-cable television at CBS, NBC, and ABC—like the Hollywood moguls of the pre-TV era and the owners of the New York Times and Washington Post—did not want to ‘taint’ their programming with 'Jewishness.'" The book was reviewed in American Jewish History, Library Journal, Judaism, and The Chronicle of Higher Education.
