= The Baltimore Exchange =

Baltimore newspaper

The Baltimore Exchange was a newspaper based in Baltimore, Maryland during the Civil War.

== History ==
On August 12, 1861, The New York Times published parts of a letter purportedly from John L. Hodsen, the Adjutant-General of the State of Maine, in which he observed troops from Maine with handcuffs nooses to hang traitors. With the Baltimore Exchange described in the article by the Times as "the organ of the aristocratic wing of the Secessionists of that City," the exchange argued the letter proved that "thirty thousand handcuffs were found with the Union Army." The op-ed claimed that the story was described as a "feeble attempt to vindicate Beauregard's infamous falsehood" by the Baltimore Exchange.

On August 21, 1861, the Baltimore Exchange published a letter from Washington at the start of the Civil War arguing that "No one here believes for a moment that it is any part of the Confederate plan to attack the intrenchments and defences opposite Washington -- least of all, to attack the Capital directly. They appreciate too intelligently the force of Northern sentiment on this point. Such a demonstration, if ever contemplated, has doubtless been long since abandoned."

On August 28, 1861, The New York Times published a war report that described the Baltimore Exchange as "a rebel paper and likely to be accurately informed of rebel movements," with the exchange having recently reported that General Lee was in Western Virginia with 37,000 men.

== See also ==
- List of newspapers in Maryland
- List of newspapers in Maryland in the 18th century
- Telegraf (Baltimore newspaper)
- Media in Baltimore
- Baltimore Gazette
