= The Beacon Newspapers =

American newspaper publisher serving adults age 50 and older

The Beacon
- Type: Monthly newspaper
- Owner(s): The Beacon Newspapers, Inc.
- Founder(s): Stuart Rosenthal and Judy Rosenthal
- Publisher: Gordon Hasenei
- Founded: November 1989
- Headquarters: Kensington, Maryland, United States
- Circulation: 195,000 (as of 2026)
- Website: thebeaconnewspapers.com

The Beacon is a free monthly newspaper for adults age 50 and older published by The Beacon Newspapers, Inc., an American newspaper company based in Kensington, Maryland. Founded in 1989 as the Senior Beacon of Greater Washington, the newspaper publishes regional editions serving the Washington metropolitan area, the Baltimore metropolitan area and Northern Virginia.

As of 2026, The Beacon Newspapers publishes three regional editions with a combined monthly circulation of approximately 195,000 copies. The newspapers cover health, personal finance, housing, technology, travel, the arts and other subjects of interest to older adults and their families.

== History ==
=== Founding and early years ===
The newspaper was founded in 1989 by Stuart and Judy Rosenthal. Stuart Rosenthal, who had worked as a tax attorney, and Judy Rosenthal, a magazine editor, established the publication to serve older readers in the Washington metropolitan area.

The first issue was published in November 1989 under the name Senior Beacon of Greater Washington. Approximately 15,000 copies of the first edition were printed. The Rosenthals initially distributed the newspaper themselves to restaurants and residential buildings along Wisconsin and Connecticut avenues in the Washington area.

The Library of Virginia catalogs the Senior Beacon as a monthly newspaper established in 1989 and published by Senior Beacon of Greater Washington, Inc.

In 1998, Rosenthal appeared in the record of a hearing before the United States Senate Committee on Finance concerning private contracting in Medicare. The hearing record identified him as publisher of the Senior Beacon.

The company later established its headquarters in Kensington, Maryland. By 2013, the newspaper had 13 full-time employees in addition to freelance writers.

=== Expansion and name change ===
The Beacon expanded beyond the Washington metropolitan area with the establishment of a Baltimore edition in 2003. [Citation needed]

In the mid-2000s, the publication began de-emphasizing the word "Senior" in its name. The word was gradually made less prominent before being removed from the newspaper's name around 2007. The change was intended to broaden the newspaper's appeal among readers age 50 and older.

In 2010, The Beacon Newspapers launched an edition serving Howard County, Maryland. [Citation needed]

By 2013, the company published editions serving the Washington metropolitan area, Baltimore and Howard County, Maryland.

At the time, The Washington Post described The Beacon as the largest-circulation print publication for older readers in the Washington metropolitan area. Publisher Stuart Rosenthal estimated that the newspaper had more than 200,000 readers in the Washington region and approximately 400,000 readers across all of its editions.

=== Fifty Plus Richmond ===
In January 2017, The Beacon Newspapers expanded into the Richmond, Virginia, market with Fifty Plus Richmond.

The publication had previously been founded by Mark Fetter. Following Fetter's death, The Beacon Newspapers assumed publication of the newspaper.

Fifty Plus Richmond ceased publication with its June 2022 issue. The company attributed the closure to insufficient advertising support.

=== Ownership change and publication reorganization ===
Stuart and Judy Rosenthal owned The Beacon Newspapers from its founding until the end of 2025. Gordon Hasenei acquired the company effective December 31, 2025, and became its publisher, president and chief executive officer.

In 2026, the company reorganized its regional publications. The Baltimore and Howard County editions were combined to create the Greater Baltimore Beacon. Northern Virginia became a standalone regional edition, while the former Washington edition became the DC/Suburban Maryland Beacon.

Following the reorganization, The Beacon Newspapers published three regional editions with a combined monthly circulation of approximately 195,000 copies.

== Publications and distribution ==
The Beacon Newspapers publishes three free monthly regional editions:

- the DC/Suburban Maryland Beacon, serving Washington, D.C., and communities in suburban Maryland;
- the Greater Baltimore Beacon, serving Baltimore, Howard County and surrounding communities; and
- the Northern Virginia Beacon, serving communities in Northern Virginia.

Approximately 65,000 copies of each edition are printed monthly, for a combined circulation of approximately 195,000 copies.

The newspapers are distributed free of charge at locations including libraries, community centers, residential communities, healthcare facilities, grocery stores and other public locations. Paid home-delivery subscriptions are also available.

The Beacon's print publications are supported primarily by advertising. In 2013, The Washington Post reported that the newspaper was fully funded by advertising and that print advertising remained the company's primary source of revenue.

== Editorial content ==
The Beacon publishes articles on health and wellness, personal finance, retirement, housing, caregiving, technology, travel and the arts.

The newspapers also publish local features, profiles, columns, theater reviews, puzzles, event listings and classified advertising. In 2013, The Washington Post described the publication's coverage as ranging from travel and personal finance to health issues and consumer fraud.

The newspaper's editorial focus has evolved as its readership has come to include multiple generations of older adults. The publication has covered subjects affecting both members of the baby boom generation and older generations.

Articles from the print editions are also published on the newspaper's website.

== Beacon 50+Expo ==
The Beacon Newspapers organizes the Beacon 50+Expo, a public event for older adults and their families.

The event was first held in 1998. A 2002 record of the Fairfax County Board of Supervisors described that year's Older Adult Expo as the fifth annual event and identified the Senior Beacon as one of its presenters.

The Expos have included exhibitors representing healthcare organizations, government agencies, nonprofit organizations, retirement communities, financial services companies and other organizations serving older adults. The events have also included health screenings, educational presentations and entertainment.

As of 2026, the Beacon 50+Expo had been presented for 27 years.

== Other publications ==
The Beacon Newspapers also publishes resource guides containing information about government agencies, nonprofit organizations, businesses and services for older adults and their families.

The company's publications include the Montgomery County Seniors' Resource Guide. Copies of the guide have been published since at least 1995. [Citation needed]

== Awards and recognition ==
The Beacon and members of its staff have received awards for journalism, writing and publication design.

The newspaper has received recognition from the North American Mature Publishers Association. Award records from the organization identify The Beacon - Washington, DC and The Beacon - Baltimore, MD among publications recognized in its annual competition.

In 2013, The Washington Post published a feature about The Beacon's history, readership and continued focus on print publishing. The newspaper described The Beacon as the largest-circulation print publication for older readers in the Washington metropolitan area.

== See also ==
- List of newspapers in Maryland
- List of newspapers in Washington, D.C.
- List of newspapers in Virginia
