= National Newspaper Publishers Association =

Association of African American newspaper publishers

The National Newspaper Publishers Association (NNPA), formerly the National Negro Publishers Association, is an association of African American newspaper publishers from across the United States. It was established in 1940 and took its current name in 1956.

== History ==
The NNPA was founded in 1940 when John H. Sengstacke, the second publisher of the Chicago Defender, organized a meeting with other African American publishers intended for "harmonizing our energies in a common purpose for the benefit of Negro journalism". Sengstacke succeeded in realizing a dream that his uncle, Robert Sengstacke Abbott, had for many years. Fittingly, Abbott died on the morning of the inaugural conference on February 29, 1940. The younger Sengstacke was selected as the first president of the NNPA, and D. Arnett Murphy, the son of John H. Murphy Sr., who published the Baltimore Afro-American, was selected as the eastern vice president. In 1956, the trade association changed the name to the current moniker. As of 1966, it was headquartered in Louisville, Kentucky.

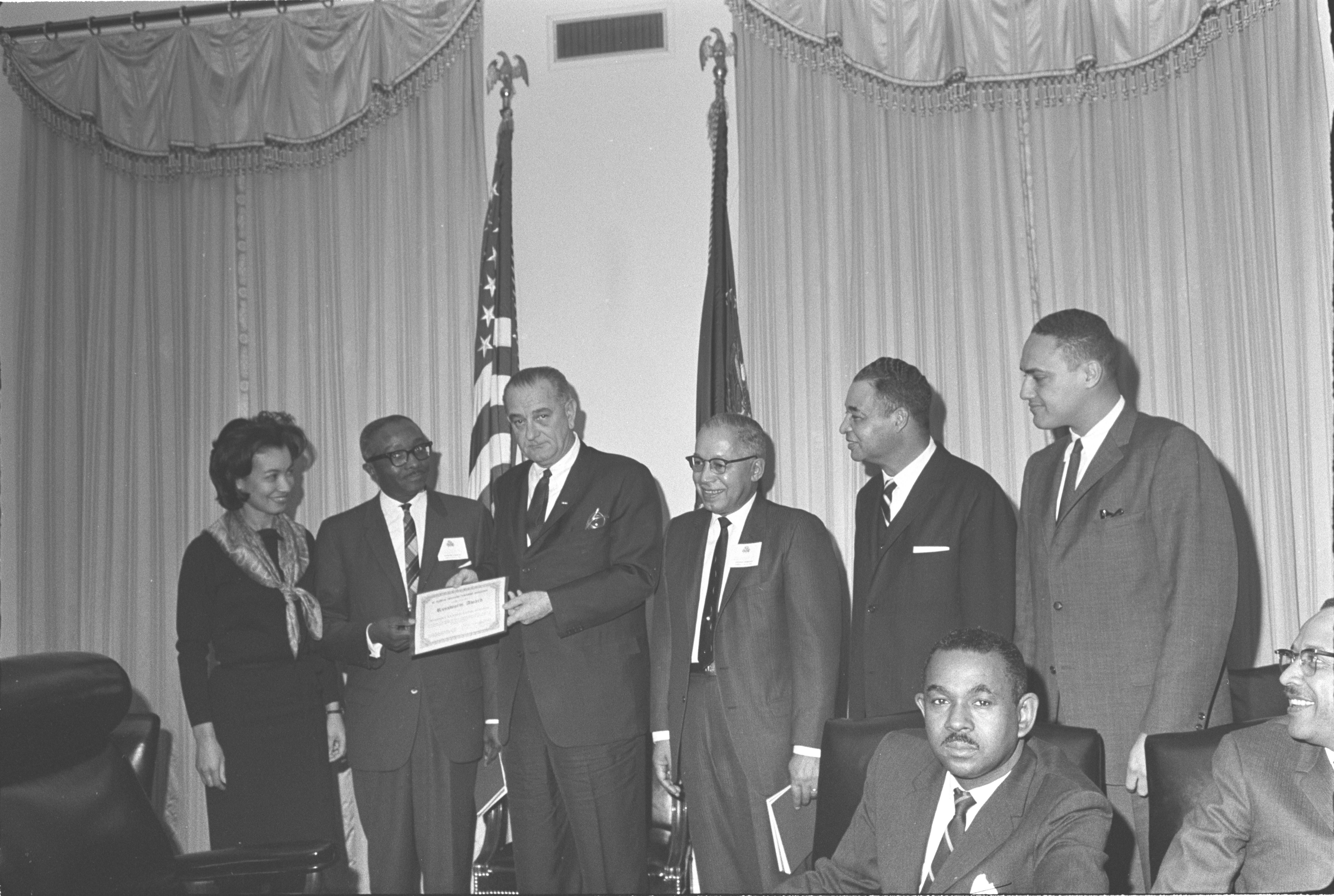
Lyndon Johnson meeting with NNPA members in 1965

"In 2000, the NNPA launched NNPA Media Services — a print and web advertising placement and press release distribution service." In 2014, Dr. Benjamin Chavis became the president and CEO of the organization.

== Black Press USA ==
In 2001, NNPA created an electronic news service, Black Press USA, which enables newspapers to provide real-time news and information to its national constituency. In 2003, Larry Muhammad reported for NeimanReports that Black Press USA "is a project of the Black Press Institute and handled by XIGroup, a Web development firm co-owned by Joy Bramble, publisher of The Baltimore Times, an NNPA member publication."

In 2019, Bill Cosby shared his support for Black Press USA and the black press in general.

== Membership ==
As of 2017, it said there were over 200 black newspapers in the country, saying that it was the largest resource available specifically for those papers.

As of 2023, the NNPA had listed a membership of more than 160 African American newspapers in the United States and the Virgin Islands on its website.
