= David Zurawik =

American journalist and writer (born 1949)

- Born: David Lee Zurawik; October 26, 1949 (age 76); Milwaukee, Wisconsin, U.S.
- Occupations: Journalist, writer, media critic

Academic background
- Education: University of Wisconsin–Madison (MA); University of Maryland, College Park (PhD)
- Doctoral advisor: Lawrence E. Mintz

Academic work
- Institutions: Goucher College
- Notable works: The Jews of Prime Time

David Lee Zurawik (born October 26, 1949) is an American journalist, writer, and professor. He was the TV and media critic at The Baltimore Sun from 1989 to his retirement in 2021 and is an assistant professor of practice in communications and media studies at Goucher College. Before that, Zurawik was a TV critic/columnist at the Dallas Times Herald. Zurawik is the author of The Jews of Prime Time.

== Early life and education ==
Zurawik was born to a Jewish family and earned a master's degree in specialized reporting from the University of Wisconsin–Madison and a doctorate in American studies from the University of Maryland, College Park. His dissertation in 2000 was titled The Jews of prime time: Ethnicity, self-censorship and assimilation in network television, 1949–1999. His doctoral advisor was Lawrence E. Mintz.

== Career ==
After completing graduate school, Zurawik first worked as a speech writer and press secretary for Wisconsin's Democratic lieutenant governor. He then worked as a reporter and critic for the Dallas Times Herald before joining The Baltimore Sun in 1989 as its television critic. His syndicated column ran in other newspapers, including the Los Angeles Times. In 2008, he became the lead writer for The Baltimore Sun TV blog, Z on TV. He has written pieces for the American Journalism Review. In 2017, he began writing articles for the Telegraph-Journal.

Zurawik worked for the Milwaukee Journal-Sentinel in the 1970s and the Detroit Free Press in the late-'70-s-early 80s, where he was a feature writer and TV critic.

Zurawik was a frequent guest on the CNN public affairs talk show Reliable Sources, and has also appeared on Fox News shows such as "Fox & Friends," "The O'Reilly Factor" and "On the Record with Greta Van Susteren."

Zurawik retired from The Baltimore Sun in 2021. He continues to teach at Goucher College in Towson, Maryland.

He is also an editor for SAGE Publications.

=== Books ===
Zurawik is the author of The Jews of Prime Time (2003). After that book was published, Zurawik reported that he was working on a biography of Gertrude Berg based on records stored at Syracuse University.

== Awards and honors ==
In 2015, Zurawik won the National Press Club's Arthur Rowse Award for Press Criticism in print.

Also in 2015, he was named a finalist in the Best Commentary category of the Mirror Awards, presented by Syracuse University's Newhouse School of Public Communications.

In 2016, he took home a first-place Excellence-in-Features award from the Society for Features Journalism in the Blog Portfolio category.

In 2017, he won another Arthur Rowse Award for press criticism, a National Press Club award.

In June 2017, he was given a third-place Arts & Entertainment award by the Society for Features Journalism.

In 2018, he won the Bart Richards Award for Media Criticism from Penn State University.
