= William Harrison Lowdermilk =

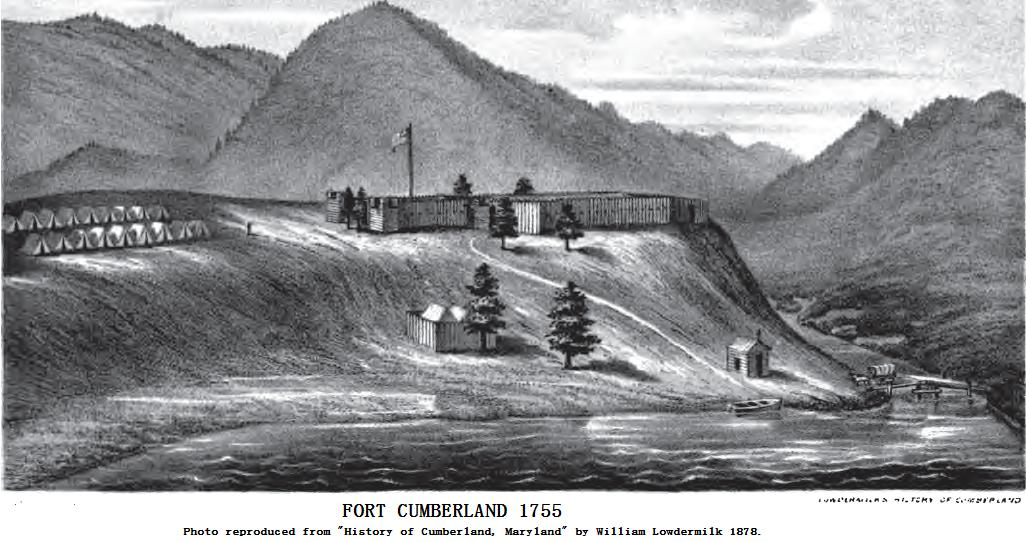
Fort Cumberland in 1755 as depicted in Lowdermilk's 1878 work, History of Cumberland.

William Harrison Lowdermilk (1839–1897) was a Union soldier, printer, and newspaper publisher.

== Biography ==
William Harrison Lowdermilk was born in Cumberland, Maryland on January 7, 1839. He moved to Louisville, Kentucky in 1850, attended college and learned the printing trade.

During the Civil War Lowdermilk enlisted in Company S, Kentucky 6th Infantry Regiment on 24 December 1861 and was promoted to Full Private on 1 May 1862. His obituary in the Evening Star states that he was an officer on General W. B. Hazen's staff. He was captured at the Battle of Stones River and held a prisoner of war in Libby Prison, Richmond for eight months, when he was exchanged, and then he rejoined his regiment and served with distinction until the close of the war, fighting at Shiloh, Chickamauga and Stone River.

In 1865, he purchased the newspaper the Civilian and Telegraph, a Cumberland newspaper made up of two previous papers, the Civilian and the Telegraph, and owned by Evans and Maupin. In May 1869, he established the Transcript, a daily newspaper which was published for three months, before it was abandoned, because of the ill health of the editor. Later that year he became the Cumberland Postmaster and an author of the History of Cumberland. The book was reviewed in the Evening Star in May 1896.

Lowdermilk moved to Washington, D.C. in 1878 and embarked in the book business as a member of the firm of James Anglim & Co. He later owned one of the largest book stores in the country, W.H. Lowdermilk & Co. Booksellers at 1424 F St., Washington D.C. He joined the Sons of the American Revolution on the grounds of the service of his ancestor Michael Kershner in Captain Graybill's Company on the Maryland Line during the American Revolution. Kershner had been stationed at Fort Cumberland. Lowdermilk attended meetings of the Sons of the Revolution in Washington, D.C.

He died in 1897, at age 80, in Washington D.C. and was buried in Rose Hill Cemetery, Cumberland.
