= Dorothy Sucher =

American journalist (1933–2010)

Dorothy Sucher (May 18, 1933 – August 22, 2010) was an American author and psychotherapist who worked as a reporter at the Greenbelt News Review, where an article that she wrote that quoted critics of a developers calling his plans "blackmail" initially resulted in a $17,500 judgement against the paper. The U.S. Supreme Court would later overturn the lower court verdict, ruling in Greenbelt Cooperative Publishing Assn. v. Bresler that the use of "rhetorical hyperbole" in such cases is covered by the First Amendment, a major victory that supported Freedom of the press in the United States.

She was born Dorothy Glassman on May 18, 1933, in Brooklyn, where she majored in English at Brooklyn College, graduating magna cum laude in 1954. She would later earn a master's degree in 1975 from Johns Hopkins University in mental health.

== Supreme Court case ==
Sucher worked as a reporter earning $5 a week for the Greenbelt News Review of Greenbelt, Maryland from 1959 to 1970, filling in as a columnist and associate editor. In that capacity she covered a 1965 city council hearing where developer Charles S. Bresler offered to sell a property the city wanted to acquire as long as he received the variances he was seeking on a development project, a deal that was described by members of the public attending the meeting as "blackmail", and Sucher reported these comments in her article on the meeting. Bresler filed suit in circuit court and a jury found in his favor, awarding him $17,500, a decision affirmed by the Maryland Court of Appeals. In 1970, the U.S. Supreme Court ruled 8–0 to overturn the lower court ruling, finding that "even the most careless reader must have perceived that the word was no more than rhetorical hyperbole", that "It is simply impossible to believe that a reader who reached the word 'blackmail' in either article would not have understood exactly what was meant" and that no reader would have interpreted the word in question to mean that Bresler had committed the criminal offense. To have ruled otherwise "would subvert the most fundamental meaning of a free press".

== Career ==
She would work as a psychotherapist with the Group Health Association from 1975 to 1980 and then went into private practice. As an author she wrote the mystery books Dead Men Don't Give Seminars in 1988 and Dead Men Don't Marry in 1989, followed by 1999's The Invisible Garden which was a collection of her essays. Her short stories were published in Mystery Readers Journal, Vermont Life and The Washington Post Magazine. Many years later she began to write a book about the News Review libel case, but was unable to find a publisher.

Sucher was active with the Sisters in Crime, an organization that aims to foster the development and recognition of female mystery writers. She worked as the treasurer for Sisters in Crime and later established a Mid-Atlantic chapter. She served in 1978 as state coordinator for the National Organization for Women (NOW), as part of her longstanding advocacy in support of women's rights. In the Northern Prince George's County Chapter of NOW, Sucher established and led the Consciousness Raising Program (1977-1980). She also became NOW's Maryland Consciousness Raising Coordinator, working to grow the program to other counties in Maryland. Sucher and her husband both served as delegates on the NOW State Council. She returned to the Greenbelt News Review in 1993, working there until 2004, including time spent as the paper's editor in chief.

In 1977, Sucher became an associate of the Women's Institute for Freedom of the Press (WIFP). WIFP is an American nonprofit publishing organization. The organization works to increase communication between women and connect the public with forms of women-based media.

Sucher taught creative writing at Georgetown University, Duke University, and the Writer's Center in Bethesda, Maryland.

Sucher was instrumental in formation of the Greenbelt Museum and served on its board of directors.

A resident of Silver Spring, Maryland, Sucher died at age 77 on August 22, 2010, at her home there due to thyroid cancer. She was survived by her husband Joseph, as well as by two sons and a granddaughter.
