= The Baltimore County Union =

Defunct newspaper in Maryland, US

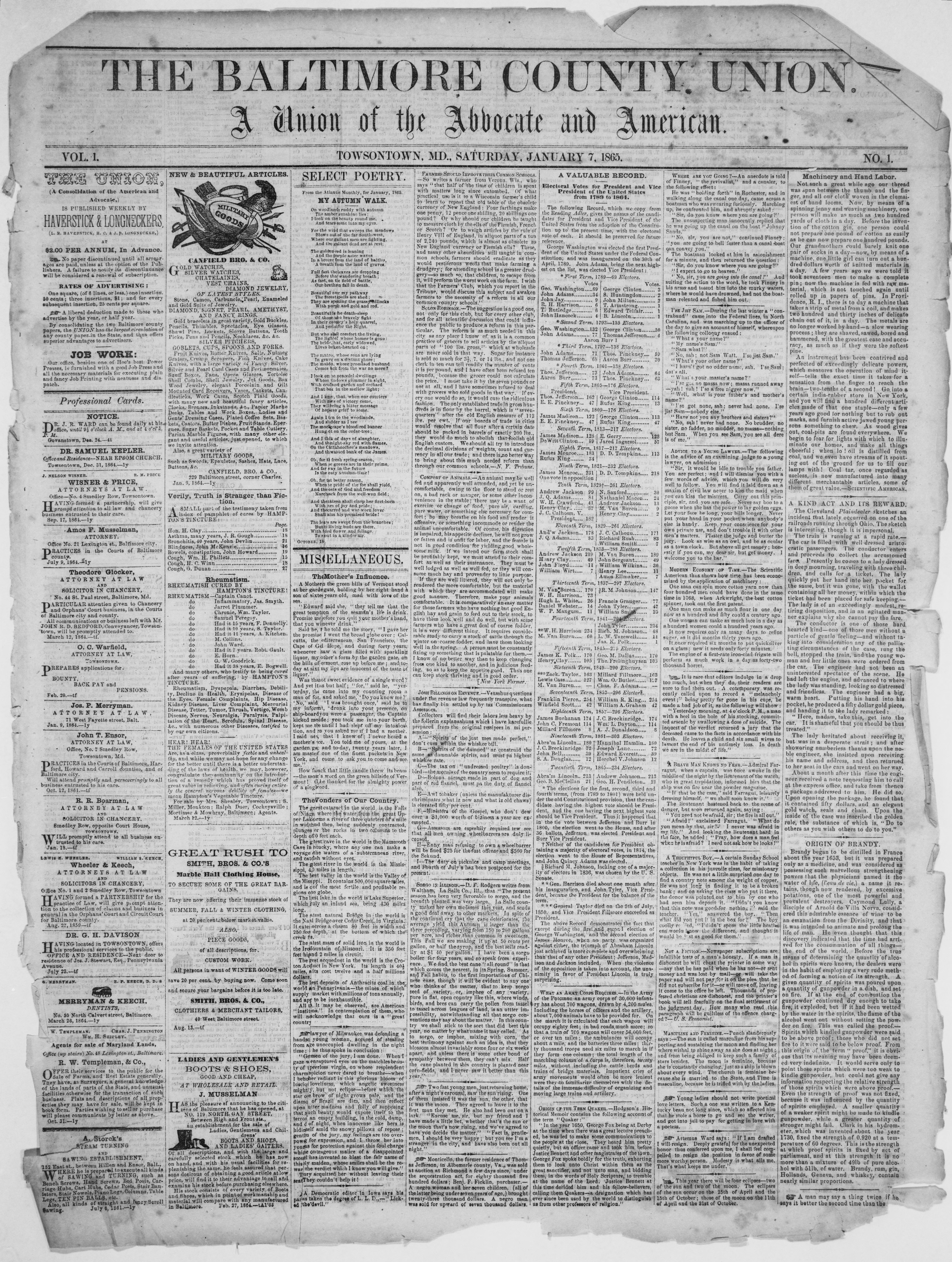
- The cover page of the January 7, 1865 inaugural issue of The Baltimore County Union
- Type: Weekly newspaper
- Founder(s): John H. Longnecker
- Publisher: Henry C. & John B. Longnecker
- Founded: January 7, 1865
- Political alignment: Republican
- Ceased publication: June 8, 1912
- Headquarters: Towson, Maryland
- OCLC number: 9789512

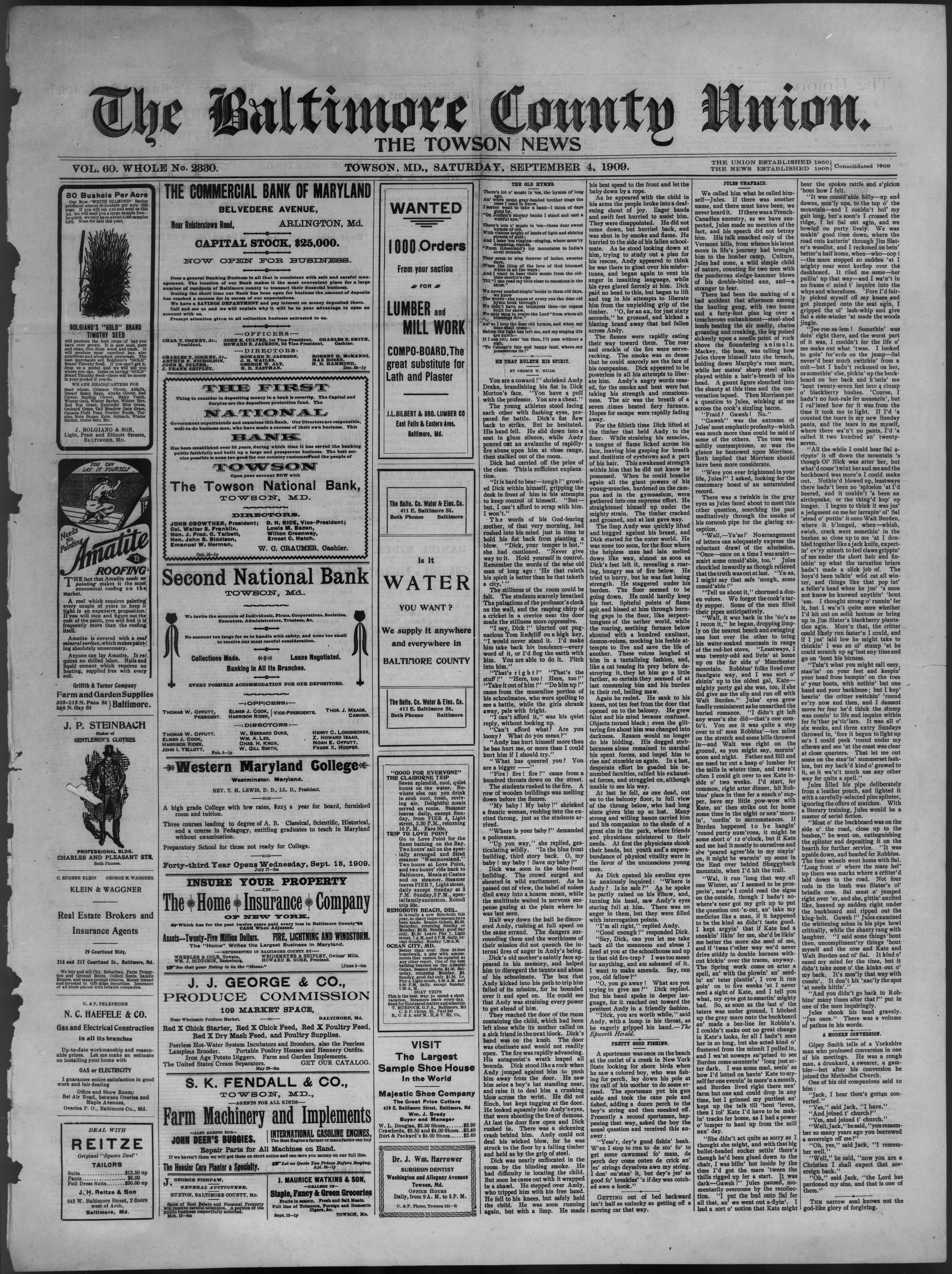
The cover page of an issue of the paper when it went under the title, "The Baltimore County Union, the Towson News."

The Baltimore County Union was a weekly newspaper published in Towsontown, Baltimore, Maryland from January 7, 1865 to June 8, 1912. When John H. Longnecker combined his pro-Union paper, the Baltimore County American, with the Baltimore County Advocate to create The Baltimore County Union, he placed his sons Henry and John in charge of the new weekly. Its inaugural issue claimed that it had the "largest circulation of any county paper in the State." The publication's main competitor in Towsontown was the Maryland Journal, a Democratic paper run by William H. Ruby.

Henry C. and John B. Longnecker, along with a schoolteacher named L.M. Haverstick, ran the paper for a few years before Haverstick's departure, after which they acquired full ownership of the publication. John died on March 1, 1909, and Henry consolidated the paper with the Towson News a few months later, forming the Union News and eventually retiring soon after. The new publication operated out of the old Towson News offices, a large two-story building located in Towson.

The Baltimore County Union was openly supportive of the Republican party and endorsed its candidates at local, state, and national levels. During the early 1870s, the paper wrote extensively about the passage of the 15th Constitutional Amendment, an example of the publication's dedication to covering civil rights issues as well as a reflection of the significant local population of African Americans.
