= Greenbelt Cooperator =

Defunct weekly newspaper in Greenbelt, Maryland, US

- Front page of the Greenbelt Cooperator on December 19, 1941
- Type: Weekly newspaper
- Founder: Louis Bessemer
- Publisher: Greenbelt Consumer Services, Inc.
- Editor: Louis Bessemer, William R. Poole
- Founded: 24 November 1937
- Ceased publication: 16 September 1954
- Headquarters: Greenbelt, Maryland
- ISSN: 2577-0071
- OCLC number: 19952288

The Greenbelt Cooperator was a weekly newspaper published in Greenbelt, Maryland, United States, from 1937 to 1954 by a then-sitting mayor, Louis Bessemer. Today, the newspaper is published under the name Greenbelt News Review.

== History ==
Under the banner Greenbelt Cooperator, the paper's first issue was published on November 24, 1937. In its inaugural issue, publisher Bessemer outlined the paper's mission statement which included a politically neutral stance.

The original newspaper had a staff of 19 people. The paper changed its name to Greenbelt News Review in 1954.

The paper's history was tumultuous in its early years and "changed hands rapidly," exemplified by a staff member's observation that "more often than not, the morning sun shone on the faces of the amateur journalists as they trudged home from 'putting the paper to bed.'"

In January 1938, the paper had completed its trial period and officially elected a new editor, William R. Poole, as well as a board of directors.

== Change to Greenbelt News Review ==
The Cooperator changed its name in September 1954, with an explanation from editor Harry M. Zubkoff, who would eventually serve as editor four times throughout the 1950s and 1960s: "There are a number of 'Cooperators' published throughout the country...and this has added an element of confusion. [...] While we are concerned with publishing news of local interest, we are also concerned with selling what we publish, and the feeling is inescapable that we have encountered some sales resistance in trying to sell the 'Cooperator.'" However, it has been argued that the name change was part of an effort to distance the publication from communist ideals as a response to "changing beliefs in the nation as a whole."

Heather Elizabeth Peterson argues, "The newspaper, from the start, was a quiet propaganda tool for promoting cooperatives," and also that "Communism was an increasing threat, and the United States government had lost interest in cooperative experiments."
