= Western Maryland Democrat =

Defunct weekly newspaper published in Westminster, Maryland, US

- Type: Weekly newspaper
- Founder: Joseph Shaw
- Publisher: W. Scott Roberts
- Founded: 1863
- Ceased publication: April 13, 1865
- Relaunched: November 30, 1865. The Democratic Advocate
- Language: English
- Headquarters: Westminster, Maryland
- OCLC number: 19017395

The Western Maryland Democrat was a weekly newspaper published from March 1863 to April 13, 1865 in Westminster, Maryland. The paper's equipment and premises were destroyed by an angry mob in April 1865 in the wake of the assassination of Abraham Lincoln, and a few weeks later the paper's founder, Joseph Shaw, was attacked and murdered. Jesse Glass has written extensively on Joseph Shaw and his murder. The Democrat's successor, The Democratic Advocate, literally rose from its ashes when William H. Davis established the paper in November 1865.
