= The Frostburg Forum =

Defunct weekly newspaper in Maryland, US

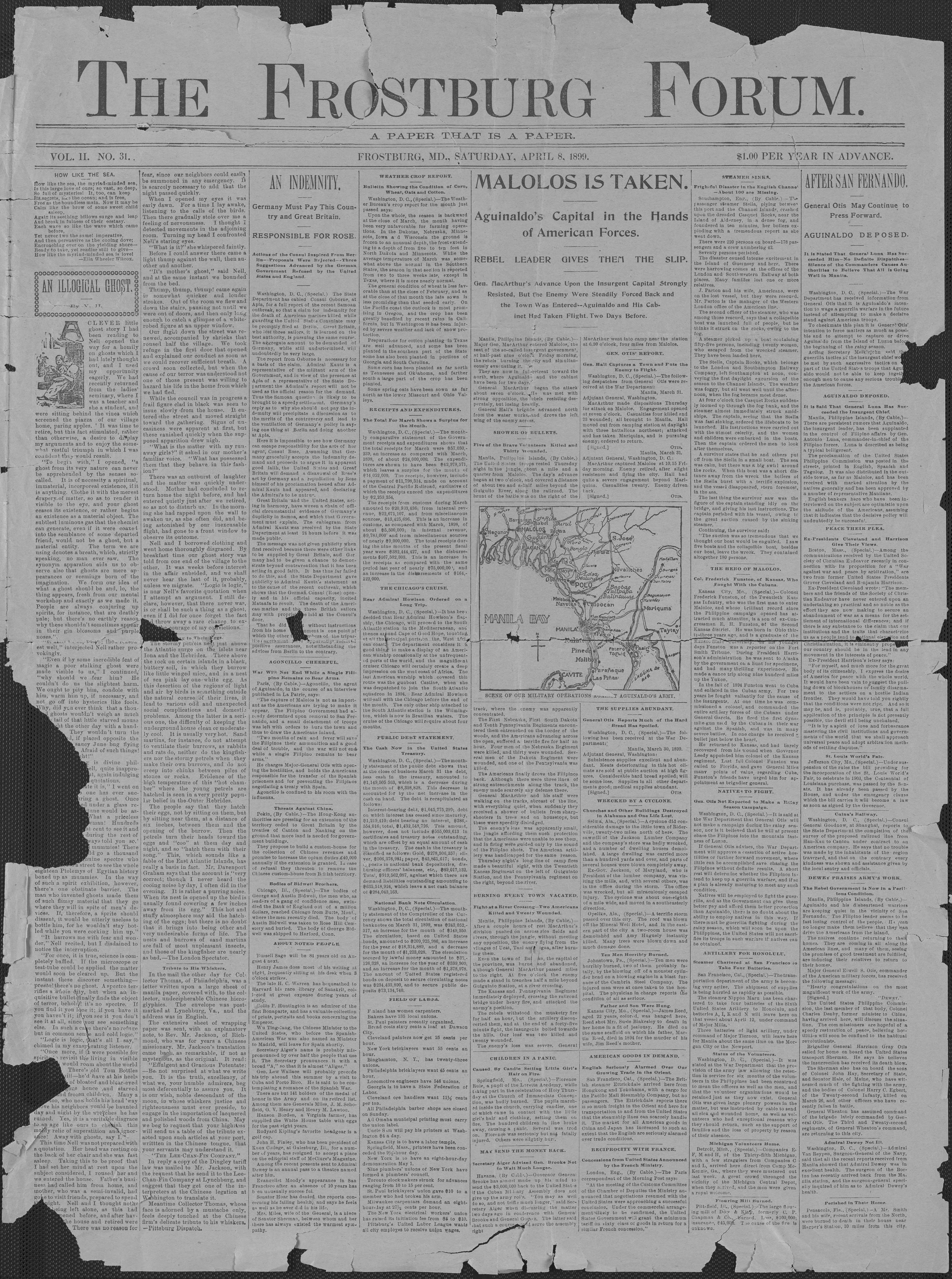
- The cover page of the August 8, 1899 issue
- Type: Weekly newspaper
- Founder(s): John B. Williams, Henry Francis Cook
- Publisher: Forum Publishing Co.
- Editor: George T. Goshorn (1897-1901), N. Ralph Moore (1901)
- Founded: 1897
- Political alignment: Republican
- Ceased publication: 1901
- Headquarters: Frostburg, Maryland, U.S.
- OCLC number: 22171098

The Frostburg Forum was a weekly newspaper published in Frostburg, Maryland, U.S. from 1897 to 1901. It was founded by John B. Williams and Henry Francis Cook, who had joined to form the Forum Publishing Co. Cook had already began publication of another newspaper, The Frostburg News, earlier that same year, and would subsequently go on to publish The Frostburg Gleaner in 1899. The paper was initially edited by George T. Goshorn, a veteran newspaperman who had previously published newspapers in West Virginia in addition to working for the Government Printing Office in Washington, D.C. By 1901, the Forum had been purchased by the Frostburg Home Building and Conveyance Company and was edited and published by its manager, N. Ralph Moore. The Forum ceased publication that same year, however, with Moore going on to edit the Linton Record.

Under both Goshorn and Moore, The Frostburg Forum set itself in political opposition to Frostburg's other main newspaper, the Democratic-leaning Frostburg Mining Journal. The Forum supported local, state, and national Republican party candidates and maintained a pro-business stance, which did not sit well with some readers. In the paper's June 8, 1901 issue, Moore described an altercation he had with a "prominent Frostburger" who objected to some of the views expressed in the Forum: "We attempted to offer an explanation, but wound up by calling him a liar--and then the fun(?) commenced. We inserted his hands in our hair, our thumb in his mouth, drew him down on the ground on top of us and proceeded to clean him up about right...If there are any more who want a slice, let them apply at 9:30 next Monday night, when we hope our thumb will be in condition for further chewing." Aside from this incident, the Forum was a typical weekly newspaper with coverage of local events in addition to national and international news coverage.
