= Maryland Suffrage News =

Defunct weekly newspaper in Maryland, US

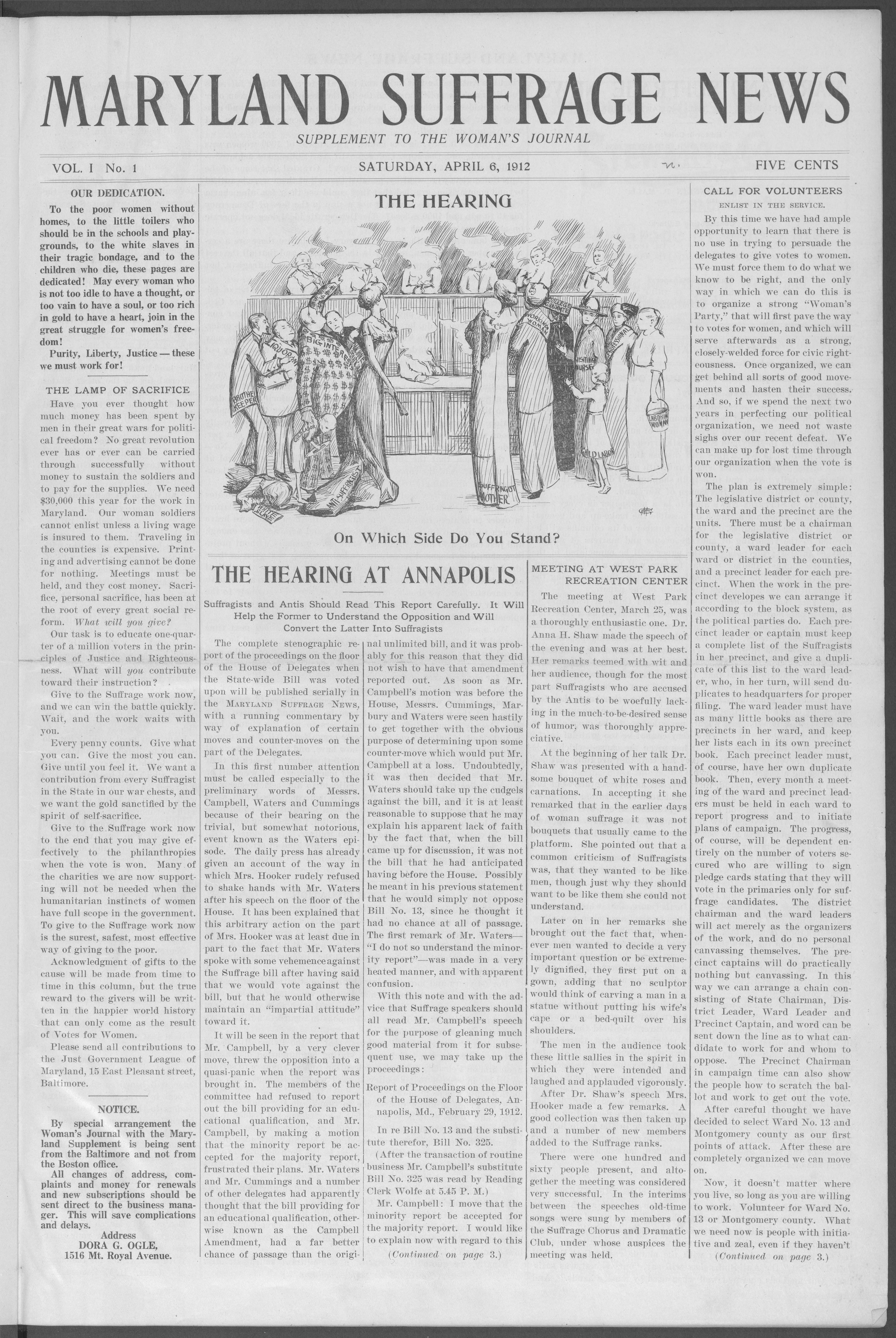
- The cover page of the April 6, 1912 inaugural issue of Maryland Suffrage News
- Type: Weekly newspaper
- Founder(s): Edith Houghton Hooker
- Founded: 1912
- Ceased publication: 1920
- Headquarters: Baltimore, Maryland
- OCLC number: 20738164

The Maryland Suffrage News was a weekly newspaper founded in Baltimore, Maryland in 1912 by Edith Houghton Hooker as the voice of the Just Government League (JGL) of Maryland, a pro-women's suffrage organization that she founded in 1909. Hooker was the editor of the paper and Dora G. Ogle was the business manager, while Hooker and her husband, Donald R. Hooker, provided the main financial backing. Members of the National American Women's Suffrage Association (NAWSA) could subscribe to the national Woman’s Journal (Boston) and the Maryland Suffrage News at the same time, but the Maryland Suffrage News also was available by separate subscriptions. Eventually, the JGL affiliated with the National Woman's Party, a group that advocated for suffrage via congressional amendment, a stance that led to its withdrawal from the NAWSA.

== History ==
The first issue of the Maryland Suffrage News was published on April 6, 1912. The newspaper quickly became the voice of the white women's suffrage movement in Maryland, since other general circulation newspapers, such as the Baltimore Sun and local papers, did not always publish or pay attention to news related to suffrage. While the majority of subscribers lived in Maryland, the paper had a national reputation with readers in Virginia, Pennsylvania, Delaware, New York, and California. The audience for the paper was primarily middle- and upper-class white women and their supporters.

Even though the JGL published the newspaper and promoted more radical political views that were in line with Edith Hooker's own beliefs, the Maryland Suffrage News served to build a community among various woman's suffrage interests from beyond and across the state, and promote a statewide women's suffrage movement. The Maryland Suffrage News regularly printed news and information from other suffrage organizations, such as the Maryland Women's Suffrage League and the State Franchise League, as well as local suffrage leagues regardless of their state or national suffrage affiliations. The newspaper presented news, information, editorials, and images of the suffrage movement on the local, state, and national levels. The Maryland Suffrage News functioned not only as an educational resource for women readers, but also as a motivational force by providing practical tips on how to organize and debate the suffrage amendment. Historian Diane Weaver writes, "Suffrage News editors early on developed a 'Speakers Class,' and devoted columns to train suffrage advocates to speak on the connection between home, activism, and suffrage."

When the Nineteenth Amendment to the United States Constitution was ratified in 1920, the Maryland Suffrage News ceased publication. The Maryland Suffrage News advocated for the formation of the Maryland League of Women Voters, which was organized in 1921 and soon thereafter began to publish the Maryland Voter. Edith Houghton Hooker also became the editor of the National Woman's Party journal, The Suffragist, beginning in 1917 and then later the publication Equal Rights until 1934.
