= The Frostburg Gleaner =

Defunct weekly newspaper in Maryland, US

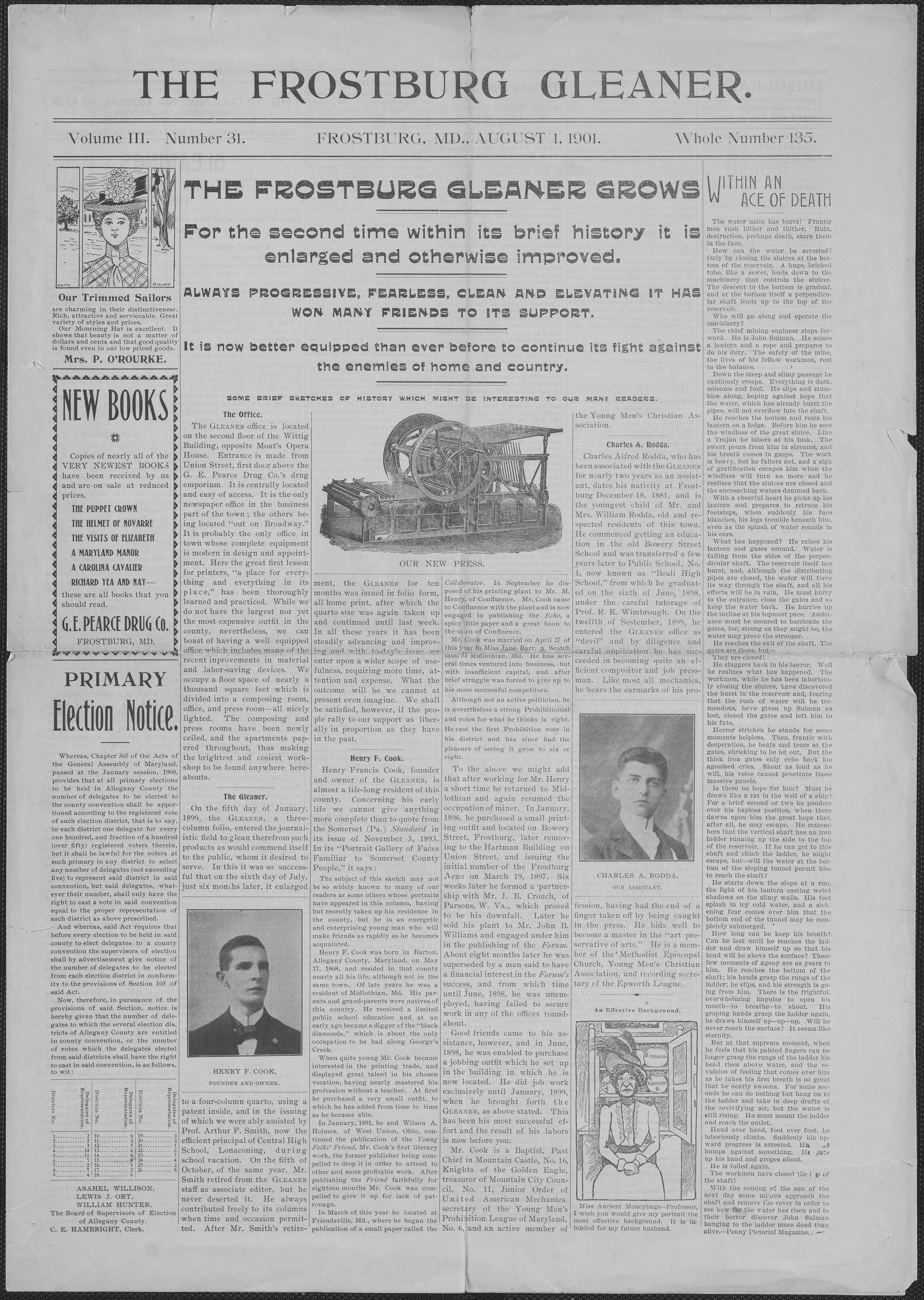
- The cover page of the August 1, 1901 issue
- Type: Weekly newspaper
- Founder(s): Henry Francis Cook
- Publisher: Henry Francis Cook
- Editor: Henry Francis Cook
- Founded: 1899
- Ceased publication: 1901
- Headquarters: Frostburg, Maryland, U.S.
- OCLC number: 22171127

The Frostburg Gleaner was a weekly newspaper that was published from 1899 to 1901 in Frostburg, Maryland, U.S. It was founded by Henry Francis Cook, who acted as editor and publisher for the paper's short existence. Cook had previously established The Frostburg Forum and The Frostburg News in 1897, and had also published the Friendsville Collaborator in nearby Friendsville, Maryland. After leaving the Forum shortly after its inception, Cook worked as a job printer until he started the Gleaner.

Cook supported the prohibition of alcohol, and this was reflected in the Gleaner's banner, which read, "An Independent Prohibition Weekly." A recurring feature of the paper was its "Gleanings" section, which collected "items of interest culled from various sources for the delectation of friends of the cause," which were typically articles warning of the evils of alcohol consumption and promoting the activities of local prohibition groups. In 1900, Cook appears to have written to a technical journal for printers called The Inland Printer, which offered criticism and advice to newspaper owners by request. The Inland Printer told Cook, "There is nothing to criticise about your paper. It is a newsy little weekly, nicely printed." However, the paper's quality was not enough to keep the Gleaner afloat; its narrow focus on prohibition did not prove financially successful, and Cook closed the paper in 1901.
