= Baltimore Commercial Journal and Lyford's Price-Current =

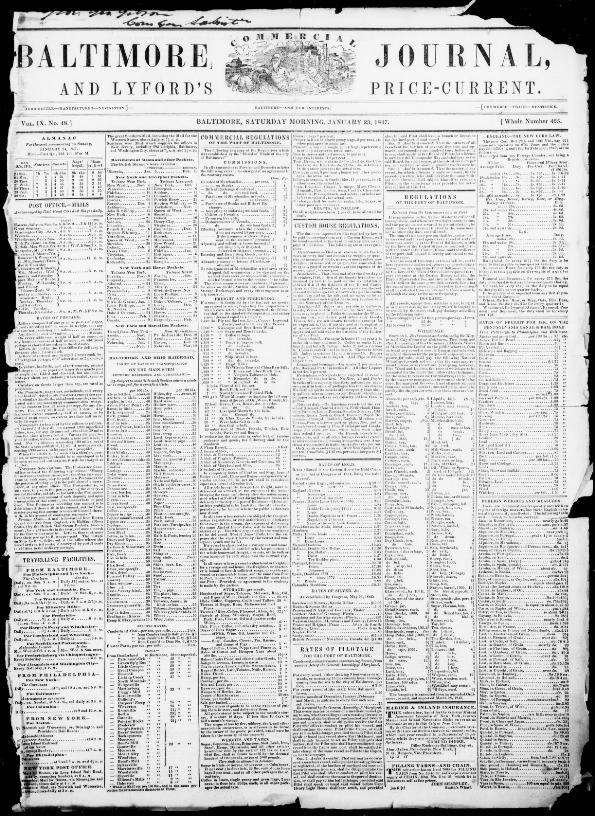
- Front page of the January 23, 1847, issue of the Baltimore Commercial Journal, and Lyford's Price-Current.
- Type: Daily newspaper
- Format: Broadsheet
- Founded: 1840; 185 years ago
- Ceased publication: 1849

The Baltimore Commercial Journal and Lyford's Price-Current was a weekly business newspaper published in Baltimore, Maryland, between 1840 and 1849. Printed by William G. Lyford, the paper was a revival of the defunct Baltimore Price Current. It was succeeded by the Baltimore Price-Current and Weekly Journal of Commerce.

A price current is a business newspaper giving up-to-date prices of commodities and shipping news. The Baltimore Price-Current, the first such publication in Baltimore, was founded by Joseph Escavaille, the proprietor of a coffeehouse (Baltimore Exchange Reading Rooms) serving shopkeepers and businessmen. The Price-Current was published from 1803 until shortly after Escavaille's death in 1828.

After Escavaille's death, Baltimore Price-CurrentIt underwent several title changes. It was renamed the Baltimore Weekly Price Current in 1805 and the Baltimore Price Current in 1830. William G. Lyford revived the Price Current, now called Lyford's Price Current, on March 3, 1838. The paper was renamed Lyford's Baltimore Price Current in 1839 and the Baltimore Commercial Journal, and Lyford's Price-Current in 1840.

Each issue was four pages long. It contained shipping news (arrivals and departures of boats and trains), a marine list (passengers of ships entering and leaving Baltimore), and Port of Baltimore rules and regulations. The paper also contained rates and prices included in the paper covered stocks, wholesale merchandise, postage, and data reprinted from other exchanges. The paper also printed short reviews of markets for the previous week. Lyford retired in 1849 and sold the paper to George U. Porter and Thomas W. Tobin.

Porter and Tobin began publishing the Baltimore Price-Current and Weekly Journal of Commerce on June 29, 1850. In 1882, an industrial news and intelligence section was added to the paper, which was renamed the Journal of Commerce and Manufacturers Record. The Journal and Record were split that same year and continued to be edited and published separately. The Journal of Commerce and Price-Current was sold to and subsumed by the Manufacturers Record upon Porter's death in summer 1886. The Record continued publication until 1928.
