= Matthias Bartgis =

American Printer

Matthias Bartgis (1759–1825) was a pioneer American printer in western Maryland, Virginia, and Pennsylvania.

== Biography ==
Matthias Bartgis was born June 3, 1759, in Lancaster, Pennsylvania, to a German immigrant, Matthias Bartgis. He learned the art of printing from William Bradford in Philadelphia and initially established a print office in York, Pennsylvania. In 1778 he expanded his business to Frederick, Maryland, and later to Winchester, Virginia, as well. In 1788 Bartgis established a regular bi-weekly private mail system which stretched from York to Winchester to facilitate the delivery of his paper.

Until his retirement in 1820 Bartgis published various newspapers, pamphlets, forms, and books for the rapidly growing population of the Shenandoah, bringing printed culture to the area and including the large German minority.

His newspaper publications include:

- 1785–1789. Bartgis’s Marylandische Zeitung, Fredericktown, Md.
- 1786–1788. Maryland Chronicle, Fredericktown, Md.
- 1787–1788. Pennsylvania Chronicle, York, Pa.
- 1787–1791. Virginia Gazette, Winchester, Va.
- 1789. Maryland Gazette, Fredericktown, Md.
- 1790. Staunton Gazette, Staunton, Va.
- 1792–1794. Bartgis’s Maryland Gazette, Fredericktown, Md.
- 1793. General Staats-Bothe, Fredericktown, Md.
- 1794–1800. Bartgis’s Federal Gazette, Fredericktown, Md.
- 1800–1820+. Bartgis’s Republican Gazette, Fredericktown, Md.
- 1802–1806, 1809–1810, 1813–1814. Hornet, Fredericktown, Md.
- 1808. Independent American Volunteer, Fredericktown, Md.
- 1810–1813. General Staatsbothe, Fredericktown, Md.
