= Baltimore County Advocate =

Defunct newspaper in Maryland, US

- Type: Weekly newspaper
- Founder(s): Eleazer F. Church
- Founded: February 24, 1850
- Ceased publication: December 31, 1864
- Headquarters: Baltimore, Maryland
- OCLC number: 9470534

The Baltimore County Advocate was a weekly newspaper published in Towsontown, Baltimore, Maryland from February 24, 1850 to December 31, 1864. It was founded by Eleazer F. Church, who had previous experience as a printer for the Doylestown Democrat, and started the Advocate in order to promote the municipal separation of Baltimore County and Baltimore city as well as African American emancipation. The paper's headquarters was relocated from Baltimore to Towson, the new county seat, in 1853. Church sold the paper in 1865 to Henry C. Longnecker and his brother John, who renamed the publication to The Baltimore County Union.
