= Civilian & Telegraph =

Defunct weekly newspaper in Cumberland, Maryland, US

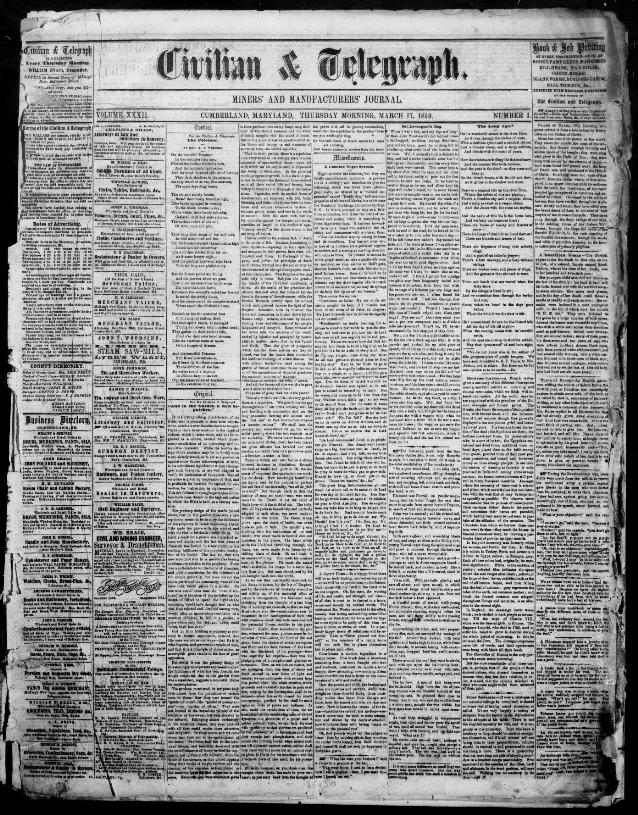
- The front page of the first issue of the Cumberland Civilian & Telegraph, March 17, 1859.
- Type: Daily newspaper
- Format: Broadsheet
- Owner(s): Baltimore Sun Media Group/Tribune Publishing
- Editor: William Evans; John J. Maupin
- Founded: March 17, 1859
- Political alignment: Conservatism; Southern Unionism
- Ceased publication: 1905
- Headquarters: Cumberland, Maryland

The Civilian & Telegraph was a Unionist newspaper published weekly in Cumberland, Maryland, from 1859 to 1905. It was created on March 17, 1859, from the merger of two newspapers, the Civilian and Telegraph. William Evans and John J. Maupin were the first editors.

== History ==
=== Civilian ===
The Civilian was a weekly newspaper established on February 14, 1828, by Samuel Charles. The name of the newspaper was chosen to indicate that the paper did not support the candidacy of military man Andrew Jackson in the 1828 presidential election. Instead, the paper supported "The Great Commoner" and Secretary of State Henry Clay.

On April 14, 1833, a fire burnt down much of Cumberland, including the offices of the Civilian and the Cumberland Advocate. The account books of the Civilian were the only objects recovered from the office afterwards. By July 1833, the Civilian offices had been rebuilt beneath the Cumberland Bank on Mechanic Street. From 1833 through 1840 the paper was known as the Phoenix Civilian.

On November 6, 1846, Archibald Carey purchased the Civilian and also assumed the role of editor. Under Carey's ownership, the paper continued to support the Whig party, which can be traced back to the paper's support of Clay.

Several years later in 1852, H. W. Hoffman purchased a half interest in the paper and became Carey's associate editor.

=== Telegraph ===
The Cumberland Telegraph was a weekly newspaper established in 1851 by Hilleary & Ogden. In 1853, Aza Beall bought both men's share in the paper and became its sole editor and proprietor.

== Merger ==
On March 17, 1858, the Cumberland Telegraph and Maryland Mining Register (formerly the Telegraph) merged with the Cumberland Miners' Journal (formerly the Civilian) to create the Civilian & Telegraph.

During the Civil War, the politics of the Civilian & Telegraph were conservative and firmly Unionist. The paper became associated with the Unconditional Union Party in 1861. On July 1, 1865, the Civilian & Telegraph was purchased by Will H. Lowdermilk.

Lowdermilk eventually sold his share of the paper to the Civilian Publishing Company.

== Politics ==
The politics of the Civilian & Telegraph shifted based on the affiliation of its owners. At the time of the merger, the newspaper was Whig in its politics, as its predecessor the Civilian had been. After its purchase by Lowdermilk, it became a Republican paper.

The Civilian & Telegraph endorsed the Constitutional Union Party in the 1860 elections.

The paper, among others such as the Baltimore American, the Baltimore Clipper, the Baltimore County Advocate, and the Frederick Examiner, denounced southern sympathizers and secession.
