= Hammond Gazette =

Civil War hospital newspaper

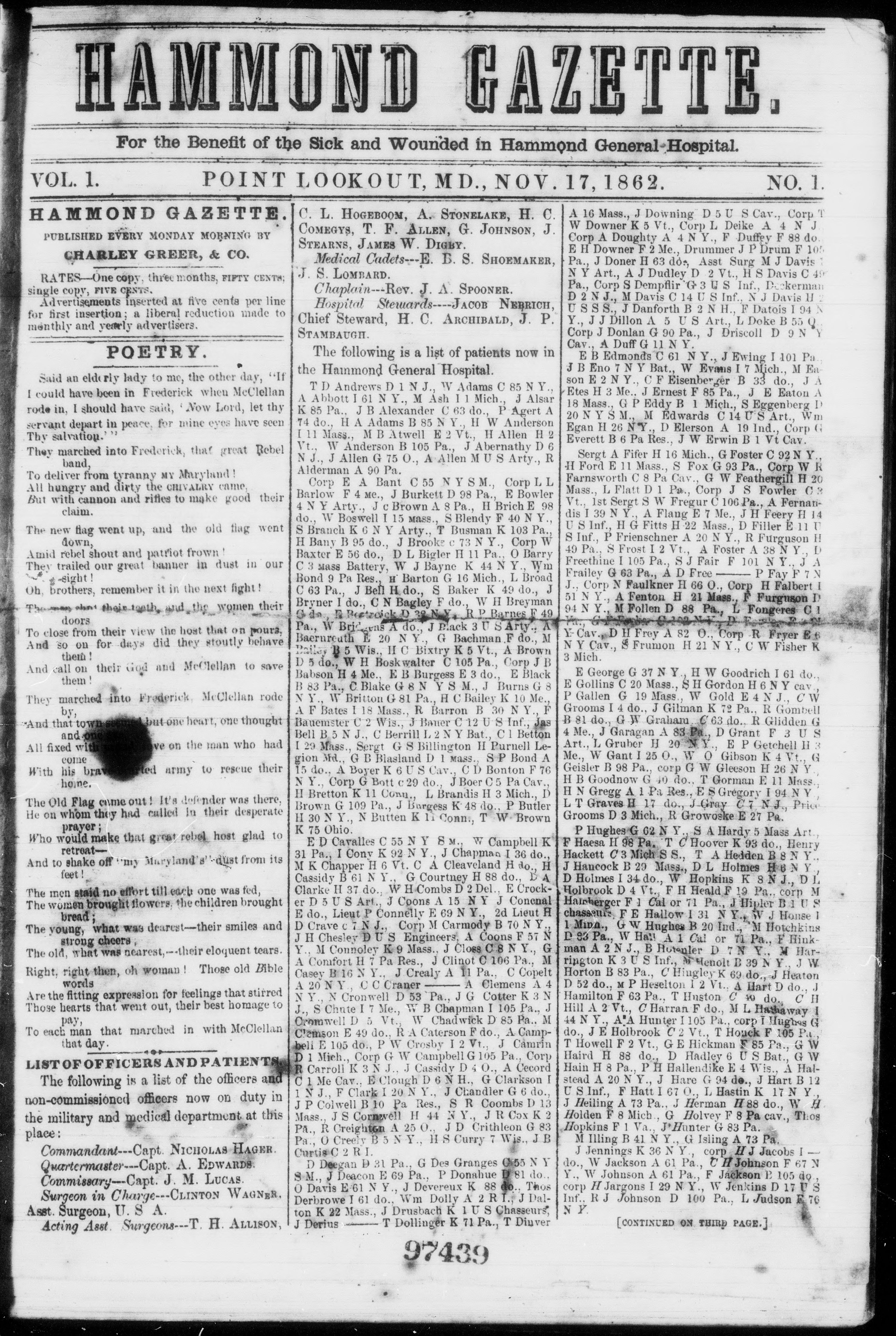
- The November 17, 1862, cover page of the inaugural issue of the Hammond Gazette
- Publisher: Charley Greer & Co.
- Founded: November 17, 1862
- City: Point Lookout, Maryland
- OCLC number: 8254980

The Hammond Gazette was a weekly newspaper that was first published on November 17, 1862 in Point Lookout, Maryland. The paper was initially published by Charley Greer. George Everett, White Commander of Company D in the 38th United States Colored Troops (USCT) stationed at Point lookout, eventually succeeded him and published the paper for the majority of its run.

== Publication ==
The Gazette was created for the staff and patients of Hammond General Hospital, a military facility at Point Lookout during the Civil War. The paper took its name from the hospital where it was printed, which was in turn named for Surgeon General William A. Hammond. It served to treat the wounded of both sides of the war, but later also served as a prison camp for confederate prisoners in the aftermath of the Battle of Gettysburg.

It was the first paper to be issued during the Civil War from a military hospital. In 1955, its remaining issues were described as composing the largest file of record for military hospital newspapers, containing 95 issues from November 17, 1862, to September 7, 1864. There were a total of 19 military hospital newspapers during the Civil War, five of which were published in or around the Washington, D.C., area.

The paper contained poetry, humor, war news, current events, local news, lists of those in the hospital, and fiction—including a number of pieces about President Abraham Lincoln—among other topics. It served as a way for those recuperating at the hospital to maintain a connection with the world around them. Many patients would send clippings of the paper to their friends and family as ways of keeping them informed. It was also a political instrument, which derided the copperhead—anti-war Democrats—as "a professional growler" and complainer, and called for increased political violence against Southerners in the war.

While the hospital at one point had some 1900 patients, the number dropped to a couple hundred over time, and creative writing became the bulk of its issues. It contained only modest amounts of advertising, and reported on Lincoln's July 28, 1863, visit to Point Lookout.
