= Worcester Democrat =

Former weekly newspaper in Worcester County, MD, US

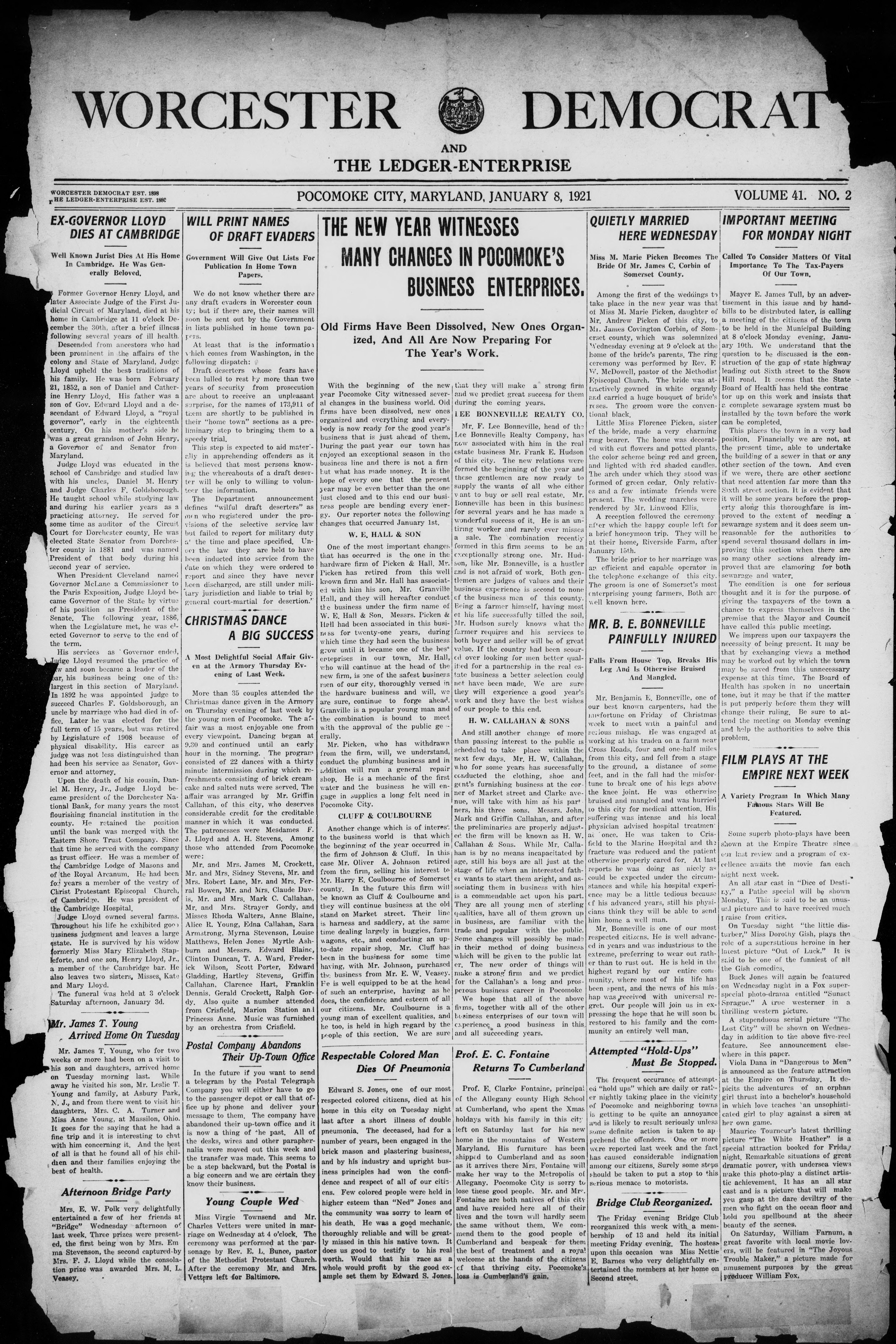
- Cover page of the January 8, 1921 issue of the Worcester Democrat
- Type: Weekly newspaper
- Founder: Samuel M. Crockett
- Founded: 1898
- Ceased publication: February 2, 1973
- Relaunched: March 1973, as Worcester County Messenger
- Headquarters: Snow Hill, Maryland
- OCLC number: 20135210

The Worcester Democrat was a weekly newspaper published from 1898 to February 22, 1973, in Pocomoke City, Worcester County, Maryland. It was founded by Samuel M. Crockett, a Democratic politician who served in the Maryland House of Delegates for two terms, 1920–1922. Crockett had learned the newspaper business as a young man working at the Somerset Herald in Princess Anne, Maryland, and was also owner of another local paper, the Peninsula-Ledger. In January 1921, the publication changed its name to the Worcester Democrat and the Ledger-Enterprise after it absorbed the successor of the Peninsula-Ledger, the Ledger-Enterprise. This remained the title until September 24, 1953, when it was changed back to its original Worcester Democrat. On March 1, 1973, the Democrat merged with nearby Snow Hill's Democratic Messenger to form the Worcester County Messenger. This newspaper remained in publication until at least 1980.

The Democrat reported mostly on local industry and events, with the yearly Pocomoke Fair running from 1901 to 1917 becoming an anticipated event. On October 17, 1933, the paper reported on the lynching of a local man by a mob in Princess Anne; this would be the last known lynching in Maryland.
