= The Frostburg News =

Defunct weekly paper in Maryland, US

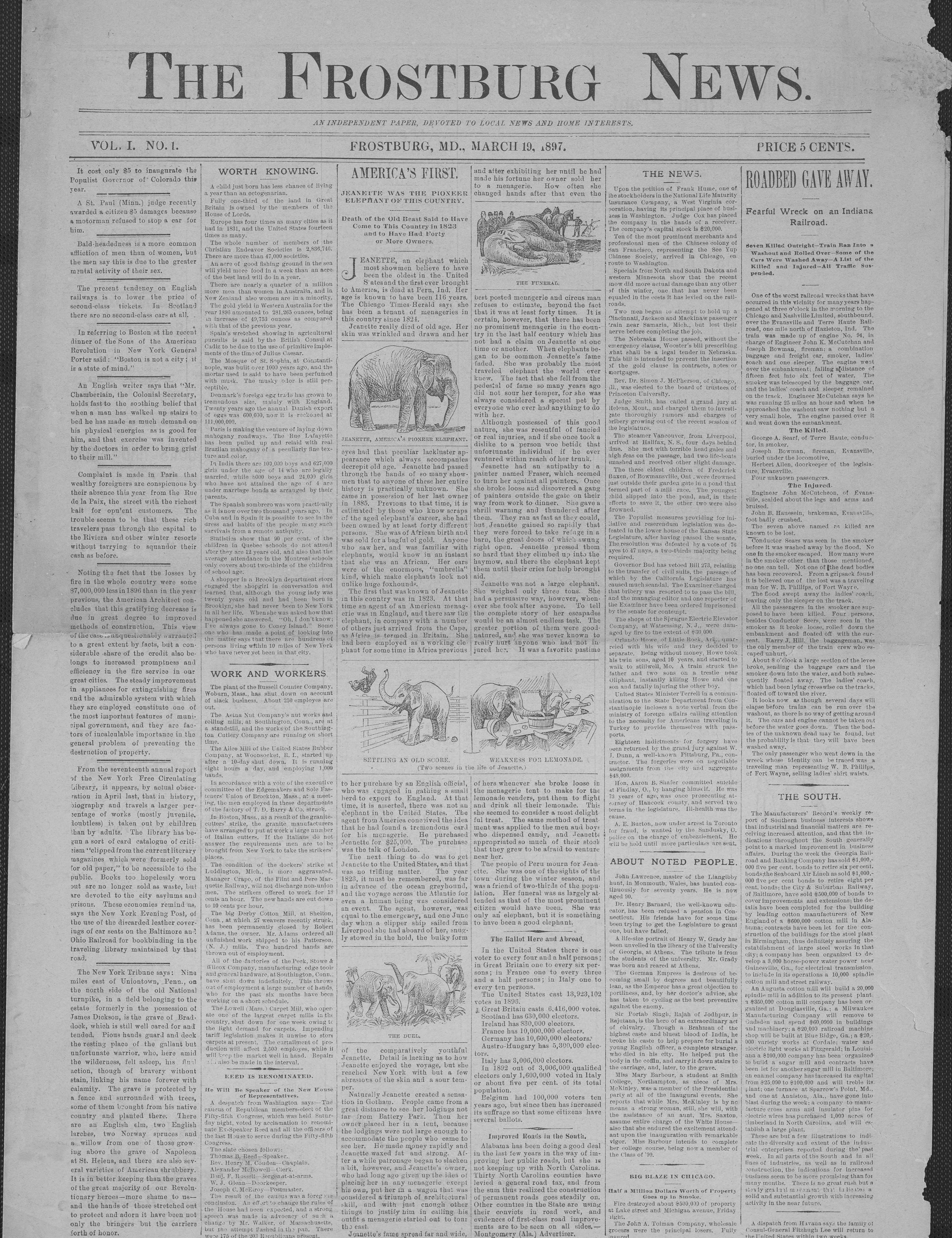
- The cover page of the March 19, 1897 inaugural issue
- Type: Weekly newspaper
- Founder(s): Henry Francis Cook
- Editor: Henry Francis Cook
- Founded: March 19, 1897
- Ceased publication: April 1897
- Headquarters: Frostburg, Maryland, U.S.
- OCLC number: 22171215

The Frostburg News was a weekly paper that was published from March 19, 1897, to April 1897 in Frostburg, Maryland, U.S. It was published by Henry Francis Cook, who would go on to publish The Frostburg Forum with John B. Williams later that same year; Cook also published The Frostburg Gleaner from 1899 to 1901. In the News' inaugural issue, Cook promised "never to imitate" the "mud-slinging" tendencies of other publications, telling readers that his paper was "the organ of no political party, creed or sect." Though Cook announced his acquisition of a new printing press in April 1897 that would allow expansion of the paper to an eight-column format (which was "two columns more than [its] local contemporary"), the newspaper would only publish a few more issues before ceasing altogether. This was presumably due to Cook joining forces with Williams to begin publishing the Forum.
