= The Frostburg Spirit =

Defunct weekly newspaper in Maryland, US

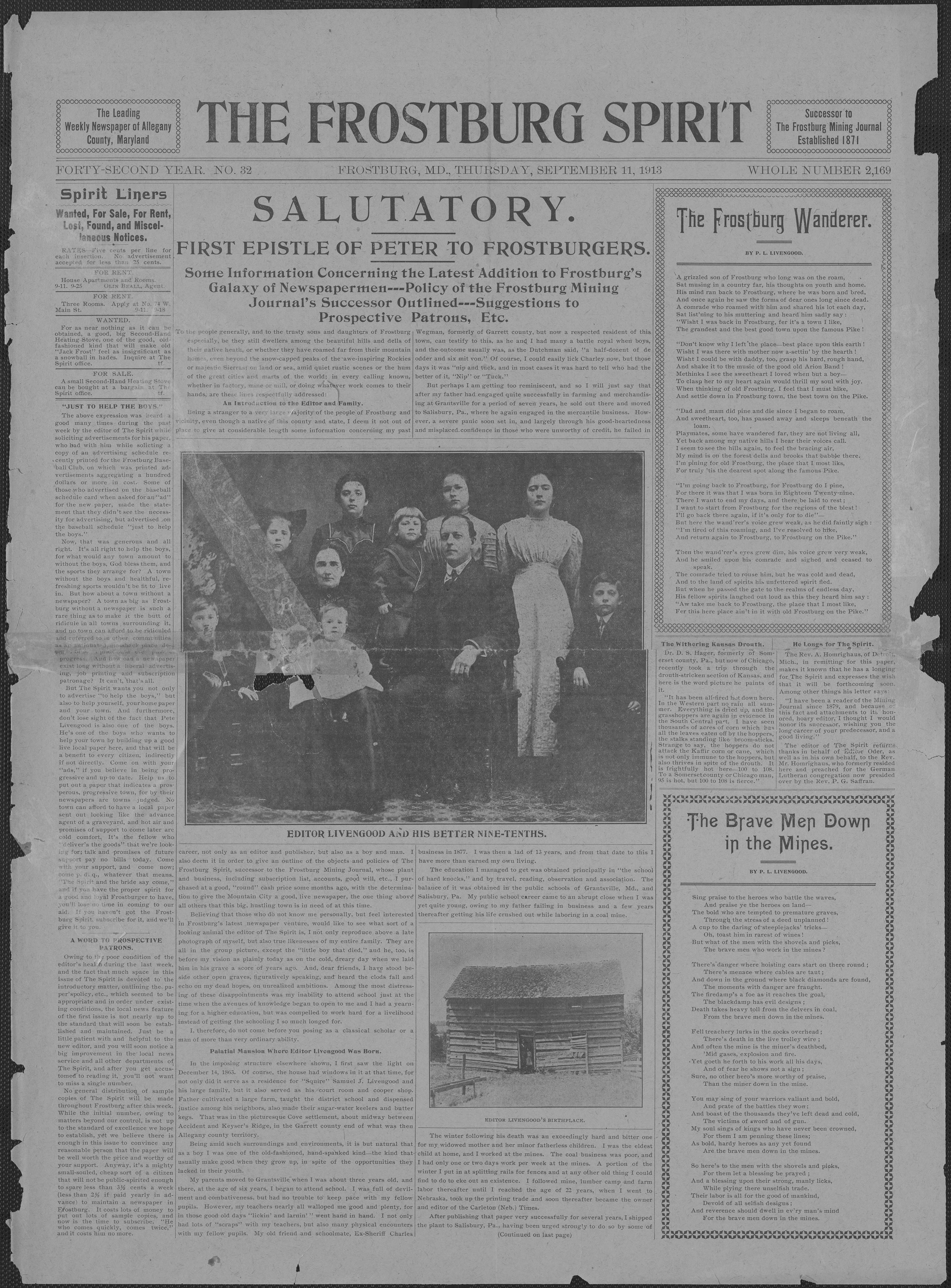
- The cover page of the September 11, 1913 issue of The Frostburg Spirit
- Type: Weekly newspaper
- Founder(s): Peter L. Livengood
- Publisher: Peter L. Livengood, Lawrence Hitchins
- Editor: Peter L. Livengood, J. Benson Oder
- Founded: September 11, 1913
- Ceased publication: January 28, 1915
- Headquarters: Frostburg, Maryland
- OCLC number: 22154055

The Frostburg Spirit was weekly newspaper that was published by Peter L. Livengood in Frostburg, Maryland from September 11, 1913, to January 28, 1915. Livengood was a lifelong participant in the newspaper business, having previously published Maryland's Salisbury Star and Pennsylvania's Meyersdale Republican. Livengood purchased the printing plant and subscription list of the defunct Frostburg Mining Journal, viewing the paper as the Spirit's predecessor and even continuing its volume and issue numbering system. He ran the Spirit for only a few years before announcing in January 1915 that he had sold the paper to Lawrence Hitchins due to his own failing health and that former beloved editor J. Benson Oder would return as editor. The paper would also resume operating under its previous name, Frostburg Mining Journal.

During the Spirit's short lifespan, Livengood regarded it as a repository of Republican values, yet he also showed support for organized labor in the paper's inaugural issue with his original poem "The Brave Men Down in the Mines." The paper encouraged support for local commerce and kept readers informed with extensive coverage of local news, summaries of national and global news events, and updates on sports, fashion, and culture.
