= The Democratic Advocate =

1865–1968 American newspaper

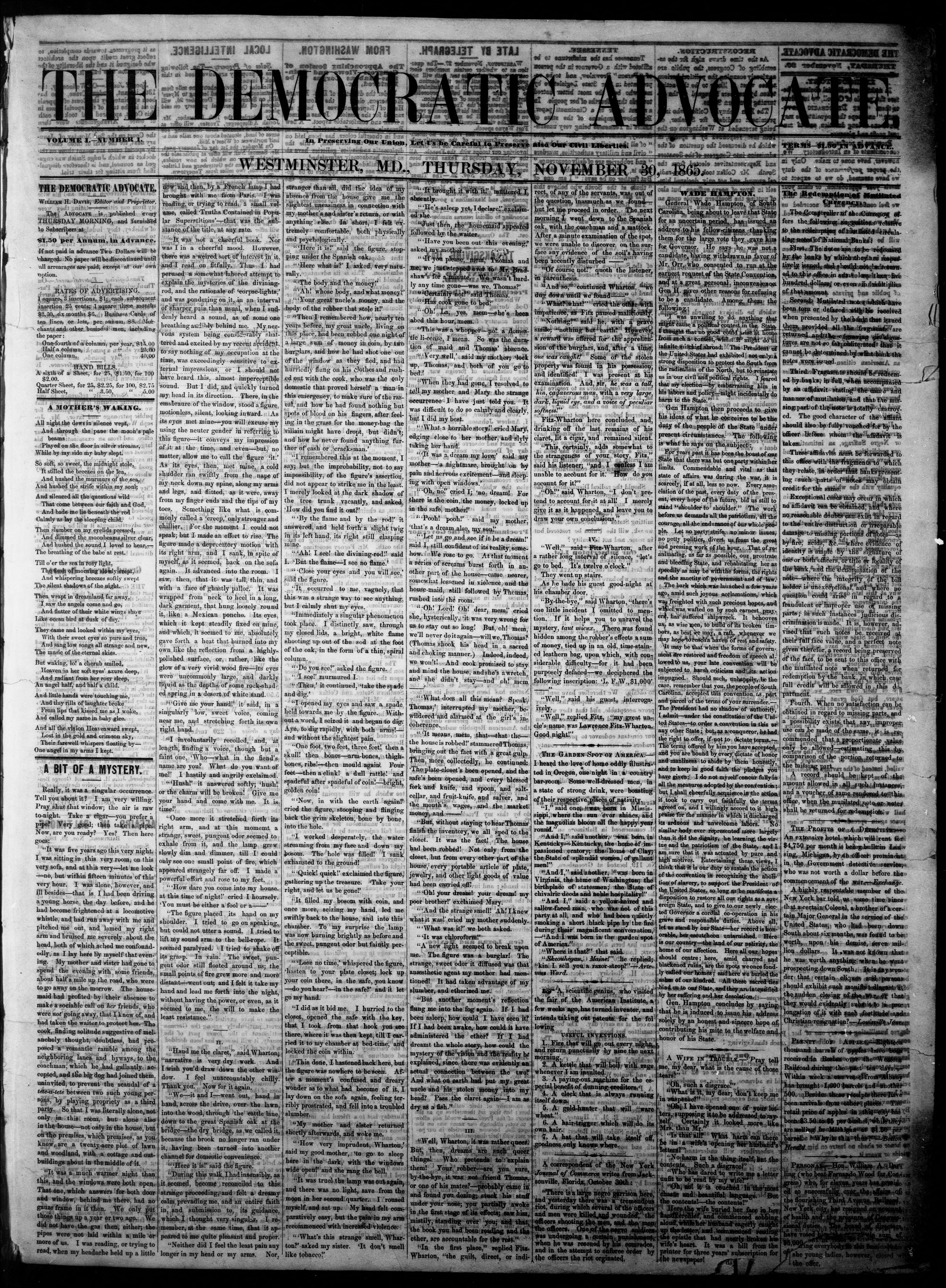
- The cover page of the November 30, 1865 inaugural issue of The Democratic Advocate
- Type: Semiweekly newspaper
- Founder: William H. Davis
- Publisher: William H. Davis (1865-1868), William H. Vanderford (1868-1878), Vanderford Bros. (1878-1906), The Democratic Advocate Company (1906-1968)
- Editor: Joseph M. Parke (1865-1867), Henry Vanderford (1868-1878), Charles Vanderford (1878-1906), Edward O. Diffendal (1906-1960), Virginia Minnick (1960-1968)
- Founded: November 30, 1865
- Ceased publication: 1972
- Language: English
- Headquarters: Westminster, Maryland
- ISSN: 2474-3291
- OCLC number: 12126077

The Democratic Advocate was a semiweekly newspaper published from November 30, 1865 to 1968 in Westminster, Carroll County, Maryland. Shortly after its predecessor, the Western Maryland Democrat, ceased publication due to violence from an angry mob in the aftermath of the assassination of Abraham Lincoln, former publisher William H. Davis established the Advocate in 1865. About a year later, Davis turned over operations to Joseph M. Parke, a lawyer and Democratic office holder.

After gaining control of the paper, Parke published the following promise: "We promise to the down trodden people of Maryland our best efforts in their cause, and our firm adhesion to the principles of the great Conservative National Party now rising, whose mission it will be, under the providence of God, to sweep from power every distracting element which stands in the way of a speedy restoration of our whole country to its former united and happy condition."

On November 28, 1867, Parke sold the paper back to Davis until, in 1868, William H. Vanderford assumed control of the Advocate and installed his father, Henry Vanderford, in the position of editor. Henry Vanderford was an experienced newspaperman who had previously published the Cecil Democrat in the 1840s. This change of management marked an increase in prosperity for the paper: circulation increased, advertising and job patronage expanded, and the subscription price increased from $1.50 to $2 per year. The proprietorship of the paper changed slightly in 1878, with William's younger brother Charles Vanderford joining the team as co-editor. Charles also had previous newspaper experience - both with Middletown, Delaware's Middletown Transcript and with Harrisonburg, Virginia's Old Commonwealth.

In the 1870s, the Democratic Advocate printed a special feature called "The Farmer," which included poems, tips on crop growing procedures, agricultural reports, fertilizer information, and livestock advice.

Charles Vanderford died in 1906, and his father William bought his son's interest in the paper and formed The Democratic Advocate Company. With this change, the paper again published a solemn promise to its readers, affirming, "The paper will, as heretofore, be distinctively a Democratic newspaper, upholding and promoting, as far as it may be able, the principles of the Democratic party. It will be conducted upon the broad and conservative lines of a Democratic paper desiring to serve the entire party. It will in no way seek to promote the political interests of individuals, nor interfere, in any way, with the free expression of the will of the Democrats of our county in the choice of candidates for public office."

The Historical Society of Carroll County notes that Dr. J. Howard Billingslea was president of The Democratic Advocate Company while William H. Vanderford was editor. His successor Edward Diffendal acted as editor from 1906 to 1960, when Virginia Minnick took over as managing editor. The final issue of the paper was published on December 26, 1968, after which the Advocate was purchased by the Carroll County Times and published as the Advocate-Times until September 25, 1972.

In terms of political tone, the Democratic Advocate, though staunchly Democratic, reflected the increasingly mundane political interests of the citizens of Carroll County. The Carroll County Agricultural Society opened a new fairgrounds and race track in 1869, placing emphasis on the importance of farming to the area's economy. Milling was an especially profitable enterprise, so when in 1872 a prominent local miller was murdered, the community followed the trials, appeals, and eventual execution of the murderer Joseph Davis in the Advocate as well as its rival paper, the American Sentinel.
