= Bay Times and Record-Observer =

Newspaper in Stevensville, Maryland, US

- Type: Weekly newspaper
- Format: Tabloid
- Owner: Adams MultiMedia
- President: Jim Normandin
- Editor: Angela Price
- Founded: 1824
- Language: English
- Headquarters: Easton, Maryland
- Circulation: 1,538 (as of 2021)
- Website: myeasternshoremd.com/qa

The Kent Island Bay Times and Record-Observer is a weekly newspaper that covers Queen Anne's County, Maryland. The paper formed in 2020 through the merger of The Kent Island Bay Times and The Record-Observer. It is owned by APG Chesapeake.

== History ==
The Record-Observer in Centreville, Maryland dates back to 1824. The newspaper formed from the 1936 merger of The Centreville Observer and Queen Anne Record. In the 1930s it was purchased by Leon Asa Andrus. In 1946, Andrus would go on to wage a successful multi-year editorial campaign to get the Chesapeake Bay Bridge built.

The Kent Island Bay Times was first published in 1963. It was created by Christopher J. Rosendale Sr. and his wife Mary Lou. The first issue covered the assassination of John F. Kennedy. The paper would go on to win an award from the National Newspaper Association for pictures Rosendale took of the Cambridge riots of the 1960s. Also of note, in 1972 Rosendale was the first journalist to get previously secret information, in this case on nonsupport cases, by suing under the state’s Public Information Law, which had been enacted two years earlier. The Rosendales sold Bay Times in 1974.

In 2007, American Consolidated Media LLC of Dallas, Texas, acquired the publishing assets of Chesapeake Publishing Corporation. The sale included the Bay Times and Record-Observer. American Consolidated Media sold the two newspapers in 2014 to Adams Publishing Group. The company merged the papers together in 2020 to form Bay Times & Record-Observer.
