= Baltimore Chronicle =

Alternative newspaper in Baltimore, Maryland

- Type: Alternative newspaper
- Founded: 1976 (as Baltimore Chronicle)
- Headquarters: Baltimore, Maryland, U.S.
- Website: baltimorechronicle.com

The Baltimore Chronicle, founded as The City Dweller, is a small free, independent, monthly alternative newspaper, published in Baltimore, Maryland. It was founded by Larry Krause in April 1973 and incorporated as Schenley Press, Inc. in 1976, when the paper adopted its present name. Its purpose is to air different points of view, with special focus on controversial stories.

All of the paper's writers are free contributors. Over the years, it expanded to serve 27 different communities in Baltimore, and fostered local writers and provided internships for high school and college students. In 2004, it had a circulation of about 28,000.

In the early 1980s, the Chronicle added national and international reporting and commentary, seeking to supplement the news then locally available. In 1989, Krause and others established the nonprofit Baltimore News Network, Inc., which began publishing The Sentinel, a small newspaper that highlighted peace and social justice news and views and which, due to its nonprofit status, was able to obtain reprint permissions that were otherwise unavailable to the Chronicle. The Chronicle returned to its primarily local beat, carrying the Sentinel as an insert.

In 1995, the Chronicle established its website. At first, this site mirrored the print reportage in the Chronicle and Sentinel; gradually, the site began posting daily, becoming a far more extensive and timely source of news and views.

In 2003, the Baltimore Chronicle was acquired by Baltimore News Network, Inc. and the print edition ceased. Others active during the long tenure of the newspaper include Alice Cherbonnier, its managing editor and wife of Larry Krause, and her brother, Marc Cherbonnier, the webmaster.
