= Greenbelt News Review =

Weekly newspaper in Greenbelt, Maryland, US

- Type: Weekly newspaper
- Format: Tabloid
- Owner: Greenbelt Cooperative Publishing Association
- Editor: Mary Lou Williamson
- Managing editor: Anna Bedford-Dillow
- Founded: 1937
- Headquarters: Greenbelt; USA
- ISSN: 2832-7586
- OCLC number: 19952343
- Website: greenbeltnewsreview.com

The Greenbelt News Review is a weekly newspaper that was established in 1937 as a volunteer cooperative shortly after settlement of Greenbelt, Maryland, and was originally named the Greenbelt Cooperator until its name was changed in 1954. It has been published without interruption every week since its founding, and is distributed free by a network of carriers to all city residents.

The News Review was always intended to be a newspaper created by and for the citizens of Greenbelt; "more than a voice in the town, it was meant to be the voice of Greenbelt as a whole." Since its early days, many of the prominent editors and newspaper staff have been women: Mary Lou Williamson held the job of editor for the longest, over twenty-five years, and frequently shared the role with Dorothy Sucher throughout the 1960s as a result of both of them having babies. Other female staffers include Virginia Beauchamp, editor in 1962; Mary Granofsky, editor from 1967 to 1972; Barbara Likowski, editor during parts of 1989 and 1990; and Elaine Skolnik, who began working at the paper in 1954 and served as editor from 1977 to 1986. Harry Zubkoff was also a prominent editor, holding the position four times throughout the 1950s and 1960s and impressing other staffers with his "firebrand opinions."

== 1970 Supreme Court libel case ==
Greenbelt Cooperator front page, December 19, 1941.

In 1965, an article by reporter Dorothy Sucher in the News Review published two quotations of citizen remarks at City Council meetings in which they characterized as "blackmail" the actions of Charles S. Bresler, a local real estate developer and member of the Maryland House of Delegates. Bresler filed suit in 1966, claiming that he had become "the most hated man in Greenbelt." Local volunteers formed a Freedom of the Press committee and went door to door to raise money for the paper's legal defense.

Bresler received a $17,500 libel judgment from the Prince George's County Circuit Court, which was upheld by the Maryland Court of Appeals in 1969.

In 1970, the Supreme Court of the United States ruled unanimously in favor of the News Review and overturned the lower courts' judgments. The Supreme Court held "that as a matter of constitutional law, the word 'blackmail' in these circumstances was not slander when spoken, and not libel when reported in the Greenbelt News Review."
