= Baltimore Times =

Newspaper in Baltimore, Maryland

The Baltimore Times
- Type: Weekly newspaper
- Owner: Joy Bramble
- Founded: November 1986
- Headquarters: 2513 N. Charles Street, Baltimore, MD 21218
- Website: baltimoretimes-online.com

The Baltimore Times is a free weekly newspaper founded in 1986 that covers the African-American community in Baltimore County, Maryland. The newspaper circulates to 32,000 people, and its tagline is "positive stories about positive people."

== History ==
The Baltimore Times was founded in November 1986 by Joy and Peter Bramble in their Baltimore home. The Brambles focused coverage on positive stories as a way to counteract negative press of the African American community. In a 2019 interview with Black Enterprise magazine, Joy Bramble described what she recalls thinking when she decided to launch the Baltimore Times:

"I was looking at the local news one evening listening to the catalog of murders, crime, and mayhem committed reportedly mostly by African Americans. I glanced at the front page of the daily paper on our coffee table with similar headlines. It struck me that the radio news pretty much had the same tune. I realized that if black folks were constantly reading, seeing and hearing that we are criminals it then becomes the self-fulfilling prophecy for young people and the society. I knew so many positive things that were happening in the black community and none of these things ever made the news. My husband and I right there and then decided to start a newspaper that would only publish the positive things happening in the black community: successful young people; working, happy families; churches making a difference; teachers producing students despite lack of resources."

In 2017, The Westside Gazette reported that after more than thirty years, Joy Bramble said the Baltimore Times, and its companion, the Annapolis Times, have continued to only publish positive stories about Black people. In her 2019 interview with Black Enterprise magazine, Bramble described the ongoing development of the Baltimore Times, including online at the newspaper's website and through social media, stating "we are fast becoming a media company as we introduce video, a possible radio station, and podcasting to attract millennials as our new readers (online of course) of the coming generation."

=== Community activities ===
The company expanded to offer community workshops and seminars to increase awareness of opportunities related to business, education, healthcare, and finance. Eunice Moseley of The Washington Informer reported that it "was the first company to offer community events in Baltimore that provided free services with its Housing Expo (onsite pre-approvals), Health Expo (free health care screenings), Men’s Expo (free health care screenings) and Women’s Expo (free seminars)."

==== Positive People Awards ====
The newspaper founded the Positive People Awards in 1992 to acknowledge leaders in Baltimore.

==== Times Community Services ====
In 1998, the Times Community Services was formed as a 501(c)(3) organization dedicated to philanthropic efforts.

== Circulation ==
The newspaper was originally founded as a monthly publication, but it transitioned to a weekly newspaper one month after its first edition. Due to the popularity of The Baltimore Times, the Brambles began publishing Black-focused newspapers dedicated to other areas of Maryland: The Annapolis Times, The Shore Times, The Prince George's County Times, and The Baltimore County Times.

The newspaper publishes each Friday. In 2020, the Baltimore Times was estimated to have a circulation of 32,000.

== Recognition ==
In 2019, publisher Joy Bramble was honored in Baltimore with a wax figure placed in the National Great Blacks In Wax Museum, and a proclamation from the Maryland House and Senate before the unveiling.

== See also ==
- Baltimore Afro-American
- Media in Baltimore
- List of newspapers in Maryland
- National Newspaper Publishers Association
