= Frostburg Mining Journal =

Newspaper in Frostburg, Maryland, US (1871–1913)

- Type: Weekly newspaper
- Founder(s): J. Benson Oder
- Founded: September 30, 1871
- Ceased publication: April 18, 1913
- Relaunched: 1915–1917
- Headquarters: Frostburg, Maryland
- OCLC number: 11681313

The Frostburg Mining Journal was a weekly newspaper published in Frostburg, Maryland, from September 30, 1871, to April 18, 1913, and then again briefly from 1915 to 1917.

== History ==
It was founded by J. R. Grove and J. Benson Oder; the latter had previously served in the Confederate army under Stonewall Jackson. On February 25, 1872, C. H. Walker took over for Grove until Oder purchased his interest and assumed sole proprietorship of the paper in 1873. He continued his role as editor until the paper was sold and renamed in 1913, even while being elected to Maryland's House of Delegates in 1877. After the newspaper's publishing company failed in 1913, Peter L. Livengood bought its printing plant and subscription list and commenced publishing that September under the new name The Frostburg Spirit, which was considered the successor to the Mining Journal. Livengood announced in 1915 that he had sold the Spirit to Lawrence Hitchens, with J. Benson Oder returning as editor, and that the publication would resume its former name of Frostburg Mining Journal. He published an announcement in the January 28, 1915, issue of the Spirit stating, "My only reason for selling The Spirit can be summed up in two words—poor health." The second iteration of the Mining Journal would only run for a few short years before stopping publication in June 1917.

== Content ==
The Mining Journal was a four-page sheet, seven column paper. It concerned itself mainly with local events and community issues, with a few major events capturing its attention over the course of its publication. The first of these was a large fire which destroyed a large part of downtown Frostburg in 1874; another was the Great Strike of 1892, which Oder and the paper were sympathetic towards. An advertisement was placed in the paper by miners in April 1873 calling for a meeting to form a union "for the better protection of [their] interests." Oder's editorials during the 1880s were supportive of organized labor associations and of the striking coal miners in the region.
