= Mass media in Cumberland, Maryland =

Cumberland, Maryland, has several media outlets, most carrying some form of satellite programming. WCBC-AM and the Cumberland Times-News actively collect their local news content, while WFRB-FM has some local news content, but do not actively collect it.

Aside from some local news programming, virtually no mass media content originates from Cumberland. The local media tends to rebroadcast Hagerstown, Baltimore and Washington, DC, television stations for news coverage.

Commercial Media is available from such companies as Allegany Media, and Commercial Video. Both companies as based out of Cumberland, Maryland.

== Print ==
- Allegany Magazine (Cumberland)
- Bedford Gazette (Bedford, PA)
- Cumberland Times-News (Cumberland)
- Daily American (Somerset, PA)
- Keyser Mineral Daily News-Tribune (Keyser, WV)
- Morgan Messenger (Berkeley Springs, WV)

=== Historic ===
- 1808-1809: Cumberland Impartialist
- 1809-1809: American Eagle
- 1813-1818: Allegany Freeman
- 1814-181?: Alleghany Federalist
- 1814-1814: Cumberland Gazette
- 1820-1867: Alleganian
- 1823-1832: Advocate, and Farmers' & Mechanics' Register
- 1823-1835: Maryland Advocate
- 1828-1882: Civilian
- 1829-1851: Cumberland Civilian
- 1832-1838: Advocate
- 1833-1840: Phoenix Civilian
- 1843-1902: Cumberland Alleganian
- 1851-185?: Unionist
- 1851-1856: Cumberland Miners' Journal Cumberland
- 1852-1859: Cumberland Telegraph
- 1859-1875: Civilian & Telegraph
- 1861-1861: Democratic Alleganian
- 1862-1867: Allegany County Gazette
- 1862-1868: Cumberland Union
- 1869-186?: Mountain City Times
- 1872-1891: Cumberland Daily Times
- 1876-1877: Cumberland Alleganian and Daily Times
- 1877-1878: Daily Alleganian and Times
- 1877-1879: Alleganian and Times
- 1878-1881: Cumberland Times
- 1879-187?: Independent
- 1881-1884: Daily Times
- 1882-1890: Sunday Civilian
- 1890-189?: Daily News
- 1890-189?: Weekly Civilian
- 1891-189?: Cumberland Freie Presse
- 1894-1895: Sunday Scimitar
- 1912-191?: Cumberland Press
- 1892-1916: Evening Times
- 1935-193?: Cumberland Guide
- 1871-1938: Cumberland Daily News
- 1937-1938: Voice
- 1938-1942: Voice of Labor
- 1942-194?: CIO News: Western Maryland edition
- 1961-1961: Allegany Garrett Citizen
- 1961-1983: Citizen
- 1938-1988: Cumberland News
- 1916-1988: Cumberland Evening Times
- 1988–present: Cumberland Times-News

=== References ===
- Albert L. Feldstein, Feldstein's Historic Banner Front Pages of the Cumberland Daily News, Cumberland News and Cumberland Evening News vol I: 20th Century (Cumberland: Albert L. Feldstein, 1986).
- Albert L. Feldstein, Feldstein's Historic Newspapers of Allegany County vol. II: 19th and 20th Centuries (Cumberland: Albert L. Feldstein, 1987)

== Radio ==
Cumberland is served by 18 radio stations, 14 FM and 4 AM. Most are owned by local companies, such as WTBO-WKGO Corporation, LLC, which owns WFRB 560/WFRB-FM 105.3, WRQE 106.1 and WTBO-AM 1450; Cumberland Broadcasting Company owns two stations, WCBC-AM 1270/FM 107.1. Others are owned by West Virginia Radio Corporation out of nearby Morgantown, WV.

=== FM band ===
Call Letters	Frequency	City	Format	Owner	Notes
WAIJ	90.3	Grantsville, Maryland	Religious	He's Alive, Inc.	simulcasts on WLIC-FM/Frostburg
WFWM	91.9	Frostburg, Maryland	Public Radio/NPR	Frostburg State University	simulcasts on 96.3 in Oakland
WQZS	93.3	Meyersdale, Pennsylvania	Oldies	Roger Wahl	branded as "QZ-93"
WQZK	94.1	Keyser, West Virginia	Contemporary Hit Radio	West Virginia Radio Corporation	switched to CHR on 01/09/07
WLIC	97.1	Frostburg, Maryland	Religious	He's Alive, Inc.	simulcasts WAIJ-FM/Grantsville
W253AB	98.5	Cumberland, Maryland	Country	WTBO-WKGO Corporation, LLC	simulcasts WFRB-FM/Frostburg
WDZN	99.5	Midland, Maryland	Country	West Virginia Radio Corporation	branded as "The Wolf"
WVMD	100.1	Romney, West Virginia	Active Rock	West Virginia Radio Corporation	simulcasts on 99.9 in Cumberland
WDYK	100.5	Ridgeley, West Virginia	Adult Contemporary	West Virginia Radio Corporation	branded as Magic 100.5
WWPN	101.1	Westernport, Maryland	Contemporary Christian	Ernest F. Santmyire	branded as "Spirit 101"
W271AT	102.1	Cumberland, Maryland	Contemporary Hit Radio	West Virginia Radio Corporation	simulcasting WQZK to Cumberland proper
W280CF	103.9	Cumberland, Maryland	Religious	Cedar Ridge Children's Home & School, Inc.	re-broadcasts on WCRH-FM/Williamsport, MD
WVXS	104.1	Romney, West Virginia	Classic Country	West Virginia Schools for the Deaf and Blind	
WFRB-FM	105.3	Frostburg, Maryland	Country	WTBO-WKGO Corporation, LLC	market's #1 station
WRQE	106.1	Cumberland, Maryland	Classic Rock/Modern Rock	WTBO-WKGO Corporation, LLC	branded as "Rocky 106"
WCBC-FM	107.1	Keyser, West Virginia	Oldies	Cumberland Broadcasting Corporation	branded as "Oldies 107"

- all stations listed cover Cumberland with a city grade signal

=== AM band ===
Call Letters	Frequency	City	Format	Owner	Notes
WFRB	560	Frostburg, Maryland	News/Talk/Sports	WTBO-WKGO Corporation, LLC	
WCMD	1230	Cumberland, Maryland	All Sports/ESPN	West Virginia Radio Corporations	was top 40 WCUM in the '60s
WCBC	1270	Cumberland, Maryland	Full Service	Cumberland Broadcasting Corporation	#1 AM Station
WTBO	1450	Cumberland, Maryland	Standards/Sports	WTBO-WKGO Corporation, LLC	

- all stations listed cover Cumberland with a city grade signal

== Television ==
Cumberland and the surrounding area are part of the Washington, D. C. television market.

Cumberland is home to TBN translator, W43BP, broadcast from nearby Cresaptown, Maryland. Channel 43 covers Cumberland and Frostburg with a city-grade signal simulcasting TBN's main signal. W43BP has requested a "construction permit" to broadcast as a digital (or HD) low-power translator. This will be done "flash-cut" when it does happen. W43BP is carried on Atlantic Broadband cable channel 49 for Cumberland, Frostburg, and Keyser. W43BP is owned by Trinity Broadcasting Network.

Local TV news is provided by Hagerstown station, WDVM-TV 25. Rarely though is Cumberland or any part of Western Maryland featured unless it is a large story.

=== Cable television ===
Atlantic Broadband provides cable service to Cumberland. Nearby communities Frostburg, Maryland, Keyser, West Virginia and Grantsville, Maryland are served Comcast (formerly Adelphia).

== See also ==
- Maryland media
  - List of newspapers in Maryland
  - List of radio stations in Maryland
  - List of television stations in Maryland
  - Media of locales in Maryland: Baltimore, College Park, Frederick, Gaithersburg
