= WFRB =

WFRB may refer to:

- WFRB (AM), a radio station (560 AM) licensed to Frostburg, Maryland, United States
- WFRB-FM, a radio station (105.3 FM) licensed to Frostburg, Maryland, United States
