= WCBC =

WCBC may refer to:

Boat Clubs:

- Wadham College Boat Club, the rowing club of Wadham College, Oxford University, England
- Wolfson College Boat Club (Cambridge), the rowing club of Wolfson College, Cambridge, England
- Worcester College Boat Club, the rowing club of Worcester College, Oxford, England

Colleges:

- West Coast Baptist College, an Independent Fundamental Baptist Bible college in Lancaster, California

Radio Stations:

- WCBC (AM), a radio station broadcasting at 1270 kHz on the AM band, licensed to Cumberland, Maryland
- WCBC-FM, a radio station broadcasting at 107.1 MHz on the FM band, licensed to Keyser, West Virginia
