= WLIC (disambiguation) =

WLIC may also refer to:

- A radio station in Frostburg, Maryland, see WLIC.
- World Library and Information Congress
- Wisconsin Livestock Identification Consortium, see National Animal Identification System#Civil rights concerns
