= WFRB (AM) =

Classic country radio station in Frostburg, Maryland

Frostburg, Maryland; United States
- Broadcast area: Cumberland Metro
- Frequency: 560 kHz
- Branding: Willie 106-7/560

Programming
- Language: English
- Format: Classic country
- Affiliations: Real Country (Westwood One)

Ownership
- Owner: Forever Media; (FM Radio Licenses, LLC)
- Sister stations: WFRB-FM; WRQE; WTBO

History
- First air date: December 20, 1958
- Call sign meaning: Frostburg

Technical information
- Licensing authority: FCC
- Facility ID: 71868
- Class: D
- Power: 5,000 watts (day); 55 watts (night)
- Transmitter coordinates: 39°41′2.0″N 78°57′57.0″W
- Translator: 106.7 W294CF (Frostburg)

Links
- Public license information: Public file; LMS
- Webcast: Listen live
- Website: www.forevercumberland.com/willie/

WFRB (560 kHz) is a classic country formatted broadcast commercial AM radio station licensed to Frostburg, Maryland, United States.

Due to WFRB's low position on the dial, it covers most of Western Maryland, the Potomac Highlands of West Virginia, and parts of Southern Pennsylvania. WFRB is owned and operated by Forever Media, through licensee FM Radio Licenses, LLC.

== Programming ==
Mornings were led by Quinn and Rose from nearby Pittsburgh station WPGB. Syndicated programs from Glenn Beck, Rush Limbaugh, and Dennis Miller are also heard. Saturday programming, and programming after 7PM on weekdays consists of shows syndicated from the Fox Radio Network such as John Gibson, Alan Colms, and "Kilmeade and Friends". On Sundays, religious broadcasts are aired from 7AM to Noon, followed and preceded by talk shows from the Fox Radio Network.

Sports broadcasts by WFRB are syndicated from their sister station WTBO and consist of the Pittsburgh Penguins, Pittsburgh Steelers, and the Baltimore Orioles. In addition to these major league teams, WFRB serves as the home station for Mountain Ridge High School Football, broadcasting all home and away games during the season. All sports broadcasts override the normal talk show programming, but are not available when you are listening online. On June 1, 2018, WFRB flipped to classic country as "Willie 106.7/560".
