= WCMD =

WCMD may refer to:

- Wind Corrected Munitions Dispenser
- WCMD (AM), a radio station (1230 AM) licensed to Cumberland, Maryland, United States
- WCMD-FM, a radio station (89.9 FM) licensed to Barre, Vermont, United States
