= WDZN =

Radio station in Midland, Maryland

Midland, Maryland; United States
- Broadcast area: Cumberland Metro
- Frequency: 99.5 MHz
- Branding: 99.5 DZN

Programming
- Format: Active rock
- Affiliations: Compass Media Networks

Ownership
- Owner: WVRC Media; (West Virginia Radio Corporation of the Alleghenies)
- Sister stations: WCMD, WDYK, WKLP, WQZK-FM, WVMD

History
- First air date: April 1, 2008
- Former call signs: WVMD (2007–2012)
- Call sign meaning: Disambiguation of "Disney" (former WVMD call sign and format)

Technical information
- Licensing authority: FCC
- Facility ID: 166026
- Class: A
- Power: 1,050 watts
- HAAT: 240 meters (790 ft)
- Transmitter coordinates: 39°40′29.50″N 78°57′43.30″W
- Repeater: 99.5 WDZN-FM1 (Cumberland)

Links
- Public license information: Public file; LMS
- Webcast: WDZN Webstream
- Website: WDZN Online

WDZN (99.5 MHz) is an active rock formatted broadcast commercial FM radio station licensed to Midland, Maryland, serving the Cumberland Metro area. WDZN is owned and operated by WVRC Media.

== History ==
Originally known as WVMD, the station was scheduled to begin broadcasting sometime in early 2007, but finally launched with a smooth jazz format on April 1, 2008, at midnight. Later that afternoon, a man named "Stu" claimed to have broken into and taken the radio station "hostage", playing only Country and demanding that the owner of the station bring back the John Boy and Billy show. John Boy and Billy had previously aired on WQZK, then an active rock station, which West Virginia Radio Corporation purchased in December 2006, and subsequently changed the format to Contemporary hit radio.

On the afternoon of April 2, it was announced that the smooth jazz format and the man named "Stu" were part of an April Fools' Day joke and that the station would in fact, be carrying a country music format.

The 99.5 frequency was previously home to a translator of Cumberland area radio station WCBC-FM.

Locally produced "Sunday Morning Bluegrass", which was previously heard on WROG, moved to WVMD on September 7, 2008.

On August 10, 2012, the station changed its call sign and its format to WDZN as part of a swap with its Romney, West Virginia-based sister station, 100.1 FM.

On October 3, 2016, WDZN changed their format from active rock to classic hits.

On February 7, 2022, at 9 a.m., WDZN changed their format from classic hits back to active rock, branded as "99.5 DZN", with the first song being "Smells Like Teen Spirit" by Nirvana.

== FM Booster ==
WDZN's transmitter is located near Frostburg and the station's main signal has trouble reaching downtown Cumberland.

As such, West Virginia Radio Corporation applied for an FM booster, WDZN-FM1, located in Cumberland. The booster's antenna is located off Virginia Avenue, near Queen Street near the center of the city. This central location allows the booster to provide complete coverage of Cumberland.

Call sign	Frequency	City of license	FID	ERP (W)	Class	FCC info
WDZN-FM1	99.5 FM	Cumberland, Maryland	177584	750	D	LMS
