= The Citizen (Cumberland) =

- Type: Weekly newspaper
- Founder(s): M. Virginia Rosenbaum
- Publisher: Rosenbaum Enterprises, Inc.
- Founded: November 14, 1961
- Ceased publication: October 27, 1983
- ISSN: 0746-5424
- OCLC number: 10125487

The Citizen was a weekly newspaper published in Cumberland, Allegany County, Maryland from November 14, 1961 to October 27, 1983. In addition to Cumberland, The Citizen also served the nearby cities of Frostburg, Maryland and Oakland, Maryland.

== History ==
The Citizen was first published on November 14, 1961, having been purchased months earlier by M. Virginia Rosenbaum, a local county surveyor and Maryland's first female professional surveyor. Rosenbaum purchased The Allegany Citizen, a local weekly newspaper that had been founded in 1948, and published it under a new name, The Allegany Garrett Citizen, on August 4, 1961. Later that same year, she changed its name again to The Citizen, and the paper continued publication under this name until 1983, when the paper fell under the ownership of Mr. and Mrs. Harry M. Fox.

During the years of its publication, The Citizen gave an independent view of local economic and political happenings. Though the coal industry was no longer a major employer in the region, the legacy of the industry remained part of the local identity. Major corporations such as tire manufacturer Kelly Springfield and textile manufacturer American Celanese replaced the hole in the economy left by the disappearing coal industry; later, The Citizen would document the decline and eventual demise of both companies in the 1980s.

Rosenbaum's Citizen gained notoriety for leading the opposition to adding fluoride to the local water supply, she successfully headed seven different campaigns to purify Maryland's drinking water.
