= WKYW =

WKYW may refer to:

- WKYW (AM), a radio station (1490 AM) licensed to serve Frankfort, Kentucky, United States
- WKYW-LP, a low-power radio station (102.9 FM) licensed to serve Keyser, West Virginia, United States
