= WTBO =

Radio station in Cumberland, Maryland

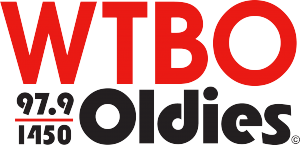
- Cumberland, Maryland; United States
- Broadcast area: Cumberland, Maryland; Frostburg, Maryland; Keyser, West Virginia
- Frequency: 1450 kHz
- Branding: 97.9/1450 WTBO

Programming
- Format: Oldies

Ownership
- Owner: Forever Media; (FM Radio Licenses, LLC)
- Sister stations: WFRB; WFRB-FM; WRQE

History
- First air date: December 13, 1928; 97 years ago
- Call sign meaning: "The Best Oldies"

Technical information
- Licensing authority: FCC
- Facility ID: 74082
- Class: C
- Power: 1,000 watts (day) and (night)
- Transmitter coordinates: 39°38′45.0″N 78°45′8.0″W
- Translator: 97.9 W250CM (Cumberland)

Links
- Public license information: Public file; LMS
- Webcast: Listen live
- Website: Official website

WTBO is an oldies formatted broadcast radio station licensed to Cumberland, Maryland, serving Cumberland and Frostburg in Maryland and Keyser in West Virginia. WTBO is owned and operated by Forever Media.

== History ==
On December 13, 1928, WTBO signed on for the first time.

On December 26, 2006, Chazz Offutt collapsed and died, at the age of 66, during his daily morning show on WTBO and sister-station WFRB.

On April 1, 2015, WTBO (after six hours of stunting with various versions of "Proud Mary") changed their format to Adult Contemporary, branded as "105.7 The River". WTBO and sister stations WFRB, WFRB-FM, and WKGO were sold by Dix Communications to Forever Media for $4 million on September 3, 2015. On March 8, 2016, WTBO changed their format to top 40/CHR, branded as "Happy 105-7". As with many other stations owned by Forever their programming comes from Westwood One Hot AC Local.

On April 18, 2018, WTBO changed their format from hot adult contemporary to oldies, branded as "The Best Oldies".

== See also ==
- M. Virginia Rosenbaum, former station manager
