= WKLP =

- Keyser, West Virginia; United States
- Broadcast area: Cumberland Metro
- Frequency: 1390 kHz
- Branding: ESPN Radio 1390

Programming
- Format: Sports
- Network: ESPN Radio
- Affiliations: West Virginia MetroNews

Ownership
- Owner: WVRC Media; (Starcast Systems, Inc.)
- Sister stations: WCMD, WDYK, WDZN, WQZK-FM, WVMD

History
- First air date: 1965
- Call sign meaning: Westernport Keyser Luke Piedmont

Technical information
- Licensing authority: FCC
- Facility ID: 62340
- Class: D
- Power: 1,000 watts day 74 watts night
- Transmitter coordinates: 39°26′12.0″N 78°57′21.0″W

Links
- Public license information: Public file; LMS

WKLP (1390 AM) is a sports formatted broadcast radio station licensed to Keyser, West Virginia, serving the Cumberland Metro. WKLP is owned and operated by WVRC Media.

== Format flip ==
On October 13, 2008 WKLP flipped from adult standards to sports carrying programming from ESPN Radio.
