= Mineral Daily News-Tribune =

Newspaper in Keyser, West Virginia, US

Mineral News and Tribune
- Type: Daily newspaper
- Format: Broadsheet
- Owner: NCWV Media
- Editor: Liz Beavers
- Founded: June 12, 1912, as Mineral Daily News.
- Ceased publication: Mineral Daily News Tribune (Spring 2022)
- Headquarters: 21 Shamrock Drive, Keyser, West Virginia 26726, United States
- Circulation: 2,605 (as of 2016)
- OCLC number: 13048022
- Website: wvnews.com/mineralnews

The Mineral News and Tribune is an American newspaper published in Keyser, West Virginia. The News Tribune publishes four days a week: Tuesday, Thursday, Friday, and Saturday. It is the newspaper of record for "Mineral County, and the Potomac Highlands", in the Cumberland metropolitan area.

== History ==
It took its name after the 1928 merger of the Mineral Daily News and the Keyser Tribune. The Daily News was founded in Keyser in 1912; the other paper had begun as the West Virginia Tribune, published in New Creek, West Virginia, in 1870. Gannett sold the newspaper in 2022 to NCWV Media.
