= Woodland, Maryland =

- Census-designated place
- Location within the State of Maryland Woodland (the United States)
- Coordinates: 39°36′30″N 78°57′00″W
- Country: United States
- State: Maryland
- County: Allegany

Area
  - Total: 0.20 sq mi (0.51 km^{2})
  - Land: 0.20 sq mi (0.51 km^{2})
  - Water: 0 sq mi (0.00 km^{2})
- Elevation: 1,805 ft (550 m)

Population (2020)
  - Total: 91
  - Density: 462.7/sq mi (178.66/km^{2})
- Time zone: UTC−5 (Eastern (EST))
  - Summer (DST): UTC−4 (EDT)
- ZIP code: 21532
- Area codes: 240 and 301
- FIPS code: 24-86275
- GNIS feature ID: 2583705

Woodland is an unincorporated community and census-designated place (CDP) in Allegany County, Maryland, United States. As of the 2010 census it had a population of 113. It is located 4 miles (6 km) south of Frostburg and just east of the community called Klondike.

Woodland started as a coal town sometime around the beginning of the 20th century. Many years ago, the town had a community church and a convenience store. Both buildings have since been converted into residences.

== Demographics ==
Historical population
Census	Pop.	Note	%±
2020	91		—
U.S. Decennial Census
