= WQZK-FM =

Radio station in Keyser, West Virginia

Keyser, West Virginia; United States
- Broadcast area: Cumberland Metro
- Frequency: 94.1 MHz
- Branding: 94-1 QZK

Programming
- Language: English
- Format: Contemporary hit radio
- Affiliations: Premiere Networks; Skyview Networks

Ownership
- Owner: WVRC Media; (Starcast Systems, Inc.)
- Sister stations: WCMD; WDYK; WDZN; WKLP; WVMD

History
- First air date: September 15, 1973
- Former call signs: WKLP-FM (1973–1981)

Technical information
- Licensing authority: FCC
- Facility ID: 62339
- Class: B
- ERP: 13,000 watts
- HAAT: 283 meters (928 ft)
- Transmitter coordinates: 39°25′7.0″N 78°57′15.0″W
- Translator: 102.1 W271AT (Cumberland)

Links
- Public license information: Public file; LMS
- Webcast: Listen live; Listen live (via Audacy)
- Website: 941qzk.com

WQZK-FM (94.1 MHz) is a contemporary hit radio formatted broadcast commercial radio station licensed to Keyser, West Virginia, serving the Cumberland Metro area. WQZK-FM is owned and operated by WVRC Media.

== Booster Station ==
In addition to the main station, WQZK-FM is relayed by an FM booster station to cover the downtown areas of Cumberland and Frostburg, along with the immediate surrounding areas.

| Call sign | Frequency | City of license | FID | ERP (W) | HAAT | Class | FCC info |
|---|---|---|---|---|---|---|---|
| WQZK-FM1 | 94.1 FM | Cumberland, Maryland | 197845 | 6,000 | −25 m (−82 ft) | D | LMS |
