= WVMD =

- Romney, West Virginia; United States
- Broadcast area: Cumberland Metro
- Frequency: 100.1 MHz
- Branding: 100.1 The Wolf

Programming
- Language: English
- Format: Country music
- Affiliations: Compass Media Networks; Westwood One

Ownership
- Owner: WVRC Media; (West Virginia Radio Corporation of the Alleghenies)
- Sister stations: WCMD; WDYK; WDZN; WKLP; WQZK-FM

History
- First air date: 1988
- Former call signs: WPBB (1985–1988); WJJB (1988–1998); WDZN (1998–2012)

Technical information
- Licensing authority: FCC
- Facility ID: 10657
- Class: A
- ERP: 900 watts
- HAAT: 251 meters (823 ft)
- Transmitter coordinates: 39°25′20.0″N 78°47′25.0″W
- Translators: 99.9 W260BP (Cumberland, Maryland)

Links
- Public license information: Public file; LMS
- Webcast: Listen Live
- Website: www.tristateswolf.com

WVMD (100.1 FM) is a country music-formatted broadcast radio station licensed to Romney, West Virginia, serving the Cumberland Metro area. WVMD is owned by WVRC Media.

== History ==
The genesis of WVMD was WPBB, originally intended as a service for the blind. It was founded by Martin John Fenik and Peter Keim Hons of Pisces Broadcasting in 1984. WVMD was formerly WJJB and played an adult contemporary format under the name "Jib 100". Their top-of-the-hour ID would be as follows: "WJJB-FM...Romney, West Virginia...", followed by the striking of a ship's bell that would tell the time at that hour. The "Jib" name and the bells on-the-hour were due in part to the owner, at that time, being a former sailor. WJJB switched their call letters to WDZN and their format to Radio Disney on September 4, 1998. WVMD also broadcasts on translator W260BP, on 99.9 FM, for Downtown Cumberland, where WVMD's main signal is blocked by the many hills.

WVMD was owned by Charter Equities, Inc. until March 2007, when it was sold to Grandview Media, LLC. WVMD's studios are located in Downtown Cumberland.

In May 2011, Grandview Media, LLC sold the then-WDZN and translator W260BP to West Virginia Radio Corporation for $220,000. On July 15, 2011, WDZN switched to active rock as "Z100".

On August 10, 2012, the station changed its call sign to WVMD and its format to country music as part of a swap with its Midland, Maryland-based sister station, 99.5 FM.
