= Arion Band =

Community band based in Maryland, US

The Arion Band is one of the oldest community bands in the United States, based in Frostburg, Maryland, established in 1877. Its current director is Dr. Ronald Horner, professor of percussion at Frostburg State University, and its current president is Todd Logsdon. The band rehearses at the historic Arion Band Hall (built in 1895) on Uhl Street in Frostburg and typically gives 5-10 performances in the Frostburg and Cumberland area during the summer.

The band's namesake, the legendary Corinthian musician Arion, was the "Jolly Mon" of ancient Greece; he was rescued by dolphins after pirates threw him overboard.

A group of German-Americans in Frostburg founded the German Arion Band in 1877. During the anti-German hysteria of World War II, the band changed its name from the German Arion Band to the Frostburg Arion Band. The band long since stopped relying exclusively on German-Americans, though that ethnicity still abounds in the region. Today the band's membership numbers between 30 and 40 players. Members of the band range in age from 14 to 80. The band's membership comes from local citizens and students, including several members of the Frostburg State University marching band.

In the late 19th and early 20th centuries, many U.S. town and cities had at least one community brass band, peopled by shopkeepers and farmers and children; it was the era saluted in Meredith Willson's musical The Music Man. In towns with substantial immigrant populations, it was not unusual to have one German-American band, one Italian-American band, etc. Most community bands disappeared in the late 20th century.
