= WDYK =

- Ridgeley, West Virginia; United States
- Broadcast area: Cumberland Metro
- Frequency: 100.5 MHz (HD Radio)
- Branding: Magic 100.5

Programming
- Format: Adult contemporary
- Affiliations: Compass Media Networks; Premiere Networks

Ownership
- Owner: WVRC Media; (West Virginia Radio Corporation of the Alleghenies)
- Sister stations: WCMD, WDZN, WKLP, WQZK-FM, WVMD

History
- First air date: 2006

Technical information
- Licensing authority: FCC
- Facility ID: 164255
- Class: A
- ERP: 6,000 watts
- HAAT: 100 meters
- Transmitter coordinates: 39°43′3.0″N 78°42′42.0″W

Links
- Public license information: Public file; LMS
- Webcast: Listen live
- Website: www.cumberlandsmagic.com

WDYK (100.5 FM) is an adult contemporary formatted radio station licensed to Ridgeley, West Virginia, and serving the Cumberland Metro area. WDYK is owned and operated by WVRC Media.
