= Borden Mines Superintendent's House =

Historic house in Maryland

- U.S. National Register of Historic Places
- Location within Maryland Location within the United States
- Location: Mt. Savage Road (MD 36), Frostburg, Maryland
- Coordinates: 39°39′55″N 78°55′21″W
- Area: 2.8 acres (1.1 ha)
- Built: 1850
- Architectural style: Italian Villa
- NRHP reference No.: 84001322
- Added to NRHP: March 22, 1984

The Borden Mines Superintendent's House was built in 1850 in Frostburg, Allegany County, Maryland. The Italianate style villa was built for Albert C. Green, first superintendent of the Borden Mining Company, one of the oldest mining companies in the United States. The frame house, with its three-story tower was one of the first of this style to appear in Allegany County.
