= WCBC-FM =

Keyser, West Virginia; United States
- Broadcast area: Cumberland Metro
- Frequency: 107.1 MHz
- Branding: Classic Hits 107.1

Programming
- Language: English
- Format: Classic hits
- Affiliations: ABC News Radio; Baltimore Ravens; Motor Racing Network; Performance Racing Network

Ownership
- Owner: Cumberland Broadcasting Corporation; (Prosperitas Broadcasting System, LP)
- Sister stations: WCBC

History
- First air date: 1990
- Former call signs: WKZG (1986–1994)
- Call sign meaning: Cumberland Broadcasting Corporation

Technical information
- Licensing authority: FCC
- Facility ID: 53671
- Class: A
- ERP: 480 watts
- HAAT: 253.1 meters (830 ft)
- Transmitter coordinates: 39°31′30.0″N 78°51′43.0″W

Links
- Public license information: Public file; LMS

WCBC-FM (107.1 MHz) is a classic hits formatted broadcast commercial FM radio station licensed to Keyser, West Virginia, serving the Cumberland Metro area. WCBC-FM is owned and operated by Cumberland Broadcasting Corporation.

== History ==
WCBC-FM began in 1990, as WKZG, always owned by Cumberland Broadcasting Corporation. The call letters were changed in 1994, to WCBC-FM, to match sister station WCBC 1270 AM. Previously, the WCBC-FM call letters were used between 1963 and 1969 by a Christian radio station in Baltimore, broadcasting on 105.7 MHz. The call letters stood for "Christian Broadcasting Company" and the station also used the advertising slogan "Where Christ Brings Comfort". That frequency is now WJZ-FM's in Baltimore.

== Sports coverage ==
WCBC-FM is also the home of NASCAR Nationwide Series, Camping World Truck Series, and Sprint Cup racing. WCBC carries all races from MRN Radio and PRN Radio, plus most (if not all) MRN and PRN programming.

== Translator information ==
WCBC-FM had a translator in Cumberland on 99.5 FM. The 99.5 signal was supplanted by the new, full-power station WVMD in April 2008.
