= WZTM =

Radio station in Frostburg, Maryland

- Frostburg, Maryland; United States
- Broadcast area: Cumberland Metro
- Frequency: 97.1 MHz
- Branding: Truth FM

Programming
- Language: English
- Format: Contemporary worship music

Ownership
- Owner: Solid Foundation Broadcasting Corporation

History
- First air date: October 1989
- Former call signs: WLIC (1989–2024)

Technical information
- Licensing authority: FCC
- Facility ID: 26529
- Class: A
- ERP: 140 watts
- HAAT: 390 meters (1,280 ft)
- Transmitter coordinates: 39°36′6.0″N 78°53′14.0″W

Links
- Public license information: Public file; LMS
- Webcast: Listen live
- Website: www.truthfm.net/on-air/frostburg-md-97-1/

WZTM (97.1 MHz) is a contemporary worship music formatted broadcast FM radio station licensed to Frostburg, Maryland, serving Cumberland Metro area. WZTM is owned and operated by Solid Foundation Broadcasting Corporation.
