= WFRB-FM =

- Frostburg, Maryland; United States
- Broadcast area: Cumberland Metro
- Frequency: 105.3 MHz
- RDS: PI: 6397; PTY: Country; RT: Now Playing: Title by Artist
- Branding: Big Froggy 105-3 and 105-7

Programming
- Language: English
- Format: Country music
- Affiliations: Country Top 40 with Fitz; United Stations Radio Networks; Westwood One

Ownership
- Owner: Forever Media; (FM Radio Licenses, LLC)
- Sister stations: WFRB; WRQE; WTBO

History
- First air date: October 1, 1965
- Call sign meaning: Frostburg

Technical information
- Licensing authority: FCC
- Facility ID: 71869
- Class: B
- ERP: 13,500 watts
- HAAT: 292 meters (958 ft)
- Transmitter coordinates: 39°41′0.40″N 78°57′55.00″W
- Translator: 105.7 W289BR (Cumberland)

Links
- Public license information: Public file; LMS
- Webcast: Listen live
- Website: www.forevercumberland.com/big-froggy-105-3/

WFRB-FM (105.3 MHz) is a country music formatted broadcast commercial radio station licensed to Frostburg, Maryland, serving the Cumberland Metro area. WFRB-FM is owned and operated by Forever Media.
