= William Keyser =

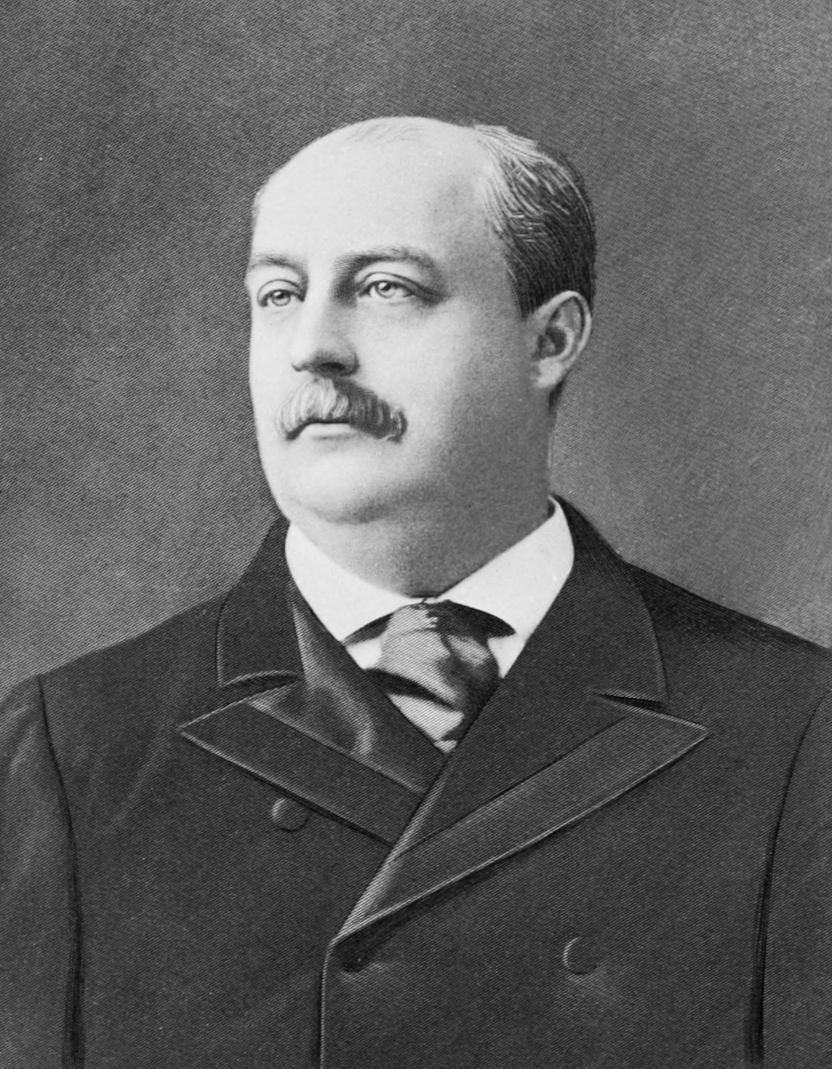
- Born: William Leigh Keyser; November 23, 1835; Baltimore, Maryland
- Died: June 3, 1904 (aged 68); Reisterstown, Maryland
- Burial place: Green Mount Cemetery
- Occupation: Industrialist
- Spouse: Mary Hoke Brent (m. 1858)
- Children: 3

Signature
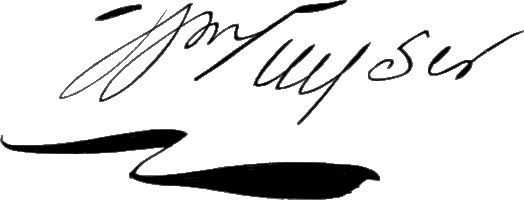

William Leigh Keyser (November 23, 1835 – June 3, 1904) was an executive of the Baltimore and Ohio Railroad (B&O) and the Baltimore Copper Company.

== Early life ==
Keyser was born in Baltimore, Maryland on November 23, 1835, the son of Samuel Stouffer Keyser and Elizabeth (née Wyman) Keyser. He was educated at various private schools in Baltimore, and entered St. Timothy's Academy in Catonsville, Maryland in 1846. He and his twin brother, Samuel, remained there until 1850, when their father's declining health and weakening financial situation made it necessary for the boys to leave school. Samuel eventually moved to New York City to make his way in business there, while William stayed in Baltimore to manage his father's warehouses.

== Career ==
In 1857, William formed a partnership with his other brother, Irvine Keyser under the name "Keyser Brothers". He was active in the firm, as well as the Abbott Iron Co. and the Baltimore Copper Company, throughout the 1860s.

=== Baltimore and Ohio Railroad ===
In 1870, William Keyser became involved with the Baltimore and Ohio Railroad, taking a position as second vice-president during the term of its president, John Work Garrett. The town of Keyser, West Virginia was named for him. While at the B&O, he was instrumental in labor negotiations during the 1871 and 1877 railroad workers strikes. In 1881, Keyser left the B&O. His action was precipitated by Garrett's decision to promote his son, Robert Garrett, over Keyser.

=== Baltimore Copper Company ===
Keyser next ventured into copper manufacturing. In 1882, the court appointed him to oversee the financial affairs of Pope and Cole, a local copper processor. The company had declared bankruptcy, and Keyser, as one of their largest creditors, had a vested interest in seeing them regain solvency. His association with Pope and Cole piqued his interest in the copper industry. He eventually reestablished Pope & Cole as the Baltimore Copper Company and purchased the Baltimore Smelting and Rolling Company. His entry into copper production allowed him to amass a fortune larger than if he had stayed with the railroad.

=== Philanthropy ===
Keyser put his money to many philanthropic uses. He donated funds for a hall at Hannah More Academy in Reisterstown, and was instrumental in the founding of Johns Hopkins University's Homewood campus. In November 1894, Daniel Coit Gilman, the university's first president, asked Keyser for his help in securing another site for the school, which was outgrowing its location in downtown Baltimore. In early 1901, Keyser and his brother Samuel offered 179 acres to the university with the condition that "at least 30 acres of the property be given to the city for use as a public park", which then became Wyman Park. Material in the Keyser-Wyman Papers recounts his association with his cousin, William Wyman, who donated a large portion on the land, and their efforts on behalf of the university.

Before his death in June 1904, Keyser was appointed a member of the Citizens' Emergency Committee which was charged with developing a plan for rebuilding the downtown after the calamitous Baltimore fire of February 1904. The Committee prepared street and dock improvement plans, which were adopted.

== Personal life ==
On November 11, 1858, he married Mary Hoke "Mollie" Brent (1838–1911), daughter of the well-known Baltimore lawyer, Robert Brent. In Baltimore, they lived in a home designed by prominent architect T. Henry Randall, and were the parents of three children who lived to adulthood:

- Robert Brent Keyser (1859–1927), who married Ellen Cary McHenry, a daughter of James Howard McHenry (a grandson of Secretary of War James McHenry). He served as Chairman of the Board of Trustees of Johns Hopkins University from 1903 until shortly before his death in 1927.
- Mathilde Lawrence Keyser (1870–1929), who married William Maurice Manly, the widow of Frances Howell Hughes Kennedy (eldest granddaughter of U.S. Senator Anthony Kennedy) in 1902.
- William Keyser Jr. (1871–1936), who married Jean Hancy, a daughter of Edward Johnson Hancy.

Keyser died suddenly as a brain aneurysm burst at his summer home, Brentwood, in Reistertown on June 3, 1904. Within days of his death, his twin brother Samuel was "lying ill at his residence" in New York and his nephew, Henry R. Keyser (son of his brother H. Irvine Keyser) died from meningitis at his country home near Chatelane. After a funeral at the Christ Protestant Episcopal Church, Keyser was buried in Baltimore's Green Mount Cemetery. His widow died seven years later on October 29, 1911. At the time of his death, he was reportedly the wealthiest man in Maryland.

=== Descendants ===
Through his son R. Brent, he was a grandfather of three: Juliana Brent Keyser (wife of Gaylord Lee Clark), Ellen McHenry Keyser (wife of Ambassador James Cabell Bruce, son of U.S. Senator William Cabell Bruce and brother of David K. E. Bruce), and William McHenry Keyser.

=== Legacy ===
The city of Keyser, West Virginia is named for William Keyser.
