= Frostburg Historic District =

Historic district in Maryland, United States

- U.S. National Register of Historic Places
- U.S. Historic district
- Location within Maryland Location within the United States
- Location: Western RR, Mt. Pleasant Terr., Main, Frost, Water, Broadway, Bealls, and Fairview Sts., Frostburg, Maryland
- Coordinates: 39°39′25″N 78°55′39″W
- Area: 125 acres (51 ha)
- Architect: Multiple
- Architectural style: Late 19th And 20th Century Revivals, Late Victorian, Commercial-Functional
- NRHP reference No.: 83002918
- Added to NRHP: September 8, 1983

The Frostburg Historic District is a national historic district in Frostburg, Allegany County, Maryland. It comprises 356 resources within the city of Frostburg, along U.S. Route 40, which forms the main axis of the district. Included are a collection of early-20th century commercial buildings, primarily of brick construction, two or three stories tall, and a collection of mid- to late-19th and early-20th century homes reflecting a variety of architectural styles, including Italianate, Second Empire, Queen Anne, and Colonial Revival.

It was listed on the National Register of Historic Places in 1983.
