= WCBC (AM) =

Coordinates: 39°40′28″N 78°46′48″W

- Cumberland, Maryland; United States
- Broadcast area: Cumberland Metro
- Frequency: 1270 kHz
- Branding: 1270 WCBC

Programming
- Language: English
- Format: Full service talk radio
- Affiliations: Fox News Radio; Allegany College of Maryland; Pittsburgh Pirates; Premiere Networks; Washington Commanders; Westwood One

Ownership
- Owner: Cumberland Broadcasting Corporation
- Sister stations: WCBC-FM

History
- First air date: June 24, 1953
- Call sign meaning: Cumberland Broadcasting Corporation

Technical information
- Licensing authority: FCC
- Facility ID: 14717
- Class: B
- Power: 5,000 watts (day); 1,000 watts (night)
- Translator: 103.1 W276DQ (Cumberland)

Links
- Public license information: Public file; LMS
- Webcast: Listen live
- Website: www.wcbcradio.com

WCBC (1270 kHz) is a AM radio station that serves the greater area of Cumberland Metro. WCBC provides news coverage: locally, regionally, and nationally; weather forecasts; participation in major community events to promote the area and its organizations by way of remote broadcasts and community service announcements.

WCBC's programming includes the long running Dave Norman Morning Program, and network affiliations with ABC Radio Network (Network news and Sean Hannity), the Westwood One Radio Network (Jim Bohannon), Dave Ramsey, Mark Levin, Premiere Networks (Coast to Coast AM with George Noory), Talk Radio Network (Laura Ingraham and Michael Savage), and the Focus on the Family Radio Network.

The station's sports programming includes coverage of local high school football and basketball, Allegany College of Maryland basketball, and West Virginia University football and basketball, Washington Commanders football, and area little league baseball.

WCBC also has an FM sister station, WCBC-FM at 107.1 in Keyser, West Virginia, playing a classic hits format.

== History ==
The station was founded in 1953, as WKYR, licensed to Keyser, West Virginia. In 1965, the station was granted full-time status and changed its city of license to Cumberland. In 1976, the call letters became WCBC.

== Lawsuit against Allegany County schools ==
On August 28, 2007, Cumberland Broadcasting Corporation, the owners and operators of WCBC-AM-FM, and "the Maryland Delaware DC Broadcasters Association filed a lawsuit in the United States District Court in Baltimore against each member of the Allegany County Board of Education, and the Superintendent of Allegany County Schools, Bill AuMiller", according to the WCBC (AM) website.

The reason for the lawsuit is "that the Board of Education has acted to deny WCBC its First Amendment rights", again quoting the WCBC website.

"Following criticism of the Board’s actions, WCBC was denied access to information provided to other media, denied access to press boxes at county schools, and denied information that would enable it to participate in a Board-endorsed scholarship program".

On August 31, 2007, the Allegany County Board of Education offered an olive branch to WCBC and would again allow WCBC access to information, press boxes, etc. as it was prior to August 17, 2007, letter from the BOE which took those services away.

According to a September 15, 2007, AP/WJZ-TV report:

A Cumberland radio station will be able to broadcast high school football games while it fights a decision by the Allegany County school board denying access to the games.

A federal judge in Baltimore granted the temporary injunction requested by WCBC-AM.

The judge ruled the station's constitutional rights were violated by the ban, and the public would be served by an injunction.

The station claims the board's ban on access to a stadium press box was a result of unflattering news stories about the county schools.

In one story, a reporter was able to walk into five county schools without being questioned.

Allegany High School Attorneys says an agreement last week by the parties to seek mediation fell apart.

So, despite the previous "WCBC/BOE Agreement" signed on August 31, 2007, WCBC's lawsuit against the Allegany County (of Maryland) Board of Education remains in the courts.
