= Hocking House =

Historic house in Maryland, United States

- U.S. National Register of Historic Places
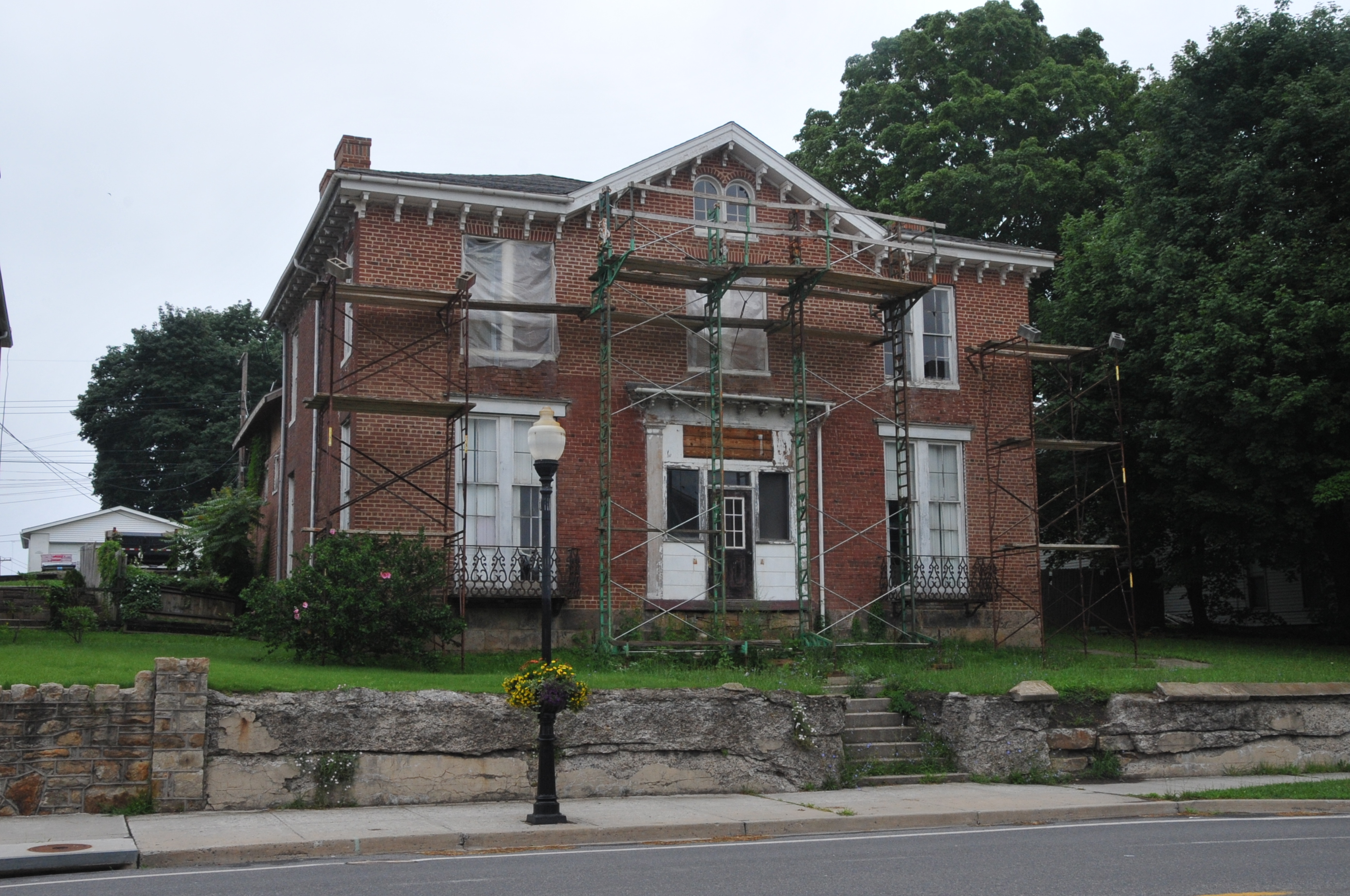

- Location within Maryland Location within the United States
- Location: 144 E. Main St., Frostburg, Maryland
- Coordinates: 39°39′19″N 78°55′27″W
- Area: less than one acre
- Built: 1855
- Architectural style: Greek Revival, Italianate
- NRHP reference No.: 82001579
- Added to NRHP: December 2, 1982

Hocking House is a historic home in Frostburg, Allegany County, Maryland, United States. It is a 2 1/2-story, three-bay, hip-roofed dwelling, built about 1855 in the transitional Greek Revival-Italianate architecture style. The land on which the home stands was part of the estate of Robert Clarke Sr., one of the original settlers of the area that is now Frostburg. It was converted into a clubhouse in 1942.

Hocking House was listed on the National Register of Historic Places in 1982.
