= WRQE =

- Cumberland, Maryland; United States
- Broadcast area: Cumberland Metro
- Frequency: 106.1 MHz
- RDS: PI: 8330; PTY: Classic Rock; RT: Now Playing: Title by Artist
- Branding: Rocky 106-1

Programming
- Language: English
- Format: Classic rock
- Affiliations: United Stations Radio Networks; Westwood One

Ownership
- Owner: Forever Media; (FM Radio Licenses, LLC)
- Sister stations: WFRB; WFRB-FM; WTBO

History
- First air date: 1962
- Former call signs: WTBO-FM (1962–1968); WKGO (1968–2016)
- Call sign meaning: similar to "Rocky"

Technical information
- Licensing authority: FCC
- Facility ID: 74083
- Class: B
- Power: 5,400 watts
- HAAT: 430 meters (1,410 ft)
- Transmitter coordinates: 39°34′54.0″N 78°53′58.0″W

Links
- Public license information: Public file; LMS
- Webcast: Listen live
- Website: www.forevercumberland.com/rocky-106/

WRQE (106.1 MHz) is a classic rock formatted broadcast commercial FM radio station licensed to Cumberland, Maryland, serving Cumberland Metro area. WRQE is owned and operated by Forever Media, through licensee FM Radio Licenses, LLC.

Previous logo
