= WCRH =

Coordinates: 39.660°N 77.965°W

- Hagerstown, Maryland; United States
- Broadcast area: Hagerstown metropolitan area; Cumberland metropolitan area; Frederick County
- Frequency: 90.5 MHz (HD Radio)
- RDS: 90.5WCRH THE COMPASS
- Branding: 90.5 The Compass

Programming
- Format: Christian radio
- Subchannels: HD2: Southern gospel
- Affiliations: Mission Network News; Moody Radio; SRN News

Ownership
- Owner: Cedar Ridge Ministries

History
- First air date: July 25, 1976

Technical information
- Licensing authority: FCC
- Facility ID: 9723
- Class: B
- ERP: 10,000 watts
- HAAT: 268 meters (879 ft)

Links
- Public license information: Public file; LMS
- Website: wcrh.org

WCRH (90.5 MHz) is a non-commercial Christian radio station airing contemporary Christian music and Christian talk and teaching. The station is licensed to Hagerstown, Maryland and is owned by Cedar Ridge Ministries.

Broadcast translators for WCRH
Call sign	Frequency	City of license	FID	ERP (W)	HAAT	Class	FCC info
W273BP	102.5 FM	Newville, Pennsylvania	141639	55	−40 m (−131 ft)	D	LMS
W278BL	103.5 FM	Cumberland, Etc., Maryland	9724	10	415 m (1,362 ft)	D	LMS
W216CM	91.1 FM	Frederick, Maryland	9725	6		D	LMS
