= WCMD (AM) =

Coordinates: 39°38′38.3″N 78°44′31.1″W

- Cumberland, Maryland; United States
- Broadcast area: Cumberland, Maryland; Frostburg, Maryland
- Frequency: 1230 kHz
- Branding: WCMD 102.1 FM 1230 AM

Programming
- Format: News/talk/sports
- Affiliations: West Virginia MetroNews; ESPN Radio

Ownership
- Owner: WVRC Media; (West Virginia Radio Corporation)
- Sister stations: WQZK-FM; WDYK; WDZN; WKLP; WVMD

History
- First air date: 1948
- Former call signs: WDYK (1946–1956); WCUM (1956–1977); WCMD (1977–1982); WALI (1982–1994); WNTR (1994–2005)
- Call sign meaning: Cumberland, Maryland

Technical information
- Licensing authority: FCC
- Facility ID: 49381
- Class: C
- Power: 1,000 watts
- Translator: 102.1 W271AT (Cumberland)

Links
- Public license information: Public file; LMS

WCMD is a news/talk/sports formatted broadcast radio station licensed to Cumberland, Maryland, serving the Cumberland/Frostburg area. WCMD is owned and operated by WVRC Media. It simulcasts on 1230 AM and 102.1 FM, a translator station, W271AT.

On May 17, 2021, WCMD changed its format from ESPN Radio sports to news/talk and sports.

== Sale of station ==
In late April 2008, Broadcast Communications, Inc. sold WCMD to West Virginia Radio Corporation for $350,000. The sale of WCMD was possibly due to Broadcast Communications, Inc.'s intention to move WROG to Chambersburg, Pennsylvania.

== Previous formats ==
On August 4, 2008, under its new ownership by West Virginia Radio Corporation, WCMD switched its adult standards format to become an affiliate of ESPN Radio. This marked a return to the talk/sports radio format it had in the late 1990s/early 2000s as an evening/weekend affiliate of One on One Sports/Sporting News Radio.

Prior to One on One Sports, the station aired inexpensive talk shows. After Sporting News Radio, it switched formats several times, trying smooth jazz, classic country, and Adult standards respectively. During the 1970s under the callsign WCUM, it had Top-40 and adult contemporary formats. For a while starting in 1974–75, the station moved to an automation system and simulcast with then-sister station WCUM-FM, later WROG. In its heyday as a Top 40 station, it used the slogan "The Fun One".
