= WKYW-LP =

- Keyser, West Virginia; United States
- Frequency: 102.9 MHz
- Branding: Mountain Streams Radio

Programming
- Format: Variety

Ownership
- Owner: Mineral County Travel, Tourism, Convention and Visitors Bureau, Ltd.

Technical information
- Licensing authority: FCC
- Facility ID: 195768
- Class: L1
- ERP: 100 watts
- HAAT: −166 metres (−545 ft)
- Transmitter coordinates: 39°26′15″N 78°58′49″W

Links
- Public license information: LMS
- Website: Official Website

WKYW-LP (102.9 FM) is a radio station licensed to serve the community of Keyser, West Virginia. The station is owned by Mineral County Travel, Tourism, Convention and Visitors Bureau, Ltd. It airs a variety radio format. The station's studios are located on the campus of Potomac State College of West Virginia University.

The station was assigned the WKYW-LP call letters by the Federal Communications Commission on May 22, 2014.
