= Klondike, Maryland =

- Census-designated place
- Location within the State of Maryland Klondike (the United States)
- Coordinates: 39°36′37″N 78°57′47″W
- Country: United States
- State: Maryland
- County: Allegany

Area
  - Total: 0.39 sq mi (1.01 km^{2})
  - Land: 0.39 sq mi (1.01 km^{2})
  - Water: 0 sq mi (0.00 km^{2})
- Elevation: 1,887 ft (575 m)

Population (2020)
  - Total: 103
  - Density: 262.9/sq mi (101.52/km^{2})
- Time zone: UTC-5 (Eastern (EST))
  - Summer (DST): UTC-4 (EDT)
- ZIP code: 21532
- Area codes: 240 and 301
- FIPS code: 24-44525
- GNIS feature ID: 2583646

Klondike is an unincorporated community and census-designated place (CDP) in Allegany County, Maryland, United States. As of the 2010 census it had a population of 118.

It is located in western Allegany County, 5 miles (8 km) southwest of Frostburg, at the foot of Big Savage Mountain. It is built at the site of the Klondike Mine, The Consolidation Coal Company's Mine No. 17.

== Demographics ==
Historical population
Census	Pop.	Note	%±
2020	103		—
U.S. Decennial Census
