= Allegany Freeman =

- Type: Daily newspaper
- Format: Broadsheet
- Publisher: Samuel Magill
- Editor: Frederick A. Wise
- Founded: 1813
- Ceased publication: 1818
- Headquarters: Cumberland, Maryland

The Allegany Freeman was a Maryland newspaper that was published weekly out of Cumberland, Maryland from 1813 until 1818 under publisher S. Magill.

== Location ==
Cumberland is a city in Allegany County, Maryland in the western part of the state. Abstract information from the newspaper can be found using F. Edward Wright's Newspaper Abstracts of Allegany and Washington Counties 1811- 1815.

Repositories that have access to the newspaper include the Maryland Historical Society and the Maryland State Archives.

Charles Brigham cites the newspaper's publisher as Samuel Magill from the first issue which is from December 11, 1813, vol. 1 no. 4. From that same edition Brigham also cites that Magill established the newspaper on November 20, 1813. According to Brigham the newspaper's editor is given as Frederick A. Wise, whose name was referenced in a list of Maryland newspapers in the Niles' Weekly Register of December 27, 1817. The "Maryland Republican" on March 7, 1818, noted that the paper was to be "relinquished" with the issue of February 28, 1818.

== Sources ==
- Brigham, Charles (1947). History and Bibliography of American Newspapers 1690-1820. American Antiquarian Society printed at the Harvard University Printing Office.
