= M. Virginia Rosenbaum =

American surveyor and journalist

- Born: September 3, 1921; Suffolk, Virginia
- Died: May 4, 2005 (aged 83)
- Occupation(s): Maryland county surveyor, journalist
- Spouse: Fred James Rosenbaum
- Children: Frances Kay Bowersox
- Parents: John Fike (father); Mildred Heinbaugh Fike (mother)

M. Virginia Rosenbaum (born M. Virginia Fike) (1921–2005) was Maryland's first female county surveyor and a member of the Maryland Society of Surveyors. For a short time she worked as a copy writer and eventually became the manager of WTBO radio station in Cumberland, Maryland. In 1961 Rosenbaum purchased a local Allegany County, Maryland, newspaper, The Allegany Citizen, renamed it to The Citizen, and edited and published the weekly paper for 28 years.

== Early life ==
M. Virginia Fike was born on September 3, 1921, in Suffolk, Virginia, to parents John and Mildred Fike. She attended Ursuline Academy, now known as The Woods Academy, in Bethesda, Maryland, and then went on to attend Strayer's Business College, now known as Strayer University.

== Career ==
Prior to her time as a county surveyor, Rosenbaum worked briefly as a real estate broker and also as a paralegal. During her career as a journalist, she worked first for the Henry J. Kaufman Advertising Agency in Washington, D.C., then from 1942 to 1945 worked at the WTBO radio station.

One of her longest and most involved career endeavors began when she purchased The Allegany Citizen newspaper and, after renaming it to The Citizen, entered her position as editor and publisher. Rosenbaum continued to edit and publish the paper until 1983, after which she opened her own surveying business.

During her time as editor, Rosenbaum was introduced to the concept of fluoridation and became convinced of its dangers, dedicating most of her life to advocating for pure drinking water in Maryland. Over the course of her life, she led seven successful campaigns to purify Maryland's water supply and promoted an anti-fluoridation agenda in her paper, becoming known as a figurehead for the movement. She is quoted in a Baltimore Sun article from 2000 insisting that fluoride is "deadly poison."
