= Keyser, West Virginia =

- City
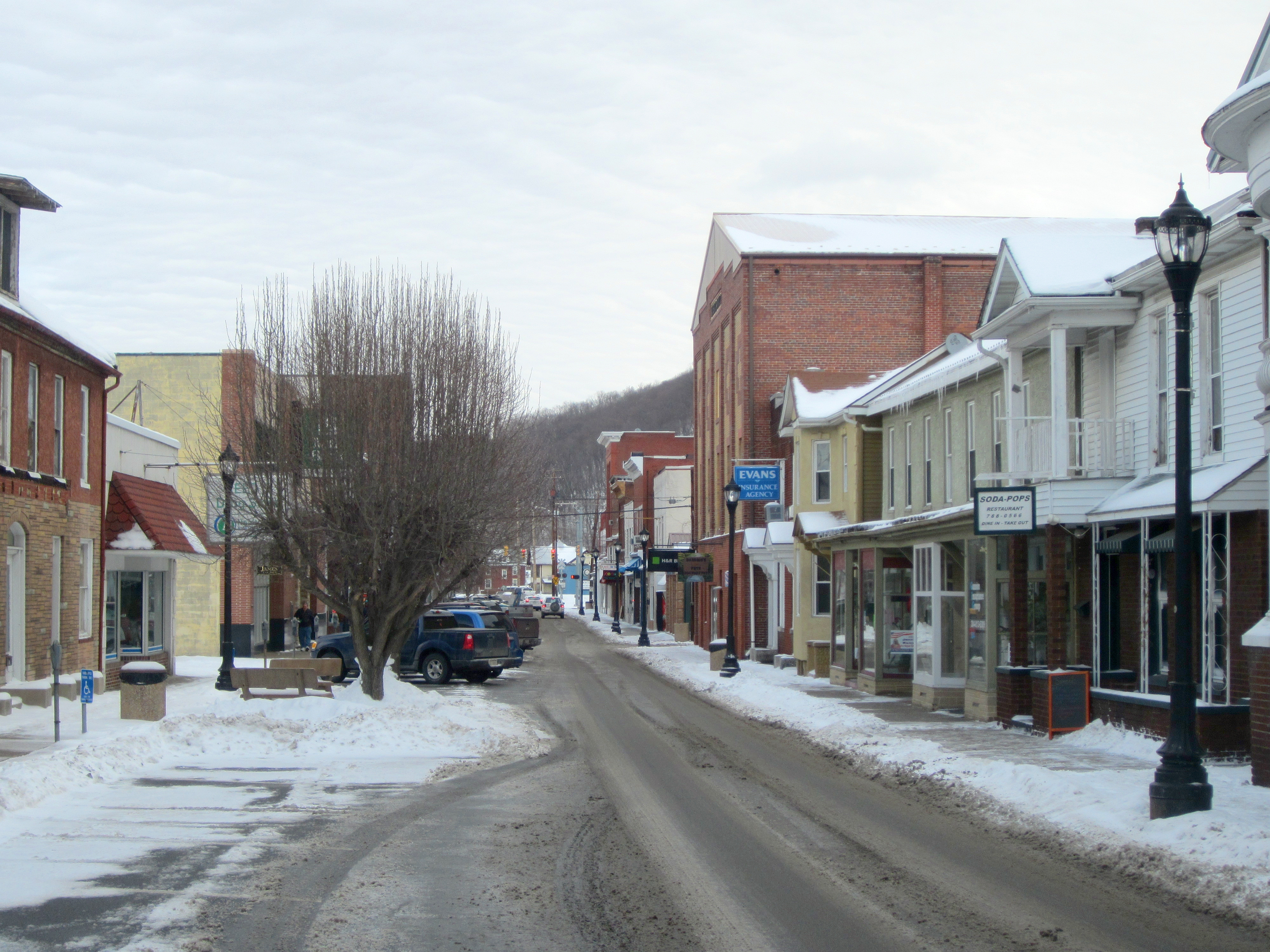
- Downtown Keyser in January 2014
- Nickname: Friendliest City in the USA
- Interactive map of Keyser, West Virginia
- Location within West Virginia Location within the United States
- Coordinates: 39°26′22″N 78°58′56″W
- Country: United States
- State: West Virginia
- County: Mineral
- Incorporated/Chartered: 1874/1913

Government
  - Type: Mayor-council government
  - Mayor: Damon Tillman
  - Council Members: Jennifer Junkins; Jim Hannas; Billy Meek; Mike Ryan; Teddy Nester

Area
  - Total: 1.98 sq mi (5.12 km^{2})
  - Land: 1.98 sq mi (5.12 km^{2})
  - Water: 0 sq mi (0.00 km^{2})
- Elevation: 968 ft (295 m)

Population (2020)
  - Total: 4,864
  - Density: 2,488.4/sq mi (960.77/km^{2})
- Time zone: UTC-5 (Eastern (EST))
  - Summer (DST): UTC-4 (EDT)
- ZIP Code: 26726
- Area code: 304
- FIPS code: 54-43492
- GNIS feature ID: 2390605
- Website: Official website

Keyser (/ˈkaɪ.zər/) is a city in and the county seat of Mineral County, West Virginia, United States. It is part of the Cumberland micropolitan area. The population was 4,853 at the 2020 census.

== History ==
Keyser, the county seat of Mineral County, is located on the North Branch of the Potomac River at its juncture with New Creek in the Eastern Panhandle of West Virginia. Throughout the centuries, the town went through a series of name changes, but was ultimately named after William Keyser, a Baltimore and Ohio Railroad official.

The first local land grant was issued by Lord Fairfax to Christopher Beelor on March 20, 1752. The place was first called Paddy Town or Paddytown, (Note: The post office for Keyser, West Virginia, was first established as Paddytown in 1811; reestablished as Paddy Town in 1852; then renamed New Creek Depot in 1852; then Wind Lea in 1855; then New Creek Station in 1857; and finally Keyser in 1874, when the city was incorporated. Keyser was located within Virginia until the formation of West Virginia in 1863; and it was a part of Hampshire County until the creation of Mineral County in 1866.) for Patrick McCarty, an Irish immigrant who came to then-Hampshire County, Virginia, sometime after 1740. Eventually, a community developed, which was also known as "the Irish Settlement." Initially a peaceful village, Paddy Town came under repeated attacks by Native Americans after French and Indian forces defeated Major General Edward Braddock west of Paddy Town in 1755. Patrick McCarty's son, Edward McCarty, built an iron furnace and foundry and a salt well, near present-day Armstrong Street.

In the early 19th century, the Chesapeake and Ohio Canal (C&O Canal) was constructed alongside the Potomac, from Washington, DC, to Cumberland, Maryland. Originally planned to reach the Ohio River, the canal never reached Paddy Town; after being overtaken by the railroad, the canal stopped as far west as Cumberland. By 1844, Paddy Town fell into decline, which reversed when the town received an economic boost in 1852 when the Baltimore & Ohio Railroad, in search of a path through the Alleghenies, arrived. Sometime between 1855 and the start of the Civil War, the townsfolk renamed the village New Creek Station, after the creek that runs by it.

In 1861, the American Civil War came to New Creek Station in then-Hampshire County, Virginia, when the Union established Fort Fuller. The railroad that had been a blessing to the town had turned into a curse, drawing repeated assaults by Confederate forces. Because of its geography, a relatively flat plain in a valley surrounded by mountains and open to many approaches, New Creek was an easy target for Confederates. The area changed hands 14 times during the war due to the importance of the railroad. On November 28, 1864, Confederate forces overcame Fort Fuller, then took over the town, destroying the earthworks and nearly all the buildings. A smaller Confederate force was then sent to Piedmont, where they managed to burn the Baltimore and Ohio Railroad's roundhouse, a workshop, and other machinery before they were turned away by Company A Sixth West Virginia Volunteers.

New Creek Station was also the destination of Confederate draft resisters and deserters escaping from the Shenandoah Valley. Mennonite, Church of the Brethren, and other Unionist families there hid them until guides could lead them over the mountains to New Creek, where they could board trains north or west.

Following the war, the state legislature sent the Hampshire County seat back to Romney and split this northern half away to form Mineral County in 1866, eventually settling on New Creek to become the county seat, with the courthouse completed in 1868. In 1874, the Baltimore & Ohio Railroad was looking for a place to set up division headquarters. Thus, on November 16, 1874, the town of Keyser was incorporated, named after William Keyser then the first vice president of the railroad, living in nearby Garrett County, Maryland, and in charge of the headquarters location division. In addition to the headquarters, the renamed town of Keyser received repair shops and a roundhouse, lifting employment and economic activity. Keyser played an early and prominent role in the Great Railroad Strike of 1877, attracting the attention of national news and the involvement of Federal authorities.

Keyser's growth accelerated in the 1880s, with the end of the Long Depression, through the turn of the century. Infrastructure improvements attracted more industry, and Keyser's private sector began to diversify beyond its sometimes problematic dominant employer, the Baltimore & Ohio. Besides the B&O, railroad workers were now employed by the Western Maryland Railroad and the West Virginia Central Railroad. On February 3, 1913, the West Virginia legislature granted Keyser a charter designating it the "City of Keyser" (though the name was nearly changed during WWI due to the connotations of its pronunciation as "kaiser"). In 1924, Keyser experienced massive flooding of the Potomac River, which brought widespread damage to homes and businesses.

In the 20th century, Keyser's economy relied heavily on manufacturing and the railroad. While after WWII, Keyser experienced another boom in industry, the town was hit hard by the economic crises of the 1970s and early 1980s, resulting in numerous industrial closures. Although Keyser's fortunes were generally tied to the national economy through the centuries, the town did not experience the 1990s economic boom in the same way as other parts of the country. Since losing much of its manufacturing base, the town found employment via health care, education, and service jobs. Potomac State College has continued to develop and is associated with West Virginia University.

The Thomas R. Carskadon House and Mineral County Courthouse are listed on the National Register of Historic Places.

== Geography ==
According to the U.S. Census Bureau, the city has a total area of 1.92 square miles (4.97 km^{2}), all land. It is situated in a valley on the south side of the North Branch of the Potomac River at its junction with New Creek. New Creek forms most of the eastern boundary of the town. On the immediate eastern bank of New Creek is New Creek Mountain, peaking at 1,552 feet above sea level on the eastern side of Keyser (though the long mountain itself has higher peaks far south of Keyser). On Keyser's western edge is the Allegheny Front, rising 2,631 feet above sea level at this point along its range. The northern edge of Keyser is bounded by the North Branch of the Potomac River. Immediately across the river, in McCoole, Maryland, another portion of the New Creek Mountain ridge features a massive outcropping of Oriskany or Ridgeley sandstone known as Queens Point, a popular cliff from which to take in views of Keyser. The cliff is approximately 400 feet above the river. The southern edge of Keyser is not bound by geology, as the valley here stretches farther south than the city limits. Beyond its southern limits is the unincorporated community of New Creek.

Today, Keyser's western horizon is dotted with wind turbines. The NedPower Mount Storm Wind Farm began construction in 2006, installing 132 wind turbines atop the Allegheny Front, many of them overlooking Keyser. Eventually, the wind farm reached 162 turbines, making it the largest east of the Mississippi.

Keyser's oldest section is its downtown with the 1868 courthouse and two main commercial streets: Main and Armstrong. Armstrong runs parallel to the CSX (formerly B&O) railroad tracks, across which is a neighborhood known as the North End, sandwiched between the tracks and the river, where homes were constructed beginning in the late 1910s. Not far from downtown is Fort Hill, a small hill in the center of the city crowned with the campus of Potomac State College. The south end of Keyser features a relatively newer neighborhood, on the west side of U.S. Route 220, with most of the homes built in the 1960s and 1970s, known as Airport Addition, as it was once the site of a small airfield. An area sandwiched between Airport Addition and Potomac State College is known as "Radical Hill," which was the name of Thomas Carskadon's farm in the same location, so named by Carskadon because of his self-described radical opinions. The most recent commercial development for the city has been south of the city, where shopping centers, a hotel, the new high school, and the new hospital have been constructed in recent years.

The main thoroughfares for the city are U.S. Route 220 and West Virginia Route 46. U.S. Route 220 eventually intersects with U.S. Route 50 south of Keyser. At its north end, 220 crosses the Potomac via the newly reconstructed Memorial Bridge, heading toward Cumberland, Maryland. West Virginia Route 46 enters the east side of Keyser from the direction of Fort Ashby, West Virginia, becoming Armstrong Street and then West Piedmont Street before continuing on to Piedmont, West Virginia.

=== Geology ===
The type locality of the Silurian/Devonian Keyser Formation, a limestone, is located in a quarry and roadcut east of the town.

=== Climate ===
Climate data for Keyser, West Virginia (1991–2020 normals, extremes 1996–present)
Month	Jan	Feb	Mar	Apr	May	Jun	Jul	Aug	Sep	Oct	Nov	Dec	Year
Record high °F (°C)	72 (22)	82 (28)	90 (32)	96 (36)	99 (37)	103 (39)	104 (40)	103 (39)	102 (39)	96 (36)	84 (29)	80 (27)	104 (40)
Mean daily maximum °F (°C)	39.5 (4.2)	43.8 (6.6)	53.0 (11.7)	66.5 (19.2)	75.5 (24.2)	83.9 (28.8)	88.6 (31.4)	86.5 (30.3)	79.7 (26.5)	67.4 (19.7)	54.3 (12.4)	43.3 (6.3)	65.2 (18.4)
Daily mean °F (°C)	30.1 (−1.1)	32.8 (0.4)	40.6 (4.8)	51.8 (11.0)	61.3 (16.3)	69.9 (21.1)	74.7 (23.7)	72.8 (22.7)	65.7 (18.7)	53.8 (12.1)	42.5 (5.8)	34.1 (1.2)	52.5 (11.4)
Mean daily minimum °F (°C)	20.7 (−6.3)	21.9 (−5.6)	28.2 (−2.1)	37.2 (2.9)	47.1 (8.4)	56.0 (13.3)	60.9 (16.1)	59.1 (15.1)	51.7 (10.9)	40.3 (4.6)	30.6 (−0.8)	24.9 (−3.9)	39.9 (4.4)
Record low °F (°C)	−11 (−24)	−7 (−22)	−2 (−19)	18 (−8)	28 (−2)	38 (3)	45 (7)	43 (6)	31 (−1)	20 (−7)	11 (−12)	−3 (−19)	−11 (−24)
Average precipitation inches (mm)	2.77 (70)	2.57 (65)	3.79 (96)	3.85 (98)	4.54 (115)	4.34 (110)	3.83 (97)	3.25 (83)	3.57 (91)	3.11 (79)	2.74 (70)	3.04 (77)	41.40 (1,052)
Average snowfall inches (cm)	9.6 (24)	10.3 (26)	5.5 (14)	0.2 (0.51)	0.0 (0.0)	0.0 (0.0)	0.0 (0.0)	0.0 (0.0)	0.0 (0.0)	0.2 (0.51)	1.1 (2.8)	6.6 (17)	33.5 (85)
Average precipitation days (≥ 0.01 in)	13.6	12.6	13.6	14.7	15.7	13.5	11.3	12.3	10.3	11.0	10.2	12.5	151.3
Average snowy days (≥ 0.1 in)	6.5	6.2	4.4	0.5	0.0	0.0	0.0	0.0	0.0	0.1	1.0	4.1	22.8
Source: NOAA

== Transportation ==
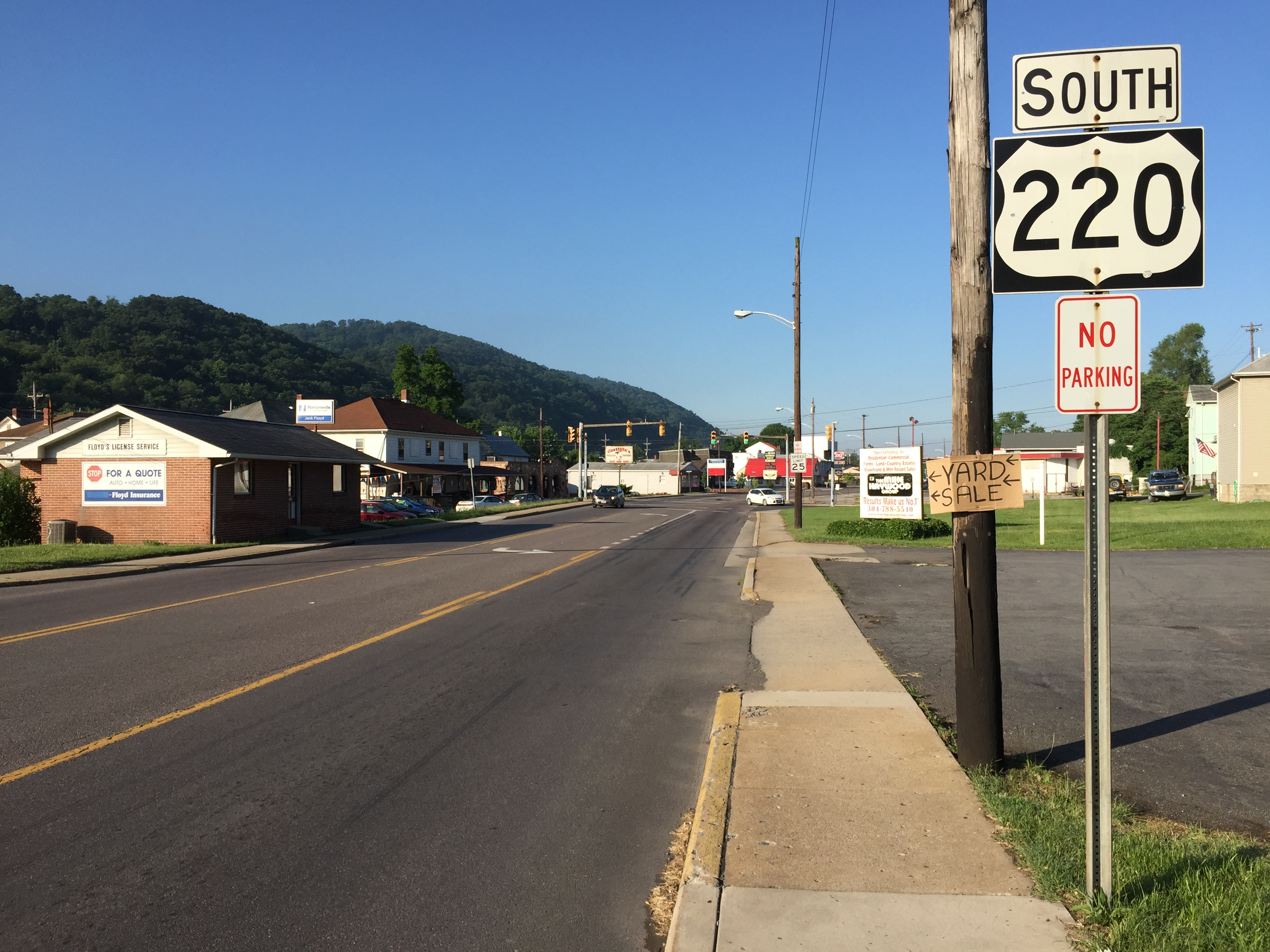
US 220 southbound in Keyser

Keyser is served by two primary highways. The most prominent of these is U.S. Route 220. From Keyser, US 220 heads north, crosses the North Branch Potomac River into Allegany County, Maryland, and continues to Cumberland and points north. Heading south, US 220 heads through Moorefield and Petersburg before crossing into Virginia. The other primary highway serving Keyser is West Virginia Route 46. From Keyser, WV 46 heads west to Piedmont and Elk Garden while to the east, WV 46 extends to Fort Ashby.

== Government ==
Keyser's government is headed by a mayor and five-member city council. Each serves four-year, staggered terms. The mayor and two council members are elected at one election, with the remaining three council members elected two years later. Elections are held on the second Tuesday in June of even-numbered years. Originally, terms were only two years long, with staggered terms and elections held every June.

Two of Keyser's longest serving mayors were John C. Freeland (1894–1967) and Irving T. Athey (1922–1997). Except for a two-year break in the 1950s due to a reelection defeat, Freeland served as mayor from 1937 until 1957. Athey was first elected in 1973 and had stints as mayor until health problems forced him to resign in 1990.

== Economy ==
As of 2016, approximately 11 percent of Keyser's workers were employed in manufacturing jobs in or around Keyser. Another 20 percent worked in health care or personal care and service. A little less than 20 percent worked in sales and food service. About 17 percent worked in a combination of education, training, administrative, and social service. The remainder of the workforce was spread across trucking, management, maintenance and repair, and other industries. The poverty rate in Keyser was 27.4 percent. Its median household income was $28,378.

Among the largest companies employing Keyser residents are:

- Northrop Grumman, which operates Allegany Ballistics Laboratory in nearby Rocket Center, West Virginia, producing rocket motors, warheads, and fuses for the military, with more than 500 employees.
- WVU Medicine Potomac Valley Hospital, with more than 200 employees.
- Wal-Mart Stores, with more than 200 employees.
- Potomac State College of West Virginia University, with more than 100 employees.
- Mineral County Board of Education, with more than 100 employees.
- Keyser Healthcare Center by CommuniCare, which operates a nursing home, with more than 100 employees.
- Automated Packaging Systems, which manufactures bag packaging systems, with more than 100 employees.
- West Virginia Department of Highways, with more than 100 employees.
- Information Manufacturing Inc., with more than 100 employees.
- Lumber and Things, which manufactures wooden pallets and skids, with more than 100 employees.

== Demographics ==
Historical population
Census	Pop.	Note	%±
1880	1,693		—
1890	2,165		27.9%
1900	2,563		18.4%
1910	3,705		44.6%
1920	6,003		62.0%
1930	6,248		4.1%
1940	6,177		−1.1%
1950	6,347		2.8%
1960	6,192		−2.4%
1970	6,586		6.4%
1980	6,569		−0.3%
1990	5,870		−10.6%
2000	5,303		−9.7%
2010	5,439		2.6%
2020	4,864		−10.6%
2021 (est.)	4,860		−0.1%
U.S. Decennial Census

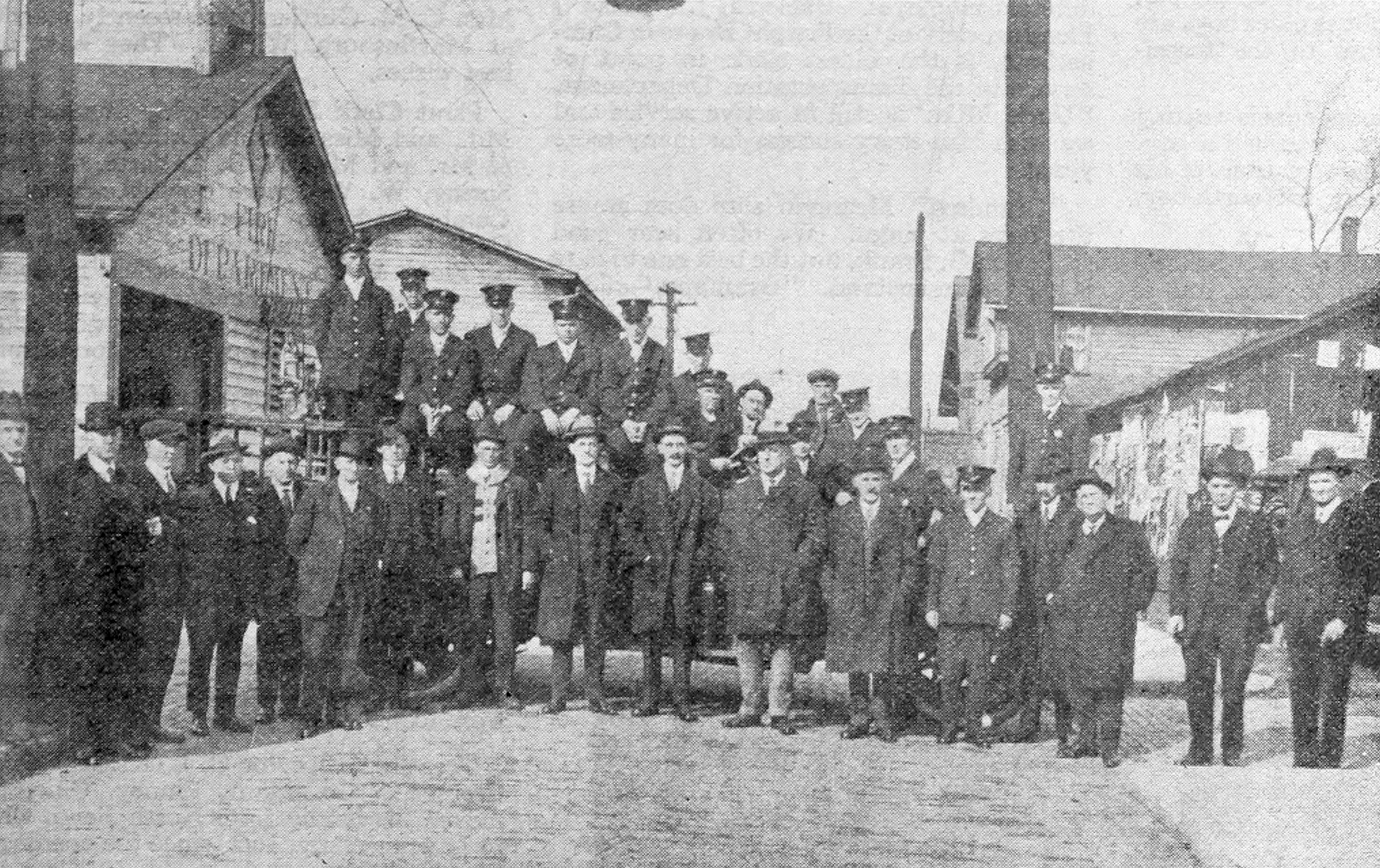
Fire Department, 1920

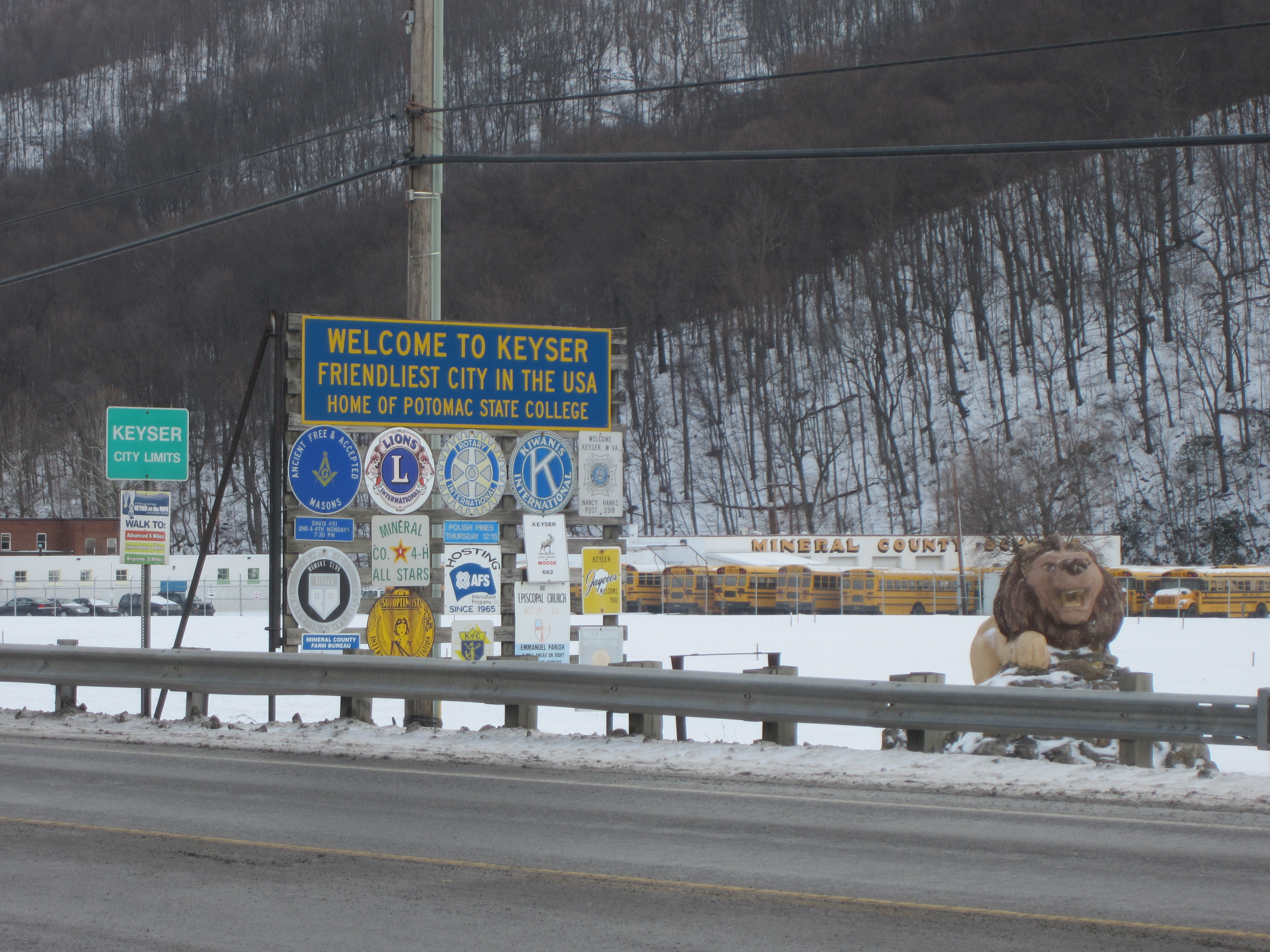
Welcome sign, "Friendliest City in the U.S.A." Taken in 2014.

=== 2020 census ===
As of the 2020 census, Keyser had a population of 4,864. The median age was 37.3 years. 20.0% of residents were under the age of 18 and 20.2% of residents were 65 years of age or older. For every 100 females there were 92.5 males, and for every 100 females age 18 and over there were 90.1 males age 18 and over.

97.8% of residents lived in urban areas, while 2.2% lived in rural areas.

There were 2,004 households in Keyser, of which 25.9% had children under the age of 18 living in them. Of all households, 32.9% were married-couple households, 22.4% were households with a male householder and no spouse or partner present, and 35.8% were households with a female householder and no spouse or partner present. About 38.5% of all households were made up of individuals and 18.5% had someone living alone who was 65 years of age or older.

There were 2,358 housing units, of which 15.0% were vacant. The homeowner vacancy rate was 2.6% and the rental vacancy rate was 11.4%.

Racial composition as of the 2020 census
Race	Number	Percent
White	4,044	83.1%
Black or African American	389	8.0%
American Indian and Alaska Native	16	0.3%
Asian	27	0.6%
Native Hawaiian and Other Pacific Islander	1	0.0%
Some other race	26	0.5%
Two or more races	361	7.4%
Hispanic or Latino (of any race)	83	1.7%

=== 2010 census ===
As of the census of 2010, there were 5,439 people, 2,224 households, and 1,253 families residing in the city. The population density was 2,832.8 inhabitants per square mile (1,093.8/km^{2}). There were 2,525 housing units at an average density of 1,315.1 units per square mile (507.8 units/km^{2}). The racial makeup of the city was 88.4 percent White, 8.6 percent African American, 0.2 percent Native American, 0.4 percent Asian, 0.1 percent from other races, and 2.3 percent from two or more races. Hispanic or Latino people made up 1.4 percent of the population.

Of the 2,224 households, 26.8 percent had children under the age of 18 living with them, 35.6 percent were married couples living together, 14.8 percent had a female householder with no husband present, 5.9 percent had a male householder with no wife present, and 43.7 percent were non-families. Of all households, 37.5 percent were made up of individuals, and 18.5 percent had someone living alone who was 65 years of age or older. The average household size was 2.20 and the average family size was 2.88.

The median age in the city was 36.1 years. 19.4 percent of residents were under the age of 18; 19 percent were between the ages of 18 and 24; 19.8 percent were from 25 to 44; 24.7 percent were from 45 to 64; and 17.1 percent were 65 years of age or older. The gender makeup of the city was 48.2 percent male and 51.8 percent female.

=== 2000 census ===
As of the census of 2000, there were 5,303 people, 2,241 households, and 1,333 families residing in the city. Population density was 2,791.7 people per square mile (1,077.9 people/km^{2}). There were 2,542 housing units at an average density of 1,338.2 units per square mile (516.7 units/km^{2}). The racial makeup of the city was 90.55 percent Euro American, 7.07 percent Black, 0.40 percent Asian, 0.32 percent from other races, and 1.43 percent from two or more races. Hispanic or Latino of any race comprised 0.72 percent of the population.

Out of 2,241 households, 24.8 percent had children under the age of 18 living with them, 42.3 percent were married couples living together, 13.3 percent had a female householder with no husband present, and 40.5 percent were non-families. 36.4 percent of all households were made up of individuals, and 18.6 percent had someone living alone who was 65 years of age or older. The average household size was 2.19 and the average family size was 2.85.

A view of Keyser from Queens Point, 2005. The worsted woolen mill - last used as a Penn Ventilator plant - is visible at bottom. The slight hill in the distance was where Fort Fuller stood and is now home to Potomac State College.

The population was spread out within the city: 20.0 percent under the age of 18, 13.5 percent from 18 to 24, 23.5 percent from 25 to 44, 22.0 percent from 45 to 64, and 21.0 percent who were 65 years of age or older. The median age was 40 years. For every 100 females, there were 89.2 males. For every 100 females age 18 and over, there were 85.2 males.

The median income for a household in the city was $23,718, and the median income for a family was $32,708. Males had a median income of $29,034 versus $20,818 for females. Per capita income was $13,813. About 16.3 percent of families and 18.9 percent of the population were below the poverty line, including 34.2 percent of those under age 18 and 11.0 percent of those age 65 or over.

== Education ==
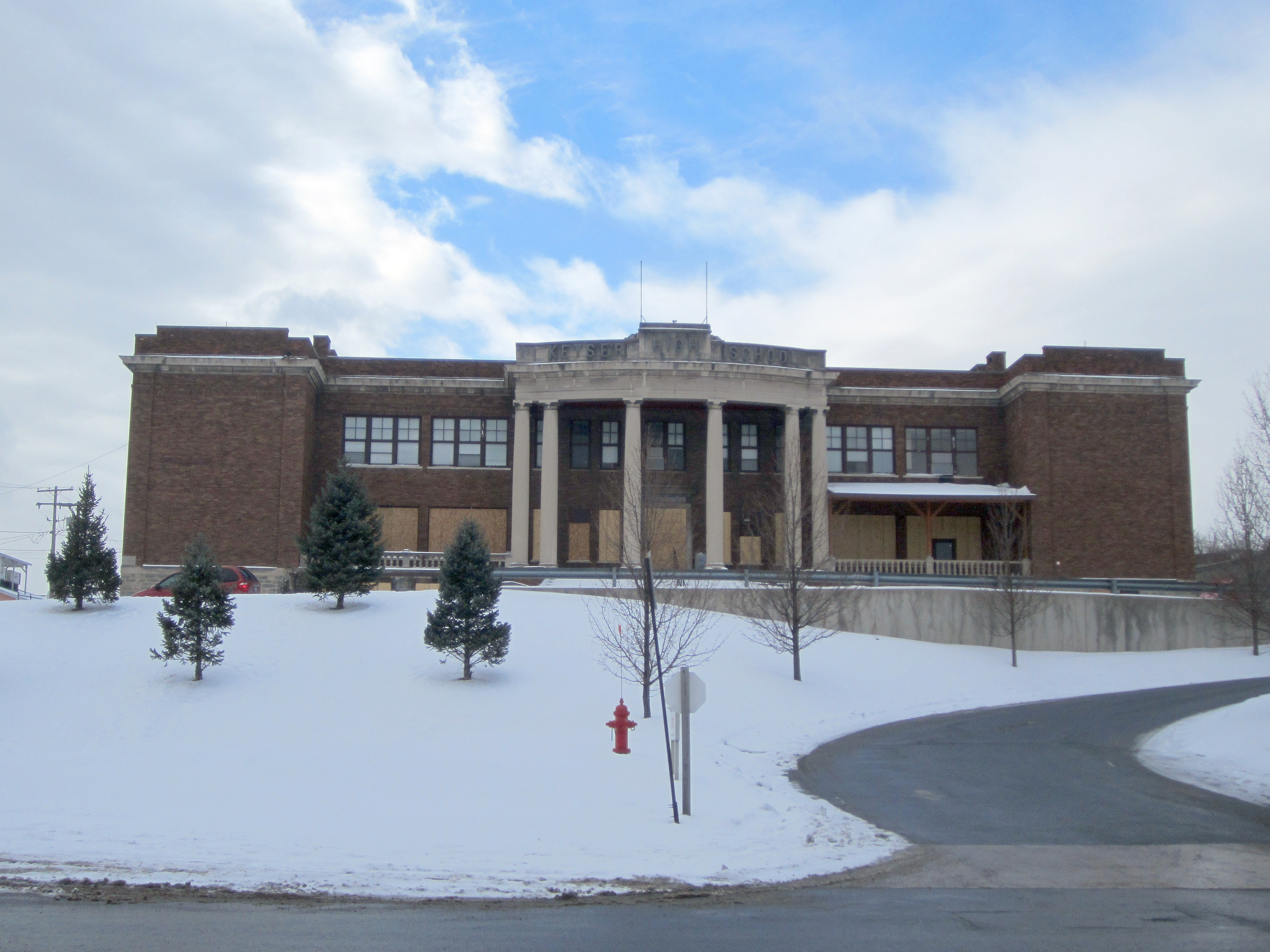
The old Keyser High School in January 2014

Keyser is the home of the Potomac State College of West Virginia University, a junior college that serves primarily as a feeder college to WVU's main campus in Morgantown.

Keyser is part of the Mineral County Schools district. The schools in Keyser include Keyser Primary School and Fountain Primary School, which cover Pre-Kindergarten through fourth grade; Keyser Middle School, which covers fifth through eighth grade; Keyser High School, which covers ninth through 12th grades; Mineral County Alternative School; and the Mineral County Technical Center, a vocational school. The mascot of Keyser High is the "Golden Tornado."

== Media ==
The city and surrounding county are served by a local newspaper, the Mineral News and Tribune.

Three radio stations broadcast in Keyser: WQZK 94.1 FM (Top 40), WKYW 102.9 FM (Folk), and WKLP 1390 AM (Sports).

== Notable people ==
- William Armstrong (1782–1865) – United States representative from Virginia. Died in Keyser.
- Woodrow Wilson Barr (1918–1942) – World War II soldier awarded the Silver Star posthumously; born in Keyser
- Ruth Ann Davis (1936–2009) – American educator and academic
- Henry Louis Gates Jr. (b. 1950) – Historian, author, academic; born in Keyser
- Jonah Edward Kelley (1923–1945) – World War II soldier awarded the Medal of Honor posthumously; raised in Keyser
- John Kruk (b. 1961) – Major League Baseball player, ESPN baseball analyst; raised in Keyser
- Pete Ladygo (1928–2014) – American/Canadian football player for the Pittsburgh Steelers and Ottawa Rough Riders
- Frank Lovece – Journalist, author, comics writer; lived there in childhood
- Catherine Marshall (1914–1983) – American author known for her inspirational works, notably the novel Christy; raised in Keyser
- Leo Mazzone (b. 1948) – Major League Baseball pitching coach; born in Keyser
- Walter E. Rollins (1906–1973), (also known as Jack Rollins) – Songwriter who wrote "Frosty the Snowman" and "Smokey Bear"
- Harley Orrin Staggers (1907–1991) – United States Congressman; born in Keyser

== In popular culture ==
Keyser is mentioned in the BBC television mini series The State Within (Season 1, Episode 1).

== Bibliography ==
- Wolfe, William W. (1974). History of Keyser, West Virginia 1737–1913. Keyser, West Virginia: Keyprint, Inc. OCLC 1056129 – via Internet Archive.
