= Frostburg, Maryland =

City in Maryland, United States

Frostburg
- City
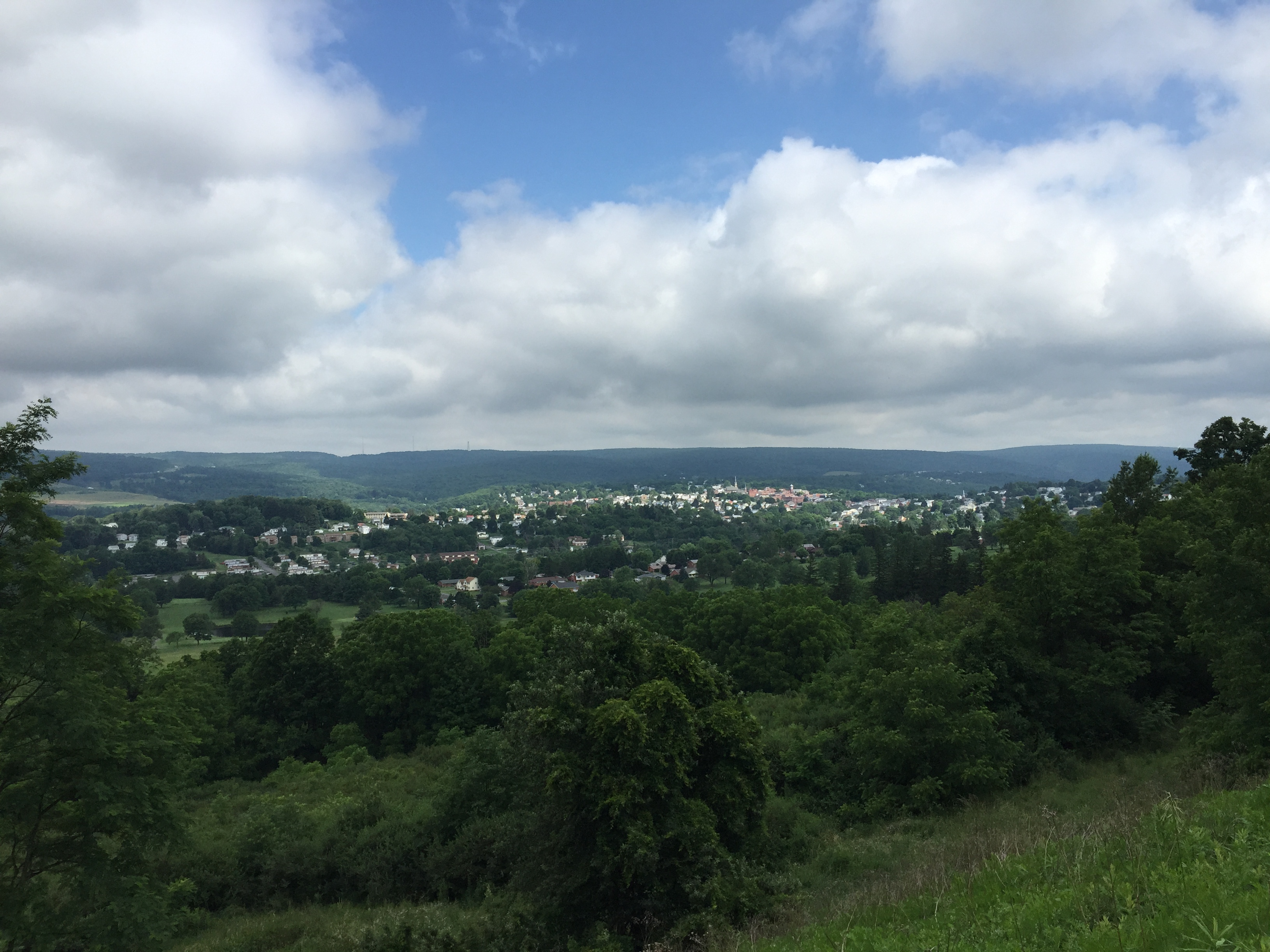
- View of Frostburg from MD Route 36 near I-68

- Flag Seal

- Location in Maryland

- Location within Maryland Location within the United States
- Coordinates: 39°39′02″N 78°55′37″W
- Country: United States
- State: Maryland
- County: Allegany
- Incorporated: 1839

Government
  - Type: City commission government

Area
  - Total: 3.35 sq mi (8.67 km^{2})
  - Land: 3.34 sq mi (8.66 km^{2})
  - Water: 0.0039 sq mi (0.01 km^{2})
- Elevation: 1,988 ft (606 m)

Population (2020)
  - Total: 7,027
  - Density: 2,101.6/sq mi (811.43/km^{2})
- Time zone: UTC−5 (Eastern)
  - Summer (DST): UTC−4 (Eastern)
- ZIP Code: 21532
- Area codes: 301, 240
- FIPS code: 24-30900
- GNIS feature ID: 2390589
- Website: www.frostburgcity.org/

Frostburg is a city in Allegany County, Maryland, United States. It is located at the head of the Georges Creek Valley, 8 miles (13 km) west of the county seat of Cumberland. The town is one of the first cities on the "National Road", US 40, and the western terminus of the Western Maryland Scenic Railroad. It is part of the Cumberland metropolitan area.

Frostburg was originally called Mount Pleasant until 1820, when the government developed a postal service. Since 1973, the city has been served by what is now Interstate 68.

As of the 2020 census, Frostburg had a population of 7,027. In addition, 5,400 students attend Frostburg State University, a public university within the University System of Maryland.

== Geography ==
According to the U.S. Census Bureau, the city has a total area of 3.42 square miles (8.86 km^{2}), all land.

Frostburg is located in the Allegheny Mountains on the eastern slope of Big Savage Mountain. The closest cities to Frostburg are Cumberland, Maryland, 8 miles (13 km) to the east, and Morgantown, West Virginia, 62 miles (100 km) to the west.

=== Climate ===
Due to its average elevation of 2,000 feet (610 m) above sea level and location near the Allegheny Front, Frostburg has a colder, wetter climate than most of Maryland, and falls in USDA hardiness zone 6b. Under the Köppen climate classification, it has a humid continental climate (Dfb), with cold, snowy winters, and warm, humid summers. The daily mean temperature ranges from 26.0 °F (−3.3 °C) in January to 69.0 °F (20.6 °C) in July. Sub-0 °F (−18 °C) occur on 3.8 nights per year, while, on average, there are 1.4 days with 90 °F (32 °C)+ highs, though these are not recorded every year. Due to orographic lift, driving conditions on Interstate 68 and U.S. Route 40 can be very hazardous despite timely state and local road maintenance services, and the town averages just over 80 inches (200 cm) of snowfall a season; significant falls can occur as early as October and as late as May. Frostburg's greatest one-month snowfall was 67 inches (170 cm) in January 1978, and Frostburg is second in Maryland for the greatest single-season snowfall with a total of 180 inches (460 cm) in the winter of 1995−96.

Climate data for Frostburg, Maryland (1991−2020 normals, extremes 1972−present)
Month	Jan	Feb	Mar	Apr	May	Jun	Jul	Aug	Sep	Oct	Nov	Dec	Year
Record high °F (°C)	66 (19)	77 (25)	84 (29)	88 (31)	89 (32)	91 (33)	96 (36)	94 (34)	91 (33)	87 (31)	83 (28)	73 (23)	96 (36)
Mean daily maximum °F (°C)	33.9 (1.1)	37.2 (2.9)	46.2 (7.9)	59.4 (15.2)	68.1 (20.1)	75.3 (24.1)	79.4 (26.3)	78.1 (25.6)	71.9 (22.2)	60.3 (15.7)	48.5 (9.2)	38.0 (3.3)	58.0 (14.4)
Daily mean °F (°C)	26.2 (−3.2)	28.6 (−1.9)	36.3 (2.4)	48.1 (8.9)	57.4 (14.1)	65.3 (18.5)	69.4 (20.8)	68.1 (20.1)	61.8 (16.6)	50.6 (10.3)	40.0 (4.4)	30.9 (−0.6)	48.6 (9.2)
Mean daily minimum °F (°C)	18.5 (−7.5)	19.9 (−6.7)	26.4 (−3.1)	36.8 (2.7)	46.8 (8.2)	55.3 (12.9)	59.4 (15.2)	58.1 (14.5)	51.7 (10.9)	40.9 (4.9)	31.4 (−0.3)	23.9 (−4.5)	39.1 (3.9)
Record low °F (°C)	−26 (−32)	−10 (−23)	−7 (−22)	7 (−14)	23 (−5)	34 (1)	37 (3)	36 (2)	28 (−2)	18 (−8)	4 (−16)	−16 (−27)	−26 (−32)
Average precipitation inches (mm)	3.36 (85)	3.03 (77)	3.97 (101)	4.00 (102)	5.18 (132)	4.61 (117)	3.70 (94)	3.55 (90)	4.21 (107)	3.25 (83)	2.92 (74)	3.43 (87)	45.21 (1,148)
Average snowfall inches (cm)	19.0 (48)	19.0 (48)	14.9 (38)	1.8 (4.6)	0.0 (0.0)	0.0 (0.0)	0.0 (0.0)	0.0 (0.0)	0.0 (0.0)	0.4 (1.0)	4.0 (10)	13.0 (33)	72.1 (183)
Average precipitation days (≥ 0.01 in)	15.2	12.7	13.4	13.9	15.5	13.8	11.5	11.2	10.9	11.3	10.5	13.0	152.9
Average snowy days (≥ 0.1 in)	11.6	9.6	7.2	1.7	0.0	0.0	0.0	0.0	0.0	0.4	2.5	7.8	40.8
Source: NOAA

== History ==
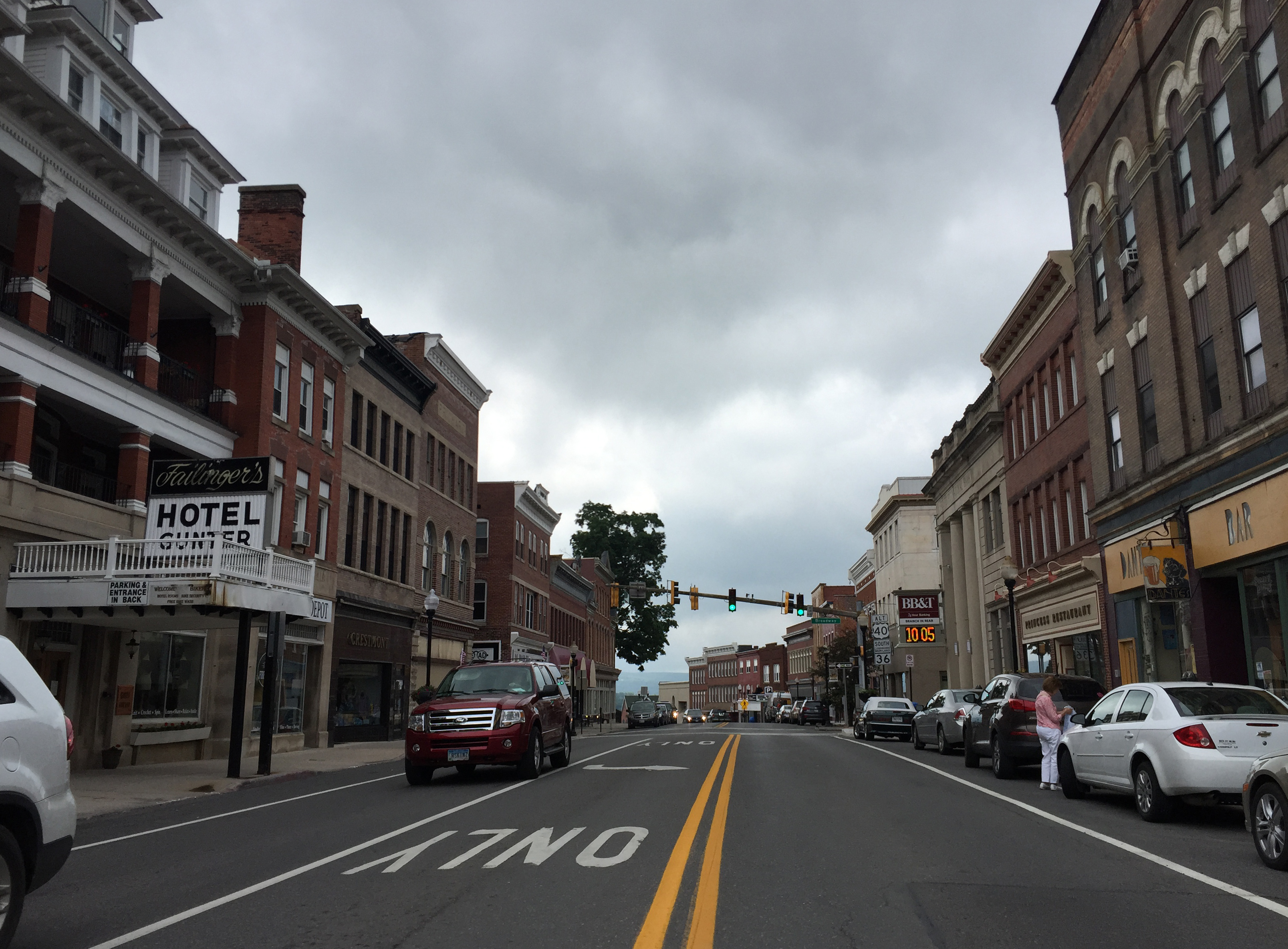
Main Street in Frostburg

Frostburg had its beginnings in 1811 when surveying began for the National Road, a highway which ran west from nearby Cumberland, Maryland. President Thomas Jefferson had authorized construction of the road in 1806. Meshach Frost built the first house in present-day Frostburg in 1812 and named it Highland Hall (on the present-day the site of St. Michael's Church and Rectory). This building was a popular stopping point for celebrities and dignitaries who traveled the National Pike. This would be followed by the Franklin Hotel and other hotels.

The Baltimore and Ohio Railroad (B&O) and the Chesapeake and Ohio Canal reached Cumberland in 1842 and 1850, respectively. Consequently, travel on the National Pike saw a steady decline, although travel through Frostburg did not. Coal mining was the first major economic draw, but the industry faced problems in its early manifestation. The mountains of western Maryland and Frostburg proved to make transportation of coal very difficult. Not until the completion of the railroads did the coal industry in Frostburg began to flourish. The first major coal producer was Meshech Frost, who owned a significant amount of land for mining and founded the Frostburg Coal Company. This eventually was sold to the much larger Consolidated Coal Company.

Structures from the coal industry's dominant period still remain. One of the major freight depots for coal is located at 19 Depot St. in Frostburg and is one of the few remaining depots in western Maryland. The Mount Savage Railroad was the first to build a rail line to Frostburg in 1852, and it connected to the B&O Railroad in Cumberland, as well as the C&O Canal. The Cumberland and Pennsylvania Railroad (C&P) took over the Mount Savage line in 1854, and expanded with the construction of a tunnel under Frostburg, and a rail line southward to Piedmont, West Virginia. This railroad and tunnel were used to transport coal between Frostburg and George's Creek. Another major economic turn for Frostburg was the manufacture of fire brick beginning in 1864, utilizing the high-grade fire clays which are found in the area. One of the main businesses that formed was the Big Savage Fire Brick Company, still one of the main suppliers of fire bricks on the East Coast.

In 1898, the Maryland General Assembly authorized State Normal School #2 and a $20,000 appropriation to construct a building, though no money to buy land. The money for the land was collected among local citizens, many of them coal miners and their families. Two years later the first building, Old Main, opened. Two years after that, the first classes were held. The only available course of study at that point was a two-year elementary-education program. In 1904, the first class graduated.

In 1934, State Normal School #2 introduced its first four-year program. Nearly 30 years later (1963), the school was renamed Frostburg State College. In the next ten years more programs sprouted, including the university's first graduate program. In 1987, Frostburg State College joined the University System of Maryland and was renamed Frostburg State University. FSU celebrated its centennial in 1998.

=== National Register Sites ===
The Hocking House was listed on the National Register of Historic Places in 1982. The Frostburg Historic District was listed in 1983 and the Borden Mines Superintendent's House in 1984.

=== 1998 Tornado ===
On June 2, 1998, an F4 tornado struck Frostburg and the adjacent Eckhart Mines valley, damaging more than 125 homes and Frost Elementary School.

== Schools and universities ==
- Beall Elementary School, Grades K–5
- Eckhart Alternative School, Grades 6–12
- Frost Elementary School, Grades K–5
- Mount Savage School, Grades K–8, in Mount Savage, Maryland
- Mountain Ridge High School, Grades 9–12
- St. Michael School, Grades K–5 (closed, 2009 or 2012)
- Frostburg State University

== Demographics ==
Historical population
Census	Pop.	Note	%±
1890	3,804		—
1900	5,274		38.6%
1910	6,028		14.3%
1920	6,017		−0.2%
1930	5,588		−7.1%
1940	7,659		37.1%
1950	6,876		−10.2%
1960	6,722		−2.2%
1970	7,327		9.0%
1980	7,715		5.3%
1990	8,075		4.7%
2000	7,873		−2.5%
2010	9,002		14.3%
2020	7,027		−21.9%
U.S. Decennial Census

=== 2020 census ===
As of the 2020 census, Frostburg had a population of 7,027. The median age was 31.9 years. 16.0% of residents were under the age of 18 and 18.7% of residents were 65 years of age or older. For every 100 females there were 92.5 males, and for every 100 females age 18 and over there were 90.9 males age 18 and over.

99.5% of residents lived in urban areas, while 0.5% lived in rural areas.

There were 2,968 households in Frostburg, of which 21.5% had children under the age of 18 living in them. Of all households, 31.0% were married-couple households, 25.0% were households with a male householder and no spouse or partner present, and 36.4% were households with a female householder and no spouse or partner present. About 43.9% of all households were made up of individuals and 17.7% had someone living alone who was 65 years of age or older.

There were 3,756 housing units, of which 21.0% were vacant. The homeowner vacancy rate was 2.0% and the rental vacancy rate was 13.7%.

Racial composition as of the 2020 census
Race	Number	Percent
White	5,690	81.0%
Black or African American	699	9.9%
American Indian and Alaska Native	19	0.3%
Asian	220	3.1%
Native Hawaiian and Other Pacific Islander	4	0.1%
Some other race	91	1.3%
Two or more races	304	4.3%
Hispanic or Latino (of any race)	139	2.0%

=== Demographic estimates ===
Area population in 2023 was 8,684. In 2021, the self-identified racial and cultural profile was 72% White alone, 14% Black alone, 5% Hispanic, 4% two or more races, 3% Asian alone, and 2% other alone.

=== Income and housing ===
The median household income in 2021 was $42,416. Median house or condo value in 2021 was $153,419. Mean detached house price in 2021 was $196,999, and mean townhouse/attached unit price in 2021 was $188,876. The cost of living index in 2023 was 84.3.

=== Public safety ===
Full-time law enforcement employees in 2020, including police officers, numbered 17. The crime index was 46% of the U.S. average.

== Transportation ==
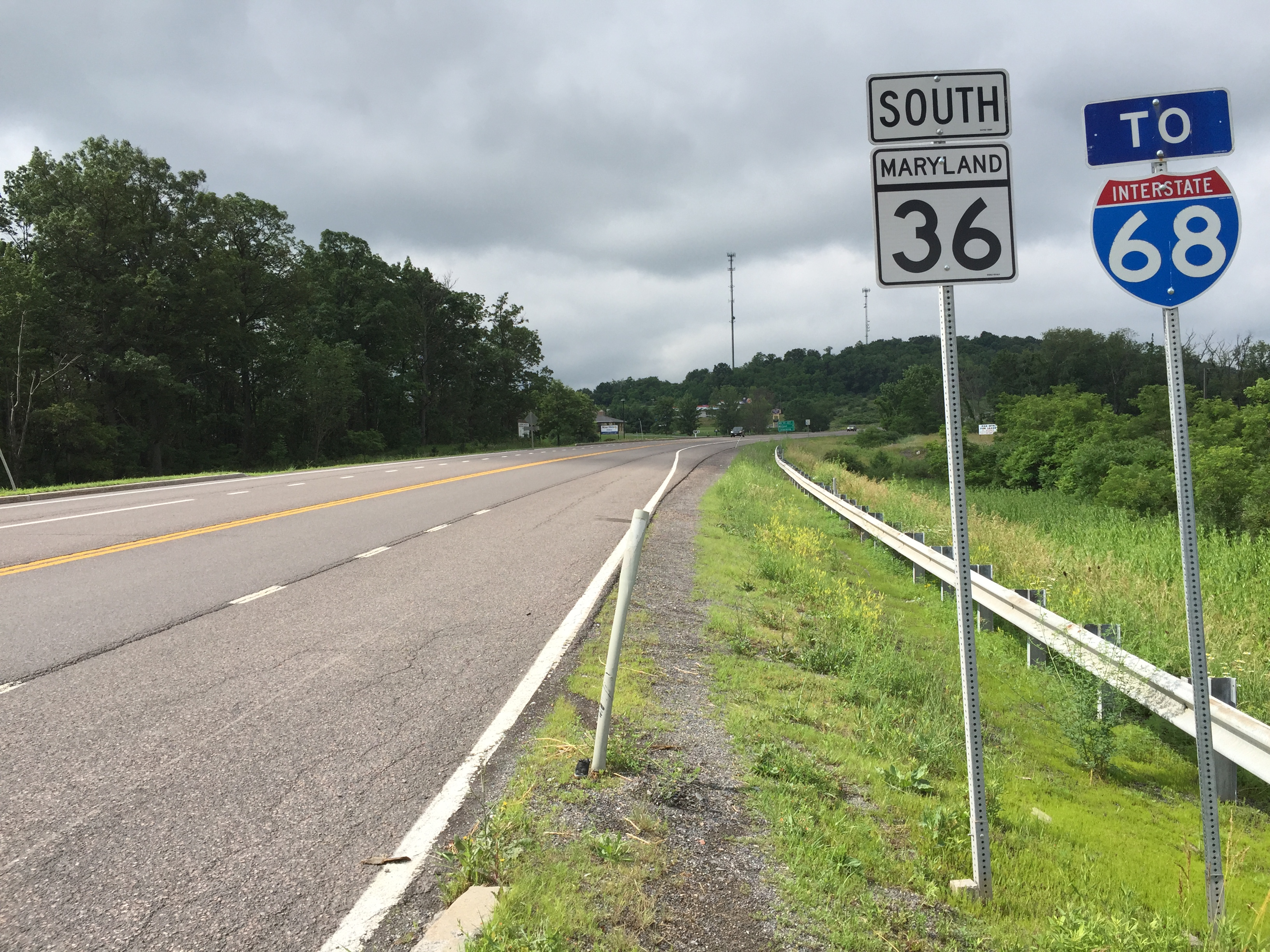
MD Route 36 South in Frostburg

The main transportation means to and from Frostburg are by road. The main highway directly serving Frostburg is U.S. Route 40 Alternate, which follows Main Street through downtown. Interstate 68/U.S. Route 40 is the main highway serving the region around Frostburg, which is accessible from Frostburg proper via Maryland Route 36 and Maryland Route 736.

== Local art and culture ==
Arion Band is a community band based in Frostburg. Established in 1877, the band has now been performing for 148 years. The band gives five to ten performances in the Frostburg and Cumberland areas during the summer. During prohibition, the Arion band helped the speakeasy in the basement of the Hotel Gunter sneak in booze. While the band would play music on the balcony, liquor was smuggled into the back.

=== Frostburg Museum and The Museum Gallery ===
Located at the corner of Hill and Oak Streets, the building in which the museum is housed was built in 1899 and was formerly the Hill Street School. The museum was established in 1976 and, with more than 8,000 square feet (740 m^{2}) of exhibit space, offers exhibits and artifacts from Frostburg and the surrounding area including the Arion Band, coal mining, genealogy, and the National Road. The Museum Gallery features a different artist's work every month.

=== Mountain City Traditional Arts ===
Located at 25 East Main St., Mountain City Traditional Arts is dedicated to the education, sales, and documentation of regional Appalachian art. There is a constant display of local art of various mediums, some of which is available for purchase. Frequently offered are live performances, literary readings, and music. They also offer classes such as knitting, card-making and holiday music.

=== Frostburg Arts and Entertainment District ===
In July 2009, a portion of downtown Frostburg that includes the Frostburg Museum and Frostburg State University was officially designated as the 18th Arts & Entertainment District of the state of Maryland, in recognition of the neighborhood's rich artistic history, its contemporary arts scene and its promise for the future. The district is administered by the Allegany Arts Council, which also administers the award-winning downtown Arts & Entertainment District in nearby Cumberland. Maryland is the first state to create art districts to help stimulate the economy.

=== Frostburg Art Walk ===
In the spring of each year, Frostburg sponsors an art walk through the arts and entertainment district. Visitors are invited for a self-guided tour through the district. Local businesses open their doors with special exhibits and demonstrations.

=== Performing Arts Center ===
Located on the Frostburg State University campus, the Performing Arts Center (PAC) has regular programs held in one of their three theaters: Pealer Recital Hall, Drama Theater and the Studio Theater. The building also has rehearsal spaces, music practice rooms and electronic labs, shops, offices, classrooms and facilities for the hearing impaired. Performances and the Cultural Events Series are open to students, faculty, and the general public.

=== Roper Gallery ===
Located in the Fine Arts building on Frostburg State University's campus, the Roper gallery hosts fine art exhibits from both senior year art students and traveling exhibits.

=== Planetarium ===
The Frostburg State University planetarium is located in GIRA CCIT. The planetarium offers a different show every month, which are shown on Sundays at 4PM and 7PM.

=== Appalachian Festival ===
The Appalachian Festival occurs every year on the third weekend in September on Frostburg State University's upper quad. The festival highlights music, food, and crafts of the Appalachian region. Artisans from the area come and sell their wares in areas of woodworking, quilts, and glasswork. There are children's activities offered and educational opportunities. There are often live animals in a petting zoo format. There are tents that offer instruction in folk skills such as dancing, soap making, and basket making.

=== The Western Maryland Scenic Railroad ===
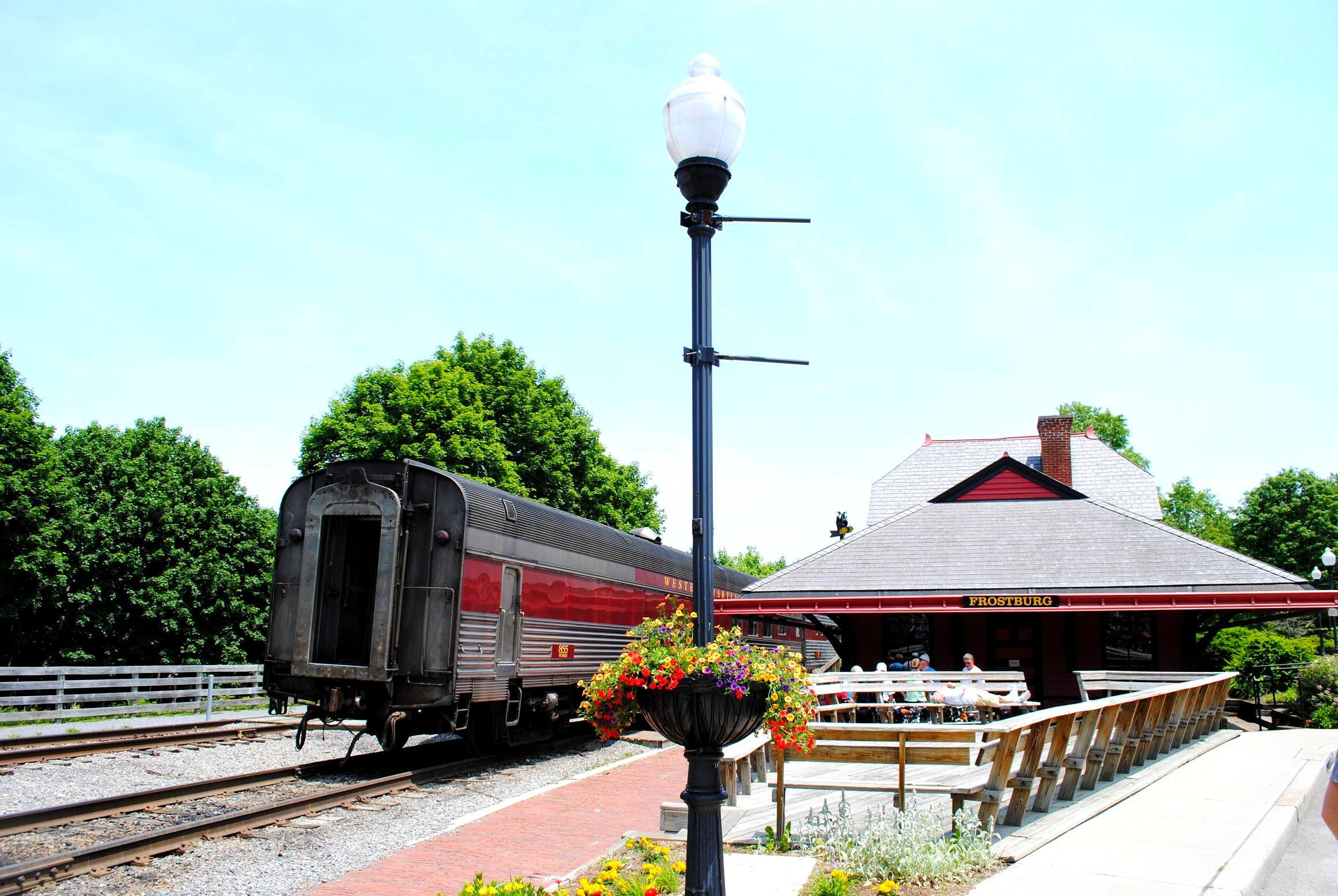
A Western Maryland Scenic Railroad train at Frostburg station in 2011

The Western Maryland Scenic Railroad runs between Cumberland at Canal Place and Frostburg. The depot at Frostburg was originally designed for the Cumberland and Pennsylvania Railroad by architect Ephraim Francis Baldwin and built in 1891. The train stops at the Frostburg Depot for ninety minutes so passengers may shop or eat lunch. Occasionally a locomotive is detached, rotated on the turntable and run around and reattached to the other end of the train (Note: This does not apply to No. 1309, which cannot be turned, and instead a second locomotive on the rear has to tow the train back to Cumberland.) for its journey back to Cumberland. These maneuvers takes about fifteen minutes and attract a lot of attention from the passengers, most of whom are tourists. Surrounding the depot are Linns Bar and Grill, The Trail Inn and Cafe, The Great Allegheny Passage Hiking/Biking Trail, and the Thrasher Carriage Museum. The standard train ride departs at 11:30 a.m. from the Cumberland station and lasts approximately 3.5 hours. The railroad also offers a variety of specialty trains such as a Murder Mystery train, a Christmas themed train, an Easter train, and a pumpkin patch train.

=== Thrasher Carriage Museum ===
The museum gives visitors the chance to take a look back in time to the nineteenth century to see how the people in that century were transported. There are examples of the different types of vehicles there. For example, there are funeral wagons, carts, pleasure vehicles, carts a milkman would have used and a lot more. There are docents who dress up in the Victorian American clothing from that time. It gives the visitors the feeling that they are going back in time. This museum really gives visitors a chance to look into the life of a person from the 19th century. The Thrasher Carriage Museum was named after James Richard Thrasher. He lived in Midland, Maryland and was born in 1913. Mr. Thrasher developed a love of horses at a very early age which led him into collecting carriages and participating in various parades just to show off his collection. He died in 1987.

=== Historic Downtown Frostburg ===
Historical Downtown Frostburg was constructed between the years of 1870–1915 when the town was entrenched in the mining and brick making industry.

The Princess Restaurant, located on Main St., has been in business since 1939. President Harry S. Truman visited the restaurant shortly after he left office; a framed sign hangs above the booth in which he sat.

The Hotel Gunter, located on Main St across the street from the Princess Restaurant, opened in 1897. Originally named Hotel Gladstone, the original hotel had 100 rooms, a cafe, a barbershop, and a sample room for displaying traveling salesmen's wares. The hotel tanked and was sold in 1903 to William Gunter, who renamed it the Hotel Gunter in 1925. He installed a jail for prisoners being transferred and a cock-fighting ring in the basement. The hotel's basement was also used as a speakeasy during prohibition.

=== Municipal activities ===
The Frostburg Community Swimming Pool is located at 200 South Water St.

The Frostburg Public Rifle Range is located at Clifton Terrace just off Rt. 40. The range has four 100 yard firing lanes, one 200 yard firing lane, and a 6 lane 25 meter pistol range.

The Frostburg Dog Park is a large open space with separate fenced sections for large and small dogs to let dogs socialize with each other, play, and roam off-leash.

Parks

- Parris N. Glendening Recreation Complex, named for former Governor of Maryland Parris Glendening, is located at Shaw St. and Rynex Ave. The park offers 7 athletic fields, two basketball courts, two pavilions, a playground, two fishing ponds, and a half-mile walking trail.
- Frostburg Community Park is located on South Water St. The park has two baseball fields, two pavilions, a basketball court, a playground, and a pool.
- Mount Pleasant Street Park is located on Maryland Ave. and Mt. Pleasant St. The park has a basketball court, a playground, and a small baseball field.
- East End Park is located at Cemetery Road and McCulloh St. The park offers a playground and an indoor pavilion with a kitchen area.
- West End Park is located on Mechanic St. and Wenck's Lane. The park has a large pavilion and a field.
- Calhoun Park, on Willow Lane, is home to the Frostburg Dog Park.

=== Center for Creative Writing ===
Located on Main Street, the Center for Creative Writing aims to bring creative writers to Frostburg and to expand the writing ability and exposure to literature of the residents and students of Frostburg. They host a variety of events open to the public. There are also workshops that can be attended for a small fee. They sponsor the 3 AM Society, an organization of student writers.

=== Films about Frostburg ===
As part of the 2012 Bicentennial Celebrations, the City of Frostburg commissioned a documentary production titled A Day in the Life of Frostburg. Directed and edited by Frostburg resident and filmmaker, Michael Snyder, the film was shot by a group of 37 "citizen filmmakers" (residents of the city) working independently and together; a unique approach to filmmaking that lets people tell the story of life in their town from the inside out. Over 2,200 clips (nearly 30 hrs of video) were shot during a two-week filming period and then edited together in three weeks to make a 30-minute documentary.

== Media and information ==
=== Radio stations ===
- 560 AM/105.3/98.5 WFRB FM Country, local talk, offers online streaming
- 1270 AM WCBC – News/Talk information, locally owned and operated with online streaming
- 91.9/96.3 WFWM FM 24hr informational/educational/cultural radio station
- 100.9 Today's and yesterday's favorites
- 97.1 WLIC FM religious radio, talks on separation of religion and state, offer online streaming
- 94.1 QZK FM top 40 hits
- 107.1 WCBC FM Oldies station; Total Hits Radio
- 106.1 GO FM Classic Rock and new Rock
- 99.5 WDZN-FM (Z-100) modern rock and alternative
- 100.5 WDYK-FM (Magic 100.5) Adult Contemporary

=== Libraries ===
The Ort Library, located on Frostburg State University's campus, was opened in 1975. The library offers an online catalog of all books and articles in the Maryland state school system. Those materials can be transferred to Frostburg for students and staff. Their website also houses Research Port, a database of databases of articles from journals, magazines, and print. The library also offers special collections, archives, subject guides, government document research guide, and genealogy resources. There are a large number of computers available for use.

The Frostburg Library, located at 65 E Main St, offers members of the community 10,000 square feet (930 m^{2}) of books, a children's area, and new technology. They offer services such as children's, teen, and adult book sections, magazines, music, and more. There are computers in the facility, and there is a meeting room in the library that can be rented.

== City officials ==
- Mayor: Todd J. Logsdon
- City Administrator: Patrick O'Brien
- Chief of Police: Nicholas J. Costello
- Fire Chief: William "Buzz" Davis

== Notable landmarks ==
- God's Ark of Safety, a roadside landmark, is a skeletal steel structure representing the biblical Noah's Ark being built on the I-68 highway hillside since 1976.
- The Frostburg Palace Theatre is located on 31 East Main Street. In 1912 the building was purchased by the Spates brothers and remodeled. In 1913 The Palace Theater opened with a capacity of over one thousand. In 1981 the Spates shut down the theater, unable to compete with larger mall theaters. From 1984 -1987 the community raised money to purchase the building and the non-profit run by volunteers is incorporated as The Frostburg Palace Theatre. After the theater is renovated, RC Theatres leases the building from 1998 to 2000. In 2002 the mortgage is paid of and another round of renovations begin. Regular film screenings return in March 2003. From 2023 to 2026 the community raises money to install a new roof and upgrade the technical systems. The Palace shows foreign, classic, and independent films.
- The Great Allegheny Passage is a 150-mile (240 km) system of biking and hiking trails for the public that connects Cumberland, MD to Pittsburgh, PA.
- Frostburg State University was founded in 1898. Beginning as a university for teachers, Frostburg became a liberal arts school in 1960. Today, Frostburg State University has 4,755 undergraduate students, 630 graduates, and an 18:1 student faculty ratio.
- The historic Hotel Gunter first opened on New Years Day in 1897, with a barber shop, petting zoo, and jail inside. US Marshals would often stay at the hotel when transporting prisoners down Route 40 to Washington DC, and the jail was built to hold said prisoners. The hotel opened a speakeasy and cockfighting ring during prohibition. As of 2023, the building has a restaurant, apartments, and 12 hotel rooms.

== Notable people ==
- Brad Barkley, novelist and short-story writer
- James Glenn Beall, Republican U.S. Senator, 1953–1965
- George Beall, Maryland lawyer
- Charles J. Colgan, Virginia state senator
- Andy Duncan, science fiction and fantasy writer
- Stephen Dunn, poet and winner of the Pulitzer Prize
- Jack Fisher, Major League Baseball pitcher
- John J. Hafer, Republican Maryland State Senator, 1991–2007
- Jon Jenkins, National Football League player
- Ziz LaSota, cult founder arrested near Frostburg
- Joshua Moon, the owner and operator of Kiwi Farms
- T. H. Paul, locomotive manufacturer
- Bob Robertson, Major League Baseball player
- M. Virginia Rosenbaum, surveyor and newspaper editor
- James Sprigg, Whig U.S. Congressman from Kentucky, 1841–1843

== Nearby places ==
=== Cities ===
- Cumberland
- Hagerstown
- Morgantown, West Virginia

=== Smaller communities ===
- Barton
- Callimont, Pennsylvania
- Carpendale, West Virginia
- Cresaptown
- Eckhart Mines
- Gilmore
- Klondike
- La Vale
- Lonaconing
- Midland
- Vale Summit
- Wellersburg, Pennsylvania
- Woodland
