= Cumberland micropolitan area =

Coordinates: 39°35′N 78°47′W

Cumberland Metro
- Micropolitan Statistical Area
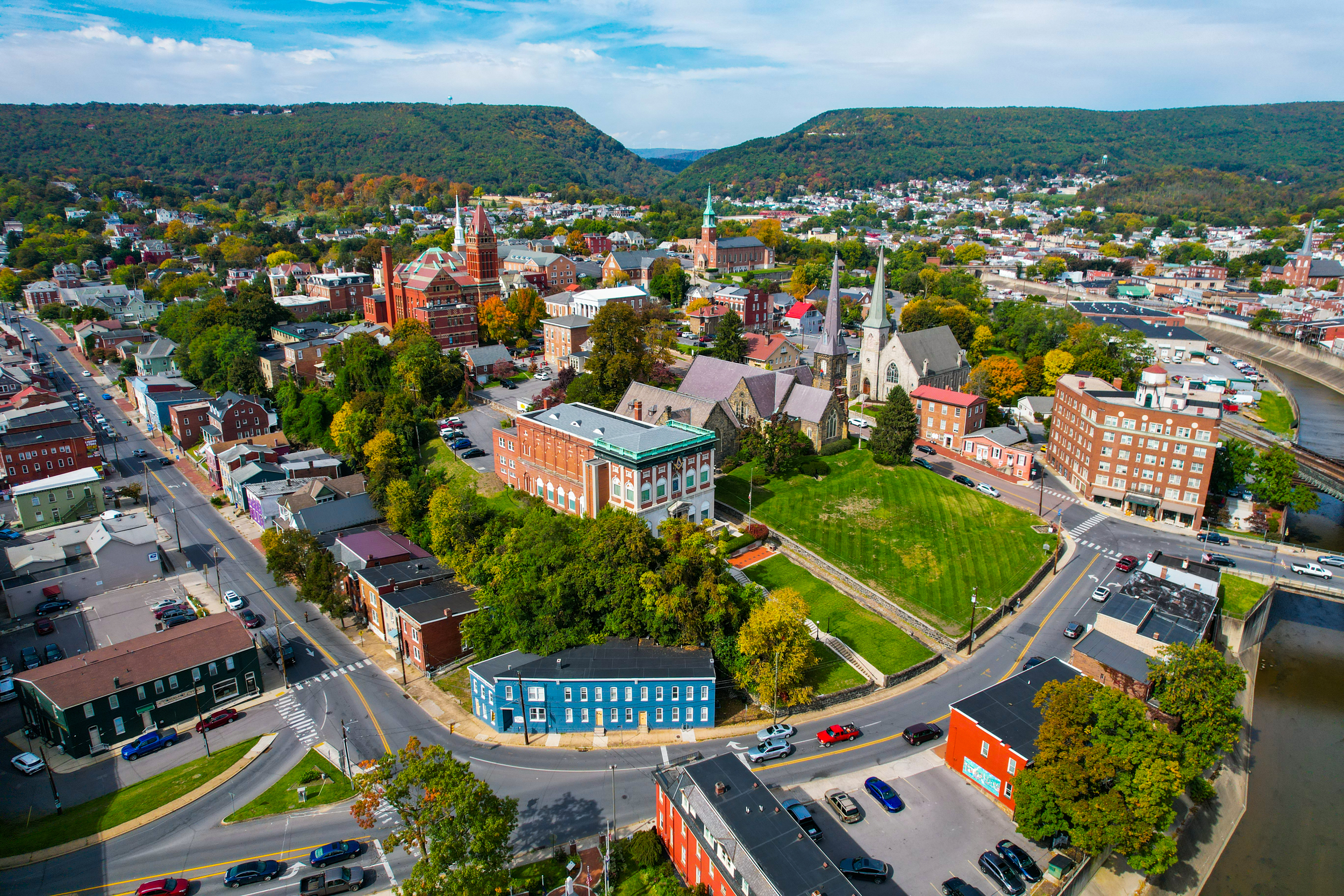
- Downtown Cumberland
Map of Cumberland, MD–WV μSA
City of Cumberland
Cumberland, MD–WV μSA
- Country: United States
- States: Maryland and West Virginia
- Principal city: Cumberland
- Other cities: Frostburg, MD; Keyser, WV; Westernport, MD
- Time zone: UTC−5 (EST)
  - Summer (DST): UTC−4 (EDT)

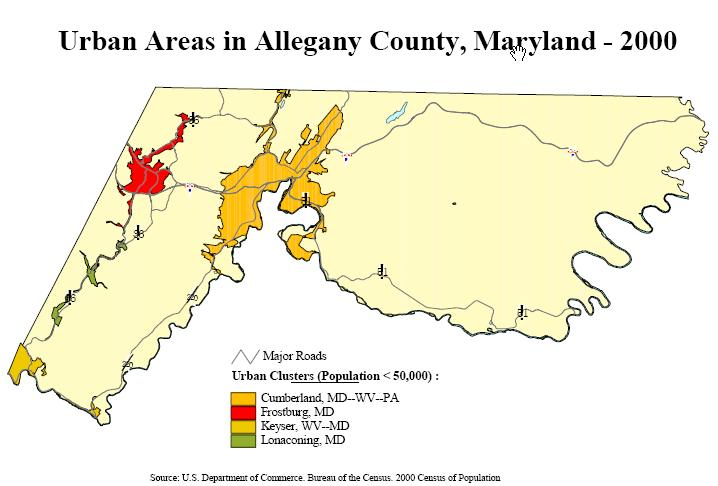
Allegany County urban areas

Cumberland, MD-WV MSA, or Cumberland Metro for short, is the micropolitan statistical area of Cumberland, Maryland, and the surrounding economic region of Allegany County, Maryland, and Mineral County, West Virginia, in the United States.

As of 2000, the City of Cumberland had a population of 21,591 and the surrounding area had a population of 102,008. Allegany and Mineral are mountainous, mostly rural areas. According to the 2000 census, more than 45 percent of the people living in the Cumberland region live in rural and non-incorporated areas.

The Cumberland Metropolitan Area is geographically isolated by a range of ridges and valleys from the rest of Maryland which is relatively flat. These mountain ranges form adjacent valleys which have served to collect and integrate the regional cities and towns together into urbanized channels that follow the valleys northeasterly. This has served to give the area a unique sense of identity and economic integration.

The median household income for the MSA was $30,916 and the average household income was $39,021. The Cumberland Metro is one of the poorest in the United States, ranking 305th out of 318 metropolitan areas in per capita income.

== GDP by year ==
Total GDP of Cumberland, MD-WV MSA

2001	1.808 billion
2002	1.920 billion
2003	1.962 billion
2004	2.023 billion
2005	2.184 billion
2011	3.466 billion
2012	3.451 billion
2013	3.455 billion
2014	3.416 billion
2015	3.443 billion
2016	3.574 billion
2017	3.613 billion
2018F	3.716 billion
2019F	3.788 billion
2020F	3.790 billion
2021F	3.840 billion
2022F	3.904 billion
2023F	3.952 billion

== Most populous places within the metro ==
- Cumberland, Maryland: 21,591
- Frostburg, Maryland: 7,529
- Cresaptown-Bel Air, Maryland: 5,900
- Keyser, West Virginia: 5,132
- La Vale, Maryland: 4,658

== Cities and towns within the metro ==
- 0.0 miles (0 km) Cumberland, MD
- 1.1 miles (1.8 km) Ridgeley, WV
- 2.9 miles (4.7 km) La Vale, MD
- 2.3 miles (3.7 km) Carpendele, WV
- 3.0 miles (4.8 km) Wiley Ford, WV
- 3.3 miles (5.3 km) Evitts Creek
- 3.5 miles (5.6 km) Bowling Green and Robert's Place
- 4.4 miles (7.1 km) Corriganville, MD
- 6.6 miles (10.6 km) Cresaptown, MD
- 6.6 miles (10.6 km) Bel Air, MD
- 6.6 miles (10.6 km) Ellerslie, MD
- 7.0 miles (11.3 km) Potomac Park, MD
- 8.1 miles (13.0 km) Spring Gap, MD
- 8.4 miles (13.5 km) Rocket Center, WV
- 8.4 miles (13.5 km) Pinto, MD
- 8.4 miles (13.5 km) Eckhart Mines, MD
- 9.5 miles (15.3 km) Mount Savage, MD
- 11.5 miles (18.5 km) Rawlings, MD
- 11.7 miles (18.8 km) Frostburg, MD
- 11.3 miles (18.2 km) Midlothian, MD
- 12.7 miles (20.4 km) Fort Ashby, WV
- 12.8 miles (20.6 km) Flintstone, MD
- 14.8 miles (23.8 km) Oldtown, MD
- 13.4 miles (21.6 km) Midland, MD
- 16.4 miles (26.4 km) Lonaconing, MD
- 19.8 miles (31.9 km) Barton, MD
- 20.4 miles (32.8 km) McCoole, MD
- 20.7 miles (33.3 km) Keyser, WV
- 24.3 miles (39.1 km) Westernport, MD
- 24.6 miles (39.6 km) Piedmont, WV
- 25.1 miles (40.4 km) Luke, MD

== Metro corridors ==
- Georges Creek Valley (Maryland Route 36)
- Interstate 68
- U.S. Route 40
- U.S. Route 220

== Regional businesses and employers ==
Significant area employers include:

- The Western Maryland Health System employs approximately 2,300 people, making it Cumberland's largest employer.
- Allegany Ballistics Laboratory/Northrop Grumman (approximately 1,000 people) a diverse state-of-the-art industrial complex located in Rocket Center, West Virginia. About 80 military products are made here. Also on the site is the Robert C. Byrd Hilltop Office Complex and the Robert C. Byrd Institute for Advanced Flexible Manufacturing.
- Allegany County government
- CSX: Located 177 miles (285 km) west of Baltimore, the Cumberland Locomotive Maintenance Facility is a vital point on CSX's Chicago to Baltimore mainline. It employs 273 people at Cumberland shops and 600 people in Cumberland.
- Allegany College of Maryland employs approximately 800 people.
- Xerox Contact Center employs about 500 people.
- The City of Cumberland employs approximately 300 people.
- CBIZ Accounting, Tax & Advisory of Maryland a full service CPA firm providing services to commercial and individual clients throughout the tri-states of Maryland, West Virginia and Pennsylvania.
- Hunter Douglas: a 378,000-square-foot (35,100 m^{2}) facility, with 300 plus employees, makes the company the largest Hunter Douglas fabrication plant in the world. However, this plant planned to close by the end of 2023.
- American Woodmark, with facilities located in the newly developed Barton Business Park, assembles wood cabinet components received from other AWC plants and ships completed cabinets to customers in the Northeast and Midwest regions of the United States. It employs approximately 500 people.
- Western Correctional Institution State Prison employs 550 people. Other people are employed at the federal prison and the new maximum-security prison, all in close proximity to Cumberland.

== See also ==
- Highest-income metropolitan statistical areas in the United States
