= Mass media in Baltimore =

Baltimore, Maryland, is a major media market, even though the city is only a 45-minute drive northeast of Washington, D.C.

The city's primary daily newspaper, The Baltimore Sun, and other Baltimore-area affiliated newspapers are property of David Smith, executive chairman of Sinclair Broadcast Group, who owns more than 200 television stations, including Fox 45. Baltimore is the 24th largest television market and 21st largest radio market in the country.

== Newspapers ==
- Baltimore Afro-American
- Baltimore Beat
- Baltimore Business Journal
- Baltimore Jewish Times
- Baltimore Out Loud
- The Baltimore Sun
- The Daily Record
- The UB Post
- The Towerlight
- The Johns Hopkins News-Letter

=== Digital newspapers ===
- The Baltimore Banner
- Baltimore Brew
- Baltimore Fishbowl
- The Real News Network
- Technical.ly Baltimore
- Wide Angle Youth Media

=== Defunct newspapers ===
- The Baltimore Banner (strike paper) (1965)
- Baltimore City Paper (1977–2017)
- The Baltimore Examiner (2006–2009)
- Baltimore Daily Commercial (1865–1867)
- The Baltimore Guide
- Baltimore Morning Herald
- Baltimore News-American
- Baltimore Wecker
- The Catholic Mirror
- Gay Life (1979–2016)
- Herald of Freedom and Torch Light
- Telegraf

== Television ==
The Baltimore television market includes the city and ten counties in northeastern Maryland. Due to Baltimore's proximity to Washington, D.C., local viewers can also receive the signal of most television stations broadcasting in the Washington television market.

The following television stations are licensed to, and broadcast from, Baltimore:

- 2 WMAR-TV Baltimore (ABC)
- 11 WBAL-TV Baltimore (NBC)
- 13 WJZ-TV Baltimore (CBS)*
- 24 WUTB Baltimore (Roar)
- 45 WBFF Baltimore (Fox)
- 54 WNUV Baltimore (The CW)
- 67 WMPB Baltimore (MPT/PBS)

The market is also served by two low-power stations: WMJF-CD (channel 39) from the Towson University campus in Towson, and WQAW-LD (channel 69) in Lake Shore.

Cable channels based in the Baltimore area include:

- Mid-Atlantic Sports Network
- Public, educational, and government access (PEG) channels
- Public-access television, channel 75
- Educational-access television, channel 76
- Government-access television (GATV), channel 25

== Radio ==
- WBAL
- WBJC
- WEAA
- WERQ
- WIYY
- WJZ
- WJZ-FM
- WLIF
- WLOY
- WNST
- WPOC
- WQSR
- WRBS
- WWIN (AM)
- WWIN-FM
- WWMX
- WYPR
- WCAO
- WCBM
- WZBA
- WZFT

== Magazines ==
- Baltimore magazine
- Baltimore SmartCEO
- Inside Lacrosse
- Grub Street (literary magazine)
- 32 Poems
- Welter
- Smartish Pace
- Where What When
- The Wine Advocate

=== Defunct magazines ===
- Baltimore Saturday Visiter
- The Portico
- The Accountant and Advertiser
- Rural Gentleman and Ladies' Companion
- The Southern Review
- Dirty Linen
- B Woman

== See also ==
- Ethnic press in Baltimore
- Media in Washington, D.C.
- Maryland media
  - List of newspapers in Maryland
  - List of radio stations in Maryland
  - List of television stations in Maryland
  - Media of locales in Maryland: College Park, Cumberland, Frederick, Gaithersburg
