= WWIN =

WWIN may refer to:

- WWIN (AM), a radio station (1400 AM) licensed to Baltimore, Maryland, United States
- WWIN-FM, a radio station (95.9 FM) licensed to Glen Burnie, Maryland, United States
- WGMU-LP, a television station (channel 39) licensed to Burlington, Vermont, United States, which was formerly branded as WWIN
- Wikipedia:What Wikipedia is not
