= PopUp Painting =

UK based social painting events company

PopUp Painting is a British events company that organises guided "sip and paint" social painting events. Founded in 2013, the company hosts events in bars, restaurants and dedicated event spaces in cities including London, Birmingham, Manchester and Leeds.

== Overview ==
PopUp Painting runs structured painting sessions in which participants create their own artwork based on a shared theme, guided by professional artists. Themes have included works inspired by artists such as Vincent van Gogh, Claude Monet and Frida Kahlo. The sessions are typically accompanied by the drinking of wine or Prosecco.

All painting materials are provided as part of the event, and participants retain their completed artworks at the end of the session. The format emphasises guided participation and informal social interaction over formal art instruction.

== History ==
PopUp Painting was established in 2013 by UK-based entrepreneurs. It was an early innovator of the paint and sip concept in the UK. Since its founding, PopUp Painting has facilitated thousands of events within the UK.

In 2021, the company opened a permanent venue, The London Art Bar, which hosts painting events and other creative workshops.

== Media coverage ==
PopUp Painting has been mentioned in UK media outlets including the BBC, Metro and the Evening Standard. Coverage has highlighted the format's accessible approach to creative experiences.
