= WCAO =

Radio station in Baltimore, Maryland

- Baltimore, Maryland; United States
- Broadcast area: Baltimore metropolitan area
- Frequency: 600 kHz (HD Radio)
- Branding: Heaven 600

Programming
- Language: English
- Format: Urban contemporary gospel

Ownership
- Owner: iHeartMedia; (iHM Licenses, LLC)
- Sister stations: WPOC; WQSR; WZFT

History
- First air date: May 8, 1922

Technical information
- Licensing authority: FCC
- Facility ID: 63777
- Class: B
- Power: 5,000 watts unlimited
- Transmitter coordinates: 39°25′47″N 76°45′41″W
- Repeater: 102.7 WQSR-HD2 (Baltimore)

Links
- Public license information: Public file; LMS
- Webcast: Listen live (via iHeartRadio)
- Website: heaven600.iheart.com

WCAO (600 kHz "Heaven 600") is a commercial AM radio station licensed to serve Baltimore, Maryland. It broadcasts an urban contemporary gospel radio format and is owned by iHeartMedia, Inc. It also airs some Christian talk and teaching programs. The station's studios and offices are located at The Rotunda shopping center in Baltimore.

WCAO is powered at 5,000 watts. To protect other stations on AM 600, it uses a four-tower array directional antenna at all times. To improve its sound quality, WCAO broadcasts using HD Radio technology. The transmitter is off Garrison Forest Road at Caves Woods Road in Owings Mills, Maryland. Programming is also heard on the HD-2 digital subchannel of co-owned 102.7 WQSR.

== History ==
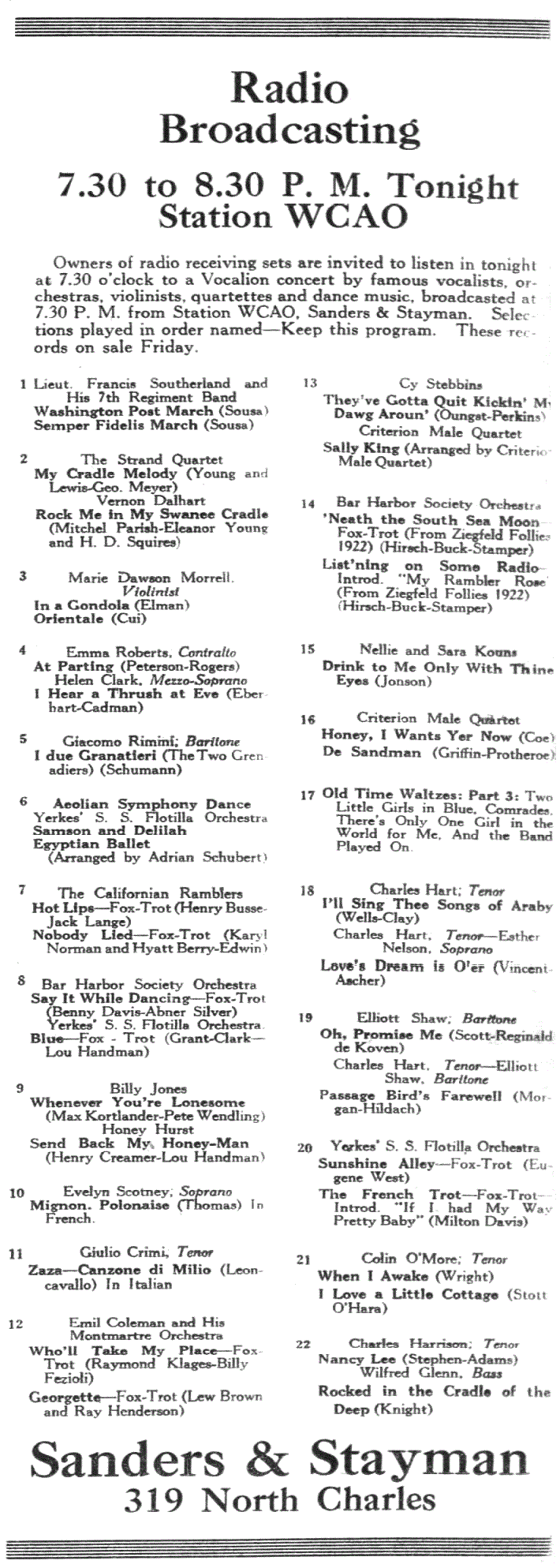
The Sanders & Stayman Company founded WCAO in 1922.

=== Early years ===
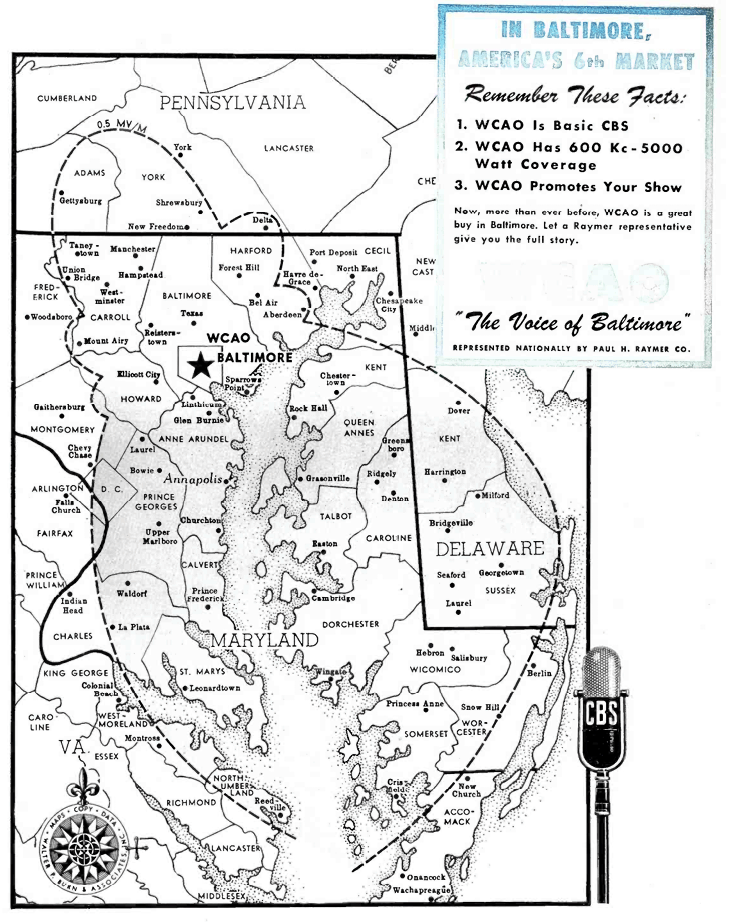
1947 station advertisement.

Effective December 1, 1921, the U.S. Department of Commerce, in charge of radio at the time, adopted a regulation formally establishing a broadcasting station category, which set aside the wavelength of 360 meters (833 kHz) for entertainment broadcasts, and 485 meters (619 kHz) for farm market and weather reports. On May 8, 1922, the Sanders & Stayman Company, which owned a variety store at 319 North Charles Street, was issued a license for a new station, initially powered at 100 watts, on the shared 360-meter "entertainment" wavelength. The station's call letters, WCAO, were randomly assigned from a sequential roster of available call signs. The station's offices, studios and transmitter were placed on the second floor, above the store. WCAO was the second broadcasting station licensed in the state of Maryland, following WKC, also in Baltimore, which had been licensed the previous March. Sanders & Stayman used WCAO to promote the sale of phonograph records and other items available at their store.

The station was reassigned to 1090 kHz in late 1924, and ownership was transferred to Albert A. and A. Stanley Brager of Brager's department store at 842 North Howard Street the next year; the station's offices, studios and transmitter were relocated to 844 North Howard Street. In 1926, Monumental Radio Incorporated, which had a radio and electronics store at 848 North Howard Street, gained ownership of WCAO but the station remained at 844 North Howard Street; the station could be heard in New York City, 170 miles (273.5 km) from Baltimore. In 1927, the station was assigned to 780 kHz, and on November 11, 1928, under the provisions of the Federal Radio Commission's General Order 40, assigned to 600 kHz, which it has been on ever since.

Power was increased from 100 watts to 250 watts in 1929 and subsequent power changes brought the station up to 5,000 watts in 1942. For much of the 1930s into 1942, WCAO was powered at 1,000 watts by day and 500 watts at night, both nondirectional, with studios in the Upton Mansion at 811 West Lanvale Street. The station had two 165-foot towers on the mansion's grounds, each with its own transmitter; one tower was used during daytime and the other at night. The increase in power to 5,000 watts in 1942 required the construction of a four-tower array (located near Park Heights Avenue in Pikesville, Maryland, adjacent to Baltimore) to direct the signal to avoid interference with other stations on or near the same frequency.

WCAO was a charter CBS Network affiliate, being one of 16 radio stations to air the first CBS Network program on September 18, 1927, and the station stayed with CBS until the late 1950s. In that era, WCAO carried CBS dramas, comedies, news, sports, soap operas, game shows, children's shows and big band broadcasts during the "Golden Age of Radio".

From May 1937 until May 1957, radio announcer Charles Purcell and theatre organist Roland Nuttrell hosted a nightly live broadcast known as "Nocturne". Nuttrell would play calming melodies on the organ at the Parkway Theatre or the Century Theatre, while many miles away in the WCAO studios located at the Upton Mansion (and later in Pikesville, Maryland), Purcell would read from his poetry book entitled The Book Of Golden Dreams. Nocturne received many positive reviews from listeners, noting it was far more effective at putting people to sleep than taking sleeping pills. The 20-year run of this program made it the longest-running radio program in Baltimore at that time.

In 1947, WCAO added an FM station, WCAO-FM (102.7 FM). At first, it mostly simulcasted the AM station, but in the 1960s through early 1977, it aired its own classical music format. Today, that station is co-owned WQSR.

=== Top 40 era ===
From the late 1950s through the 1970s, WCAO was one of Baltimore's most popular stations, broadcasting a contemporary hit radio format. WCAO disc jockeys were noted radio personalities for many young listeners such as Johnny Dark, Robert C. Allen, III, Kerby Scott, Jack Edwards, Les Alexander, Bob Bartel, Frank Luber, Donn Keller, Paul Rodgers, Alan Field, Gene Creasy, Ron Riley, Dave McKay, Bill Campbell, Lisa Kay, Dennis Murray; Lou Roberts and Alan Berrier ("Louie and the Bear" 1970s morning team).

Robert V. O. Swarthout of Monumental Radio Company operated the station until May 18, 1956, when it was purchased by Plough Broadcasting, a subsidiary of the Schering-Plough pharmaceutical company. By 1980, many contemporary music listeners had switched to FM radio to hear the latest hits.

=== Later formats ===
WCAO flipped to a country music format on October 1, 1982; however, it had trouble competing with FM counterpart WPOC (93.1 FM). The country format lasted nine years.

On November 25, 1991, WCAO switched to an urban contemporary gospel format, becoming a competitor to similarly formatted WWIN "Spirit 1400".

== Past personalities ==
Eddie Hubbard was a popular WCAO disc jockey. He later gained fame as a radio personality in Chicago.

== See also ==
- List of initial AM-band station grants in the United States
