= Dee Clemmons =

American politician

Dometrice Clemmons
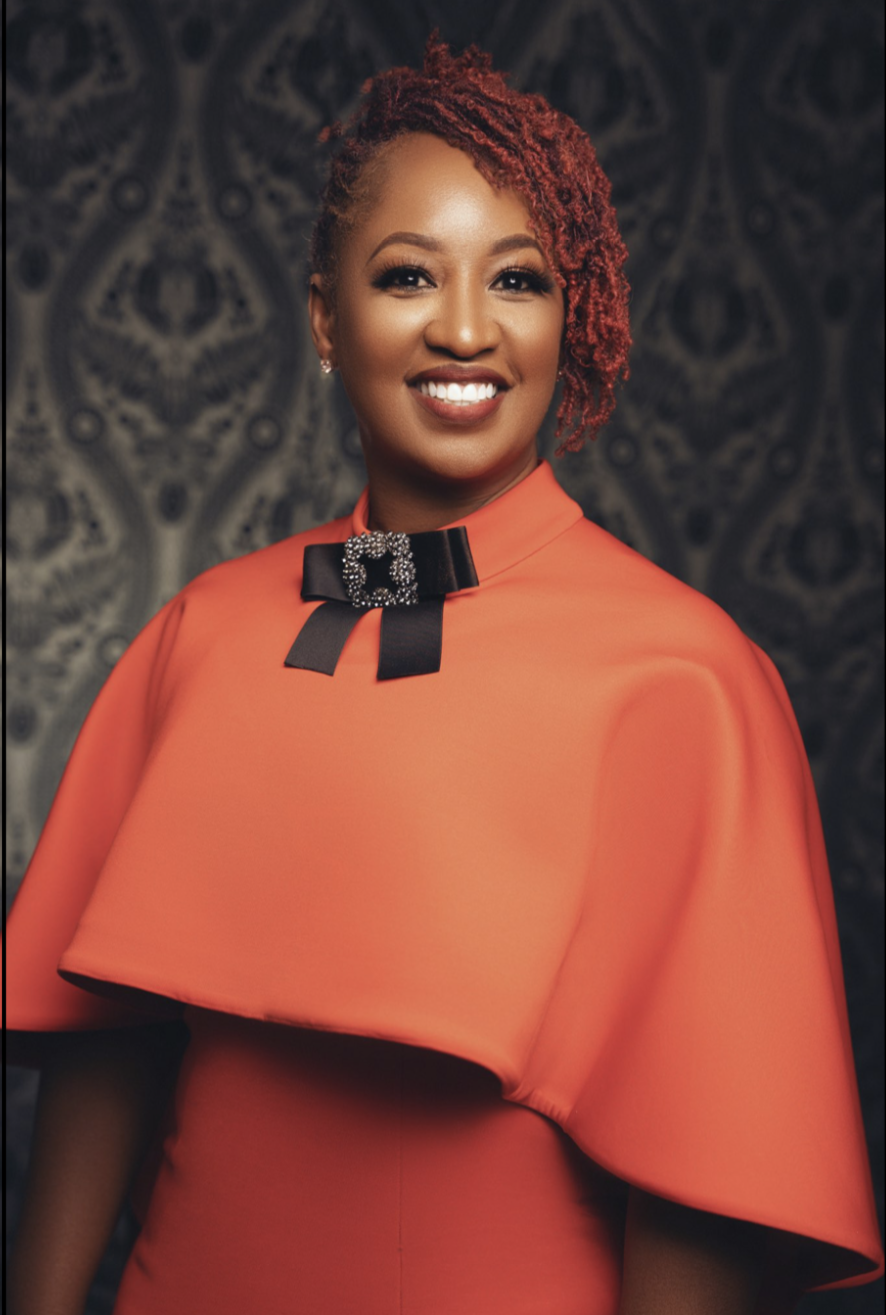
- Born: Dometrice "Dee" Clemmons; Atlanta, Georgia (state), U.S.
- Education: Spelman College
- Occupations: Businesswoman; Politician
- Known for: First African-American female Commissioner in Henry County, Georgia
- Website: www.deeclemmons.com

Dometrice "Dee" Clemmons (born in Atlanta, Georgia) is an American politician, entrepreneur, and business coach. She is the first female African-American Commissioner in Henry County, Georgia who represents the 2nd district.

== Early life and family ==
Dee was educated at Spelman College from where she graduated in 1991 with a bachelor's degree.

== Career ==
After her graduation, Dee taught middle school students until 1993, when she made the decision to change her career focus to public service. In 1990 while serving as student appointment on the First Board of the White House's Points of Light Foundation, she introduced numerous programs to develop interest in college students of public service. She continued her career as a socialpreneur

In 2016, Dee was elected to the board of commissioners in Henry County, Georgia as a Democratic Party candidate. As a commissioner, she is best known for shutting down confederate museum, named Nash Farm Battlefield Museum. Other notable works include extension of Henry County airport.

In 2018, she received Commissioner of the Year Award for her work as a commissioner to improve Highway 19/41 corridor and the county-owned Henry County Airport.

In 2020, she was named as the board chair of Shaquille Oneal Henry County Boys and Girls Club.

In 2022, she was reelected as a commissioner of Henry County.

In 2023, she stepped down as 2nd district commissioner of Henry County citing mental health issues.

As a businesswoman, she is a franchisee of Painting with a Twist which she opened during the COVID-19 pandemic. She also owns several other businesses in Florida and in Stockbridge, Georgia.

Dee is the author of books such as Influential Leadership, Empower Her, and Boss Addict.

== Bibliography ==
- Influential Leadership
- Empower Her
- Boss Addict
