= Ira Gamerman =

American dramatist

Ira Gamerman is an Australian American podcaster, playwright, professor and screenwriter. He composes music as Ira Lawrence's Haunted Mandolin on an electric mandolin he received from his estranged grandmother.

Split is about an angsty young man attempting to find himself, while interacting with imaginary friends including Vince Vaughn and an angry Alaskan, Mr Eskimo. The Baltimore Sun praised its "playful inventiveness". BroadwayWorld.com compared it to Neil Simon. The Baltimore City Paper appreciated the way Gamerman turned a "fairly inauspicious scenario" into an "achievement" that accurately represents modern patterns of thought, comparing it to sitcoms such as Scrubs.

== Works ==
=== Full-length plays ===
- Split

=== Short plays ===
- A Girl With A Black Eye
- Dated: A Cautionary Tale For Facebook Users
- "Play (by play by play by play by play by play by play by play by play by play by play. No repetition.)"
- I'll Hear It When I See It
- Actual Magic

=== One-act plays ===
- "The Best Secret Santa Present EVER In The History Of Peckinpaw High School"
- "Skyscrapers In Sheepskin"

== Press ==
Ira Gamerman's plays have received reviews from the Chicago Sun-Times, The Baltimore Sun, Time Out Chicago, City Paper, and Broadwayworld.com.

Gamerman was voted "Best Playwright" for "Split" in City Paper's 2006 Best Of Baltimore Awards and noted as one of "15 Young Baltimore Theatre Artists to Watch" by Broadwayworld.com.

Gamerman has appeared in Chicago Magazine and been interviewed by Broadwayworld.com.

His short play "Dated: A Cautionary Tale For Facebook Users" was nominated for a 2009 New York Innovative Theater Award for best short play.
