= Ethnic press in Baltimore =

The ethnic press in Baltimore, Maryland is press directed to a particular ethnic minority group or community in mind, including the non-English-language press. While English-language newspapers have always served the general population, many of Baltimore's ethnic immigrant communities have had newspapers published in their native languages.

== African-American ==
- Baltimore Afro-American, a weekly newspaper that is the flagship newspaper of the Afro-American chain and the longest-running African-American family-owned newspaper in the United States.
- Baltimore Beat is a Black-led nonprofit newspaper.

== Belarusian-American ==
- Kaskad (Cascade), a Russian-language newspaper founded by Paul Israel Pickman, a Jewish immigrant from Belarus. The newspaper is aimed at the Russian-speaking community of immigrants from Russia, Belarus, and other Russian-speaking areas. Many of the readers are Jewish immigrants from the former Soviet Union.

== Czech-American ==
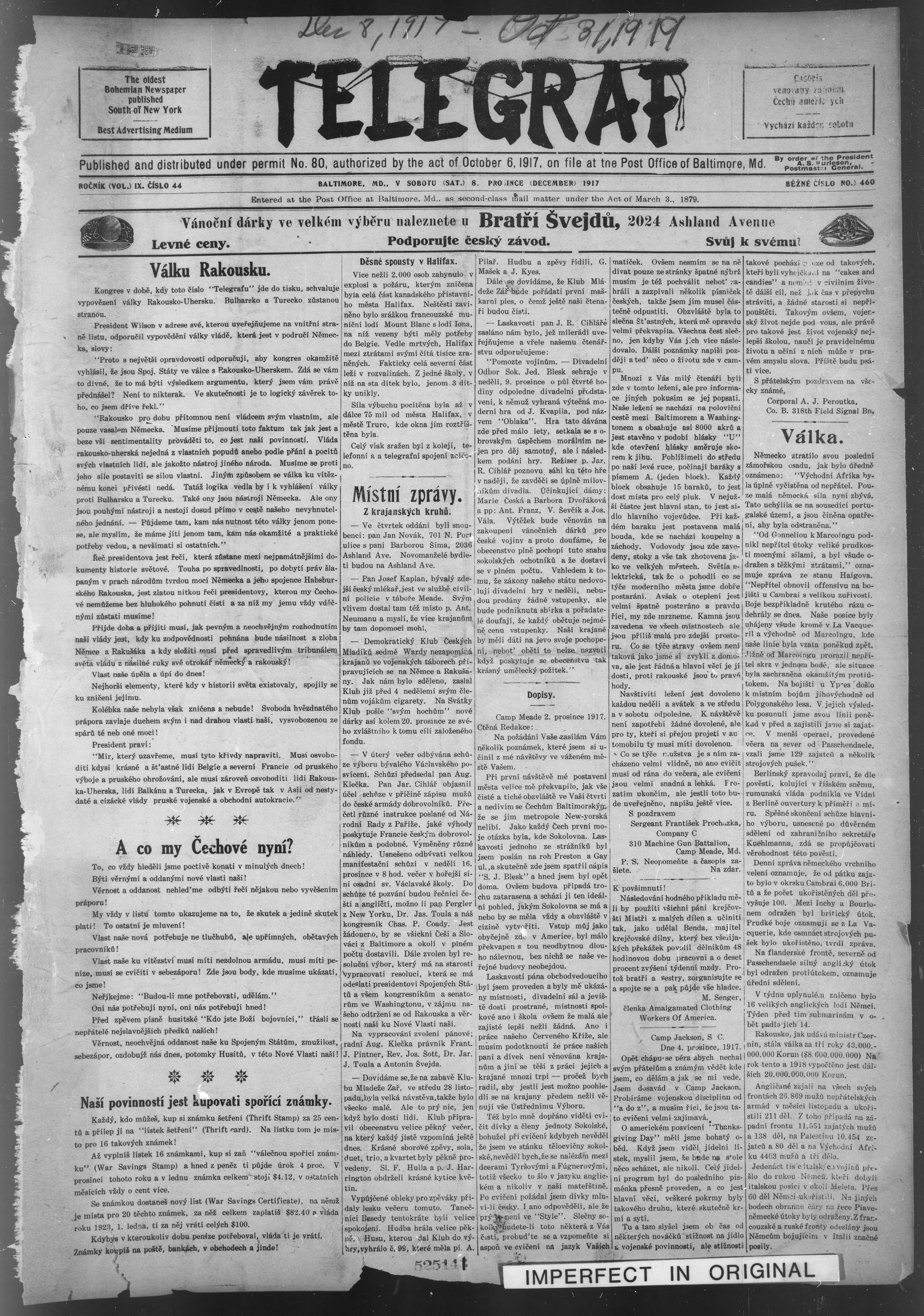
The cover page for the December 8, 1917 issue of Telegraf.

- Baltimorské Listy (Baltimore Letters), a Czech-language newspaper published in Baltimore and Chicago.
- Palecek, a Czech community newspaper from 1902.
- Telegraf, a local weekly newspaper published in Czech, running for 42 years from February 20, 1909 until 1951.

== Estonian-American ==
- Baltimore Eesti Organisatsioonide bülletään (Baltimore Estonian Organization Bulletin), an Estonian-language periodical published in Baltimore since 1965.

== German-American ==
- Der Deutsche Correspondent, a weekly German-language newspaper, 1841–1918. The paper had the greatest influence on the Germans in Baltimore, lasting longer than any of the other German newspapers in Maryland.
- Der Baltimore Wecker (The Baltimore Alarm), a daily paper published in German. It was the object of violence in the civil unrest at Baltimore in April 1861 that produced the first bloodshed of the American Civil War.
- Katholische Volkszeitung: Ein Wochenblatt im Interesse der Kirche (Catholic People's Daily: A Weekly Paper in the Interest of the Church), a German-language Roman Catholic newspaper.
- Sinai, a German-Jewish periodical devoted to the interests of radical reform.
- Sonntagsblatt des Baltimore Correspondent (Sunday Journal of the Baltimore Correspondent), a weekly German-language newspaper published on Sundays.

== Hispanic and Latino-American ==
- Latin Opinion, a bilingual, biweekly newspaper published in both Spanish and English that is marketed to the Latino community.

== Italian-American ==
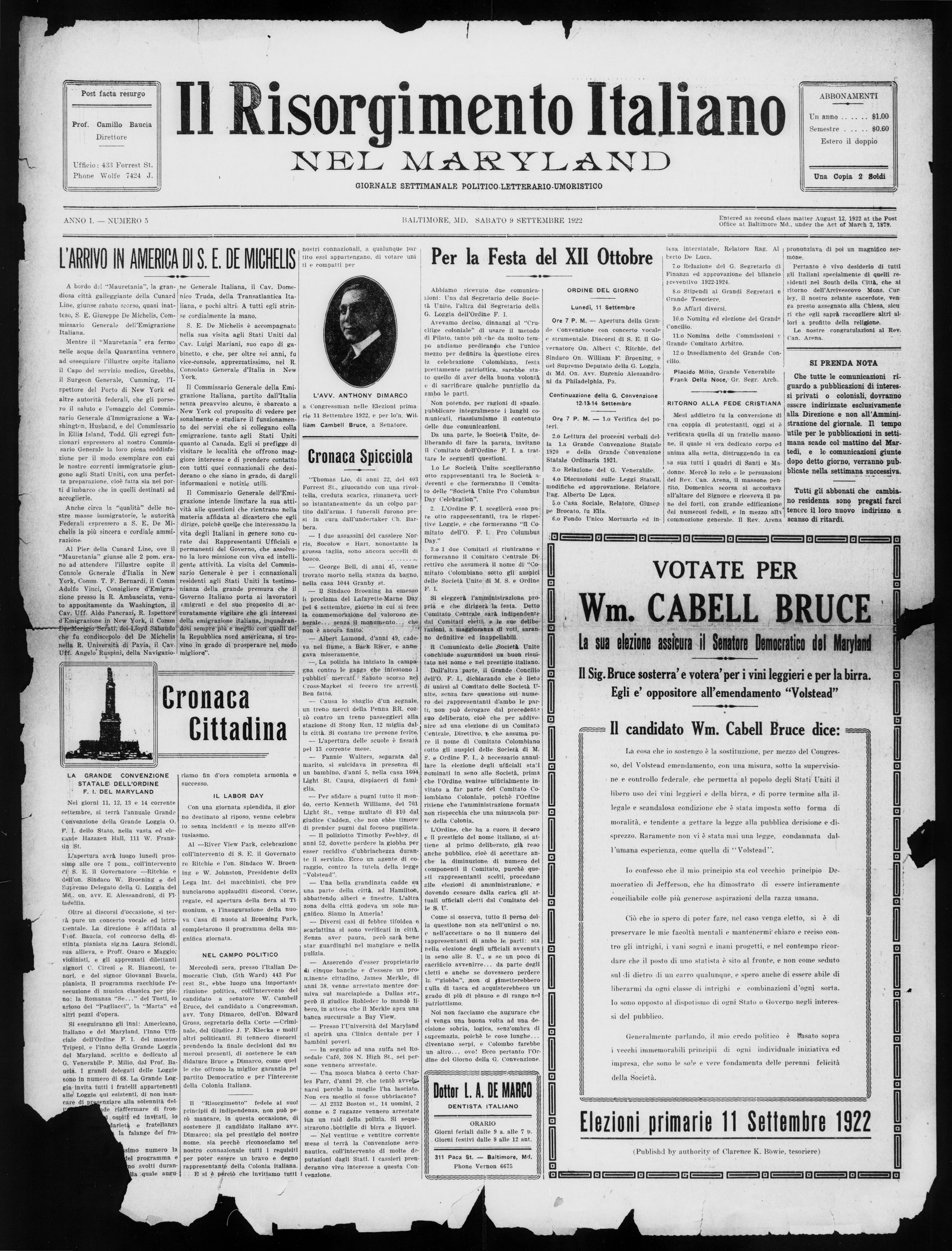
The front page for the September 9, 1922 issue of Il Risorgimento Italiano Nel Maryland.

- Il Risorgimento Italiano Nel Maryland, an Italian newspaper.
- The Italian Journal, an Italian-American newspaper published in English and Italian.

== Jewish American ==
- Baltimore Jewish Times, Baltimore's oldest and largest Jewish publication, it has been described as "the largest weekly in Maryland and one of the most respected independent Jewish publications in America", and "one of the premier independent Jewish newspapers in the country."
- Der Baltimore Israelit, a Yiddish-language newspaper published from 1891 to 1893.
- Der Fortschritt, a Yiddish-language newspaper published from June to July 1890.
- Der Wegweiser, a Yiddish-language newspaper published in 1896.
- Ha-Pisgah, a Yiddish-language newspaper published from 1891 to 1893.
- Jewish Comment, a Jewish newspaper published in 1895.
- Kaskad (Cascade), a Russian-language newspaper founded by a Jewish immigrant from Belarus. The newspaper is aimed at the Russian-speaking community of immigrants from Russia, Belarus, and other Russian-speaking areas. Many of the readers are Jewish immigrants from the former Soviet Union.
- Sinai, a German-Jewish periodical devoted to the interests of radical reform.
- The Jewish Chronicle, a Jewish newspaper published from 1875 to 1877.
- The News Exchange, a bilingual Russian-English newspaper created to facilitate the integration of Russian-Jewish immigrants into American society, established in May, 1978, by the Baltimore branch of the HIAS.
- Where What When, a monthly Jewish periodical established in 1985, its content is directed to the wide spectrum of Baltimore's Jewish population, and it has an approximate readership of 40,000.

== Lithuanian-American ==
- Pirmyn (Forward), a Lithuanian-language newspaper for the Lithuanian-American community of Baltimore.

== Polish-American ==
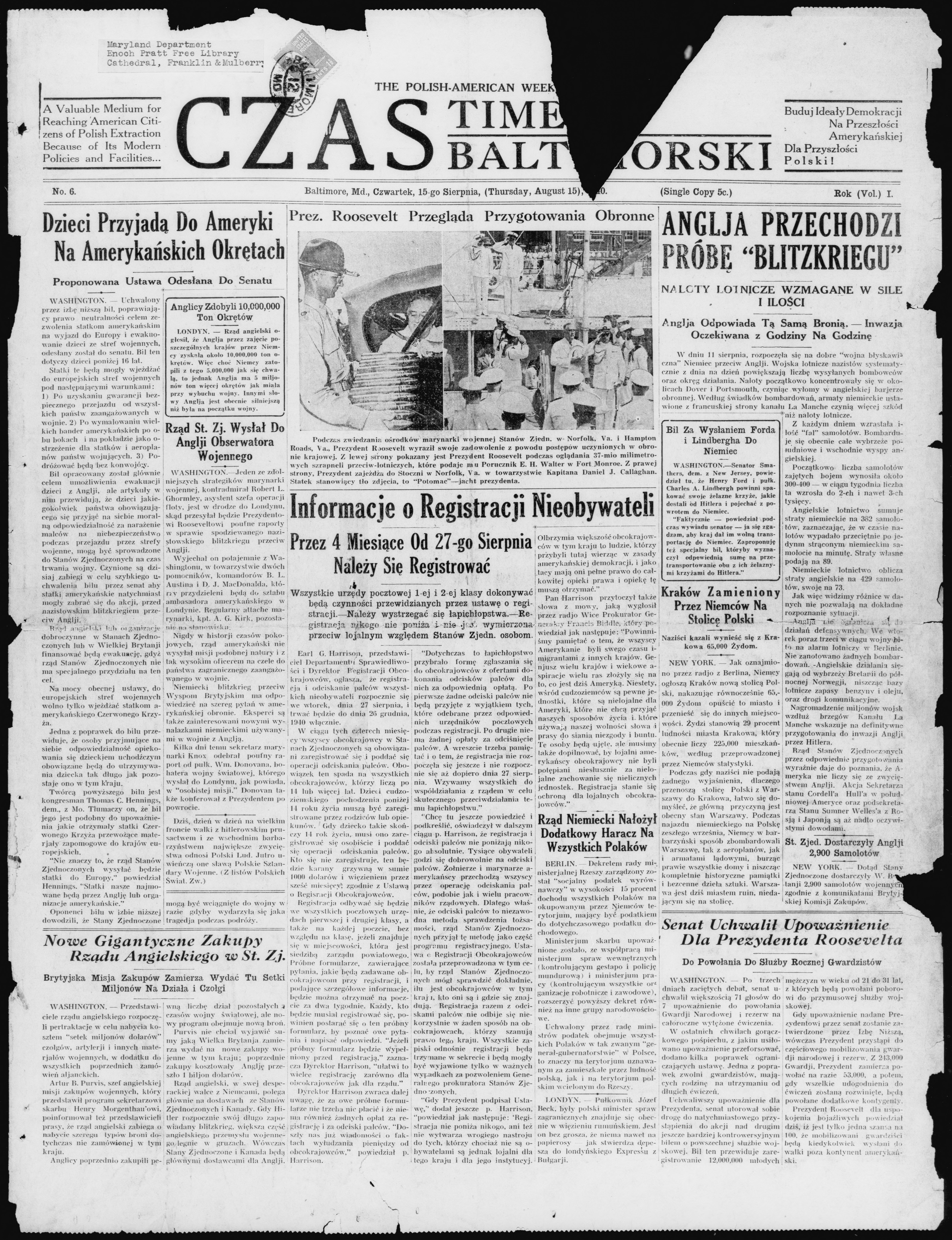
The cover page of the August 15, 1940 issue of Czas Baltimorski.

- Czas Baltimorski, a Polish-language newspaper.
- Friends of the Hearth, an early Polish-language newspaper geared toward Baltimore Polonia.
- Polish Times, a Polish-American newspaper.

== Russian-American ==
- Kaskad (Cascade), a Russian newspaper founded by a Jewish immigrant from Belarus. The newspaper is aimed at the Russian-speaking community of immigrants from Russia, Belarus, and other Russian-speaking areas. Many of the readers are Jewish immigrants from the former Soviet Union.
- The News Exchange, a bilingual Russian-English newspaper created to facilitate the integration of Russian-Jewish immigrants into American society, established in May, 1978, by the Baltimore branch of the HIAS.
- Poleznai︠a︡ gazeta / Poleznaya gazeta, a Russian-language newspaper published in Baltimore, Brooklyn, and Pennsylvania.

== See also ==
- Ethnic groups in Baltimore
