= Wide angle =

Wide angle may refer to:

- Wide-angle lens, a type of camera lens
- Wide Angle (film), a 2024 movie
- Wide Angle (TV series), a television series
- Wide Angle, a 1999 album by Hybrid
- Wide Angles, a 2003 album by Michael Brecker
- Wide-angle X-ray scattering
- Wide Angle Youth Media
