= Ben Claassen III =

American artist (born 1977)

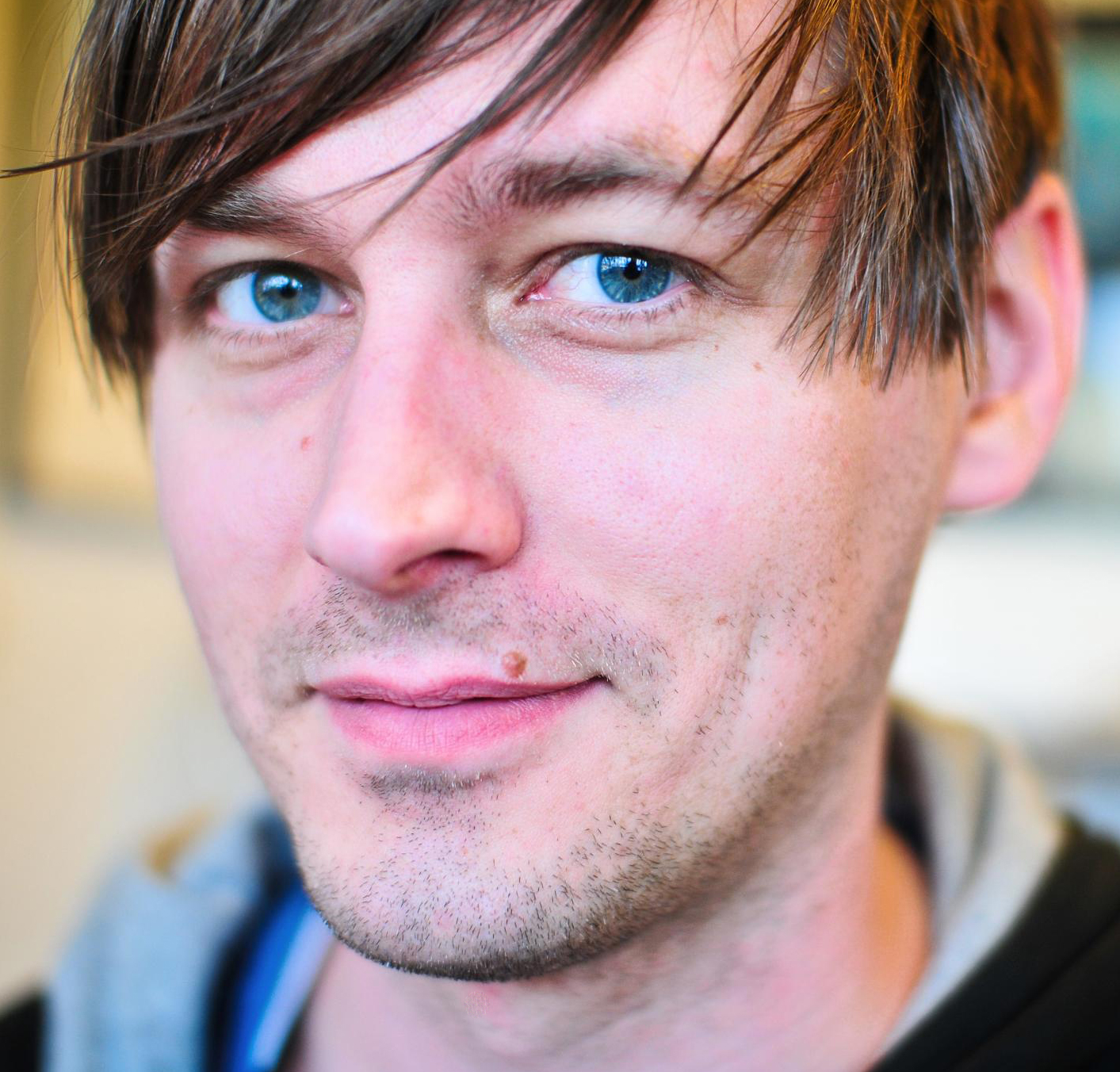
- Born: October 1, 1977 (age 49) New Orleans
- Areas: Cartoonist, Writer, Artist

Ben Claassen III is a comics artist and illustrator originally from New Orleans, Louisiana who frequently works with non-traditional media such as stencils, long exposure photography, sign painting techniques, and the use of stop-motion animation via a Game Boy Camera. He is best known for his illustrations in Wil Wheaton's first book, Dancing Barefoot, weekly illustrations in The Washington Post, and for the weekly comic strip, DIRTFARM.

DIRTFARM has appeared in several alternative weekly publications, including Washington City Paper, Baltimore City Paper, the Chicago Reader, Dagens Nyheter, Antigravity Magazine, The St. John Sun Times, and the Chattanooga Pulse.

Claassen co-created and illustrated killoggs.com, which was an early social media site started in 1999 that has since gone private.

In addition to his other work, Claassen keeps a daily comic journal, does work as a freelance illustrator / graphic designer, and paints large paintings (which are on permanent display at Galaxy Hut in Arlington, VA & Spacebar in Falls Church, VA).
