= WERQ-FM =

Urban contemporary radio station in Baltimore

Coordinates: 39.339°N 76.667°W

- Baltimore, Maryland; United States
- Broadcast area: Baltimore metropolitan area
- Frequency: 92.3 MHz (HD Radio)
- Branding: 92Q Jams

Programming
- Language: English
- Format: Urban contemporary
- Subchannels: HD2: WWIN (Urban gospel); HD3: WOLB (Urban talk)

Ownership
- Owner: Urban One; (Radio One Licenses, LLC)
- Sister stations: WOLB; WWIN; WWIN-FM

History
- First air date: January 30, 1961
- Former call signs: WYOU (1960–1961); WSID-FM (1961–1969); WLPL (1969–1981); WYST (1981–1982); WYST-FM (1982–1991)

Technical information
- Licensing authority: FCC
- Facility ID: 68827
- Class: B
- ERP: 37,000 watts
- HAAT: 174 meters (571 ft)

Links
- Public license information: Public file; LMS
- Webcast: Listen live; Listen live (via Audacy); Listen live (via iHeartRadio)
- Website: 92q.com

WERQ-FM (92.3 FM) is a commercial radio station in Baltimore, Maryland. It features an urban contemporary radio format and is owned by Urban One of Silver Spring, Maryland, the largest broadcasting company serving African American audiences in the United States. The studios are located in Woodlawn (they were previously located at Cathy Hughes Plaza in downtown Baltimore).

WERQ-FM has an effective radiated power of 37,000 watts. The transmitter is on Park Heights Avenue at Boarman Avenue in the Park Heights section of Baltimore. WERQ-FM broadcasts using HD Radio technology; the HD2 digital subchannel carries urban gospel programming from co-owned WWIN, while the HD3 subchannel simulcasts the black talk programming of WOLB.

== History ==
=== WYOU and WSID-FM ===
The station signed on the air on January 30, 1961. WYOU was the sister station to WSID (1010 AM), initially using a call sign that owner United Broadcasting had previously used at a station it had just sold in Virginia. On October 2, 1961, WYOU became WSID-FM, reflecting its affiliated AM outlet. Because the AM station was a daytimer, during its first few years, WSID-FM would simulcast much of WSID's urban contemporary programming in mono. After sunset, the programming continued on the FM station only and it would sign off at midnight.

By September 1968, WSID-FM broke away from the AM programs for several hours each day for a separate underground rock format, which was gradually expanded to full-time by the end of the year.

=== WLPL ===
The call letters for the station under the new rock format became WLPL. The WLPL call sign stood for Wonderful Land of Pleasant Listening. In 1969, WLPL expanded its operating hours to full-time, while shifting toward a mixture of Top 40 and album rock musical selections.

By 1972, the station made a transition to a full-time Top 40 format and began broadcasting in FM stereo. WLPL was a popular Top 40 station under the management of its founder, United Broadcasting Company (UBC) of Bethesda, Maryland. In 1977, WLPL-FM program director Bill Parris was named "Major Market Top 40 Program Director of The Year" by the Billboard magazine, largely due to his work at WLPL.

Notable personalities during this period were Kris Earl Phillips, The "Smoker", Don O'Brien, Casey Jones, Hal Martin, Michael St. John (John Moen), and Gary Michaels aka The Boogie Man (Gary Rau).

However, ratings deteriorated when WBSB (now WZFT) launched in 1980, as "B104" with a similar Top 40 format. WLPL was forced to operate under reduced transmitter power during this period, due to a fire in the station's broadcast tower equipment.

=== WYST-FM ===
WLPL ended its Top 40 format in the summer of 1981, becoming WYST on November 16. The FM suffix was added the next year. WYST was an oldies-based adult contemporary format under the name "92 Star". Initially, ratings were favorable for WYST, but began slipping shortly thereafter.

In February 1991, WYST shifted its format to a hot adult contemporary approach. The strategy failed because the heritage hot AC station, WWMX, was too well established. WYST's ratings declined and by mid-1991, WYST was among Baltimore's lowest-rated radio stations.

=== WERQ-FM ===
The history of 92Q began on August 16. WYST's parent company, UBC, flipped the station to a rhythmic contemporary approach, under the nickname 92Q. One month later, the Federal Communications Commission (FCC) granted the WERQ call letters. The original concept for 92Q was formulated by UBC's vice-president of Programming William Parris, who had an extensive background in the Top 40 radio format. The startup program director of 92Q was Jeffrey Ballentine.

Steve Kingston (program director of Z100 in New York) and David Tate (of Rantel Research, Inc., of Laurel, Maryland) were the principal consultants on this new venture. Both Kingston and Tate were former employees of United Broadcasting Company during the 1970s, and later, they were both competitors against UBC's WYST, while serving together at WBSB-FM, during the 1980s.

After the introduction of 92Q, WERQ's ratings increased rapidly, at the expense of WBSB's Top 40 format. (WBSB changed to a hot AC format as WVRT in 1992). Longtime urban station WXYV abandoned the format for Top 40 in 1997. Initially, 92Q was more Dance music-oriented, with a handful of pop records in its musical mixture, but the format would gradually shift toward "CHUrban" (a hybrid of Top 40 and urban contemporary) by the end of 1991. Over time, 92Q moved to a pure Urban Contemporary format.

=== Urban One ownership ===
In the Fall of 1993, United Broadcasting Company began divesting its holdings in radio stations after the death of its founder Richard Eaton, and sold WERQ-FM to Radio One (later renamed Urban One). By 1995, WERQ was classified as a full-fledged mainstream urban format.

Since 1996, WERQ has been one of the highest-rated stations in Baltimore, according to the Arbitron ratings company, and later Nielsen ratings.
