= WOLB =

Radio station in Baltimore, Maryland

Coordinates: 39°18′6.4″N 76°34′7.9″W

- Baltimore, Maryland; United States
- Broadcast area: Baltimore, Maryland
- Frequency: 1010 kHz
- Branding: Newstalk 1010 WOLB AM

Programming
- Language: English
- Format: Urban talk
- Affiliations: Premiere Networks

Ownership
- Owner: Urban One; (Radio One Licenses, LLC)
- Sister stations: WERQ-FM; WWIN; WWIN-FM

History
- First air date: November 27, 1947
- Former call signs: WSID (1947–1982); WYST (1982–1991); WERQ (1991–1993)
- Former frequencies: 1570 kHz (1947–1950)
- Call sign meaning: WOL Baltimore

Technical information
- Licensing authority: FCC
- Facility ID: 54711
- Class: D
- Power: 250 watts day; 30 watts night
- Repeater: 92.3 WERQ-FM HD3 (Baltimore)

Links
- Public license information: Public file; LMS
- Webcast: Listen live
- Website: wolbbaltimore.com

WOLB (1010 AM) is an urban talk radio station in Baltimore, Maryland. The station is owned by Urban One and broadcasts from studios in Woodlawn and a transmitter in the Orangewood section of east Baltimore.

== History ==
=== WSID ===
WSID launched at 1570 kHz on November 27, 1947. Owned by Sidney H. Tinley, Jr., the station was in Essex and broadcast with 1,000 watts during the daytime on 1570 kHz. The station's location became part of its argument against prosecution for broadcasting crime news in 1948. An old Baltimore law prohibited the practice, and five Baltimore-area stations were cited for contempt of the law; Essex-based WSID claimed the Baltimore city court lacked jurisdiction over the station. Ultimately, it was found not guilty, though the other stations in the proceeding were cited.

The same month that WSID was acquitted, Tinley filed to sell WSID for $65,000 to the United Broadcasting Company, which owned radio station WOOK (1600 AM) in Silver Spring; the sale was granted in June. WOOK, which moved to 1340 kHz in 1951, was the first radio station in the Washington, D.C., area to serve the African-American community, and United owner Richard Eaton immediately hired a black announcer for WSID. The station moved to 1010 kHz in July 1950. Two years later, the city of license was modified to officially serve both Essex and Baltimore; the Essex main studio was closed in 1956, at which time the license moved entirely into Baltimore. Jocko Henderson began his broadcasting career as "Doug Henderson" at WSID in 1952. In 1959, Pauline Wells Lewis began her gospel music show, "Inspiration Time", on WSID; she continued with WSID-AM-FM until 1983 and remained a fixture on Baltimore radio until shortly before her death in 1998. Paul "Fat Daddy" Johnson, who worked at several Baltimore stations, found appeal among black and white audiences alike.

United also began adding additional broadcasting outlets in Baltimore, with the January 1961 launch of WYOU (soon renamed WSID-FM and today WERQ-FM); in 1967, after nearly 14 years of delays, WMET-TV channel 24 launched as the first independent TV station in the city. WMET-TV, which broadcast some local programming (including a gospel show hosted by Wells Lewis) but mostly simulcast sister station WOOK-TV/WFAN-TV in Washington, closed in January 1972. WSID-AM-FM had moved in 1965 to the Avalon Theater on Park Heights Avenue, which was also converted for WMET-TV's use; the radio studios occupied the former manager's office and production room, and the auditorium was converted into a TV studio.

Legal problems became a major issue at many United stations at the end of the 1960s, with a number of them facing challenges to their license renewals. (WOOK and WFAB in Miami lost their licenses outright.) WSID's license renewal application, filed in 1969, remained pending for over a decade; it was still unresolved when Eaton died in 1981.

=== WYST/WERQ ===
On December 23, 1982, the WSID call letters were dropped in favor of WYST, the moniker that had been adopted by the FM station—then WLPL—when it became "Star 92" the year before. WYST AM aired a gold-leaning adult contemporary format, with longtime Baltimore DJ Jack Edwards in mornings.

In 1981, SRW, Inc., challenged the licenses of United's Baltimore radio stations. SRW, owned by then-Maryland state senate president Melvin Steinberg, ultimately dropped its challenge to the AM station and focused on obtaining the WYST-FM license; United paid $400,000 to Steinberg to settle the FM license challenge, the last pending for the once-embattled chain, in November 1985. United also invested in the AM station, which received a new tower and began broadcasting at night in early 1986; however, it also reduced its daytime power to 250 watts.

In 1989, Richard Eaton's estate agreed to sell WYST-AM-FM as part of a $132.5 million buyout of the company, including its nine radio stations and a 35,000-subscriber cable system in Manchester, New Hampshire. The sale agreement expired in January 1990, however, and the deal was not consummated.

WYST-AM-FM, by that point a simulcast, relaunched as WERQ-AM-FM "92Q" with a rhythmic contemporary hit radio format on August 16, 1991. In 1992, WERQ dropped the FM simulcast to begin airing the audio of CNN Headline News.

=== WOLB ===
United finally found a buyer for WERQ-AM-FM in 1993 when Radio One purchased the two stations for $9 million. On November 19, 1993, WERQ became talk outlet WOLB, initially simulcasting its WOL in Washington, D.C. In 1995, WOL and WOLB programming began to be originated from Radio One's new Baltimore studios.

In 2015, the Federal Communications Commission ruled against WOLB in a case where a proposed facilities upgrade would have conflicted with an application from WIOO in Carlisle, Pennsylvania.
