= Frederick Raine =

German-American journalist and diplomat (1821–1893)

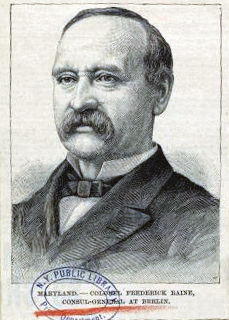
- Maryland-Colonel Frederick Raine, Consul-General at Berlin
- Born: May 13, 1821; Minden, Prussia
- Died: February 26, 1893 (aged 71)
- Occupation: Journalist

Frederick Raine (May 13, 1821 – February 26, 1893) was a German-American newspaper editor and later diplomat.

== Biography ==
Frederick Raine was born May 13, 1821, in Minden, Prussia, modern day North Rhine-Westphalia, Germany. Other sources date his birth to May 13, 1823. Raine’s ancestors were from England and Westphalia.

Raine started his newspaper career as an apprentice. At 14 Raine began working with his uncle Frederick Wundermann in his Munster print shop. Raine also worked as an assistant editor for his uncle’s newspaper Westfälische Zeitung (Westphalian Newspaper). In the autumn of 1840, Raine joined his father and brother Wilhelm in Baltimore, Maryland, where they had moved four years earlier. Raine’s father was a publisher and owned a print shop in Baltimore. When Raine arrived he first started working for his father’s Whig campaign paper Der Demokratische Whig (Democratic Whig). In 1841, at nineteen, Raine founded the German-language newspaper Der Deutsche Correspondent in Baltimore. Raine depended on his father’s print shop and brother’s assistance during the first years of the paper’s existence.

Historians refer to Raine as a Democrat. Though Raine supported states’ rights preceding the Civil War, he supported the preservation of the Union over secession and the continuation of slavery. Raine increasingly became involved in civic and governmental affairs. As Governor Oden Bowie awarded Raine the ceremonial title of colonel, by which Raine was often referred to for the remainder of his life. In 1885 President Grover Cleveland appointed Raine consul-general in Berlin. Raine return to Baltimore from Berlin in 1889 and remained a prominent German-American figure in the region, appearing at public events in Baltimore and Philadelphia. Raine suffered from a mild stroke on February 24, 1893, and died two days later on February 26. On November 6, 1897, the Frederick Raine Medal was established. The annual prize was to be awarded to the Baltimore City College student “most proficient in the study of the German language and German literature.”
