= Il Risorgimento Italiano Nel Maryland =

Italian-language Baltimore Newspaper

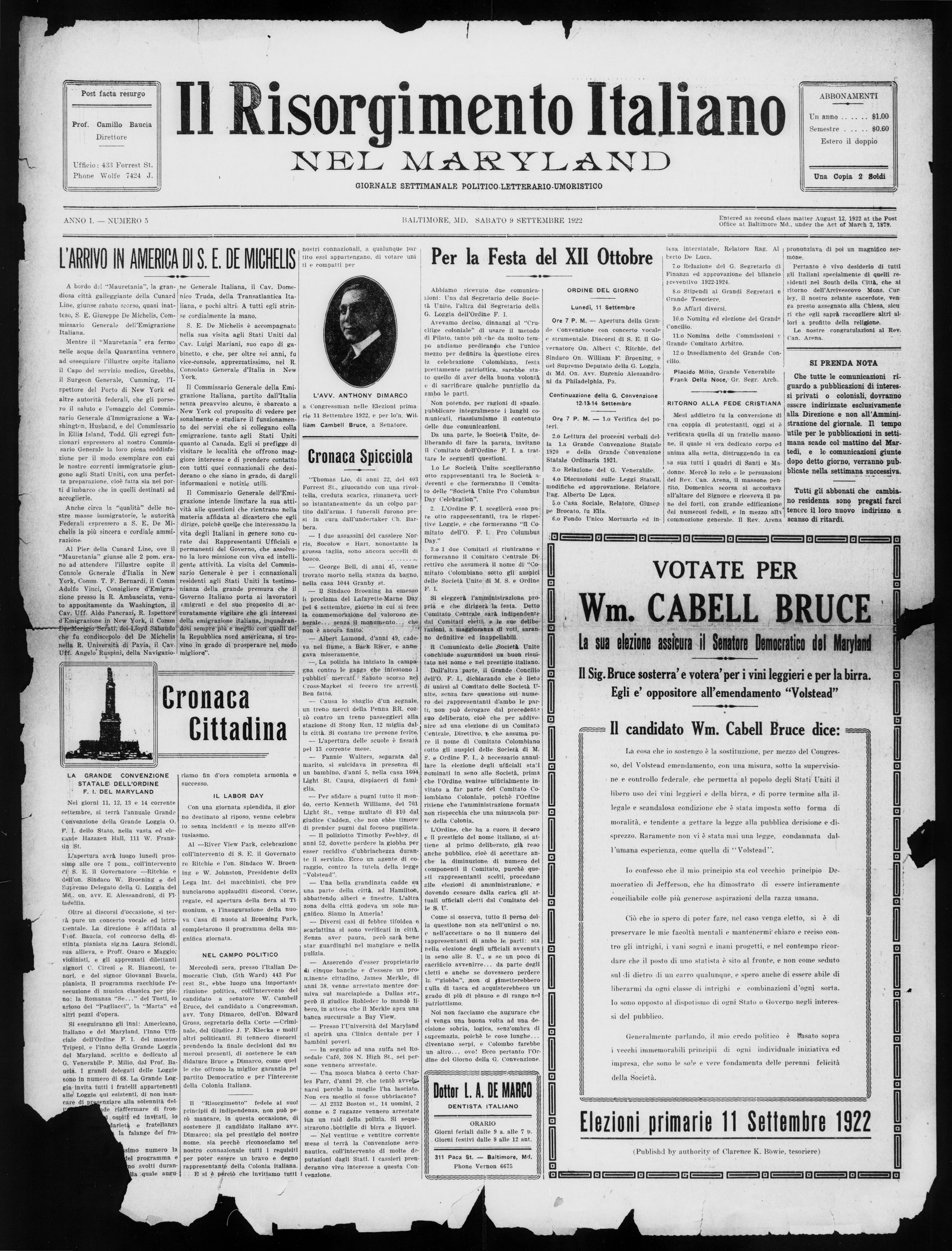
- The front page for the September 9, 1922 issue of "Il Risorgimento Italiano nel Maryland".
- Type: Weekly newspaper
- Publisher: Italian Revival Co.
- Editor: Camillo Baucia
- Founded: 1922
- Political alignment: Democratic
- Headquarters: Baltimore, Maryland
- OCLC number: 20661375

Il Risorgimento Italiano Nel Maryland was a weekly Italian-language newspaper published from 1922 to at least 1930 in Baltimore, Maryland. It was named for Risorgimento, the 1860s movement for the unification of Italy.

== History ==
The paper was published by the Italian Revival Company, led by president Vincent Ambrose, and was edited by Camillo Baucia, an Italian immigrant from Cuneo in the Piedmont region of Italy. It largely served the Italian population of Baltimore, which was originally centered in the Little Italy neighborhood near Baltimore's Inner Harbor and Fell's Point. It provided coverage of Italian-American society and culture in the Baltimore area. It is unclear when the paper published its last issue, but the latest that has been digitized by the Library of Congress for the National Digital Newspaper Program was the December 27, 1930 issue.

== Editor and politics ==
The editor of the paper was Camillo Baucia, a professional musician known for his feats of endurance on the piano, as he could reportedly play for a continuous fifty hours. He exhibited his skills at theatres and venues around the country, including Baltimore's Lyric Theater. Baucia was involved in the Italian-American community in Baltimore, organizing such events as the 1922 Garibaldi Society picnic and annual celebrations of Columbus Day. He was the president of the Dante National Association's Baltimore chapter.

Baucia was himself politically aligned with the Democratic Party, something which showed itself in the paper. The paper faced controversy among the American audience in the wake of World War I and the rise of Fascism in Europe. Baucia became fascinated with Benito Mussolini’s rise to power and attempted to create a Baltimore fascist group. In the midst of the Great Depression and the controversy surrounding the paper, it folded in 1930.

== See also ==
- Ethnic press in Baltimore
