= Czas Baltimorski =

1941 Polish-language newspaper from Baltimore

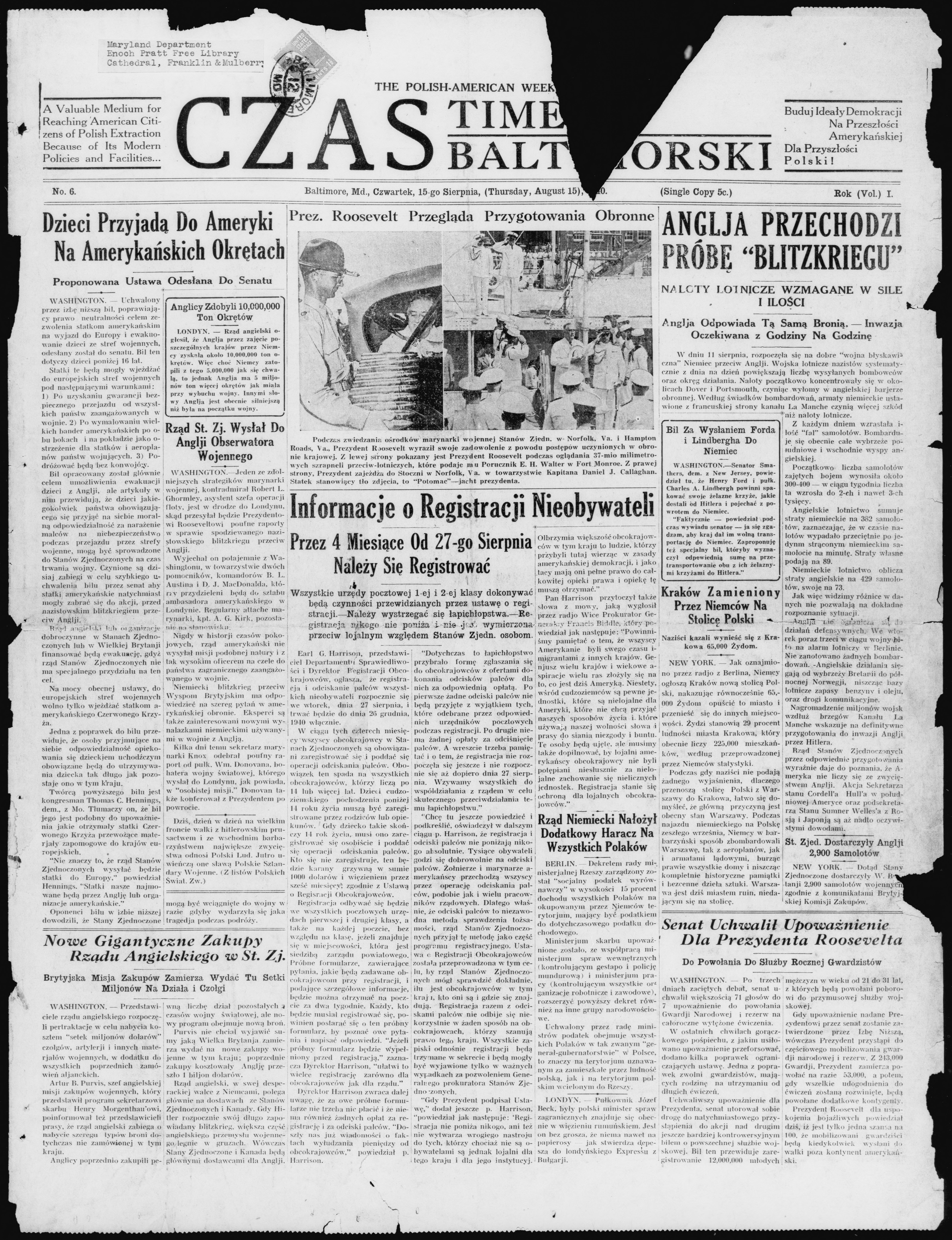
- The cover page of the August 15, 1940 issue of Czas Baltimorski
- Type: Weekly newspaper
- Founder(s): Wladyslaw A. Wusza
- Publisher: Polish-American Times, Inc.
- Founded: July 11, 1940
- Language: Polish
- Headquarters: Baltimore, Maryland
- OCLC number: 18793111

Czas Baltimorski (lit. Baltimore Times) was a short-lived weekly Polish-language newspaper that began publication on July 11, 1940, in Baltimore, Maryland. It was published by the Polish-American Times, Inc. with Wladyslaw A. Wusza as founding editor. Wusza and his English language editor Stanley A. Ciesielski were both young, second generation Polish-Americans, and Wusza's father had been editor of a Polish-language newspaper in New York City.

Czas Baltimorski chronicled developments in Europe with an emphasis on Poland, in addition to reporting on local events, sports, and religious and cultural news of interest to the Polish-American community in Baltimore. Both editors enlisted in the United States armed forces after the attack on Pearl Harbor in December 1941; after their service, Wusza was an economic advisor to the post-war Polish government, and Ciesielski served in the Central Intelligence Agency until his retirement, when he became president of the Polish Heritage Association.

The exact date that publication of the Czas ceased is unknown; the last issue digitized by the Library of Congress was the January 23, 1941 issue.

== See also ==
- Ethnic press in Baltimore
- History of the Poles in Baltimore
