= Erricka Bridgeford =

African American activist from Baltimore

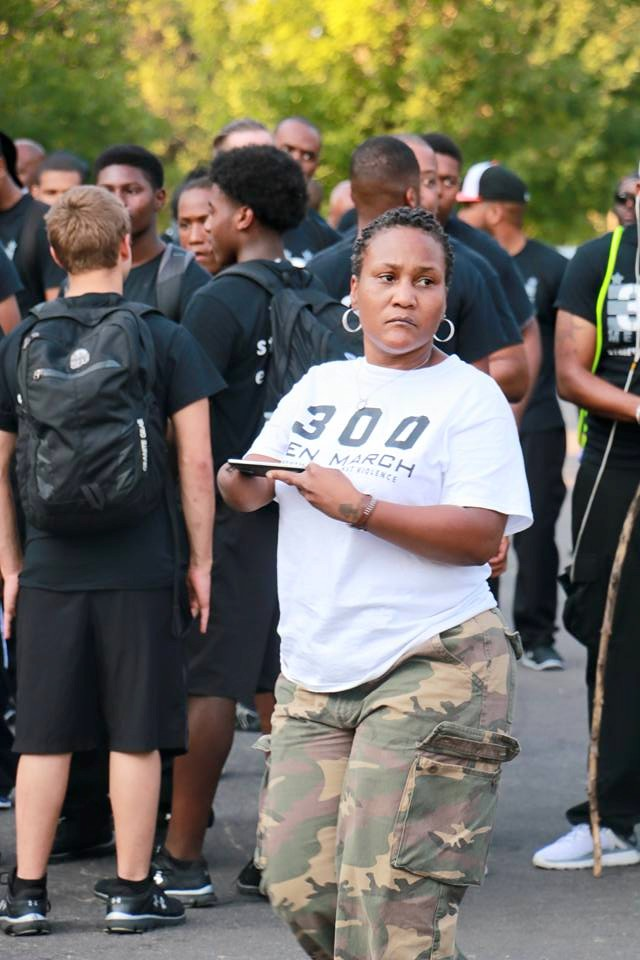
- Bridgeford in 2013
- Born: October 9, 1972 (age 53); Baltimore, Maryland, U.S.
- Known for: Activism
- Title: Executive Director, Baltimore Community Mediation Center

Erricka Bridgeford is an African American activist from Baltimore. She worked to get Maryland's death penalty law repealed in 2013, and founded and co-organizes quarterly 72-hour "Ceasefire" weekends. Baltimore Ceasefire weekends began in 2017, in the hope of reducing violence. Erricka was named 2017's Marylander of the Year by The Baltimore Sun.

== Early life ==
Bridgeford was born on October 9, 1972, the oldest of four children. She grew up in Normount Court, a housing project in West Baltimore. Her family was close-knit, and her parents, she said in an interview, were like "the Huxtables of the ghetto," serving as surrogate parents to other young people in the neighborhood. The area was poor but not plagued with violence until the 1980s and 90s. Since then she has lost a brother, a stepson, two cousins (who were brothers), and several friends to gun violence.

As a result of Amniotic Band Syndrome, Bridgeford was born without a right hand, and with four fingers on her left hand.

== Career ==
Bridgeford began her career working for an organization devoted to infant wellness. In 2001 she trained as a volunteer at the Baltimore Community Mediation Center; two months later she was hired, and in 2002 she became their director of training. In 2005, Erricka became Director of Training at Community Mediation Maryland where she provided training to the 18 community mediation centers in Maryland, as well as to state agencies and organizations. In 2020, she was named Executive Director at Baltimore Community Mediation Center.

On February 3, 2018, she made a guest appearance on the online children's web series, Danny Joe's Tree House.

== Activism ==
Bridgeford has been involved in community activism since the late 1990s. The death of her brother David in 2007 inspired her to focus on ending violence.

=== Death penalty repeal ===
Bridgeford began advocating for repeal of the death penalty in Maryland in 2009. Along with several other survivors of homicide victims, she testified before the Maryland legislature, spoke repeatedly to the press, and shared her personal story at rallies and other events. She argued that justice could not be gained through revenge, and that the death penalty was a form of revenge. "It's not justice to me to have another dead body in place of my brother's dead body," she said in an interview. Bridgeford believed the death penalty only brought more pain and failed to honor the victims; she suggested to a CBS reporter that the money Maryland saved by repealing the death penalty could be used to provide services to the victims' families. Senator Bobby Zirkin later cited the testimony of homicide survivors such as Bridgeford as a major factor in his decision to support the repeal. The death penalty was repealed in Maryland in 2013.

=== Support for survivors of homicide victims ===
Bridgeford worked with a coalition of murder victims' family members and organizations to support Maryland House Bill 0355 (Programs for Survivors of Homicide Victims). The bill was designed to identify survivors of homicide victims as a group of victims, and to ensure yearly funding. The bill passed and was approved by the governor on April 14, 2015. Maryland became the second state in the United States to provide specific funds and resources to murder victims' family members.

The same year, Senator Lisa Gladden introduced Senate Bill 0512, which called for the Criminal Injuries Compensation Board to include a survivor of homicide. At the hearing, Gladden said that she was inspired by Bridgeford's advocacy for homicide survivors, and believed that someone who had lost a loved one to homicide should be included on the Board that makes decisions about providing resources to victims' families. The bill was signed into law on April 14, 2014.

=== Baltimore Ceasefire 365 ===
The idea for a ceasefire weekend was first suggested by hip-hop artist Ogun, who was working with Bridgeford on a rally for the anti-violence group 300 Men March. In 2017, with Baltimore's murder rate climbing, Bridgeford revisited the idea with Ogun and several other activists and began planning. The idea was to see if the community could go 72 hours without a shooting, stabbing, or any other kind of violence; their motto was "Nobody kill anybody." In addition, the effort rallied citizens to create and attend life-affirming events for 72 hours, while accepting the Baltimore Peace Challenge.

The first Ceasefire took place the first weekend in August, and drew thousands of residents to special community events and activities. The second Ceasefire weekend, held in November, was even larger. Events included basketball tournaments, a yoga class, art exhibits, a sip-and-paint, a peace walk, and a campout. During the November 2017 ceasefire weekend, Tony Mason was killed, and then, the weekend continued with 48 hours of zero shootings. During the third ceasefire weekend in February 2018, there were zero homicides. This was the first weekend in 2018 in which no Baltimore residents were killed. The February 2018 ceasefire also began a stretch of 11.5 days without murder in Baltimore. This was the first time the city had experienced this since March 2014. Bridgeford gave credit to everyone in the city who had been tirelessly doing good work for years.

When murders occurred during the first two Baltimore Ceasefire weekends, residents were called to show up at the murder locations to pour light and love into the space and into the traumatized community. This began a new campaign, "Don't Be Numb", which encourages Baltimoreans to notice when people are killed, and to remember that each life lost is a loss for all of Baltimore. This also gave birth to Sacred Space Rituals, in which residents go to murder locations to make them sacred ground.

Bridgeford's efforts started a grassroots movement and "awakened a sense that the cycle of killing can be broken and that the power to do it lies in our own hands." She was named Marylander of the Year "for bringing hope to Baltimore in some of its bleakest hours." In 2020, research published by the American Journal for Public Health showed that there was an estimated 52% reduction in gun violence during ceasefire days and no evidence of a postponement effect on either the next 3 days or the next 3-day weekend following each ceasefire weekend.

In 2022, Baltimore Ceasefire 365 was renamed as Baltimore Peace Movement.

== Awards and distinctions ==
- 2017: Marylander of the Year, The Baltimore Sun
- 2017: Gloria Hertzfelt Unsung Award, Baltimore State's Attorney's Office
- 2017: Invited to give a TED Talk
- 2017: Peacemaker of the Year, Baltimore Community Mediation Center
- 2017: Best Baltimorean, City Paper
- 2015: Outstanding Volunteer Contribution to Victim's Services, Maryland Governor's Office of Crime Control and Prevention
- 2023: Harriet Tubman & Women’s History Achievement Award, The Maryland Commission on African American History:
- 2023: Chief Judge Robert M. Bell Award for Outstanding Contribution to Alternative Dispute Resolution in Maryland, MD State Bar Association
- Films: Erricka appears in Charm City, is featured in SAGE, and is featured The Body Politic, which was nominated for an Emmy in 2025
