= Painting with a Twist =

Painting With a Twist
- Industry: Paint and Sip
- Founded: December 8, 2007
- Founders: Renee Maloney, co-founder Cathy Deano, co-founder
- Headquarters: Mandeville, Louisiana
- Number of locations: 320+
- Website: www.paintingwithatwist.com

Painting with a Twist is the largest company in the paint and sip industry; their headquarters are located in Mandeville, Louisiana. Founded in 2007, Painting with a Twist offers live painting events accompanied by wine or cocktails with in its studio locations. Events are held in local studios owned and operated by independent franchisees. Studio artists guide guests step-by-step as they create a personalized painting. Events typically last two hours and guests take home their artwork. All art supplies are provided.

== History ==
Painting with a Twist was founded by Cathy Deano and Renee Maloney in 2007. The business was initially named Corks N Canvas. However, after opening their fourth store in the New Orleans, Louisiana area, Deano and Maloney decided to franchise the concept in 2009.
