= WKC (Baltimore) =

Radio station in Baltimore, Maryland

- Baltimore, Maryland; United States
- Broadcast area: Baltimore

Programming
- Language: English

Ownership
- Owner: Joseph M. Zamoiski Company

History
- First air date: 1922
- Last air date: 1923
- Former call signs: 3RM

Technical information
- Licensing authority: Department of Commerce

WKC was a radio station, located in Baltimore, Maryland, that was licensed to the Joseph M. Zamoiski Company from March 23, 1922 until its deletion on November 24, 1923. It was the first broadcasting station licensed in the state of Maryland, and one of the first in the United States.

== History ==
=== 3RM ===
WKC was set up by Calman "Cal" J. Zamoiski, who operated amateur station 3RM from his home at 2527 Madison Avenue in Baltimore.

The Department of Commerce regulated radio stations in the United States from 1912 until the 1927 formation of the Federal Radio Commission. Originally there were no restrictions on which stations could make broadcasts intended for the general public, and a variety of stations holding amateur and experimental licenses engaged in broadcasting. Beginning with a November 13, 1921 service conducted by Rev. Dr. Francis T. Tagg, the Maryland Radio Association organized a weekly series of religious broadcasts. A week after the inaugural broadcast, a joint effort was made in association with the Har Sinai Temple, with Mrs. E. T. Paul singing Hamil's "Holy Art Thou" over W. H. Davis' amateur station, 3FE, followed by a sermon by Rabbi Louis Bernstein originating at Zamoiski's 3RM.

=== WKC ===
Effective December 1, 1921, the Commerce department adopted regulations formally establishing a broadcasting station category, which set aside the wavelength of 360 meters (833 kHz) for entertainment broadcasts, and 485 meters (619 kHz) for farm market and weather reports. This also prohibited amateur stations from making further broadcasts, as it restricted broadcasting to only stations holding a Limited Commercial license.

Following the adoption of the new regulations, the Joseph M. Zamoiski Company, at 19 North Liberty Street, was issued a Limited Commercial license on March 23, 1922, for a new station on the shared 360 meter "entertainment" wavelength. The station was installed on the building's top floor, and the call letters, WKC, were randomly assigned from a roster of available call signs. WKC was the first broadcasting station licensed in the state of Maryland.

Early broadcasts included an April 1 broadcast from 7:30 to 8:30 p.m. featuring local performers, and an April 4 performance by Van and Schenck of the Ziegfeld Follies theatrical revue. In August, it was announced that WKC had increased transmitter power from 20 to 100 watts to match the power and coverage of 100-watt competitor WCAO, with a schedule of 8:00 to 10:30 p.m. on Tuesdays, Thursdays and Saturdays.

The Joseph M. Zamoiski Company specialized in electrical offerings such as lighting, and initially began selling radio equipment as a sideline. However, by the fall of 1923 radio sales had increased so much that the store announced it was liquidating its electrical fixtures and lamps, in order to concentrate on booming radio sales. However, the increased focus on radio did not include continuing to run a broadcasting station, and WKC was deleted on November 24, 1923.

Baltimore, Maryland radio station WKC

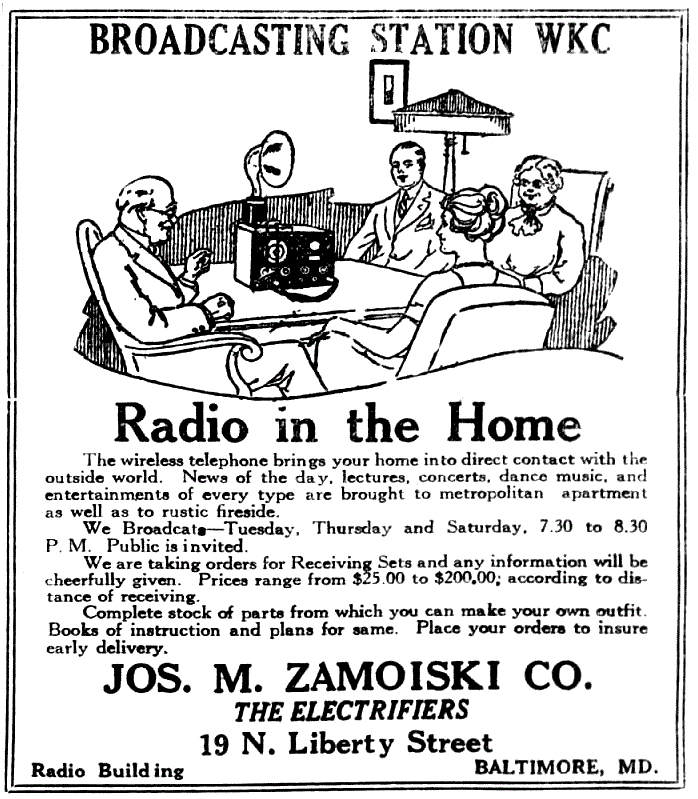
April 9, 1922 Joseph M. Zamoiski Company advertisement featuring WKC.

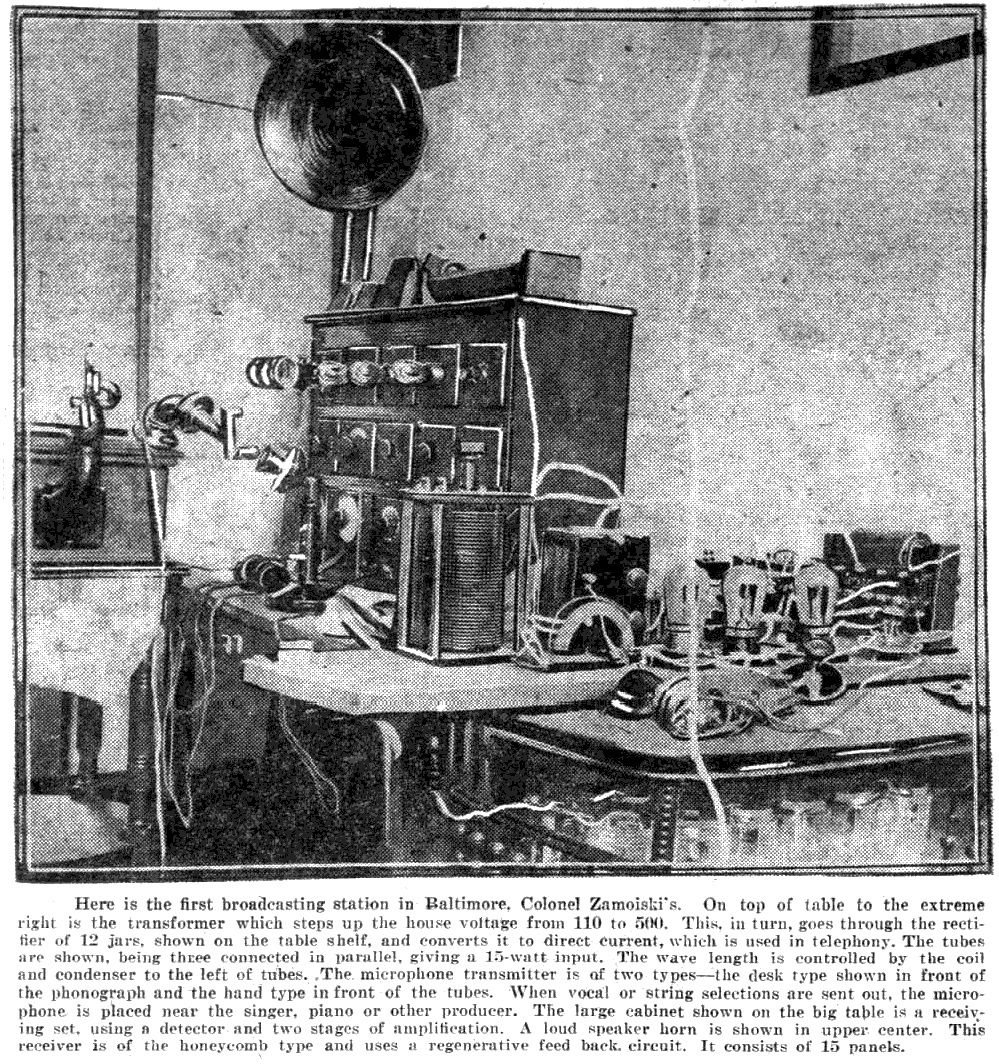
Original WKC transmitter assembled by Calman "Cal" J. Zamoiski.

== See also ==
- List of initial AM-band station grants in the United States
