= WFBR (AM) =

- Glen Burnie, Maryland; United States
- Broadcast area: Baltimore metropolitan area
- Frequency: 1590 kHz
- Branding: Famous 1590

Programming
- Format: Brokered multilingual

Ownership
- Owner: Multicultural Broadcasting; (Way Broadcasting Licensee, LLC)

History
- First air date: May 15, 1963; 62 years ago
- Former call signs: WISZ (1961–1977); WJRO (1977–2004)
- Call sign meaning: Homage to use by Baltimore station WFBR from 1924 to 1990.

Technical information
- Licensing authority: FCC
- Facility ID: 19673
- Class: B
- Power: 1,000 watts
- Transmitter coordinates: 39°10′36.4″N 76°37′18.9″W

Links
- Public license information: Public file; LMS
- Website: wfbr1590.weebly.com

WFBR (1590 AM, "Famous 1590") is a brokered programming radio station licensed to Glen Burnie, Maryland, and serving the Baltimore metropolitan area. The station broadcasts an ethnic, multilingual format and is owned by Multicultural Broadcasting, through licensee Way Broadcasting Licensee, LLC. The studios and transmitter are on 8th Avenue, Northwest in Glen Burnie.

WFBR broadcasts at 1,000 watts around the clock. To protect other stations on 1590 AM, as well as avoiding interference to WLXE in Rockville, Maryland, WFBR uses a directional antenna with a five-tower array.

== History ==
On May 15, 1963, the station first signed on the air. Its call letters were WISZ, powered at 500 watts and owned by Butch Gregory, a vice-president at Westinghouse. He built much of the equipment including an antenna phaser unit, and the main studio control console. R. J. ("Bob") Bennett was the first station manager. The program director was Matt Edwards. The initial format was what is now called adult standards but was identified by the station as a "Big band Sound".

Within two years the format switched to Country music with the addition of legendary country disc jockey Ray Davis, whose show was broadcast as a remote from Johnny's New and Used Cars (the "Walking Man's Friend). WISZ-FM on 95.9 MHz was added as a simulcast in 1962, broadcasting from a 90-foot tower in Brooklyn Park, Maryland. The transmitter was in a garden shed. WISZ-FM is today WWIN-FM.

WISZ's AM antenna was in a swamp off Crain Highway in Glen Burnie and consisted of seven towers (4 daytime, and four nighttime, with a common base tower). The directional pattern protected WINX in suburban Washington, D.C., on 1600 kHz, as well as other 1590 stations to the northeast. The "null" towards Washington was so pronounced that at certain points only a mile away, the towers could be seen but not heard. The station's mascot was an owl: "The WISZ Old Owl", pronouncing the call sign as "WISE".

The call letters were changed to WJRO on May 11, 1977. The station was assigned the WFBR call sign by the Federal Communications Commission (FCC) on November 30, 2004.

=== WFBR call sign history ===
From 1924 to 1990, the WFBR call letters had been assigned to a Baltimore station (now WJZ). This call sign was randomly assigned from the sequential list of available call signs; other new stations licensed the same month included WFBK (Hanover, New Hampshire), WFBL (Syracuse, New York), WFBM (Indianapolis, Indiana), WFBN (Bridgewater, Massachusetts), WFBQ (Raleigh, North Carolina), WFBT (Pitman, New Jersey) and WFBU (Boston, Massachusetts). A tradition later developed that WFBR could be rendered as "World's First Broadcasting Regiment". Another slogan, also derived from the call letters, was "First Baltimore Radio".
