= Der Deutsche Correspondent =

Defunct newspaper in Baltimore, Maryland, US

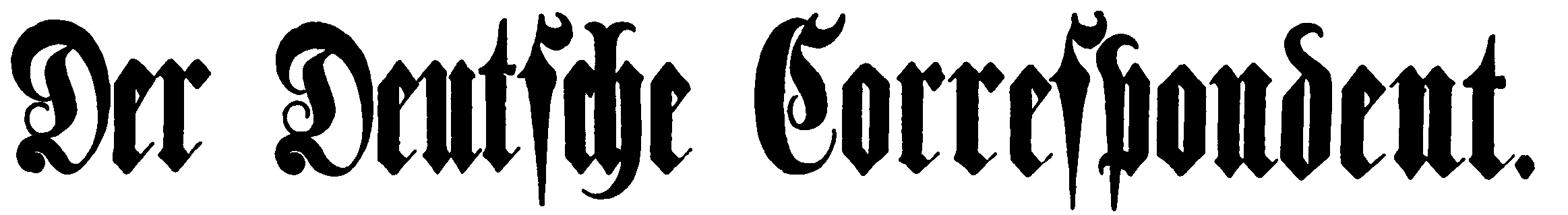

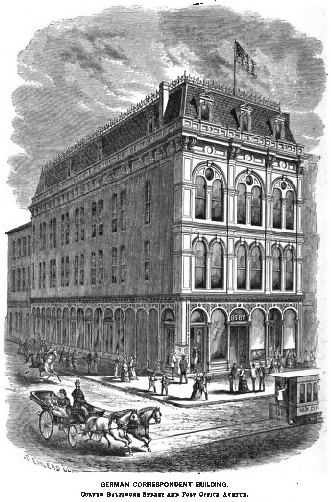
- The Raine Building, publishing location of Der Deutsche Correspondent, at 8587 East Baltimore Street, the southwest corner of Baltimore Street and Post Office Avenue (now known as Customs House Avenue), Baltimore, Maryland, circa 1869, prior to the great 1904 fire
- Type: Daily newspaper
- Format: Broadsheet
- Founder: Friedrich Raine
- Founded: 1841
- Ceased publication: April 28, 1918
- Circulation: 15,000

Der Deutsche Correspondent was a German-language newspaper in Baltimore, Maryland. It was the most influential newspaper among Germans in Baltimore, lasting longer than any of the other German newspapers in Maryland.

== History ==
Der Deutsche Correspondent was established in 1841 by Friedrich Raine, a member of a family of printers from Westphalia, Germany. Raine saw the need for a German-language newspaper in a city populated by a large number of Germans and established the newspaper at the age of 19. The paper started out with only eight subscribers, but circulation numbers climbed and quickly overtook two other German newspapers in Baltimore. During the 1880s and 1890s, its circulation reached about 15,000. Initially started as a weekly, the newspaper grew and eventually became a daily paper in 1848.

In the midst of the 1858 municipal election, outbreaks of violence occurred and the offices of Der Deutsche Correspondent were attacked.

The paper found difficulty in navigating its German and American heritages. In January 1917, it printed photos, poetry, and other printed fanfare for the Kaiser's birthday, but was warning Baltimore Germans not to support his war policies by the next.

The paper closed April 28, 1918, due to anti-German sentiment resulting from World War I. After the Correspondent closed, many of its employees began to work at Bayrische Wochenblatt, a newspaper that had been published in Baltimore since 1880. The two newspapers merged and became a German weekly, called the Baltimore Correspondent.

== Legacy ==
In 2009 The Maryland Historical Society received a grant from the Charles Edward Hilgenberg Fund of the Baltimore Community Foundation to digitize Der Deutsche Correspondent.

In March 2013 the University of Maryland Libraries announced that they would also be digitizing the Der Deutsche Correspondent. The content digitized by the University of Maryland are available as part of the historic newspaper database Chronicling America at the Library of Congress.

== Translations and transcriptions ==
- Ruppert, Gary B. The German Correspondent, Baltimore, Maryland: Translation and Transcription of Death Notices & Obituaries, 1879-1883 ISBN 9780788446023
- Ruppert, Gary B. The German Correspondent, Baltimore, Maryland: Translation and Transcription of Marriages, Deaths and Selected Articles of Genealogical Interest, 1879-1883 ISBN 9780788446030

== See also ==
- History of the Germans in Baltimore
- Ethnic press in Baltimore
