= WQSR =

Adult hits radio station in Baltimore

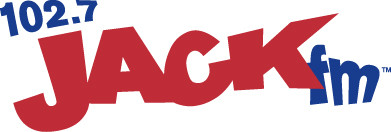
- Baltimore, Maryland; United States
- Broadcast area: Baltimore metropolitan area
- Frequency: 102.7 MHz (HD Radio)
- Branding: 102-7 Jack FM

Programming
- Language: English
- Format: Adult hits
- Subchannels: HD2: Urban gospel (simulcast of WCAO)
- Affiliations: iHeartRadio; Jack FM network; Premiere Networks

Ownership
- Owner: iHeartMedia; (iHM Licenses, LLC)
- Sister stations: WCAO; WPOC; WZFT

History
- First air date: December 15, 1947
- Former call signs: WCAO-FM (1947–1977); WXYV (1977–2001)
- Call sign meaning: WQSR, originally on 105.7, was intended to be part of ABC's "Super Radio" Network

Technical information
- Licensing authority: FCC
- Facility ID: 63778
- Class: B
- ERP: 50,000 watts (analog); 998 watts (digital)
- HAAT: 133 meters (436 ft)
- Transmitter coordinates: 39°23′11.3″N 76°43′50.9″W

Links
- Public license information: Public file; LMS
- Webcast: Listen live (via iHeartRadio)
- Website: 1027jackfm.iheart.com

WQSR (102.7 MHz, "102-7 Jack FM") is a commercial FM radio station licensed to Baltimore, Maryland. The station is owned by iHeartMedia through licensee iHM Licenses, LLC. It broadcasts an adult hits format, using the syndicated "Jack FM" service and trademark. There are no DJs. Instead, a prerecorded male voice representing himself as "Jack" makes sarcastic and ironic quips.

WQSR has an effective radiated power (ERP) of 50,000 watts. The transmitter is in Pikesville, next to the Pikesville Reservoir and the Baltimore Beltway (Interstate 695). The radio studios and offices are at The Rotunda Shopping Center in Baltimore.

== History ==
=== WCAO-FM (1947–1977) ===
On December 15, 1947, the station signed on as WCAO-FM, the sister station to WCAO (600 AM). WCAO-FM originally simulcasted WCAO, owned by the Monumental Broadcasting Company. WCAO-AM-FM were network affiliates of CBS Radio, carrying its dramas, comedies, news, sports, soap operas, game shows and big band broadcasts during the "Golden Age of Radio".

As network programming moved from radio to television, WCAO-AM-FM switched to a full service, middle of the road (MOR) format of popular music, news and sports. By the late 1960s/early 1970s, the two stations began airing separate programming, with WCAO-FM concentrating on classical music.

=== V-103 (1977–1997) ===
By 1977, the station was sold to Plough Broadcasting, a division of the pharmaceutical company Schering-Plough. WCAO-FM became WXYV on April 24. It aired programming for the African American community as V103, the major FM rival to both WWIN (1400 AM) and WEBB (1360 AM, now WQLL at 1370 AM). Originally playing automated disco music, WXYV eventually evolved into an urban contemporary format by the early 1980s. In the late 1980s and early 1990s, it was often Baltimore's top rated radio station.

By 1995, WXYV and then-sister station WCAO were sold to Granum Communications. The following year, the stations were sold again to Infinity Broadcasting, a division of CBS. That made it a sister station to Hot AC-formatted WWMX, Mix 106.5. (WCAO was later sold to Clear Channel Communications (now iHeartMedia), and eventually become a sister station to WQSR).

=== 102.7 XYV, and B102.7 (1997–2001) ===
On June 27, 1997, at noon, after having lost a large number of listeners to urban powerhouse WERQ (92.3 FM), WXYV became contemporary hit radio 102.7 XYV. The final song on "V103" was "It's So Hard to Say Goodbye to Yesterday" by Boyz II Men, while the first song on "102.7 XYV" was "Be My Lover" by La Bouche.

The new format started with a dance lean, before repositioning to a hip-hop lean, and then alternative; this was done in search of an audience. The station changed branding to B102.7 on August 7, 1998, shifting the playlist to a more mainstream direction the following year. WXYV and WWMX competed against each other due to the similarity of their formats, despite being sister stations. While WXYV had higher ratings than WWMX, the latter station had better advertising revenue, so WXYV was chosen to flip to end the competition."WXYV 102.7 Baltimore 1998 1999 2000".

=== WQSR (2001–2005) ===
On September 8, 2001, at 6 a.m., after playing "It's So Hard to Say Goodbye to Yesterday" by Boyz II Men, WQSR and its oldies format moved over from 105.7 FM to 102.7 FM. (WQSR programming was simulcast on both 102.7 and 105.7 to direct listeners to the new frequency). Two days later, the WXYV call sign moved to 105.7 and changed back to an urban contemporary format branding as X105.7, positioning itself against WERQ once again.

The call sign swap between the two stations took place four days later. In addition, WQSR acquired the rights to Baltimore Ravens games from sister station WLIF, and retained those rights until 2006, when WBAL (1090 AM) and WIYY (97.9 FM) took over. Musically, WQSR's playlist also changed a little, cutting back the pre-1964 songs and some 1980s music was introduced. By 2003, the station was playing mostly songs from 1964 to 1979, with a handful of pre-1964 and post-1979 titles.

=== Jack FM (2005–present) ===
On May 4, 2005, at 10:30 a.m., after playing "Na Na Hey Hey Kiss Him Goodbye" by Steam, the station began a half-hour stunt. Then, at 11 a.m., the station officially flipped to adult hits, branded as 102-7 Jack FM. The first song on "Jack" was "Get the Party Started" by Pink.

On December 15, 2008, CBS Radio announced that it would be swapping WQSR and four of its other medium-market radio stations to Clear Channel Communications for two radio stations, KLOL and KHMX in Houston. Clear Channel took over WQSR at 11:59 p.m. on Tuesday, March 31, 2009.

After playing songs at CBS Radio's Baltimore studios such as "End of the Road" by Boyz II Men, R.E.M.'s "It's the End of the World as We Know It (And I Feel Fine)" and "Goodbye Stranger" by Supertramp at roughly 11:57 p.m., the station went to dead air as Clear Channel officially took ownership of the station. Shortly thereafter, the station returned to the air at the Clear Channel Baltimore studios. The sale also resulted in the station reuniting with former sister station WCAO under common ownership for the first time since 1998.

Although there are no on-air personalities on the station, the station carries classic episodes of American Top 40: The 1980s, with host Casey Kasem, which are heard on Sunday evenings from 7 p.m. to 11 p.m. WQSR is one of two Jack-FM stations owned by iHeartMedia, with KJAQ in Seattle also under iHeart ownership.
