= The Baltimore Banner (strike paper) =

Strike newspaper in Baltimore, U.S. in 1965

The Baltimore Banner was a 1965 newspaper, set up as a "strike paper" during a strike against Baltimore newspapers. During a 1984 strike, strikers considered resurrecting it.

== 1965 strike paper ==
While members of the American Newspaper Guild union went on strike against the Baltimore News-American, Baltimore Evening Sun, and Baltimore Sun, as the "Baltimore Banner Co." they published the Baltimore Banner "strike paper" daily from April 30 to May 28.

== 1984 strike consideration ==
Patrick Gilbert, chairman of the Baltimore Sun unit of the Washington-Baltimore Local 35 of the American Newspaper Guild, led some 700 members on strike. The target was A.S. Abell Publishing, owners of the morning Baltimore Sun (circulation 185,510), Evening Sun (circulation 163,672), and Sunday Sun (circulation of 407,436), employing some 1,500 full-time and 700 part-time workers. Guild members took steps to resume the Baltimore Banner strike paper.

== See also ==
- 1962–1963 New York City newspaper strike
