= Wide Angle Youth Media =

Non-profit in Maryland US providing youth media education

Wide Angle Youth Media is located in Baltimore, Maryland. Wide Angle Youth Media is a 501(c)3 non-profit organization that provides Baltimore youth with media education to tell their own stories and become engaged with their communities. Through quality after-school programming, in-school opportunities, summer workshops, community events, and a Traveling Photography Exhibit, Wide Angle supports young people making a difference through media.

== See also ==
- Media in Baltimore
