= Baltimore Beat =

American nonprofit newspaper based in Baltimore

- Type: Alternative weekly
- Editor: Lisa Snowden-McCray
- Founded: 2017
- Headquarters: Baltimore, Maryland
- Website: baltimorebeat.com

Baltimore Beat is an American nonprofit media outlet based in and focused on Baltimore, Maryland.

== History ==
Brandon Soderberg was editor-in-chief of the Baltimore City Paper when Baltimore Sun Media Group announced that it would close the alt weekly. Soderberg made several unsuccessful attempts to save the paper. Eventually, he partnered with publisher, Kevin Naff (of Brown Naff Pitts Omnimedia) to launch a new publication, the Baltimore Beat. Soderberg then recruited former City Paper editor, Lisa Snowden-McCray, to serve as the Beat's editor-in-chief.

Baltimore Beat had initial operating support (accounting, design, and production) from the Washington Blade (which is also published by Naff). In November 2017, two weeks after the final issue of Baltimore City Paper, the first issue of Baltimore Beat was released. The debut cover story was a feature on local activist Erricka Bridgeford, written by Snowden-McCray and photographed by Devin Allen.

Four months after its launch, Baltimore Beat closed due to insufficient advertising revenue. Though he'd initially expressed confidence in their business model, Naff blamed the shortfall on "perception of crime" in Baltimore.

One year after its initial shuttering, Soderberg and Snowden-McCray relaunched the Baltimore Beat as a nonprofit, digital publication focused on "service journalism and high-impact investigative work.". The two founders solicited private donations by setting up a Patreon for the paper. They also received support from the Baltimore Institute for Nonprofit Journalism.

In 2020, the Beat began a two-year pause of publication. When it resumed in August 2022, with both print and digital media, the Beat re-introduced itself as a "Black-led, Black-controlled nonprofit newspaper and media outlet." The publication had received a $1 million donation from the Lillian Holofcener Charitable Foundation, which, by making the donation had effectively emptied its reserves. According to Adam Holofcener, the donation was "an attempt to directly respond to the calls for racial justice after the murder of George Floyd by police in 2020 and an attempt to purge the family of gains it had made, which, as Holofcener sees it, came at the expense of Baltimore’s Black residents."

In describing the difference between Baltimore Beat and more established Baltimore-based newspapers, like the century-old Afro News, Snowden-McCray explained, "We have City Paper in our DNA. So I think that our lane is not at all to try to replace a 100-plus-year-old paper. Our lane is to figure out how to hold government accountable and do the things that we can do, provide deep arts coverage in the way that we can do it. I think Black people deserve a multitude of media outlets. We're just trying to help contribute to that."

Snowden-McCray has remained the Beat's editor-in-chief throughout its history; but leading up to its 2022 relaunch, Soderberg moved into a temporary role, as director of operations, which concluded in September 2022. Baltimore Beat staff also includes Teri Henderson as arts and culture editor.
