= Welter (magazine) =

Literary magazine at the University of Baltimore

- Editor: Rotating
- Categories: Literary
- Frequency: Annual (Fall)
- First issue: 1965
- Country: United States
- Based in: Baltimore
- Language: English
- Website: Welter

Welter is a literary magazine based at the University of Baltimore. The magazine was founded in 1965. It is graduate student run publication with new editorial staff every year. A new print issue is released every spring. Welter has been a University of Baltimore's student run literary for more than 50 years. The magazine accepts international submissions in the genres of poetry, fiction and non-fiction.

A more recent "sibling" magazine, Skelter, is specifically targeted at the goal of running work from students in the UBalt community. Since the creation of its sibling magazine, Welter has become graduate student run.

== See also ==
- List of literary magazines
