= WPOC =

Country music radio station in Baltimore

Coordinates: 39.287°N 76.754°W

- Baltimore, Maryland; United States
- Broadcast area: Baltimore metropolitan area
- Frequency: 93.1 MHz (HD Radio)
- RDS: PI: 1db2; PTY: Country; RT: 93.1 WPOC Title Artist
- Branding: 93.1 WPOC

Programming
- Language: English
- Format: Country music
- Subchannels: HD2: TikTok Radio
- Affiliations: iHeartRadio; Premiere Networks

Ownership
- Owner: iHeartMedia; (iHM Licenses, LLC)
- Sister stations: WCAO; WQSR; WZFT

History
- First air date: February 4, 1960
- Call sign meaning: "Pride of the Chesaspeake"

Technical information
- Licensing authority: FCC
- Facility ID: 47747
- Class: B
- ERP: 16,000 watts (analog); 400 watts (digital)
- HAAT: 264 meters (866 ft)

Links
- Public license information: Public file; LMS
- Webcast: Listen live (via iHeartRadio)
- Website: wpoc.iheart.com

WPOC (93.1 MHz) is a commercial radio station in Baltimore, Maryland. It airs a country music format and is owned by iHeartMedia. The radio studios and offices are 1 W Pennsylvania Ave Suite 200 Towson, MD 21204

The transmitter, with an effective radiated power (ERP) of 16,000 watts, is off North Rolling Road in Catonsville, Maryland. It has a height above average terrain (HAAT) of 264 meters (886 feet), providing WPOC with a wide coverage area from Washington, D.C. to the Maryland-Pennsylvania state line, and from Annapolis to Frederick. It broadcasts using HD Radio technology. Its HD2 digital subchannel carries iHeartRadio's "TikTok Radio" service.

== History ==
On February 4, 1960, the station signed on as WFMM-FM. It was owned by the Commercial Radio Institute (which eventually evolved into Sinclair Broadcast Group) with studios at 44 West Biddle Street. It was a rare stand-alone FM station, not associated with an AM station or a newspaper.

In 1974, the station was acquired by Nationwide Communications, a division of Nationwide Insurance. Nationwide decided to put a country music format on 93.1 on September 2 of that year. The call sign was switched from WFMM-FM to WPOC, standing for "Pride of the Chesaspeake", because the station covers much of Chesapeake Bay. The station affiliated with the ABC Directions Network for national news.

In 1999, the station was acquired by Clear Channel Communications, which maintained the country music format. Clear Channel later became iHeartMedia, the current owner. Until at 2022 the studios were on the second floor of The Rotunda Shopping Center, on West 40th Street, in Baltimore.

== Airstaff and honors ==
WPOC is one of the format’s most consistently successful stations according to Country Aircheck. The station had seen "49 total No. 1 books and an unparalleled 104 years worth of combined tenure among its airstaff" as of 2024.

The station's on-air line up as of January 2026 consists of Michael J. (since 2000) in morning drive, Bob Delmont (since 1999) handles middays. Since November 2025 Ty Bailey voice tracks afternoon drive sister station WMZQ.

Premiere Networks' syndicated The Bobby Bones Show is carried in the evening and Granger Smith's syndicated show is heard overnight.

Weekends consist of local voice tracking and syndicated programing, such as "Country House Party" and "Women of iHeart Country" as well as local specialty programing such as "Maryland Today", a public affairs show.

From 1988-2024, the station was home to "The Laurie DeYoung Morning Show." Host Laurie DeYoung was the first female to lead a major market Country morning show. For the majority of the show's run she was joined by three co-hosts who also respectively handled traffic, news and weather. DeYoung is two-time CMA Personality of the Year (1994 and 2014) and was inducted into the Country Music DJ Hall of Fame in 2010. She was the longest-running Country morning show talent in a major market when the show concluded in December 2024.

In 2025, Laurie hosted a special one-hour show Sunday mornings titled "Sunday Brunch with Laurie" in which she played an hour of music centered around a specific theme that changed week to week. She hosted her last show December 22, 2025, marking the end of a 40-year career at WPOC. She holds the record as the longest tenured radio talent at a single station in Baltimore radio.

== Past personalities ==
- Laurie DeYoung (1985-2025)
- Marty Bass (Weather/The Laurie DeYoung Morning Show 1987-2012)
- Mark Williams (Traffic/The Laurie DeYoung Morning Show 1997-2017)
- Bill "Aaron" Rehkof (News Director 1999-2007) (Later at KDKA Pittsburgh)
- Bill Vanko (News 1984-1999) (Later at WBAL)
- Mary Street- (News Director 1977-1993)
- Pat Nason
- Mike Fast
- Lee Dennis
- Gail Svenson
- Ted Patterson
- Fran Severn
- Jen Phoenix (1998-2007)
- Jerry Houston (1998-2010)
- Justin Cole (2008-2013)
- Diane Lyn (Later at WLIF Today's 101.9 Baltimore)
- Trish Hennessey
- Libby Cole
- Jeff Michaels
- Carol Mason
- Tom Conroy
- Bob Raleigh (formerly WPGC)
- Todd Grimsted (afternoon drive 1980-1999)
- Scott Lawrence
- Danny Reese
- Brenda Bissett
- Greg Cole
- Jim Conway
- Ken Boesen
- Scott Lindy (
- Doug Wilson
- Bob Moody
- Larry Clark
- Tony Girard
- Mark Joseph
- Bob Mathers
- Jeff St. Pierre (News Director 2008-2025, PM Drive 2025)
- Bethany Linderman (Traffic/The Laurie DeYoung Morning Show 2023-2024, Co-host Michael J & Bethany 2025)
