= Upton (Baltimore, Maryland) =

Historic house in Maryland, United States

- U.S. National Register of Historic Places
- Baltimore City Landmark
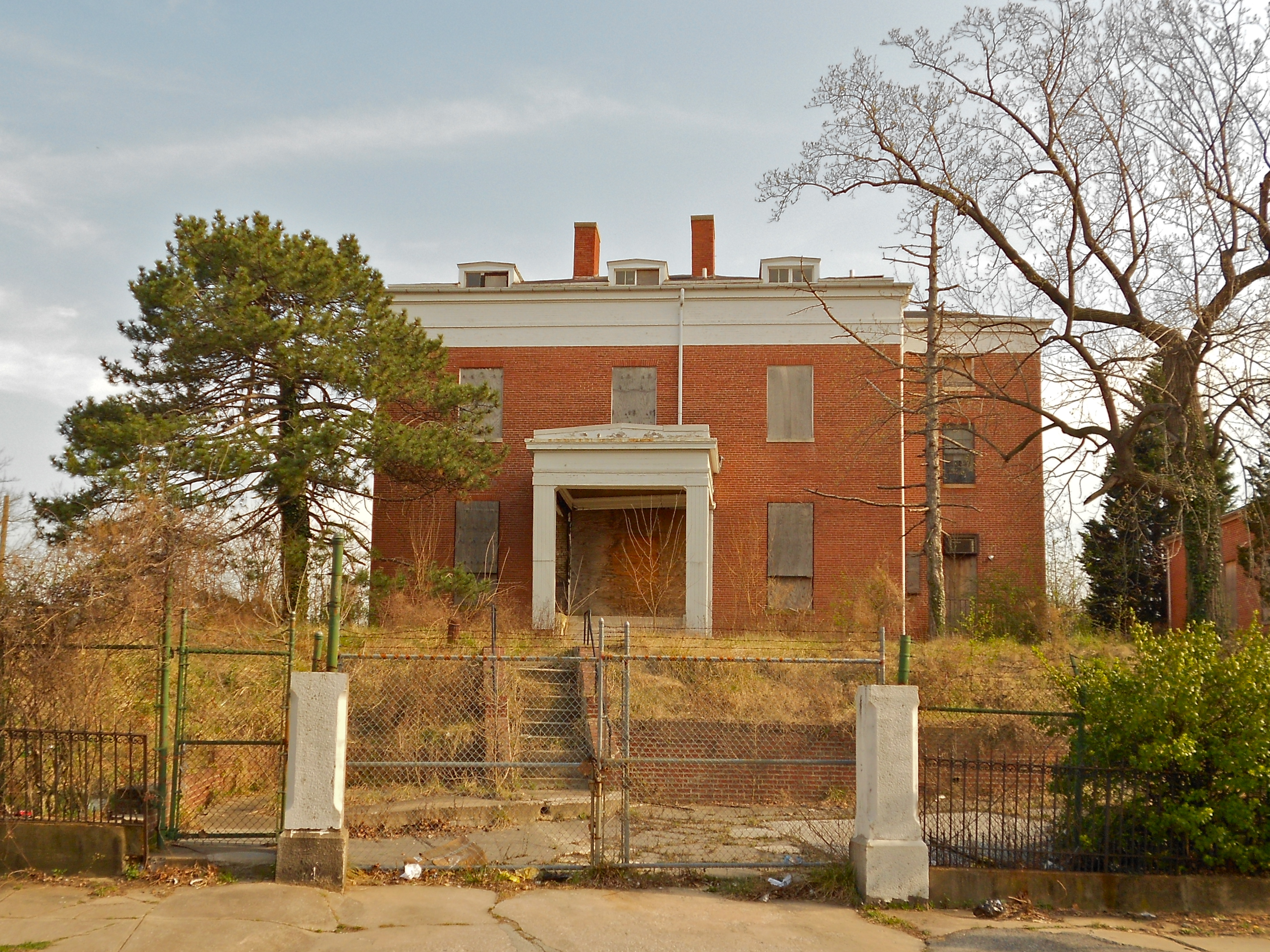
- Upton, March 2012
- Interactive map of Upton
- Location: 811 W. Lanvale St., Baltimore, Maryland
- Coordinates: 39°17′53.016″N 76°37′58.836″W
- Area: less than one acre
- Built: 1838
- Architectural style: Greek Revival
- NRHP reference No.: 94000764

Significant dates
- Added to NRHP: July 27, 1994
- Designated BCL: 2008

Upton, also known as the David Stewart Residence or Dammann Mansion, is a historic home located in the Upton neighborhood of Baltimore, Maryland, United States. It is a large brick Greek Revival mansion constructed about 1838 as the country residence of David Stewart (1800-1858), a prominent Baltimore attorney and politician. It is 2 1/2 stories high on a raised basement, three bays wide and two rooms deep, with a center-passage plan. In the late 1950s, a brick stair tower was constructed when the building was adapted for public school use. After many years as a school for exceptional children, in 1977 the Upton Mansion housed the offices for the Home and Hospital Services (school #303) of the Baltimore City Public Schools and continued through 2006. In February 2023, a $2.2 million federal grant was announced to help create renovate the property into the headquarters of the Afro-American, an African-American newspaper published in Baltimore since 1892. Afro Charities is the awardee of the grant which will also help to digitize thousands of images and copies of the newspaper.

Upton was listed on the National Register of Historic Places in 1994. Upton is included in the Baltimore National Heritage Area.
