= WZFT =

Contemporary hit radio station in Baltimore

Coordinates: 39.336°N 76.649°W

- Baltimore, Maryland; United States
- Broadcast area: Baltimore metropolitan area
- Frequency: 104.3 MHz (HD Radio)
- Branding: Z104.3

Programming
- Language: English
- Format: Gold-based CHR
- Subchannels: HD2: Pride Radio; (dance radio)
- Affiliations: Premiere Networks

Ownership
- Owner: iHeartMedia; (iHM Licenses, LLC)
- Sister stations: WCAO, WPOC, WQSR

History
- First air date: June 27, 1946
- Former call signs: WITH-FM (1946–1974); WDJQ (1974–1978); WITH-FM (1978–1980); WBSB (1980–1993); WVRT (1993–1994); WSSF (1994); WOCT (1994–2002); WXFB (2002–2003); WSMJ (2003–2008); WCHH (2008–2009)
- Former frequencies: 102.5 MHz (1946–1947)

Technical information
- Licensing authority: FCC
- Facility ID: 8684
- Class: B
- ERP: 13,000 watts
- HAAT: 294 meters (965 ft)

Links
- Public license information: Public file; LMS
- Webcast: Listen live (via iHeartRadio)
- Website: z1043.iheart.com

WZFT (104.3 FM), branded "Z104.3", is a Gold-based CHR radio station located in Baltimore, Maryland. It is currently owned and operated by iHeartMedia. WZFT's studios are located at The Rotunda shopping center in Baltimore, and its transmitter is based atop Television Hill in the city's Woodberry district.

== History ==
=== WITH-FM and DJ-104 ===
The station signed on in 1949, as WITH-FM, the FM sister station to WITH (1230 AM, now WFOA).

On October 1, 1974, WITH-FM became contemporary hit radio WDJQ-FM "DJ-104". By the late 1970s, WDJQ-FM made an attempt to do an all-disco format, which failed in the ratings, and the station went back to top 40 at the end of 1979.

=== B-104 ===
In June 1980, Scripps-Howard Broadcasting acquired WDJQ-FM, and at noon on July 2, 104.3 FM became WBSB under the branding "B-104", but retaining the previous top 40 format.

=== Variety 104.3 and Soft 104.3 ===
By 1991, the top 40 format suffered a decline in audience and revenue due to the rise of alternative rock and hip hop. Many stations around the country flipped to other formats; WBSB was one of those. On February 18, 1992, at 9:00 am, after playing a montage of station memories, the station flipped to hot AC "Variety 104.3". The first song on "Variety" was "Listen to the Music" by The Doobie Brothers. In January 1993, the station changed its call letters to WVRT. The station suffered from low ratings during this time. Capitol Broadcasting, the owners of WWMX, acquired the station from E. W. Scripps in the fall of 1993. On December 13, the station began stunting with a simulcast of WWMX. At midnight on December 20, the stunting switched to a loop of only five songs (with those songs being replaced each week), as well as liners redirecting listeners to WWMX. Finally, on January 12, 1994, at 6 pm, the station flipped to soft AC "Soft 104.3" WSSF. Capitol sold the station to American Radio Systems in 1994.

=== 104.3 The Colt and 104.3-OCT ===
After just 9 months of "Soft", on October 14, 1994, at 3 pm, the station flipped to 1970s-based classic hits as "104.3 The Colt", using the call letters WOCT. The station later evolved into a classic rock format. In 1998, American Radio Systems merged with CBS Radio/Infinity Broadcasting. The company was forced to sell one station due to being over the ownership limitations of 5 FM stations in a market. As a result, WOCT was sold to Jacor Communications, which would merge with the station's current owner iHeartMedia (then known as Clear Channel Communications) a year later. Following the sale, the station changed its format again, this time to a harder classic rock format as "104.3-OCT".

=== Baltimore 104.3 and B-104.3 ===
In 2001, the station returned to mainstream classic rock as "Baltimore 104.3", and then a year later briefly brought back the heritage "B-104" name as WXFB ("B-104.3").

=== Smooth Jazz 104.3 and Channel 104.3 ===
On September 5, 2003, at 10 am, the station flipped to smooth jazz as WSMJ.

On May 23, 2008, at 9 am, after playing "Neither One of Us (Wants to Be the First to Say Goodbye)" by Gladys Knight & the Pips, the station began stunting with Christmas music. At noon that same day, the station launched into a 1990s-intensive modern rock format as Channel 104.3. The first (and ultimately, last) song on "Channel" was "No Way Back" by The Foo Fighters. On May 29, 2008, the station changed its call letters to WCHH.

In January 2009, the station's transmitter was moved from northeast of the city to Television Hill near downtown, with hopes of improving signal coverage in the Howard County and Anne Arundel County suburbs.

=== Z104.3 ===
At 10 am on November 4, 2009, the station briefly stunted again, this time with R&B music as "Charm 104.3" (Mario Winans's "I Don't Wanna Know" was the first song played as part of the stunt), before officially flipping to contemporary hit radio at noon (the last song played as part of the stunt was Ja Rule & Ashanti's "Always on Time") as "Z104.3". The first song played on "Z" was "3" by Britney Spears. The station changed calls to WZFT on November 20, 2009. On July 1, 2014, WZFT updated its logo, mirroring a logo similar to sister station WHTZ in New York.

== HD Radio ==
On June 26, 2019, WZFT-HD2 flipped to iHeart's "Pride Radio" format of top 40/dance music targeting the LGBTQ community. Previously, the HD2 subchannel carried hip-hop music as "The Beat", urban adult contemporary music from iHeart's "All My Jams" channel, and alternative rock as "Alt 104.3".
