= Where What When =

Monthly Jewish newspaper

Where What When: Baltimore's Jewish Family Magazine
- Type: Monthly magazine
- Founded: 1985
- Headquarters: Baltimore, Maryland
- Circulation: 40,000
- OCLC number: 35079561
- Website: wherewhatwhen.com

Where What When is a monthly Jewish periodical in the Baltimore, Maryland area. Established in 1985, its content is directed to the wide spectrum of Baltimore's Jewish population, and it has an approximate readership of 40,000.

The magazine is circulated by mail and by newsstand throughout Maryland and Washington D.C. including, Baltimore, Silver Spring and Rockville. Articles cover topics such as Jewish schools, Israel, advice, stories, kosher recipes, Baltimore politics, Jewish singles and Jewish holidays.

It maintains a website with an archive of all the articles published since September 2005.
