= Baltimore City Paper =

Weekly newspaper published in Baltimore, Maryland

City Paper
- June 23, 2010 cover of the City Paper
- Type: Alternative weekly
- Format: Tabloid
- Owner(s): Baltimore Sun Media Group (Tribune Publishing)
- Publisher: Trif Alatzas
- Editor: Brandon Soderberg
- Founded: 1977
- Ceased publication: 2017
- Headquarters: 501 North Calvert Street; Baltimore, MD 21278; United States
- Circulation: 52,000 (as of May 2016)
- ISSN: 0740-3410
- Website: citypaper.com

Baltimore City Paper was a free alternative weekly newspaper published in Baltimore, Maryland, United States, founded in 1977 by Russ Smith and Alan Hirsch. The most recent owner was the Baltimore Sun Media Group, which purchased the paper in 2014 from Times-Shamrock Communications, which had owned the newspaper since 1987. It was distributed on Wednesdays in distinctive yellow boxes found throughout the Baltimore area. The paper folded in 2017, due to the collapse of advertising revenue income to print media. The Media Group's closure announcement happened at the same meeting immediately after recognizing City Paper staff joining the Washington-Baltimore News Guild.

== History ==
Russ Smith and Alan Hirsch started the Baltimore City Paper in May 1977 while students at Johns Hopkins University. It was originally named the City Squeeze, and Smith and Hirsch published it using the offices of the Johns Hopkins student newspaper. In 1978, they took the paper out of the university and started publishing it as the Baltimore City Paper. Smith said that he viewed the paper as an alternative weekly similar to the Chicago Reader and the Boston Real Paper. The paper was free, except for a time between 1979 and 1981, where they charged 25¢ per issue. Charging a fee turned out to be mistake, as most of the paper's income came through advertising revenue and the fee led to a precipitous drop in circulation, and consequently advertising revenues.

It was best known for providing information on clubs, concerts, theater, and restaurants, but each issue also has one major article on a subject not usually being carried by the mainstream media. In each issue there are also several political and advice columns and numerous cartoons including the weekly comic Dirtfarm by Ben Claassen III.

The last issue was released on November 1, 2017. The Baltimore Beat started after.

== Notable stories ==
The City Paper broke several important stories in the Baltimore area, including a plagiarism scandal involving longtime Baltimore Sun columnist Michael Olesker. It also presented the Best of Baltimore awards every year, in which various local businesses, attractions, and aspects of Baltimore, Maryland were highlighted.

In the summer of 2013, Times-Shamrock Communications announced its intention to sell off all of its alternative newspapers outside Pennsylvania, including the City Paper. In February 2014, the Baltimore Sun Media Group announced it had reached an agreement to purchase the Baltimore City Paper, with the sale to close in March 2014.

== Notable writers ==
- J. D. Considine (1977–1980)
- Peter Koper (1979–1980)
- Franz Lidz (1978–1979)
- John Strausbaugh (1979–1990)
