= WWIN (AM) =

Coordinates: 39°18′06″N 76°34′09″W

- Baltimore, Maryland; United States
- Broadcast area: Baltimore metropolitan area
- Frequency: 1400 kHz
- Branding: Baltimore's BIN 1400 AM

Programming
- Language: English
- Format: All-news radio
- Affiliations: Black Information Network

Ownership
- Owner: Urban One; (Radio One Licenses, LLC)
- Operator: iHeartMedia
- Sister stations: WERQ-FM, WOLB, WWIN-FM

History
- First air date: 1951; 75 years ago

Technical information
- Licensing authority: FCC
- Facility ID: 54709
- Class: C
- Power: 500 watts
- Repeater: 92.3 WERQ-HD2 (Baltimore)

Links
- Public license information: Public file; LMS
- Webcast: Listen live (via iHeartRadio)
- Website: baltimore.binnews.com

WWIN (1400 kHz) is a commercial AM radio station in Baltimore, Maryland. Owned by Urban One and operated by iHeartMedia, it broadcasts an all-news radio format. The studios are in Woodlawn, shared with sister stations WERQ-FM, WOLB and WWIN-FM.

WWIN is powered at 500 watts. The transmitter is on East Monument Street in the Orangeville section of East Baltimore.

== History ==
WWIN first signed on in 1951. For most of its history, it has been programmed for Baltimore's African-American community. Originally it played R&B and soul music, with some urban gospel in early mornings and on Sunday. In later years, as most listeners switched to FM for contemporary music, WWIN switched to urban gospel full time.

Logo as "Spirit", used from 2005 to 2026

On June 17, 2026, WWIN began airing iHeartMedia's all-news Black Information Network, replacing WQLL (1370 AM) as the network's Baltimore affiliate. The two stations briefly simulcast BIN through September. Of Baltimore's three gospel stations, WWIN did not register in the May 2026 Nielsen ratings, while iHeartMedia's "Heaven 600" WCAO had a 0.4 share and Urban One's "Praise 106.1" W291BA had a 0.5 share.
