= Paint and sip =

Type of company

The paint and sip industry is a set of experience-based businesses that hire professional artists to provide step-by-step instructions to reproduce a pre-selected work of art while they drink wine or other beverages. When class attendees finish, they get to keep their creations.

These classes typically focus on painting as a fun activity for relieving stress, rather than as a technical skill requiring practice like the classes at an atelier or an art school. Alcohol is used to reduce inhibitions and "overthinking" in order to make the creative process feel easier.

== Business model ==
Paint and sip studios are mostly franchises; the industry has steadily increased in popularity since 2012.

The popularity of paint and sip companies among potential franchise owners is commonly attributed to the drive of professionals with marketing or business experience to "get out of Corporate America". Furthermore, the "party atmosphere" of paint and sip businesses, as well as the lack of a requirement to be "artistically savvy", are seen as draws for professionals with no background in the arts who want to make a career change.

The typical paint and sip business offers group painting classes that last for two to three hours. Customers are encouraged to bring their own beverages (BYOB), or purchase them if the studio has a liquor license.

The classes are heavily marketed to women as a "girls' night out" experience.

== History ==
=== Sips 'N Strokes ===
Founded in 2002 by Wendy Lovoy near Birmingham, Alabama, Sips 'N Strokes began offering painting classes for both children and adults. The studio was among the first to adopt a bring-your-own-beverage (BYOB) format for adult painting classes, aiming to create a more relaxed and social atmosphere for participants.

=== Painting with a Twist ===
Painting with a Twist was established in 2007 by Cathy Deano and Renee Maloney in Mandeville, Louisiana. The company expanded its presence in the industry through several acquisitions, including Bottle & Bottega in 2018 and Color Me Mine, a paint-your-own-pottery franchise, in 2020. That same year, it also acquired Chesapeake Ceramics, a supplier of ceramic materials. These acquisitions led to the formation of Twist Brands, the parent company of the merged businesses. As of 2015, the estimated initial investment required to open a Painting with a Twist franchise was approximately $100,000.

== Challenges in the industry ==
Because the format of paint-and-sip classes depends on how new the experience is, it can be hard for businesses in this field to get customers to come back. To address this challenge, many businesses plan themed events, including holiday, pet portrait painting sessions, nudist male model nights for bachelorette parties and singles nights, and erotic nights for couples.

As for many other public gathering spaces, paint and sip companies faced waning interest and significant financial challenges due to the COVID-19 pandemic. By November 2020, the number of Painting with a Twist franchises decreased from 350 to below 300 due to rolling economic shutdowns. Because of this, many of these businesses also hold online "paint and sip parties".
