= The Rotunda (Baltimore) =

Coordinates: 39.3362°N 76.6305°W

- Location: Baltimore, Maryland, United States
- Address: 711 W. 40th Street
- Opened: 1971; 55 years ago
- Developer: Hekemian & Co.
- Manager: MCB Real Estate
- Owner: MCB Real Estate
- Num. of stores: 10
- Num. of anchor tenants: 2
- Floor area: 300,000 sq. ft.
- Floors: 1 (Offices on levels 2-4)
- Parking: 1100 off street spaces
- Public transit: MTA Maryland bus: 22, 95
- Website: http://www.rotundabaltimore.com/

The Rotunda is a mixed-use property in northern Baltimore, Maryland in the neighborhood of Hampden, adjacent to the neighborhoods of Roland Park, and Wyman Park and near the campus of the Johns Hopkins University. The property features retail, office, and residential components including: 150,000 ft² of retail space, 140,000 ft² of office space, 379 apartments and over 1100 off-street parking spaces, including a multi-level parking garage featuring several electric car charging stations.

== Office space ==
Office tenants at The Rotunda include the Space Telescope Science Institute, lawyers, dentists, sports physicians, a dyslexia tutoring program, mental health professionals and various other specialists.

== History ==
The mall was originally developed by Bernard Manekin who converted the 1921 Maryland Casualty Insurance Co. building, designed by Otto Simonson, into a shopping center in 1971. The historic building's centerpiece is a bell tower which chimes the Westminster Quarters. It was renovated in 2002, and again in 2014 by Hekemian & Co. The mall was bought by Hekemian & Co., Inc. in the early 2000s. Hekemian & Co has since completed its $100 million redevelopment of the site, which includes the 379 unit ICON residences at The Rotunda, shops and restaurants, and a Mom's Organic Market.

The Rotunda was the home to a cinema, "The Rotunda Cinematheque", until July 2015.

== Current businesses ==
In 2019, plans were made for a Rita's Italian Ice location to open in one of the commercial spaces in the courtyard of the south side of the Rotunda, which opened in 2021.
