= WTOP =

WTOP may refer to:

== Radio stations ==
- WTOP-FM 103.5 FM, a radio station in Washington, D.C.
- WHUR-FM 96.3 FM, a radio station licensed to Washington, D.C. that held the WTOP-FM call letters from 1949 until 1971
- WFED 1500 AM, a radio station licensed to Washington, D.C. that held the WTOP call letters from 1943 until 2006
- WSHE (AM) 820 AM, a radio station licensed to Frederick, Maryland that held the WTOP call letters from 2006 until 2007
- WBQH 1050 AM, a radio station licensed to Silver Spring, Maryland, United States that held the call sign WTOP during 2010
- A three-station network simulcasting WTOP (the current WFED) from 1997 until 2005, see WTOP-FM

== Television stations ==
- WUSA (TV), the CBS television affiliate for Washington, D.C. that held the WTOP-TV call letters from 1950 until 1978

== Organisations ==
- Wiltshire Traditional Orchards Project, an organisation that maps, conserves and restores traditional orchards within Wiltshire, United Kingdom
