= WSHE (AM) =

Radio station in Frederick, Maryland

- Frederick, Maryland; United States
- Broadcast area: Central Maryland
- Frequency: 820 kHz (HD Radio) (digital only)
- Branding: The Gamut

Programming
- Format: Freeform; Federal News Network sports programming
- Affiliations: Navy Midshipmen; Premiere Networks; Washington Capitals; Washington Nationals

Ownership
- Owner: Hubbard Broadcasting; (Washington DC FCC License Sub, LLC)
- Sister stations: WTOP-FM; WTLP; WWWT-FM; WHFS; WFED

History
- First air date: December 15, 1960
- Former call signs: WMHI (1960–1975); WZYQ (1975–1988); WQSI (1988–1996); WXTR (1996–2006); WTOP (2006–2007); WTWT (2007); WWWB (2007–2008); WWFD (2008-2024)
- Former frequencies: 1370 kHz (1960–1987)
- Call sign meaning: call sign moved from WTBC-FM in Chicago

Technical information
- Licensing authority: FCC
- Facility ID: 47104
- Class: B
- Power: 4,300 watts (day); 430 watts (night)
- Transmitter coordinates: 39°24′42.37″N 77°28′1.0″W
- Translator: WTOP-FM HD3: 98.3 W252DC (Reston, Virginia)
- Repeaters: 1050 WHFS (Silver Spring); 103.5 WTOP-FM HD3 (Washington, D.C.); 103.9 WTLP-HD3 (Braddock Heights); 107.7 WWWT-FM HD3 (Manassas, Virginia)

Links
- Public license information: Public file; LMS
- Webcast: Listen live
- Website: thegamut.fm

WSHE (820 kHz HD Radio) is a commercial radio station, which transmits a digital-only signal on a standard AM band frequency. It is licensed to serve Frederick, Maryland, and owned by Hubbard Broadcasting through licensee Washington DC FCC License Sub, LLC. It simulcasts the freeform programming branded as The Gamut originating on the HD3 subchannel of sister station WTOP-FM. The Gamut programming is also available on the HD3 subchannels of sister stations WTLP and WWWT-FM, and in analog FM on translator W252DC (98.3 FM, Reston, Virginia).

Sunday syndicated programming on The Gamut includes Music and the Spoken Word (with WFED), Anything Anything with Rich Russo and Little Steven's Underground Garage.

As WWFD, it was the first licensed radio station in the United States to discontinue its traditional AM analog signal and operate solely in digital-only HD Radio MA3 mode, which it began under experimental authorization from the Federal Communications Commission (FCC) in 2018. WWFD's experiments with digital-only operation led to the FCC authorizing it on a voluntary basis for AM band stations nationwide in 2020.

== History ==
This station signed on in May 1961 as daytimer WMHI on 1370 AM. From 1975 through 1988, WZYQ was contemporary hit radio (CHR) station "14ZYQ", transitioning to "Z104" during that era, with a brand emphasizing its simulcast on WZYQ-FM 103.9. The station received permission to add nighttime operation and move to 820 AM in 1986. Two years later, 820 AM split from the simulcast, becoming country "The Big Q" WQSI with Frederick Keys baseball. The FM station dropped the "-FM" suffix from its call sign (becoming WZYQ) and continued with CHR. Both stations were purchased by Liberty Broadcasting, the owner of oldies station WXTR-FM 104.1 in Waldorf, Maryland, in 1995. Liberty's interest was in pairing WZYQ with WXTR, as WXTR's signal did not cover the northwestern Washington metropolitan area. All three stations were sold to Bonneville International the following year, who revived the "Z104" brand on the FM pair and built a successful CHR outlet focused on the Washington market.

Although the call sign WXTR moved over from 104.1 FM, Bonneville continued with country music on 820 AM. As with 103.9 FM, starting in 2000, Bonneville used 820 AM to bolster the coverage of one of their Washington-market stations to the northwest. Local programming ended on WXTR when it began simulcasting WTOP (1500 AM) on December 18. The WTOP call sign was "parked" on the station when it was moved off of its historical home at 1500 AM on January 11, 2006. On March 30, 2006, the station joined Washington Post Radio, continuing with its successor Talk Radio 3WT (under the call signs WTWT and WWWB, respectively) until the network was shut down on September 15, 2008. The station then became a simulcast of Federal News Radio, taking the call sign WWFD to match. Bonneville sold its entire Washington cluster to Hubbard Broadcasting in 2011.

The Gamut began as an eclectic hobby Internet radio station run by WTOP-FM engineer Dave Kolesar. WTOP management took an interest in the project, and after retooling the music and coming up with the name The Gamut, it began broadcasting on the HD3 subchannel of WTOP-FM on December 5, 2011. WWFD was the first analog home of the format, beginning its simulcast on March 20, 2013. The Gamut later added a translator on 104.3 (W282BA) in Leesburg, Virginia, that was previously used to repeat the main signal of WTOP-FM. This translator was given a power boost, becoming W283CD at 104.5, and relocated to Sterling in 2015. In February 2016, independently owned translator W252DC signed on from Great Falls, Virginia, on 98.3.

W283CD has since been reassigned to WBQH, which temporarily left W252DC as the sole analog FM signal. W252DC moved to Arlington, Virginia, then Reston, Virginia, to cover the city of Washington. This translator relays The Gamut via a simulcast of WTOP-FM-HD3.

Hubbard signed on FM translator W232DG (94.3) in Frederick on July 11, 2017. The translator was moved under the FCC's AM revitalization rules and was required to rebroadcast the 820 AM signal for at least four years, including when it joined WFED for sports coverage.

On June 30, 2018, Hubbard applied for experimental authorization to convert to all-digital HD Radio broadcasts for one year. Although WWFD was by far The Gamut's largest analog signal, Kolesar stated that growing The Gamut's audience through analog AM was not viable. Previous experimental all-digital signals had a larger listenable coverage area than analog or an in-band on-channel hybrid digital signal, although this was the first long-term experiment. The station continued to feed translator W232DG to preserve analog coverage to Frederick, its city of license. WWFD shut off its analog signal at noon on July 16.

Hubbard and Xperi, the current developer of HD Radio, have used WWFD to test new features and operating modes; it notably experimented with a multiplexed signal, the first of its kind for an AM station in North America, in December 2019. The FCC subsequently approved voluntary all-digital AM operation nationwide on October 27, 2020. After several yearly extensions of its digital authorization to continue testing with Xperi, Hubbard filed to take WWFD permanently all-digital effective August 10, 2023. Translator W232DG was sold to Manning Broadcasting to relay WWEG-HD2 the following month, with digital experimentation having been completed and the translator's legal requirement to rebroadcast WWFD having expired in 2021. According to Kolesar, the "vast majority" of The Gamut's listenership in Frederick was already on the digital signal.

On June 6, 2024, Hubbard changed WWFD's call sign to WSHE; this change was concurrent with Chicago sister station WSHE-FM becoming WTBC-FM.

== Translator ==
Call sign	Frequency	City of license	FID	ERP (W)	HAAT	Class	Transmitter coordinates	FCC info	Notes
W252DC	98.3 FM	Reston, Virginia	138737	150	79 m (259 ft)	D	38°53′45.4″N 77°08′6.9″W	LMS	Owned by Reston Translator, LLC
