= WGYS =

WGYS may refer to:

- WGYS (FM), a radio station (91.9 FM) licensed to serve Rumford, Maine, United States
- WGYS-LP, a defunct low-power radio station (102.3 FM) licensed to serve Dixfield, Maine, United States
- WTLP, a radio station (103.9 FM) licensed to serve Braddock Heights, Maryland, United States, which held the call sign WGYS from 2006 to 2007
