= Jim Bohannon =

American talk radio host (1944–2022)

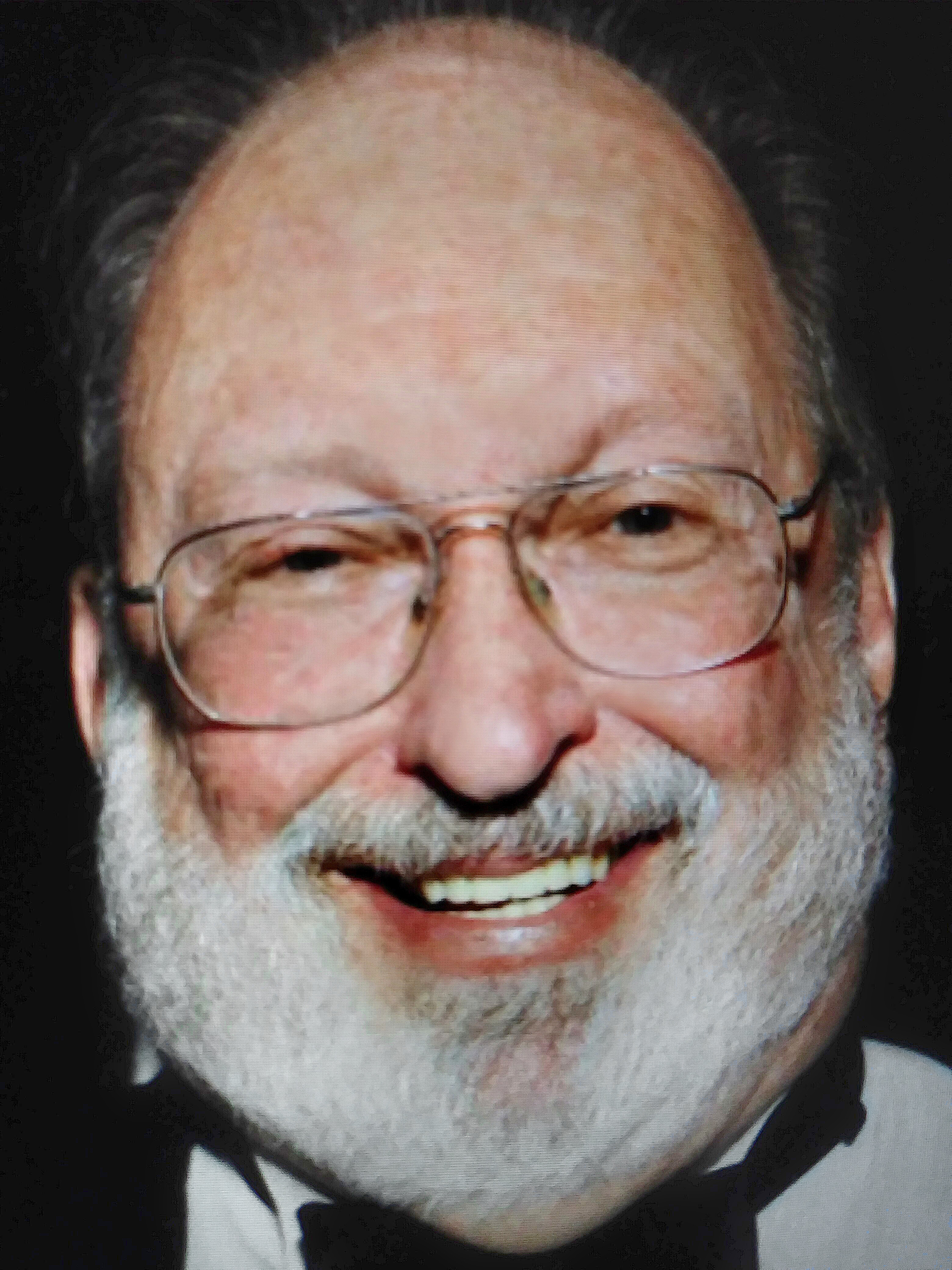
- Bohannon in 2021
- Born: James Everett Bohannon; January 7, 1944; Corvallis, Oregon, U.S.
- Died: November 12, 2022 (aged 78); Seneca, South Carolina, U.S.
- Education: Southwest Missouri State College
- Occupations: Journalist; Radio broadcaster
- Years active: 1960–2022
- Spouses: Camille Bohannon (m. 1970, divorced); Annabelle (m. 1998)

James Everett Bohannon (January 7, 1944 – November 12, 2022) was an American broadcaster who worked in television and radio and hosted the nationally syndicated late night radio talk show The Jim Bohannon Show originally broadcast on the Mutual Broadcasting System and later the Westwood One Network from 1985 to 2022. For 31 years, he also hosted America in The Morning, a nationally syndicated radio news show, stepping down in December 2015.

Bohannon was included numerous times in Talkers magazine's annual "Heavy 100" picks of "The 100 Most Important Radio Talk Show Hosts in America". He was inducted into the National Radio Hall of Fame in 2003, and in 2013 was the recipient of Talkers Lifetime Achievement Award. He was also nominated for the Marconi Award for Network Syndicated Personality of the Year presented by the National Association of Broadcasters. In December 2021, Bohannon was announced as an inductee into the NAB's Broadcasting Hall of Fame.

== Early life and education ==
Bohannon was born in Corvallis, Oregon, and raised in Lebanon, Missouri. His broadcasting career began KLWT in his hometown of Lebanon, Missouri, in 1960, where he worked for a dollar per hour. Following his graduation from Lebanon High School in 1962, Bohannon attended Southwest Missouri State University, now known as Missouri State University, in Springfield. While in college he continued to work in radio part-time at KWTO as a news reporter, and at KICK as a disc jockey. One event in 1964 helped set the tone for Bohannon's later career and ability to think on his feet. Presidential candidate Senator Barry Goldwater made a campaign appearance in Springfield, which KWTO was covering by live remote broadcast. However the Senator was running late, forcing the young Bohannon to ad lib on air for over an hour to fill the time. As he told Inside Radio in a 2003 interview: "I called on everything I had in reserve. I was ad libbing and making comments about the campaign. It was like being dumped in the middle of the English Channel and told you needed to learn how to swim. That sticks out as a time I was given a big test." Another highlight for Bohannon while working in radio in those early years was taking three busloads of fans from Springfield to Kansas City, Missouri, to see The Beatles in concert.

== Career ==
=== Military service ===
After his graduation from Southwest Missouri State (now Missouri State University) in 1966, Bohannon enlisted in the United States Army, serving until 1970. Assigned to the Army Security Agency (ASA), his four years of service included a tour of duty (April 1967 to April 1968) during the Vietnam War with the 199th Infantry Brigade. During the Tet Offensive in early 1968, Bohannon was at Long Binh serving with the 303rd ASA Battalion as part of the II Field Force headquarters. After completion of his Vietnam tour Bohannon was assigned to the Washington D.C. area until discharged in 1970.

=== Broadcasting ===
After his discharge from the U.S. Army, Bohannon remained in Washington D.C. where he worked in a series of radio jobs throughout the 1970s. They included stints at news stations WTOP and WRC as well as easy listening station WGAY. In 1980, he returned closer to his Midwestern roots as he took a job at WCFL, Chicago. While doing morning drive at WCFL he also landed a second job in the afternoons as a Chicago bureau reporter for the young upstart CNN. Beginning in 1981, through the Mutual Broadcasting System's ownership of WCFL, Bohannon became the primary guest host on The Larry King Show. Bohannon rapidly gained his own audience as King's fill-in and in 1984, Mutual gave him his own Saturday late night call-in program with the format identical to King's show. In 1993, The Larry King Show moved to afternoons for its final year and Mutual gave King's former overnight time slot to Bohannon.

The Jim Bohannon Show moved to Larry King's former late evening/overnight time slot on January 29, 1993, one day short of the fifteenth anniversary of King's 1978 debut on Mutual. Like King's late night program, Bohannon's show was an immediate ratings success. Broadcasting from Washington, D.C., WFED (as successor to the now-defunct Washington Post Radio) was his flagship station, with over 350 affiliates nationwide. Bohannon's political views, as stated on air, lean toward being moderate and/or slightly conservative, something he called being a "militant moderate". In 2003, he stated that:

Our political system gives the extremes too much of a say-so. We're very often given the choice between an off-the-wall, right wing whacko or some left-wing idiot. The result is that the sensible center — where things actually get done in this country — winds up having to choose from the 'evil of two lessers.'

— Jim Bohannon,

Bohannon has stated that he was a registered Democrat for the purposes of voting in primary elections. The show aired Monday through Friday from 10:00 PM to 1:00 AM Eastern Time (02:00 to 05:00 UTC during daylight saving time, 03:00 to 06:00 UTC during standard time). Each segment of the show featured guests for interviews and calls from listeners. His show usually dealt with politics and popular culture. When Bohannon was away, guest hosts have historically varied in nature and political views greatly; past substitute hosts include conservative talk host and comedian Dennis Miller, liberal television commentator and talk-radio host Leslie Marshall, and the late comedian Joan Rivers.

Bohannon also hosted America in The Morning, a nationally syndicated radio news show, from its inception in 1984 through December 2015, and a daily Westwood One radio feature called The Offbeat, which aired as a part of both The Jim Bohannon Show (as its final segment) and America in The Morning (near the end of the first half-hour). On December 18, 2015, Bohannon stepped down from America in the Morning, after hosting the show for 31 years. Westwood One has appointed radio newsman John Trout to continue the one-hour show, broadcast weekdays at 5 a.m. Eastern Time. Bohannon's other broadcasting industry work included occasionally serving as a booth announcer for CBS-TV's Face the Nation. He has also done voice announcements for the satellite feeds of some other Westwood One radio programs. Bohannon was the originator and driving force behind the National Freedom of Information Day. First submitted by Bohannon to the Society of Professional Journalists in 1979, the event is celebrated each March 16 to honor the birthday of President James Madison, father of the Bill of Rights.

During the summer of 2022, Bohannon was off the air due to unnamed health reasons. On October 10, 2022, Bohannon announced his retirement from the Jim Bohannon Show. His final broadcast was four days later, on October 14, 2022, during which he revealed that he had been diagnosed with stage 4 terminal cancer. His talk show resumed broadcasts the following Monday with Rich Valdés as host, airing as The Jim Bohannon Show with Rich Valdés until January 2023, when it was renamed Rich Valdés America at Night. Valdés left the show in November 2025 and was succeeded by McGraw Milhaven.

== Personal life ==
Jim married his first wife, Mary Camille Skora (who generally went by "Camille"), in late 1970. In 1976 the two began hosting the morning program at Washington, D.C.'s WTOP radio. However, the station owner did not want the show to be labeled as a "husband and wife team", so Camille had to adopt the pseudonym of "Laura Walters". The next year the two moved to middays at WRC, now as "The Bohannons". In 1980, the pair left the Washington area to work mornings at station WCFL in Chicago. At the time of the move, Camille was quoted as saying: "People ask how we can be together so much, but my answer is that we're making up for the first five years when I was a DJ at night and Jim did news during the day and we never saw each other." However, the couple eventually divorced. Camille went on to become a noted broadcaster, with a long career at the Associated Press and United Press International.

Bohannon and his second wife Annabelle attended high school together but lost touch after graduation. Said Bohannon of her, "I just worshipped her in high school, but she dated the football captain and I didn't make any time with her." Thirty-three years later they got reacquainted at a book signing in Columbia, Missouri, and were married on August 21, 1998.

As hobbies he enjoyed reading science fiction, playing tennis and the trombone, something he had done since high school. He was a staunch supporter of the Jerry Hoover scholarship at Lebanon High School, serving as its honorary chairman. The scholarship is named in honor of Bohannon's former band director and is awarded to a student who will be attending Missouri State University and participating in the instrumental music program. Bohannon also did much work with the Smithsonian Associates. He remained close to his Missouri roots however, often mentioning his hometown of Lebanon, the trout fishing at nearby Bennett Spring State Park, and even once broadcasting an entire week of his shows from the Ozark Empire Fairgrounds in Springfield. The Bohannons resided in the Washington D.C. suburb of Montgomery Village, Maryland.

In an October 2022 interview, Bohannon stated he had terminal esophageal cancer, with only a 50 percent chance of surviving the remainder of the year. He died in Seneca, South Carolina, on November 12, 2022, at the age of 78.
