= WTLP =

- Braddock Heights, Maryland; United States
- Broadcast area: Frederick County, Maryland
- Frequency: 103.9 MHz (HD Radio)

Programming
- Language: English
- Format: Contemporary Christian
- Subchannels: HD2: Simulcast of WTOP-FM (all-news); HD3: Simulcast of WSHE (freeform)
- Affiliations: K-Love

Ownership
- Owner: Hubbard Broadcasting; (Washington, DC FCC License Sub, LLC)
- Operator: Educational Media Foundation
- Sister stations: WHFS; WFED; WSHE

History
- First air date: April 8, 1972
- Former call signs: WMHI-FM (1972–1975); WZYQ-FM (1975–1988); WZYQ (1988–1995); WXVR (1995–1996); WWVZ (1996–2006); WGYS (2006–2007)
- Call sign meaning: disambiguation of WTOP-FM

Technical information
- Licensing authority: FCC
- Facility ID: 47105
- Class: A
- ERP: 350 watts
- HAAT: 292 meters (958 ft)
- Transmitter coordinates: 39°27′53.3″N 77°29′41.9″W

Links
- Public license information: Public file; LMS
- Webcast: Listen live
- Website: klove.com

WTLP (103.9 FM) is a non-commercial contemporary Christian radio station licensed to serve Braddock Heights, Maryland. Owned by Hubbard Broadcasting and leased to the Educational Media Foundation, WTLP does not broadcast any local programming, functioning as one of two Washington, D.C.-market network affiliates for K-Love.

== History ==
This station signed on in 1972 as WMHI-FM, an FM simulcast partner to Frederick-based WMHI (then on 1370 AM, now WSHE on 820 AM). From 1975 through 1988, the two stations were contemporary hit radio WZYQ and WZYQ-FM, first branded "14ZYQ" and later "Z104" to emphasize the FM side. That year, the AM side switched to country music, and the CHR format continued on WZYQ-FM alone.

In 1995, Liberty Broadcasting, the owner of oldies-formatted WXTR-FM 104.1 in Waldorf, Maryland, purchased WZYQ. Liberty's intent was to use the station as a simulcast partner to WXTR-FM to cover the northern half of the Washington, D.C. metro area, and changed its callsign to WXVR to match. The following year, Bonneville International bought the two stations and flipped them to CHR, once again branded "Z104"; 103.9 FM became WWVZ.

On January 4, 2006, Bonneville moved the all-news programming of WTOP (1500 AM) to the facility of longtime Washington classical music station WGMS-FM 103.5. The classical music moved to the 103.9/104.1 pair, which became WGYS and WGMS. Later that year, an effort to sell the two frequencies to Washington Redskins owner Daniel Snyder fell through. Snyder planned to buy the stations and convert them to a sports radio format. On January 22, 2007, Bonneville flipped WGMS and WGYS to adult hits as "George 104", with a branding referencing George Washington as the typical Jack FM brand is trademarked. It also announced an agreement with WETA (90.9 FM) to switch to classical from news-talk public radio; WETA hired WGMS' program director and Bonneville donated its music library.

"George 104" lasted only three months, as in April Bonneville leased 104.1 FM to Radio One, who flipped that station to urban gospel. WGYS changed call signs to WTLP and began simulcasting WTOP-FM.

Bonneville sold 14 stations to Hubbard Broadcasting, including WTOP-FM and its two repeaters, in January 2011.

On July 29, 2026, Hubbard announced a local marketing agreement to lease WTLP to the Educational Media Foundation, which flipped the station to K-Love on August 1. Station management stated that WTOP-FM's good coverage of Frederick County and the advent of streaming lessened the need to retain a simulcaster in the area. The lease runs through December 31, 2029, at which point it will be extended for an additional three years if neither side opts out. WTLP retains a WTOP-FM simulcast on its second HD Radio subchannel, while its third subchannel continues broadcasting Hubbard's freeform "The Gamut" music service based at WSHE. WTLP is one of three Washington-market K-Love affiliates, in addition to WLZV (94.3 FM), serving the western and southern portion of the market, and WLVW (107.3 FM), serving its core.
