= KFUN =

KFUN may refer to:

- KFUN (AM), a radio station (1230 AM) licensed to Las Vegas, New Mexico, United States
- CKKW-FM, formerly branded "KFUN 99.5", a radio station (now at 105.3 FM) licensed to Kitchener, Ontario, Canada
