= Camille Bohannon =

American radio announcer and journalist

- Born: Mary Camille Skora
- Education: Highlands University
- Occupations: Journalist; Radio broadcaster
- Known for: Radio broadcasting and journalism

Camille Bohannon is an American broadcaster who spent four decades in radio, including working as an anchor/reporter for the U.S. national news networks of NBC, Mutual, United Press International and AP Broadcast. After retiring in 2008, she continued to work part-time as a voice-over and narrator announcer. She has also served as a member of the Broadcast Committee of the U.S. National Press Club.

== Early life ==
Born Mary Camille Skora, Bohannon was the only child of Lillian Marie and George W. Skora. As the daughter of a State Department foreign service employee, she lived in eight countries and learned to speak four languages. She graduated cum laude in 1968 from Highlands University in Las Vegas, New Mexico, where she was named "Woman of the Year". In 2008 the university recognized her as a "distinguished alumna".

== Radio career ==
Bohannon first became involved in broadcasting by chance. At Highlands she studied language and political science, with the general idea of following her father into foreign service work. However, she was asked to provide commentary about the university's homecoming parade by the local cable TV company's CATV-Channel 2, which evolved into a daily news program that was also carried by local radio station KFUN, which later hired her as a disc jockey.

After moving to the Washington, D. C. area, in 1970 she began working at a series of regional radio stations, beginning with the overnight program at WHFS, a suburban Maryland outlet. After that station changed to fulltime rock programming, she moved to weekend shifts at WETA and WWDC. In 1976 she and then-husband Jim Bohannon began hosting radio station WTOP's morning program. However, the station owner did not want the show to be labeled as a "husband and wife team", so Camille had to adopt the pseudonym of "Laura Walters". The next year the two moved to middays at WRC, with Camille now allowed to use her own name.

In 1980 the pair left D.C. to work mornings at WCFL in Chicago. At the time of the move Camille was quoted as saying: "People ask how we can be together so much, but my answer is that we're making up for the first five years when I was a DJ at night and Jim did news during the day and we never saw each other." However, the couple eventually divorced.

Camille Bohannon later moved back to the Washington, D.C. area, where she generally continued to use her married name, while sometimes broadcasting using the pseudonym "Ann Taylor". During the rest of her career she primarily worked in a series of national radio network news positions. In late 1983, she joined the United Press International Radio Network as an anchor. In 1987 she became a part-time anchor at Westwood One, and in 1990 became fulltime anchor of NBC Radio Networks overnight hourly newscasts. In 1993 she joined Associated Press Radio as an anchor/reporter. While at AP, she wrote and recorded the daily "Today in History" series.

After retiring in 2008, Bohannon continued to work on individual voice-over and narration projects.

== Personal life ==
Camille married Jim Bohannon in Silver Spring, Maryland in late 1970. Although they later divorced, she kept her married name.
