= KLWT (disambiguation) =

KLWT was an American news radio station broadcast in Lebanon, Missouri.

KLWT may also refer to:

- Kristie-Lee Weston-Turner (born 2005), Australian rules footballer for Western Bulldogs and North Melbourne
- Lewistown Municipal Airport, airport in Lewiston, Montana assigned KLWT

== See also ==
- KLVT, American talk radio station in Levelland, Texas
