= Washington Post Radio =

Former news radio service in the United States

Washington Post Radio was an attempt by Bonneville Broadcasting and The Washington Post to create a commercial long-form all-news radio network in the style of National Public Radio. The small network of stations based in the Washington, D.C., area occupied the AM 1500 frequency, which up to the point of the founding of WPR was the home of Bonneville's all-news WTOP, and is set to be given to WFED.

Logo user for "Washington Post Radio"

WTWP-AM-FM, WTWT and W282BA all were former frequencies and simulcasts of sister station WTOP. WTWP-AM-FM were spun off the WTOP simulcast on March 30, 2006 with the sign-on of "Washington Post Radio" as WTWP-AM-FM. The primary AM station had been WTOP since 1943 (and dates its history back to Brooklyn, New York, station WTRC in 1926), while WTWP-FM had been a simulcast of WTOP since 1998. WWWB had simulcast WTOP since 2001, before switching to a simulcast of WTWP as WTWT on June 28, 2007.

During the weekday hours, WTWP provided news and commentary in a long-form style similar to that of National Public Radio, but on a commercial station staffed and programmed jointly by The Washington Post and WTOP. From 8 PM to 5 AM ET, the station was programmed as a general interest talk radio station, featuring hosts such as Clark Howard, Larry King and Jim Bohannon. On weekends, WTWP rebroadcast programs produced by Radio Netherlands and George Washington University along with original long-form content such as a call-in show with Post automotive columnist Warren Brown.

The Tony Kornheiser Show, hosted by Post columnist, host of ESPN's Pardon the Interruption, and Monday Night Football analyst Tony Kornheiser, moved to WTWP on February 20, 2007. The program aired weekday mornings from 8:30 to 10:30, and was replayed from 10:30 to 12:30 pm and at other times of the day. Kornheiser left the program at the end of June, 2007 to resume his Monday Night Football duties (Post Radio anchor David Burd, among others, will fill in the post until Kornheiser returns after the 2007–08 season).

WTWP, like WTOP and WWWT, was a member of the CBS Radio Network, and retransmitted the audio portion of the CBS television shows Face the Nation and 60 Minutes.

== Demise ==
The Washington Post reported that they would discontinue the Washington Post Radio service after Bonneville decided to pull the plug, citing financial losses and low ratings.

Bonneville International officially launched personality driven talk format Talk Radio 3WT, with the WWWT callsign on September 20, 2007. Kornheiser's show, still produced in agreement with the Post, returned to the station in January 2008 and ran again through June 2008. 3WT, in turn, was closed in fall 2008, and its frequencies were given back to WFED and WTOP. The overnight talk programming will remain on WFED, since the original WFED was a daytime-only station with no programming in that time slot.

Kornheiser's show ended up on WTEM. The WTWT calls now reside on a Christian rock radio station in the Twin Tiers.
