= Leslie Marshall (journalist) =

American Talk Show Host

- Born: Leslie Fletcher; October 2, 1972 (age 53)
- Education: Northeastern University (BS), Emerson College (MA)
- Occupations: Talk show host, commentator, actress
- Years active: 1998 - present
- Website: lesliemarshallshow.com

Leslie Marshall (born Leslie Fletcher; October 2, 1972) is a liberal radio talk host, hosting since 1988, and a commentator on national television since 2001. Leslie became the youngest person ever to be nationally syndicated on radio when she replaced Tom Snyder on the ABC Satellite Radio Network in 1992. She was also the first woman to host an issues-oriented program nationwide.

== Broadcast career ==
Leslie Marshall hosts the nationally syndicated The Leslie Marshall Show (in its 5th year), she is also a Fox News contributor and blogs weekly for U.S. News & World Report as well as POLITICO.

Leslie Marshall has been a radio talk hostess for 23 years. Marshall is currently nationally syndicated by TalkUSA Radio.

Marshall started her broadcasting career as a radio news reporter in Boston, and then worked in radio and television in Miami, Florida. While in Miami, Marshall did news, traffic, weather and disc jockey work. One night, when hosting an overnight nostalgic music program, she did a special "Remembrance" hour in which veterans called in with their experiences. It was that night Leslie was discovered by a program director at the talk station across town. He phoned her and told her she might have missed her calling.

After years of anchoring, reporting and hosting music programs, Marshall moved to talk radio. She started her talk radio career at WNWS in Miami where she remained for three years.

Marshall next worked mid-days at WGR in Buffalo, followed by mid-days at KPRC in Houston. In 1992, Marshall replaced Tom Snyder on the ABC Satellite Radio Network. Her program ran for three years on over 200 stations nationwide.

After three years the network disbanded and Leslie went to work for WLS-FM in Chicago hosting an afternoon drive talk show. She then joined KGO radio in San Francisco, and hosted a midday show on KHTK/Hot Talk in Sacramento. On television, she hosted "Bay Talk" on KRON-TV, the local NBC affiliate in the city by the bay.

Two years later, Marshall returned to Chicago at WLS; in addition, she co-hosted "Beyond the Beltway" on WGR-TV and remained in Chicago for over two years. She then joined her husband in Los Angeles. She hosted talk shows on KFI, KLSX and KABC radio on weekends, and was finally signed to KLAC, KFI's sister station at its inception. KLAC remained a talk station for two years and Leslie was there the entire time hosting early evening weeknights. When KLAC flipped formats, Marshall decided to stay in Los Angeles with her husband.

After KLAC flipped to music, Marshall hosted her own show for a year on WWKB in Buffalo, New York, a 50,000-watt powerhouse heard throughout the northeastern United States and Greater Toronto and Hamilton Area. After a year at WWKB, Marshall was nationally syndicated. Her show airs every weeknight on WWKB.

== Other media appearances ==
Marshall is a regular political pundit on Fox News and previously on CNBC's Kudlow & Company. She is also a regular contributor on CNN’s Showbiz Tonight. She has appeared on Fox news programs The O'Reilly Factor and Your World with Neil Cavuto, as well as former programs Hannity & Colmes and The John Gibson show. She was formerly a Varsity Panel Member on the Dennis Miller Show on CNBC until it was cancelled. Leslie has also been seen on Scarborough Country on MSNBC and substituted for Alan Colmes on the Fox Radio Network/nationally, as well as Jim Bohannon on the Westwood One Radio Network.

== Acting career ==
In addition to her radio and television career, Marshall has made guest acting appearances on Desperate Housewives, NYPD Blue, 7th Heaven, Passions, General Hospital, Port Charles, What Should You Do? on Lifetime and various other films.

== Personal life ==
Marshall is an assumed surname (it is her father's middle name and her great-grandmother's last name). Marshall was raised in Somerset, Massachusetts. She earned a Bachelor of Science in Speech Communications from Northeastern University in 1985 and a Masters in Broadcast Journalism from Emerson College.

Her father is of Jewish descent and her mother is Christian.

After having a child die four days prior to birth from Canavan disease, she and her husband tried to adopt from India which was difficult because neither she or her husband was Hindu (he is of Indian Muslim descent). The couple was eventually able to adopt a son from Pakistan. Later, she had a daughter with her husband via in-vitro fertilization.
