= Orchard =

Intentionally planted trees or shrubs that are maintained for food production

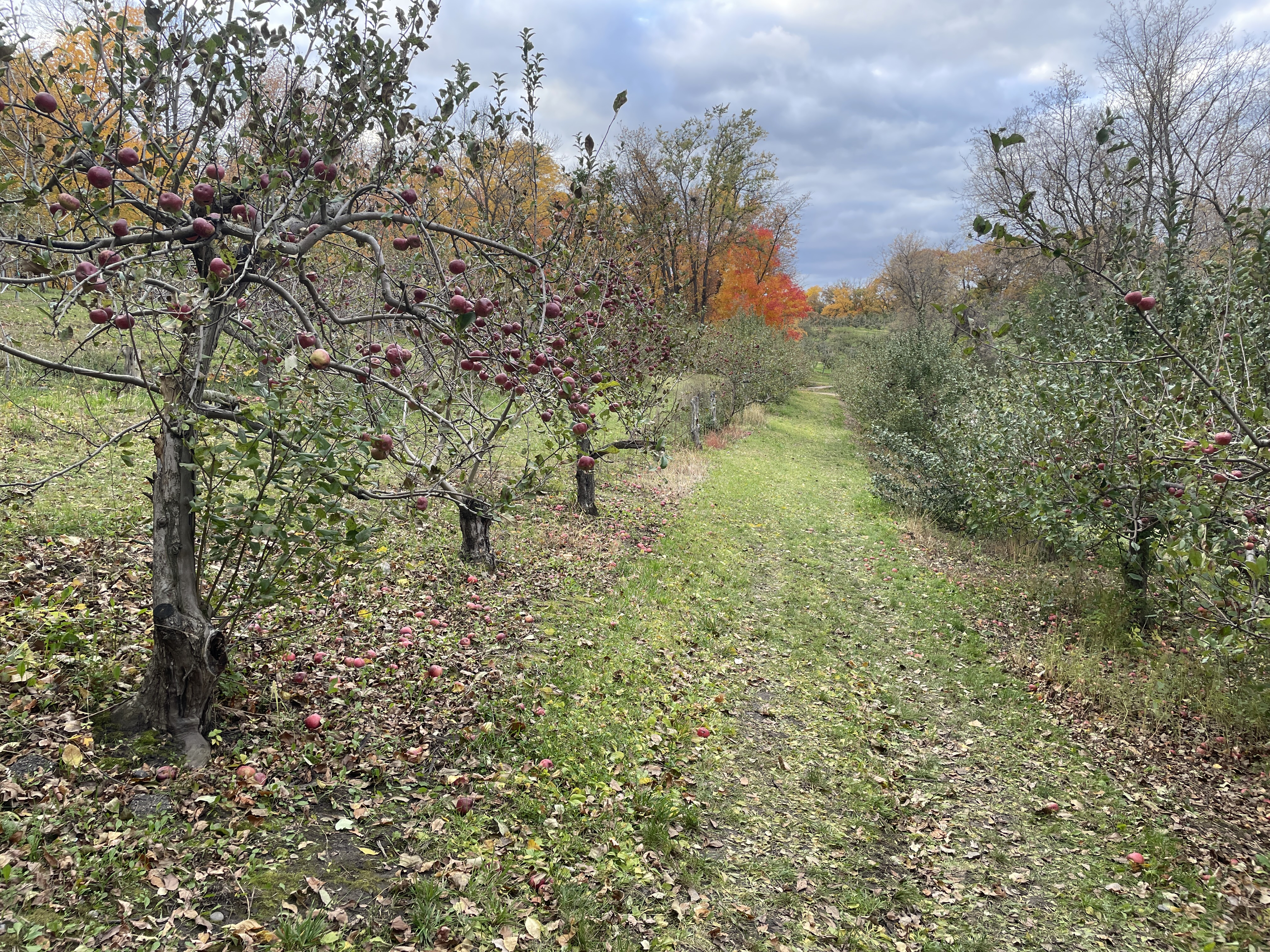
Apple orchard lanes with apples fallen off the trees

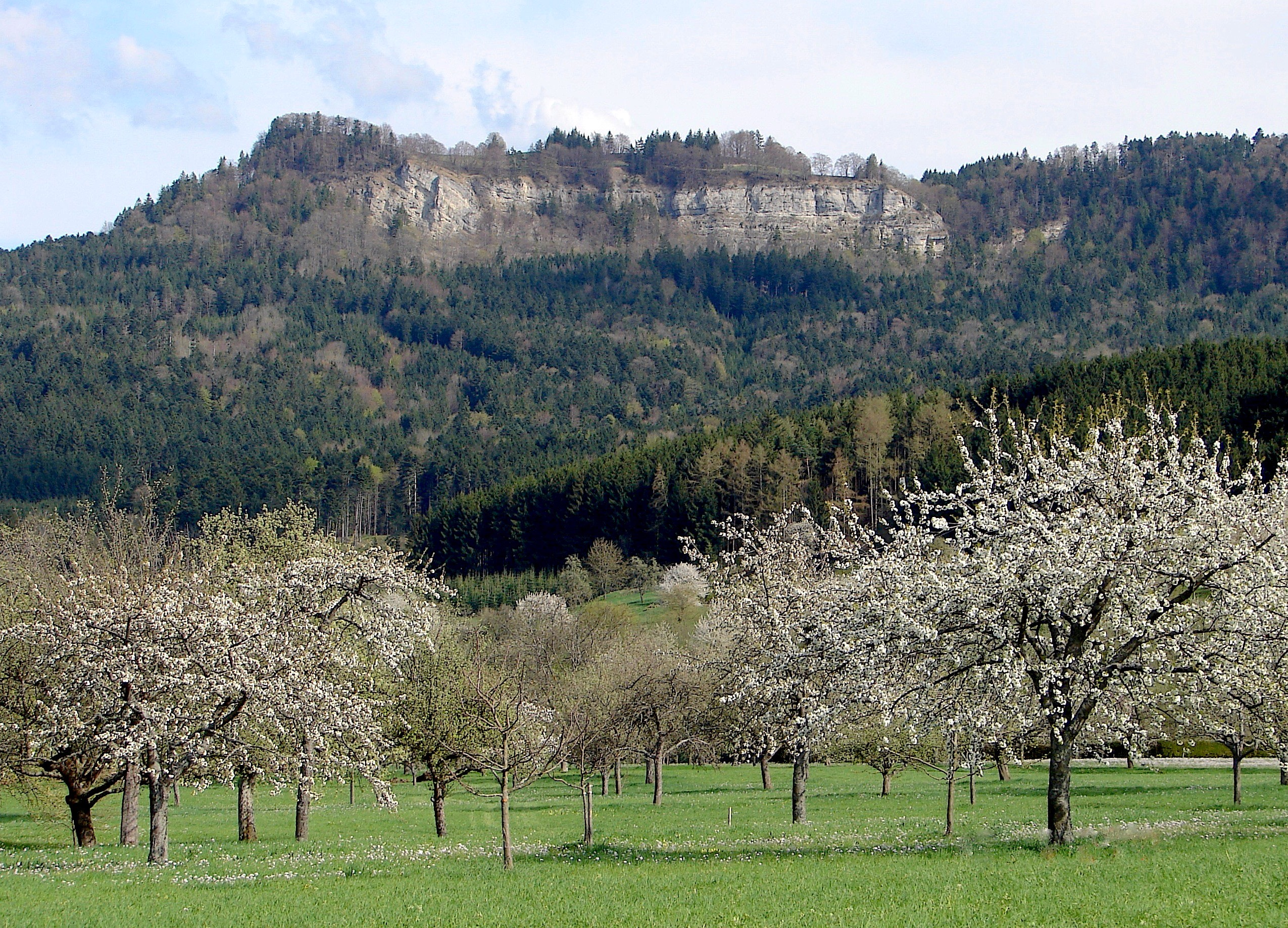
Meadow orchard (Streuobstwiese) with view to the Lochenhörnle

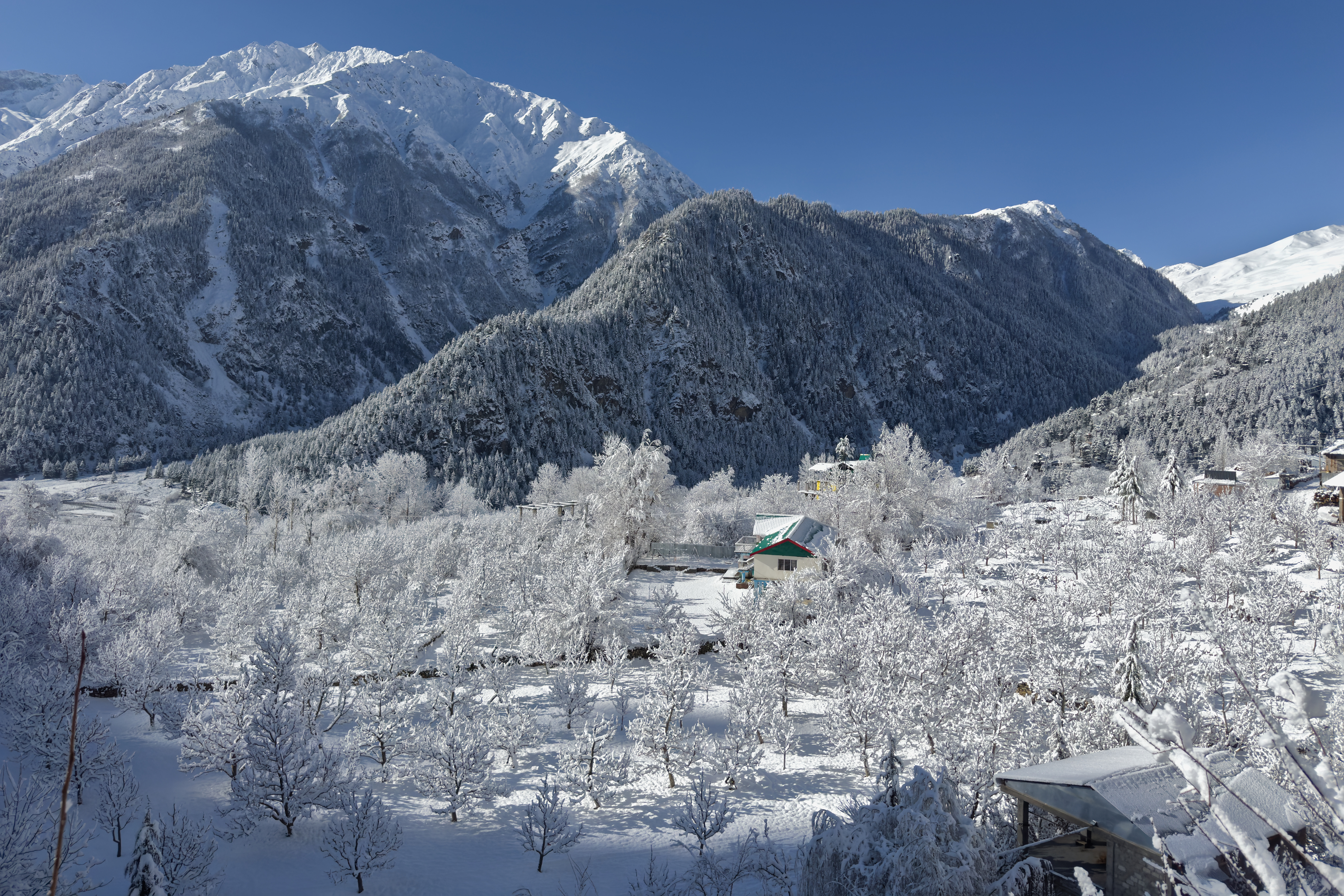
Apple orchards after snowfall in Sangla, India

An orchard is an intentional plantation of trees or shrubs that is maintained for food production. Orchards comprise fruit- or nut-producing trees that are generally grown for commercial production. Orchards are also sometimes a feature of large gardens, where they serve an aesthetic as well as a productive purpose. A fruit garden is generally synonymous with an orchard, although it is set on a smaller, non-commercial scale and may emphasize berry shrubs in preference to fruit trees. Most temperate-zone orchards are laid out in a regular grid, with a grazed or mown grass or bare soil base that makes maintenance and fruit gathering easy.

Most modern commercial orchards are planted for a single variety of fruit. While the importance of introducing biodiversity is recognized in forest plantations, introducing genetic diversity in orchard plantations by interspersing other trees might offer benefits. Genetic diversity in an orchard would provide resilience to pests and diseases, just as in forests.

Orchards are sometimes concentrated near bodies of water where climatic extremes are moderated and blossom time is retarded until frost danger is past.

== Layout ==
An orchard's layout is the technique of planting the crops in a proper system. Natural England defines an orchard's minimum composition as five trees, whose crown edges are no more than 20m apart.

There are different methods of planting, and therefore different types of layout. Some of these layout types are:

- Square method
- Rectangular method
- Quincunx method
- Triangular method
- Hexagonal method
- Contour or terrace method.

For different varieties, these systems may vary to some extent.

== Orchards by region ==
A peach orchard in bloom [ca. 1950]

The most extensive orchards in the United States are apple and orange orchards, although citrus orchards are more commonly called groves. The most extensive apple orchard area is in eastern Washington state, with a lesser but significant apple orchard area in most of Upstate New York. Extensive orange orchards are found in Florida and southern California. In eastern North America, many orchards are along the shores of Lake Michigan (such as the Fruit Ridge Region), Lake Erie, and Lake Ontario.

In Canada, apple and other fruit orchards are widespread on the Niagara Peninsula, south of Lake Ontario. This region is known as Canada Fruitbelt and, in addition to large-scale commercial fruit marketing, it encourages "pick-your-own" activities in the harvest season.

In Spain, Murcia is a major orchard area (or la huerta) in Europe, with citrus crops. New Zealand, China, Argentina, and Chile also have extensive apple orchards.

Tenbury Wells in Worcestershire has been called The Town in the Orchard, since the 19th century, because it was surrounded by extensive orchards. Today, this heritage is celebrated through an annual Applefest.

=== Central Europe ===
Streuobstwiese (pl. Streuobstwiesen) is a German word that means a meadow with scattered fruit trees or fruit trees that are planted in a field. Streuobstwiese, or a meadow orchard, is a traditional landscape in the temperate, maritime climate of continental Western Europe. In the 19th and early 20th centuries, Streuobstwiesen were a kind of rural community orchard that were intended for the productive cultivation of stone fruit. In recent years, ecologists have successfully lobbied for state subsidies to valuable habitats, biodiversity and natural landscapes, which are also used to preserve old meadow orchards. Both conventional and meadow orchards provide a suitable habitat for many animal species that live in a cultured landscape. A notable example is the hoopoe that nests in tree hollows of old fruit trees and, in the absence of alternative nesting sites, is threatened in many parts of Europe because of the destruction of old orchards.

Orchards in various regions

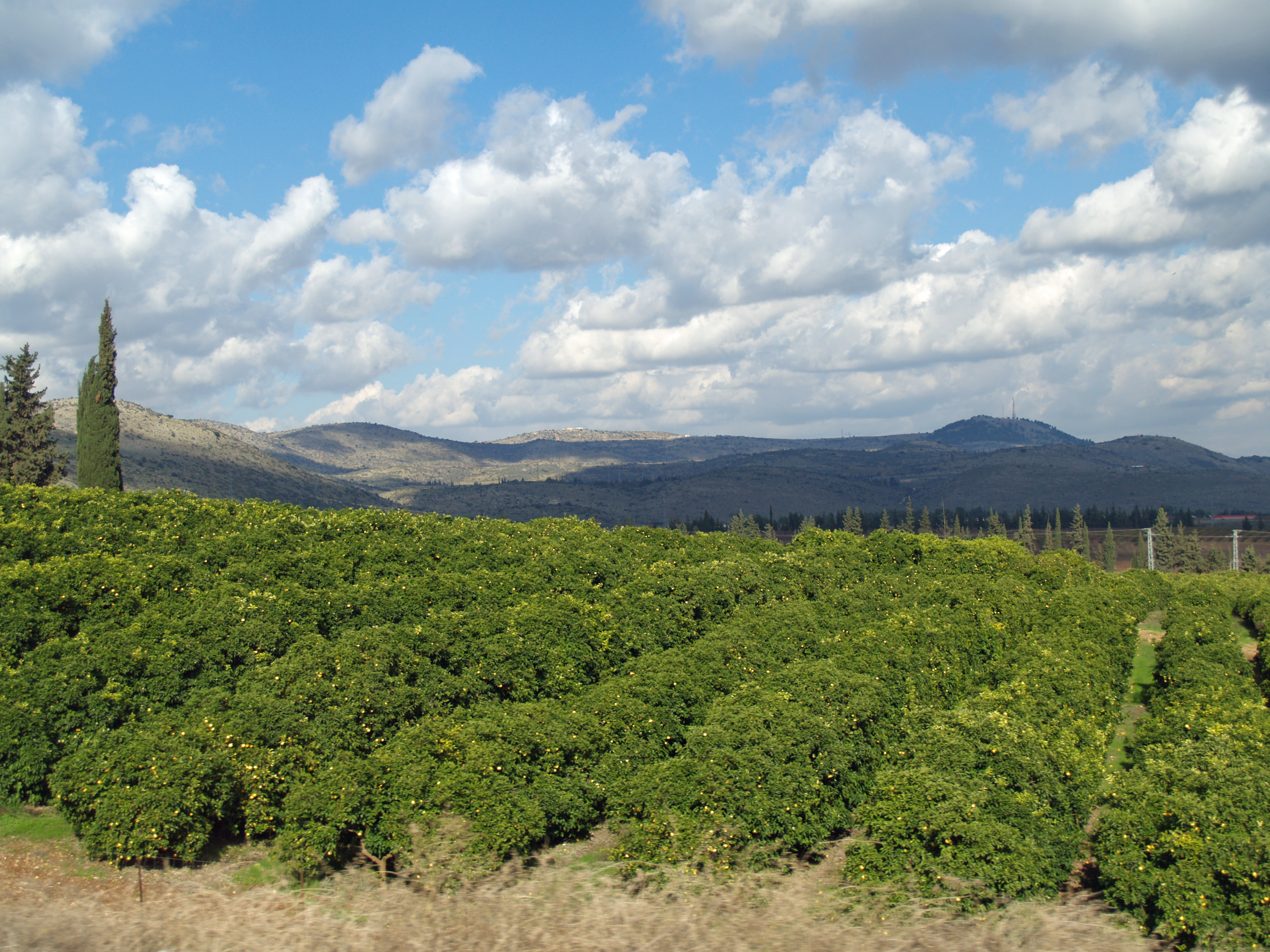
A lemon orchard in the Upper Galilee in Israel

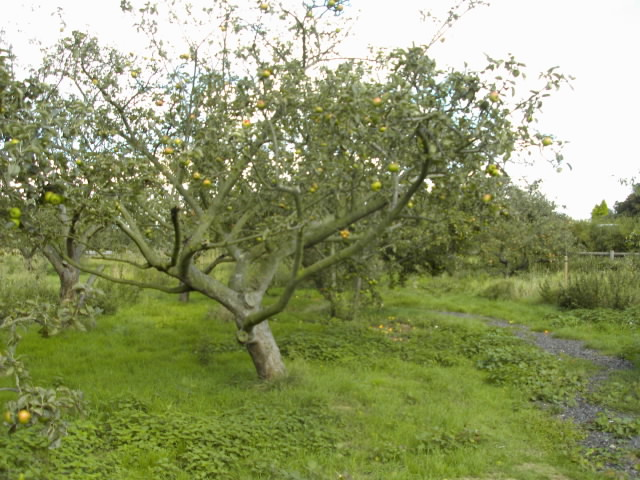
A community apple orchard originally planted for productive use during the 1920s, in Westcliff on Sea (Essex, England)

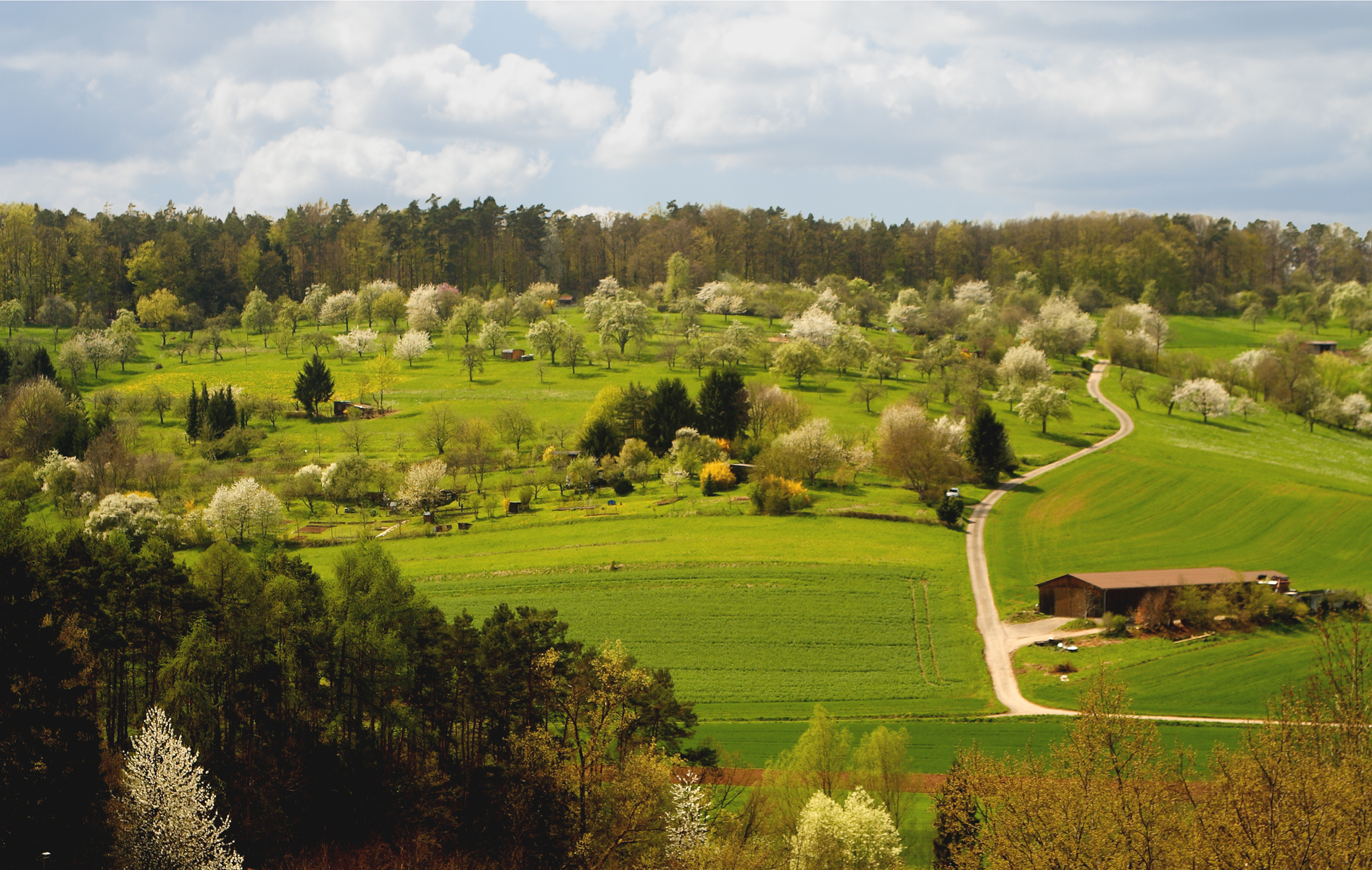
Streuobstwiese, a rural community orchard, traditionally for productive use. Today endorsed for its quality of habitat and biodiversity.

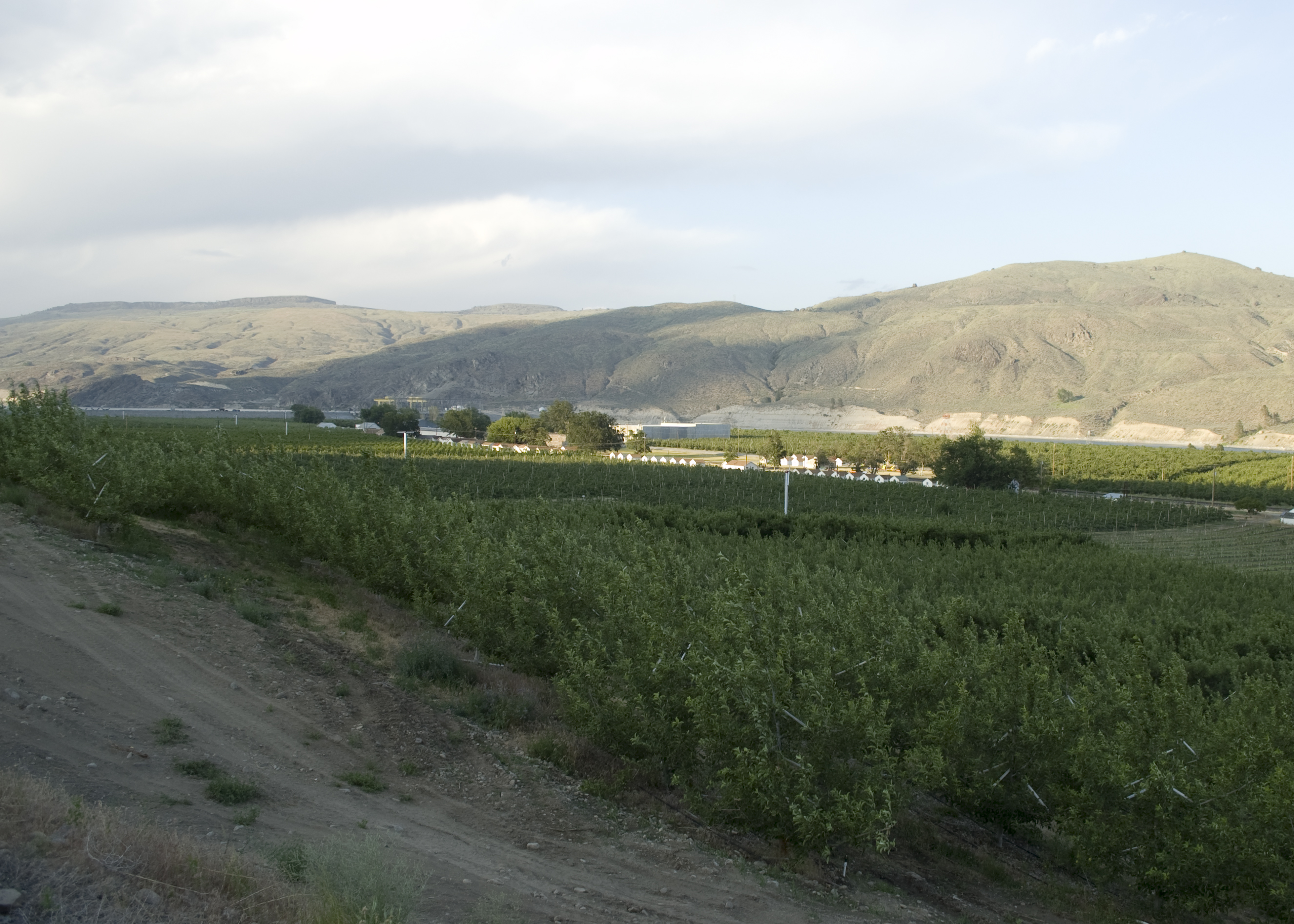
Apple orchards in Azwell, Washington, surrounding a community of pickers' cabins

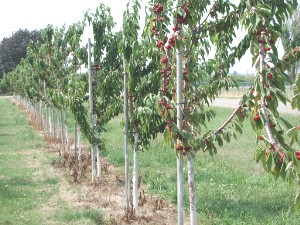
Sour cherry orchard on Lake Erie shoreline (Leamington, Ontario)

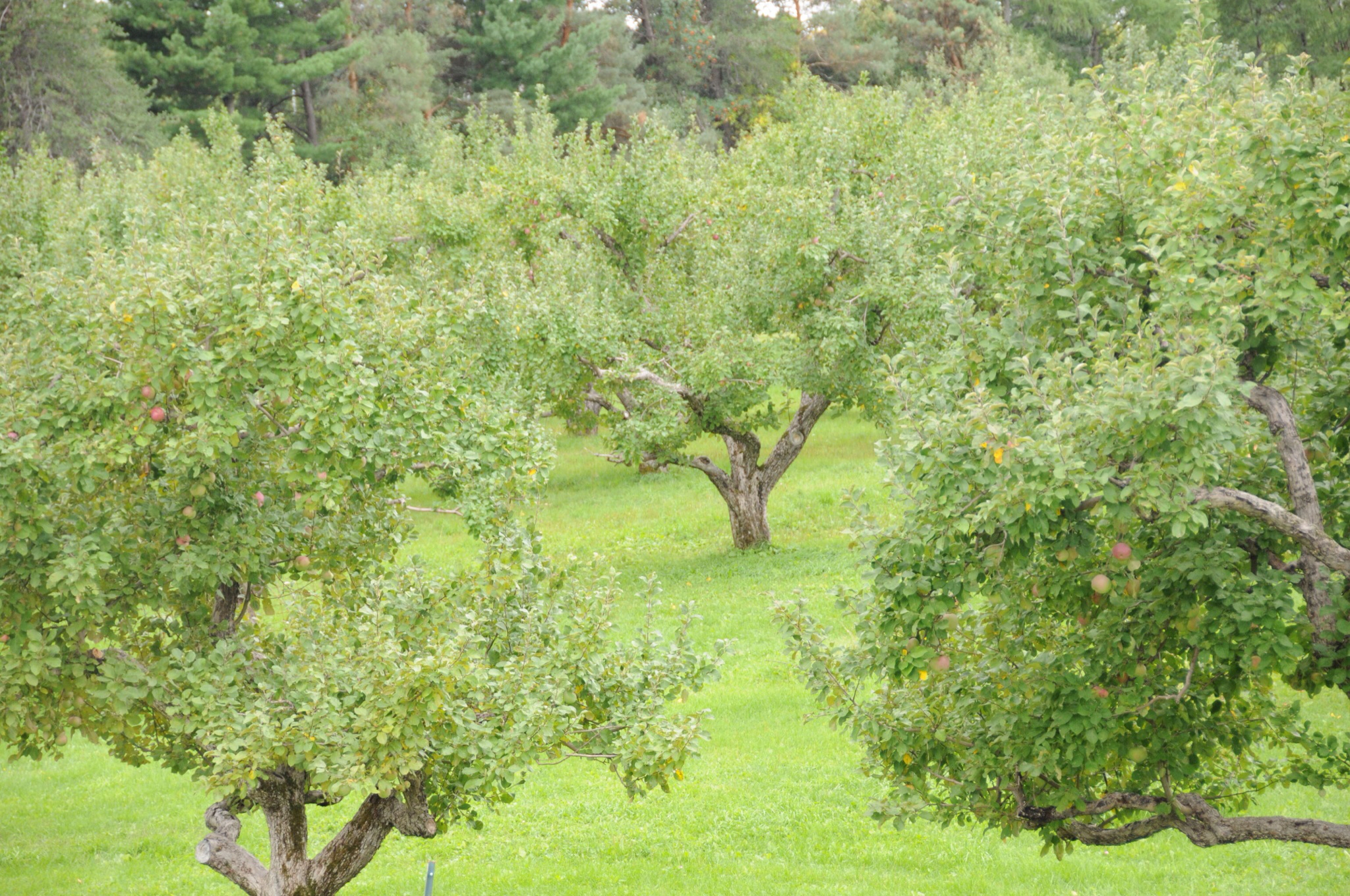
Old growth apple orchard in Ottawa, Canada

== Historical orchards ==
- Orchard House in Concord, Massachusetts, was the residence of American celebrated writer Louisa May Alcott.
- Fruita, Utah, part of Capitol Reef National Park has Mormon pioneer orchards maintained by the US National Park Service.

== Modern orchards ==
Historical orchards have large, mature trees spaced for heavy equipment. Modern commercial apple orchards, by contrast and as one example, are often "high-density" (tree density above 370/ha or 150/acre), and in extreme cases have up to 22,000/ha (9,000/acre). These plants are no longer trees in the traditional sense, but instead resemble vines on dwarf stock and require trellises to support them. In 2025 one-hundred and eleven countries and areas reported a total area of tree orchards of 32.1 million hectares, mostly in Asia (12.1 million ha), Europe (8.44 million ha) and Africa (7.32 million ha).

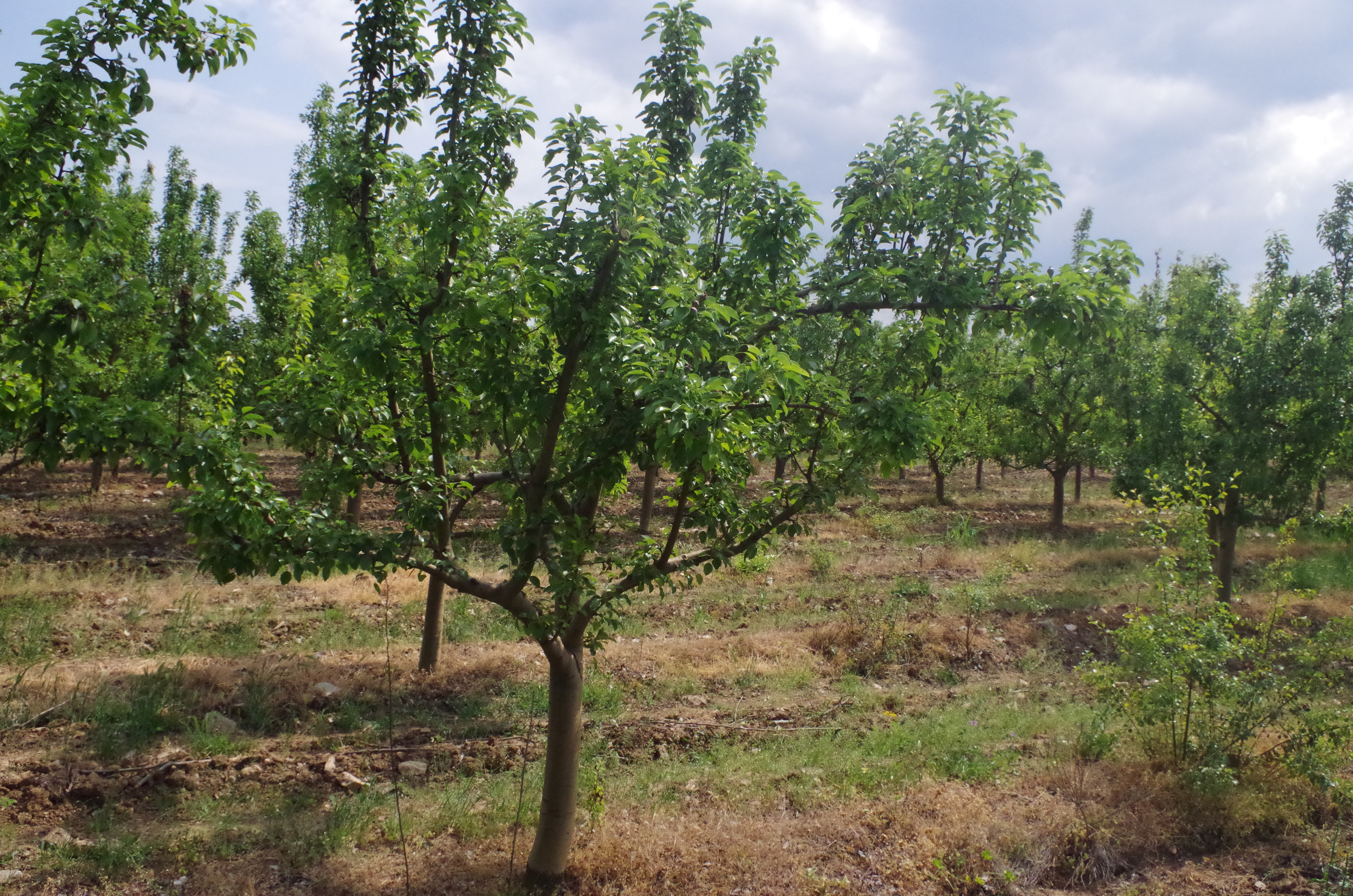
Pear orchard in Sirkovo, North Macedonia

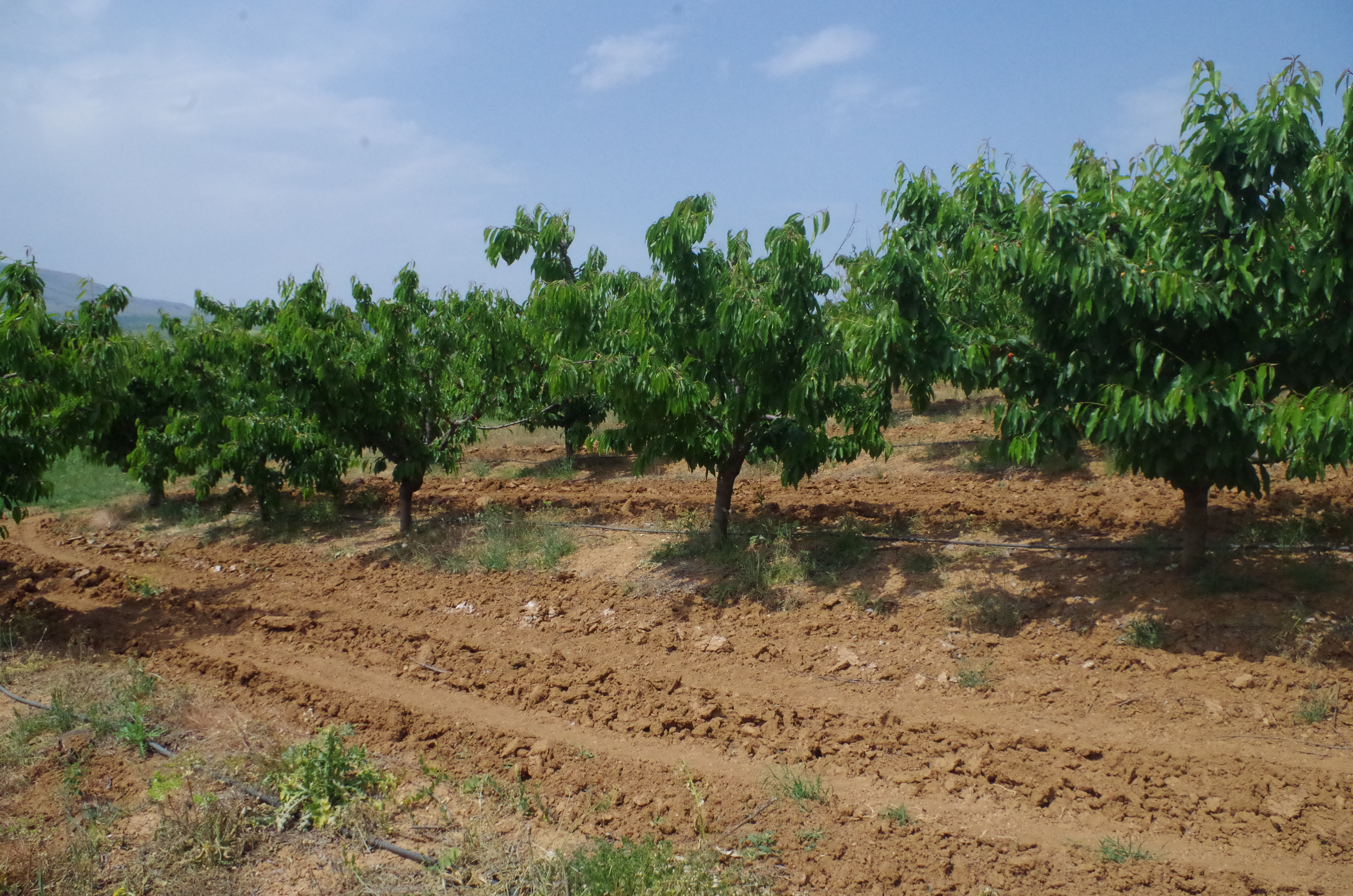
Cherry orchard in Sirkovo, North Macedonia

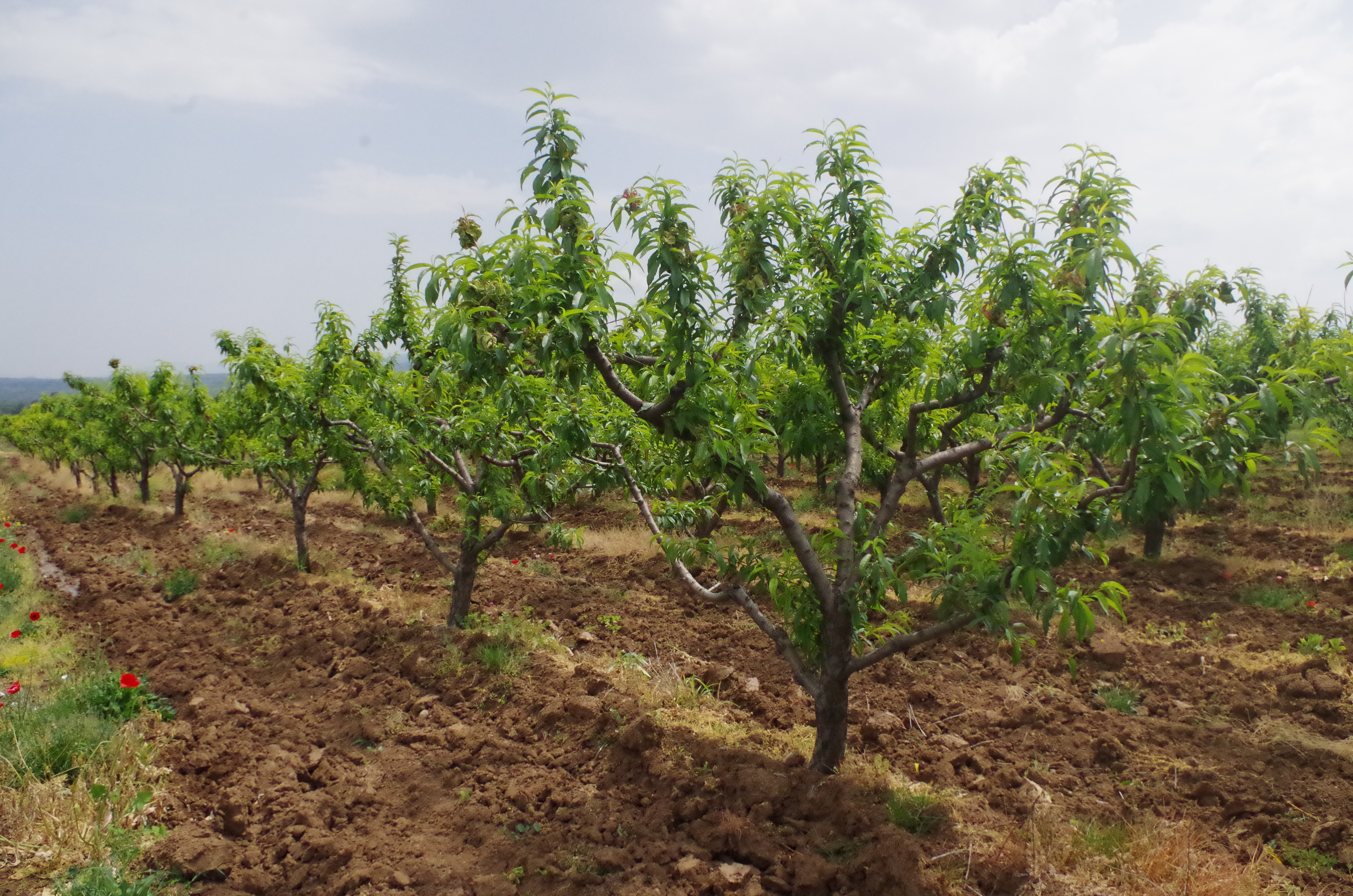
Peach orchard in Sirkovo, North Macedonia

== Orchard conservation in the UK ==
- Natural England, through its Countryside Stewardship Scheme, Environmental Stewardship and Environmentally Sensitive Areas Scheme, gives grant aid and advice for the maintenance, enhancement or re-creation of historical orchards.
- The Orchard Link organisation provides advice on how to manage and restore the county of Devon's orchards, as well as enabling the local community to use the local orchard produce. An organisation called Orchards Live carries out similar work in North Devon.
- People's Trust for Endangered Species (PTES) has mapped every traditional orchard within England and Wales and manages the national inventory for this habitat.
- The UK Biodiversity Partnership lists traditional orchards and a priority UK Biodiversity Action Plan habitat.
- The Wiltshire Traditional Orchards Project maps, conserves and restores traditional orchards within Wiltshire, England.
- An interim report from the National Trust showed that orchards had reduced in scale from approximately 95,000 hectares in the period 1892–1914, to 41,000 hectares overall in 2022. The campaign #BlossomWatch is part of a wider programme of work by the Trust to plant 68 new orchards by 2025, and four million trees with blossom by 2030.

== See also ==
- Climate-friendly gardening
- Fruit tree forms
- Fruit tree pollination
- Fruit tree propagation
- Fruit tree pruning
- Wood industry

== Sources ==
This article incorporates text from a free content work. Licensed under CC BY 4.0 (license statement/permission). Text taken from Global Forest Resources Assessment 2025, Food and Agriculture Organization of the United Nations (FAO).
