= KFUN (AM) =

- Las Vegas, New Mexico; United States
- Frequency: 1230 kHz

Programming
- Format: Country

Ownership
- Owner: Baca Broadcasting LLC

Technical information
- Licensing authority: FCC
- Facility ID: 34442
- Class: C
- Power: 1,000 watts unlimited
- Transmitter coordinates: 35°35′48″N 105°12′21″W
- Translator: K279BW at 103.7 MHz (Las Vegas)

Links
- Public license information: Public file; LMS
- Webcast: Listen Live
- Website: KFUN (AM) website

KFUN (1230 kHz) is a commercial AM radio station in Las Vegas, New Mexico. The station broadcasts a country music radio format and is owned by Baca Broadcasting LLC.

KFUN broadcasts at 1,000 watts non-directional. It is also heard on 20 watt FM translator K279BW at 103.7 MHz.

== Personalities ==
Camille Bohannon began her radio broadcasting career at KFUN. As a Highlands University student, she was asked to provide commentary about the university's homecoming parade by the local cable TV company's CATV-Channel 2, which evolved into a daily news program that was also carried by KFUN, which later hired her as a disc jockey.
