= Wiltshire Traditional Orchards Project =

Organisation that records, conserves and restores orchards

The Wiltshire Traditional Orchards Project (WTOP) is an organisation that maps, conserves and restores traditional orchards within Wiltshire, England. Founded in 2008 it is based at the Wiltshire Wildlife Trust headquarters in Devizes. As of January 2010 the project had 200 volunteers.

The project is funded by Natural England Countdown 2010 Biodiversity Action Fund.

== Ground truthing ==
The project undertakes ground truth surveys to determine the reliability and accuracy of national records, age and condition of the orchards and to distinguish between traditional and non-traditional orchards.

The results are published in the People's Trust for Endangered Species National Orchard Inventory. The national inventory is publicly available for download, or can be explored interactively.
