= KLWT =

- Logo displaying the colors of the American flag
- Lebanon, Missouri; United States
- Frequency: 1230 kHz

Programming
- Language: English
- Format: News talk information
- Affiliations: Salem Radio Network

Ownership
- Owner: Go Productions LLC
- Sister stations: KCLQ

History
- First air date: July 4, 1948
- Last air date: October 17, 2016

Technical information
- Facility ID: 36876
- Class: C
- Power: 1,000 watts unlimited
- Transmitter coordinates: 37°40′40″N 92°41′16″W

KLWT (1230 AM) was a radio station in Lebanon, Missouri, United States, which operated from 1948 to 2016 and last broadcast a news talk information format. The station was owned by Go Productions LLC and featured programming from Salem Radio Network.

Go Productions surrendered the station's broadcast license to the Federal Communications Commission (FCC) on October 17, 2016; the FCC subsequently cancelled the station's license and deleted its call sign on November 9, 2016.

== Notable staff ==
- Jim Bohannon – radio talk show host and member of the National Radio Hall of Fame. His career began at KLWT as a teenager growing up in Lebanon. He retired on October 14, 2022.
