= WFED =

Clear-channel news/talk radio station in Washington, D.C.

- Washington, D.C.; United States
- Broadcast area: Washington–Baltimore metropolitan area
- Frequency: 1500 kHz
- Branding: Federal News Network

Programming
- Language: English
- Format: News/talk
- Affiliations: ABC News Radio; Associated Press; CBS News Radio; Voice of America; Westwood One; WTOP-FM; WUSA

Ownership
- Owner: Hubbard Broadcasting; (Washington DC FCC License Sub, LLC)
- Sister stations: WHFS; WTOP-FM; WWWT-FM

History
- First air date: 1926
- Former call signs: WTRC (1926–1927); WTFF (1927–1929); WJSV (1929–1943); WTOP (1943–2006); WTWP (2006–2007); WWWT (2007–2008)
- Former frequencies: 1250 kHz (1927); 1470 kHz (1927); 1480 kHz (1927–1928); 1460 kHz (1928–1941)
- Call sign meaning: "Federal News Network"

Technical information
- Licensing authority: FCC
- Facility ID: 74120
- Class: A
- Power: 50,000 watts
- Transmitter coordinates: 39°2′31.39″N 77°2′45.92″W
- Translator: 104.5 W283DG (Sterling, Virginia)
- Repeaters: 103.5 WTOP-HD2 (Washington); 107.7 WWWT-HD2 (Manassas, Virginia)

Links
- Public license information: Public file; LMS
- Webcast: Listen live
- Website: federalnewsnetwork.com

WFED (1500 kHz; branded as Federal News Network) is a 50,000-watt Class A AM radio station in Washington, D.C. The station is owned by Hubbard Broadcasting and broadcasts a news/talk format focused on issues and news pertaining to members and staff of the United States federal government.

WFED's studios are located at Hubbard's broadcast complex in northwest Washington, while its transmitter site is located at a three-tower array in Wheaton, Maryland. The station transmits full-time with a power of 50,000 watts. A single transmitter tower, with a non-directional signal, is used during the day. At night, all three towers are used for a directional pattern, with a null toward the west to protect KSTP in St. Paul, Minnesota. WFED's signal can be heard across most of the Eastern Seaboard at night.

WFED became a Primary Entry Point station for the Emergency Alert System in 2014.

== Programming ==
WFED's weekday programming consists primarily of original news and talk content for federal government employees, the Senior Executive Service, and contractors. While most of this airs on a daily basis, various programming is rotated in the midday hours. Co-owned all-news WTOP-FM 103.5 is simulcast weeknights from 9 p.m. to 5 a.m. and all day on weekends, except for sports coverage. The only syndicated content aired by WFED is America in the Morning to start the weekday broadcast day and Music and the Spoken Word on Sunday mornings.

WFED is the flagship station for George Washington Colonials basketball. It also carries Navy Midshipmen football, men's basketball and selected men's lacrosse games as an affiliate station. Though dropped as all three teams' flagships in favor of WJFK-FM 106.7, the station remains an affiliate of the Washington Capitals, Washington Nationals, and Washington Wizards radio networks.

== Translator ==
| Call sign | Frequency | City of license | FID | ERP (W) | Class | Transmitter coordinates | FCC info |
|---|---|---|---|---|---|---|---|
| W283DG | 104.5 FM | Sterling, Virginia | 202258 | 190 | D | 39°1′3.4″N 77°25′47″W | LMS |

== History ==
=== Establishment in Brooklyn, New York ===
The station was first licensed on September 25, 1926, as WTRC, to the Twentieth Assembly District Regular Republican Club, Inc., 62 Woodbine Street in Brooklyn. It was established during a chaotic period when most government regulation had been suspended, with new stations free to be set up with few restrictions. As of the end of 1926, WTRC was reported to be at 1250 kHz, with a power of 50 watts. The Radio Act of 1927 reestablished governmental oversight of radio broadcasting with the creation of the Federal Radio Commission (FRC).

=== Move south ===
On August 2, 1927, the station's owner was changed to the Independent Publishing Company, the call sign was changed to WTFF, reflecting its affiliation with The Fellowship Forum newspaper, in addition to a relocation to Mount Vernon Hills, Virginia, a southern suburb of Washington, D.C. In the fall of 1928, the call sign was changed to WJSV, the initials of the Fellowship Forum publisher, James S. Vance, who was controversial due to ties he and his newspaper had to the Ku Klux Klan. On November 11, 1928, under the provisions of a major national reallocation by the FRC's General Order 40, WTFF was assigned to a "high-powered regional" frequency of 1460 kHz, with a power of 10,000 watts. The only other station assigned to this frequency was KSTP in Saint Paul, Minnesota.

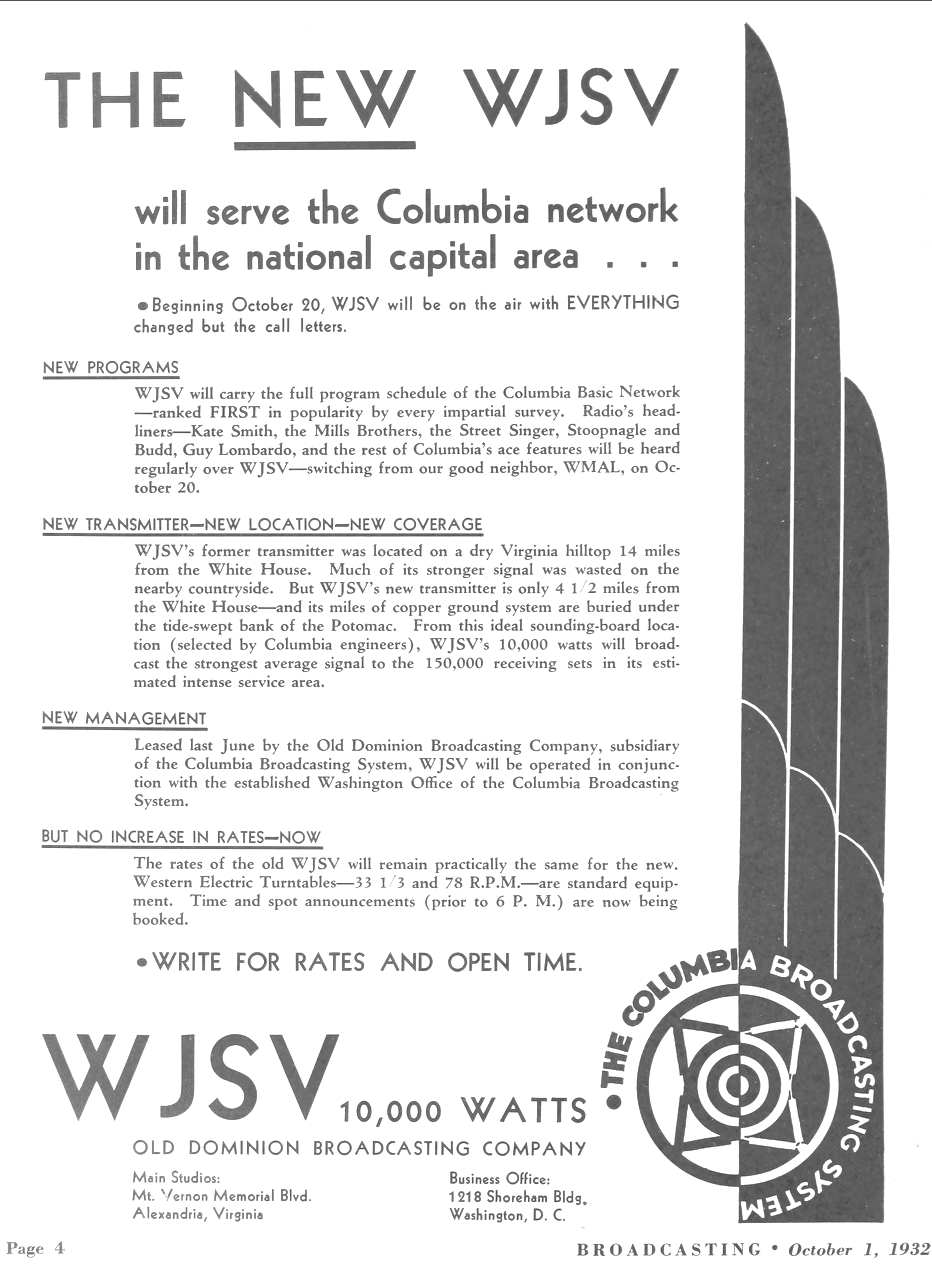
In 1932 the Columbia Broadcasting System assumed control of WJSV

In late 1931, the Columbia Broadcasting System (CBS) applied to construct a 250 watt "booster" station in Washington, retransmitting the signal of its New York City station, however this request was denied by the FRC. As an alternative, CBS next made arrangements to lease WJSV, and took over all of WJSV's programming and engineering costs, with an option to renew or purchase the station after five years. This resulted in the transfer of the local CBS network affiliation from WMAL to WJSV. CBS also moved the transmitter site to Potomac Yards in Alexandria to boost power and improve the coverage pattern.

In June 1932, CBS exercised its option to purchase WJSV outright, and moved its operations to Alexandria, Virginia. After three months off the air, WJSV resumed broadcasting on October 20, 1932. In 1936, with the elimination of the jurisdictional quotas that had been imposed by the Davis Amendment, the station's studios were moved from Alexandria to the Earle Building in Washington. On September 21, 1939, WJSV recorded its entire broadcast day for posterity. The WJSV broadcast day recordings still exist and copies can be found at the Internet Archive and various old time radio websites.

Arthur Godfrey, who later hosted a variety program on CBS Radio and CBS Television, hosted a program on WJSV called The Sundial on which he honed a laid-back, conversational style that was unusual on radio at the time. WJSV was also a key training ground for pioneering newsman Bob Trout in the 1930s before he became a network correspondent. (One of his broadcasting mentors was Wells (Ted) Church, who later became a CBS News executive.) Longtime Los Angeles-area TV newscaster George Putnam worked at WJSV in 1938 and continued to work in radio for seven decades until his death in 2008. Frank Blair, who later became an NBC News correspondent and later was a long time news anchor on the Today show during the 1960s and early 1970s, worked at WJSV. John Daly, longtime host of game show "What's My Line?" and 1950s anchor on ABC-TV news, also got his start on WJSV.

=== 1940s ===
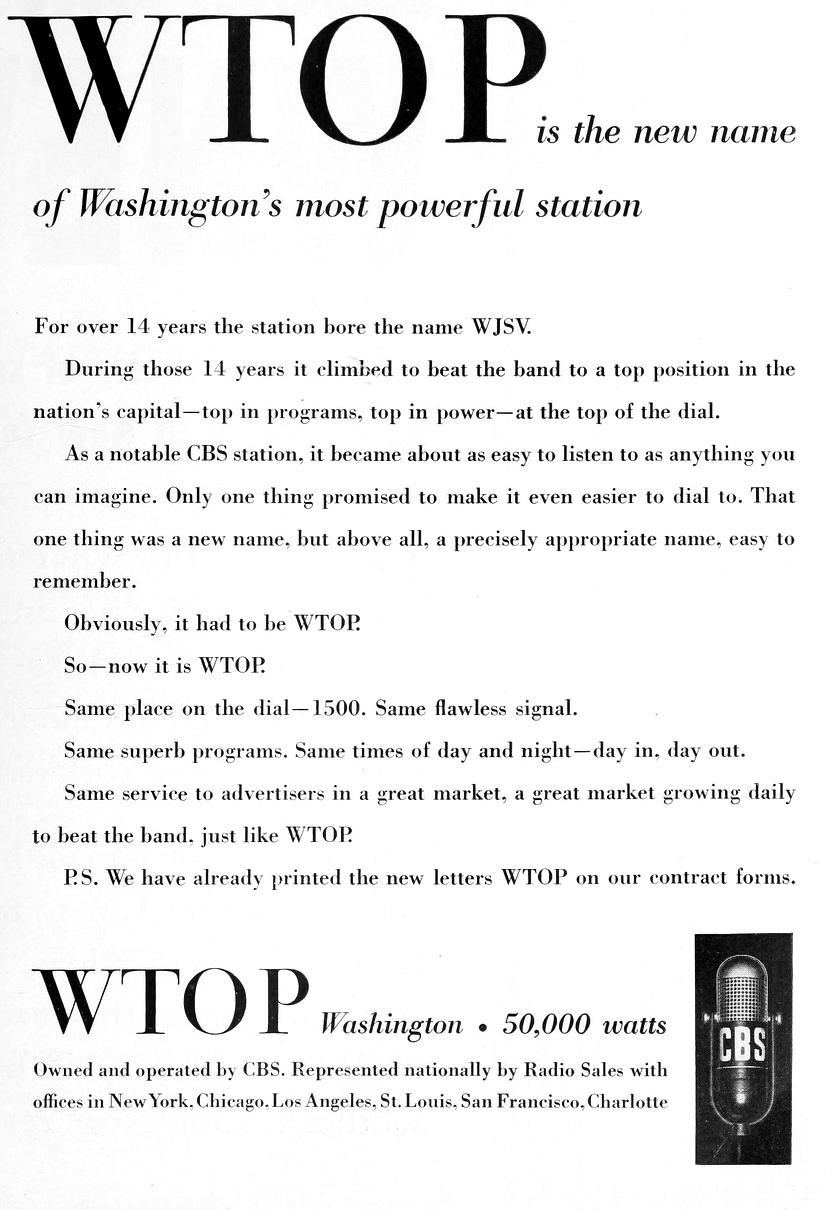
In 1943, the station's call letters were changed to WTOP

In 1940, power was increased to 50,000 watts from a new transmitter site in Wheaton, Maryland. In March 1941, as part of the implementation of the North American Regional Broadcasting Agreement, the station was assigned to its current "clear channel" frequency of 1500 kHz, with the provision that it and KSTP, both "Class I-B" stations, had to maintain directional antennas at night to mutually protect each other from interference.

The station's call letters were changed from WJSV to WTOP on April 4, 1943. The new call sign was selected to be easier to remember. In addition, at this time the highest AM band frequency in the U.S. was 1500 kHz, so the new call sign reflected the station's position near "the top of the dial" on radio receivers.

CBS sold 55 percent majority control of WTOP to The Washington Post in February 1949; this deal was made so CBS could acquire full control of KQW in San Francisco. As part of the transaction, The Post divested WINX (1340 AM), but retained WINX-FM (96.3 FM), which was renamed WTOP-FM, through a legal maneuver. The Post took over the remainder of WTOP in December 1954.

=== 1960s and 1970s: All-news ===
After its signature personality Arthur Godfrey left WTOP in 1948 to concentrate on his television and midday network radio shows, the station gradually faded in popularity as it faced competition from The Washington Star's WMAL with the morning team of Harden and Weaver, and NBC-owned WRC which featured future Today Show personality Willard Scott. In the 1960s, after a series of failed music formats, WTOP phased out its music programming for a combination of newscasts and phone-in talk shows.

A switch to all-news – at first only during the week – came in March 1969. Among those working for WTOP during this time were Sam Donaldson, later on ABC-TV; Jim Bohannon, who took Larry King's place on his all-night radio network talk show after King went to CNN; and including Ralph Begleiter and Jamie MacIntyre, both of whom went to CNN.

WTOP studios were apparently a critical link in Emergency Broadcast System activation scenarios during the Cold War era.

In 1971 the Post donated the original WTOP-FM at 96.3 MHz to Howard University, to "stimulate the intellectual and cultural life of the whole community and to train more people for the communications industry". On December 6, 1971, this station changed its call letters to WHUR-FM.

The Post sold WTOP to The Outlet Company in June 1978, in reaction to the Federal Communications Commission's concerns that common ownership of newspapers and broadcasting outlets in the same city was an unhealthy consolidation of local media. One month later, WTOP-TV was swapped with the Detroit News's WWJ-TV, and became WDVM-TV. The station is today WUSA-TV, owned by Tegna.

=== 1990s–2020s ===
Outlet re-organized and sold WTOP to Chase Broadcasting in 1989, who in turn sold it to Evergreen Media (which eventually became Chancellor Broadcasting) in November 1992. In April 1997, Evergreen's newly acquired 94.3 MHz facility in Warrenton, Virginia, began simulcasting the WTOP signal for better coverage in the sprawling Northern Virginia suburbs. Shortly afterward, on October 10, 1997, Bonneville International Corporation purchased WTOP.

On April 1, 1998, 94.3 was swapped for a stronger signal at 107.7, also licensed to Warrenton. (The 94.3 facility is now K-Love station WLZV.) Then in December 2000, WTOP gained another simulcast in Frederick, Maryland, with WXTR at 820 kHz, establishing the "WTOP Radio Network", a name it used until 2006.

Over its first three decades, WTOP commonly broke the all-news format for sports – including, at various times, the Washington Capitals, Washington Bullets/Wizards, and Baltimore Orioles – and, in its early years, overnight and weekend talk shows. As listeners increasingly indicated a desire for uninterrupted news, this programming dwindled over the years; WTOP completed the transition to 24/7 news when it dropped the Orioles in 1999.

In 2005, the station began providing podcasts of selected broadcast programs, and in 2006, WTOP began broadcasting in digital "HD Radio", using iBiquity Digital Corp.'s IBOC (in-band on-channel) technology.

On January 4, 2006, Bonneville International announced that WTOP would move to a new primary frequency of 103.5 FM, then held by classical station WGMS (which would move to 103.9 and 104.1 FM). WTOP's longtime facility at 1500 AM, as well as both FM translators (107.7 in Warrenton and low-powered 104.3 in Leesburg), would be reassigned to the new "Washington Post Radio" for a March 30, 2006, launch date. This new partnership meant the Post was once again associated with the station it had previously operated as WTOP. WTOP has been dominant in the 25-54 demographics since moving to FM. The stations' respective call signs were changed as of January 11, 2006: the former WTOP pair became WTWP (The Washington Post) and WTOP's new primary stations assumed the WTOP calls.

=== WTWP: "Washington Post Radio" ===
On March 30, 2006, WTOP transitioned entirely to FM, with WTWP (1500 AM) and WTWP-FM 107.7 becoming "Washington Post Radio". The historic WTOP call sign was transferred for a year to 820 AM in Frederick, Maryland, which switched to a Washington Post Radio simulcast as WTWT on June 28, 2007.

As WTWP, these stations provided news and commentary during the weekday hours in a long-form style similar to that of National Public Radio, but on a commercial station staffed and programmed jointly by the Washington Post and WTOP. From 8 pm to 5 am ET, the station was programmed as a general interest talk radio station, featuring hosts such as Clark Howard, Larry King and Jim Bohannon. On weekends, WTWP rebroadcast programs produced by Radio Netherlands and George Washington University.

=== WWWT: "Talk Radio 3WT" ===
The Washington Post reported that they would discontinue the Washington Post Radio service after Bonneville decided to pull the plug, citing financial losses and low ratings.

Bonneville International officially launched personality driven talk format Talk Radio 3WT, with the WWWT call letters on September 20, 2007 (with 820 using the call letters WWWB). The call letters stood for "Whatever We Want" talk radio from the station's imaging. The morning show with David Burd and Jessica Doyle was retained along with all live sporting events, The Tony Kornheiser Show and automotive commentator Pat Goss. Syndicated talkers Neal Boortz, Bill O'Reilly, Randi Rhodes and Phil Hendrie were initially added to the lineup, as was a simulcast of sister station KSL's Nightside with Michael Castner overnight program. Stephanie Miller was added in November after the Washington Nationals' season ended, and Glenn Beck was added, replacing Randi Rhodes on the 1500 and 107.7 frequencies, in January 2008. WWWT was one of the few talk stations in America, at least in major markets, in which the lineup was nearly equally divided among liberal and conservative hosts.

Like WTWP, WWWT remained a member of the CBS Radio Network, and retransmitted the audio portion of the CBS television shows Face the Nation and 60 Minutes. Also surviving the change in format were Larry King and Jim Bohannon, who were carried in the late-night time slots, although King's show was phased out (as part of a nationwide phaseout of all CNN television simulcasts) by Westwood One in 2008.

=== WFED: "Federal News Network" ===
The Federal News Network format was launched by Bonneville International, as FederalNewsRadio.com—the first Internet-only all news station, and the first Internet station to make the jump to terrestrial radio—on February 22, 2000. In 2004 the network began being carried on a radio station, initially on a station in Silver Spring, Maryland, broadcasting on 1050 kHz, which was assigned the call letters WFED. In November 2007, this original WFED increased its daytime power from 1 kW to 3.5 kW to better reach the government office workers in Washington, D.C. comprising its core audience. However, its nighttime coverage was severely limited, as it had to reduce power to 44 watts at sunset.

On August 11, 2008, Bonneville announced the discontinuation of 3WT, and the transfer of the Federal News Radio programming and WFED call letters to AM 1500. This move to the capital's most powerful AM facility resulted in significantly improved daytime and especially nighttme coverage, although coverage in the western suburbs remained weak, as the WFED's nighttime signal is beamed primarily to the north and east. WWWT-FM began simulcasting WTOP-FM (which kept its two other frequencies), while WFED took over WWWT and WWWB's signals. August 11 was the last day for the morning show, The Inner Loop, with David Burd and his team.

For some time before then, WTOP had significant listenership among federal employees, and many of them had emailed the station asking for more coverage tailored to federal employees. The programming concept has changed little to this day, except that the Associated Press' All News Radio service originally filled in during the overnight hours, as a complement to WTOP. When AP All News Radio was terminated, the station began an affiliation with CNN Headline News, which itself was phased out in 2007 by provider Westwood One.

Sports that had been broadcast on 3WT continued on 1500 kHz and 820 kHz. The stations remained the flagships of Washington Nationals baseball until 2011, when the team changed its primary station to WJFK-FM.

Bonneville announced the sale of WFED and WWFD, as well as 15 other stations, to Hubbard Broadcasting on January 19, 2011; this put WFED under common ownership with KSTP, Hubbard's St. Paul, Minnesota station, which was the other clear-channel station on 1500 kHz. The sale was completed on April 29, 2011.

WFED was dropped as the flagship of the Washington Nationals Radio Network in favor of WJFK-FM in 2011, but remains as an affiliate station. WJFK-FM also replaced WFED as the flagship of the Washington Capitals radio network beginning in the 2012-13 season, though WFED also continues to carry that team's games. WFED temporarily returned as the Capitals' flagship in the 2016-17 season when the team and WJFK-FM owner CBS Radio could not extend their agreement.

In October 2018, WFED rebranded from Federal News Radio to Federal News Network, as part of an effort to rebrand the station as a multi-platform outlet.

From July 2017 to December 2022, WFED was also available on WTOP-FM-HD2 in the Washington, D.C. area and WTLP-HD2 in Braddock Heights, Maryland.

== Cully Stimson controversy ==
On January 11, 2007, while being interviewed on WFED's morning program The Federal Drive, then-Deputy Assistant Secretary of Defense for Detainee Affairs Charles "Cully" Stimson criticized some major U.S. law firms for representing detainees at Guantanamo Bay pro bono. Stimson further suggested that U.S. corporations who retained these same U.S. law firms should reconsider their associations with those firms. His comments drew immediate criticism from legal scholars, professional legal associations and the ACLU, and even the Pentagon itself sought to distance itself and the Bush administration from Stimson's comments. Although he apologized a few days later, on February 2, 2007, Stimson resigned his position with the Pentagon, saying he believed the flap would prevent him from effectively doing his job. The controversy heightened the profile of the station, however, as the station's morning hosts and reporters were interviewed by news organizations around the world about the controversy.

== See also ==
- 1926 in radio
