= WTOP-FM =

All-news radio station in Washington, D.C.

WTOP-FM and WWWT-FM
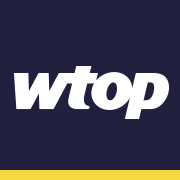

WTOP-FM: Washington, D.C.; WWWT-FM: Manassas, Virginia; United States
- Broadcast area: Washington metropolitan area
- Frequencies: WTOP-FM: 103.5 MHz (HD Radio); WWWT-FM: 107.7 MHz (HD Radio)
- Branding: WTOP Radio; WTOP News

Programming
- Language(s): English
- Format: All-news radio
- Subchannels: HD2: Simulcast of WFED; HD3: Simulcast of WSHE (freeform); HD4: Simulcast of WYRE (adult album alternative)
- Affiliations: ABC News Radio; WJLA-TV

Ownership
- Owner: Hubbard Broadcasting; (Washington, DC FCC License Sub, LLC)
- Sister stations: WFED; WHFS; WSHE

History
- First air date: WTOP-FM: September 12, 1948; WWWT-FM: March 28, 1966
- Former call signs: WTOP-FM: WQQW-FM (1948–1951); WGMS-FM (1951–2006); WWWT-FM: WEER-FM (1966–1981); WXRA (1981–1982); WWWK (1982–1984); WMJR (1984–1992); WRCY (1992–1997); WUPP (1997–1998); WTOP-FM (1998–2006); WTWP-FM (2006–2007)
- Former frequencies: WTOP-FM: 101.7 MHz (1948)
- Call sign meaning: WTOP-FM: carried over from 1500 AM, which was regarded as "the top of the dial"; WWWT-FM: former "3WT" branding

Technical information
- Licensing authority: FCC
- Facility ID: WTOP-FM: 11845; WWWT-FM: 21636
- Class: WTOP-FM: B; WWWT-FM: B
- ERP: WTOP-FM: 44,000 watts (analog); 2,110 watts (digital); WWWT-FM: 29,000 watts
- HAAT: WTOP-FM: 158 meters (518 ft); WWWT-FM: 197 meters (646 ft)
- Transmitter coordinates: WTOP-FM: 38°56′10.6″N 77°5′31.5″W; WWWT-FM: 38°44′30″N 77°50′8″W
- Repeater(s): 103.9 WTLP-HD2 (Braddock Heights, Maryland)

Links
- Public license information: WTOP-FM: Public file; LMS; WWWT-FM: Public file; LMS
- Webcast: Listen live
- Website: wtop.com

WTOP-FM (103.5 FM) – branded "WTOP Radio" and "WTOP News" – is a commercial all-news radio station licensed to serve Washington, D.C. Owned by Hubbard Broadcasting, the station serves the Washington metropolitan area, extending its reach through repeater station WWWT-FM 107.7 in Manassas, Virginia, as well as the second HD Radio channel of WTLP (103.9 FM) in Braddock Heights, Maryland. The WTOP-FM studios, referred to on-air as the "WTOP Glass-Enclosed Nerve Center", are located on Wisconsin Avenue in the Washington D.C. suburb of Chevy Chase, Maryland, while the station transmitter is located on the American University campus. Besides a standard analog transmission, WTOP-FM broadcasts over three HD Radio channels, and is available online.

WTOP-FM is the successor to the original WTOP, an AM station at 1500 kHz, which held the WTOP call sign from 1943 until 2006, and adopted an all-news format on March 9, 1969.

== Programming ==
All-news radio accounts for all regular programming on WTOP-FM. Presented in an hourly "wheel", this includes ABC News Radio; local news fills the rest of the time, with traffic and weather updates every 10 minutes ("on the 8s"), local business news at 10 and 40 past the hour, and sports news at 25 and 55 past the hour. Weather forecasts are provided by a meteorologist from WJLA-TV, while business news is provided by the Washington Business Journal.

Among the recurring segments on WTOP-FM every week: To Your Health, devoted to health topics and related warnings; Sprawl & Crawl, devoted to road construction updates; Friday Freebies, presenting sales and deals from local stores and businesses; Garden Plot, hosted by Mike McGrath; and Data Doctor's Tech Tips, offers tech advice. WTOP also features two daily commentaries hosted by Chris Core and Clinton Yates.

Two contests air on WTOP: the weekly Mystery Newsmaker Contest, and the daily Winning Word.

== History ==
=== Establishment ===
The station debuted in the late 1940s as WQQW-FM, licensed to Washington, D.C., as a companion to an existing AM station, WQQW in Bethesda, Maryland. In 1951, the two stations changed their call letters to WGMS and WGMS-FM. They operated with a commercial fine arts and classical music format until 2006.

=== WTOP-FM ===
On January 11, 2006, WGMS-FM's call sign was changed to WTOP-FM as the station switched to an all-news format a week prior. The HD Radio digital subchannels of the 103.5 signal originally had broadcast Bonneville International's "iChannel" music format, which features unsigned, independent rock bands on the HD2 channel, and the HD3 channel aired continuous traffic and weather updates. Later iChannel was dropped for a Local marketing agreement (LMA) of the HD2 to a group that aired programming aimed at the South Asian community in the Washington area. Sometime in or before June 2013, that LMA was replaced with the Voice of Russia, the predecessor to what is now Radio Sputnik. As of July 1, 2017, WTOP-HD2 began broadcasting the feed from WFED (1500 AM), after Radio Sputnik moved its Washington DC-area broadcasting to conventional (non-digital) frequency 105.5 MHz.

In 2006, WTOP dropped its long-standing association with The Weather Channel and began airing weather reports exclusively from WJLA-TV all day long. Previously, WTOP had used weather reports from WJLA chief meteorologist Doug Hill during morning and evening rush hours and The Weather Channel all other times. Until 2015, the station used all WJLA meteorologists, not just Doug Hill. WJLA's "Live Super Doppler 7" has been featured in weather reports as necessary.

In 2007, the WTOP radio configuration was realigned once again. WGYS at 103.9 picked up the WTOP simulcast on April 6, 2007, after the adult hits "George 104" simulcast with WXGG (since sold to Radio One) was broken up, and adopted the WTLP calls on July 5, 2007.

Also in 2007, WTOP began broadcasting on WJLA's "Weather Now" digital sub-channel, which is carried on cable systems well beyond WTOP's broadcast area, though this was ended in late July 2009.

In May 2007, WTOP sold the naming rights to its "Glass-Enclosed Nerve Center" (its nickname for its studio) to area business Ledo Pizza. That sponsorship concluded at the end of 2007. Other sponsorship continues, with sportscasts being "fed" by Ledo Pizza.

The former WFED (1050 AM) took over the WTOP call sign on the AM dial and became a simulcast of WTOP, with preemptions for sporting events. On June 13, 2009, the 1050 AM frequency changed to a separate news/talk format, operated by Air America Radio as WZAA. On January 26, 2010, following the shutdown of Air America Radio, WZAA returned to the WTOP simulcast. It took back the WTOP call letters on February 1, 2010. WTOP AM left the simulcast on June 23, 2010, as Bonneville leased the station to United Media Group. United Media changed the call letters to WBQH and flipped to Regional Mexican.

In March 2008, WTOP-FM completed a year-long, $2.5-million state-of-the-art renovation of its newsroom and studios, the first since 1989 when the station moved into the building it presently occupies in northwest Washington.

In 2008, WTOP-FM generated $51.75-million in revenue, the sixth-highest total for any radio station in the United States and the only station not based in New York City or Los Angeles to crack the top ten. In 2009, the station generated $51-million in revenue, good for second among all radio stations in the United States, trailing only KIIS-FM in Los Angeles. In 2010, WTOP generated $57.225-million in revenue, making it tops among radio station in the United States. In 2011 WTOP once again generated more revenue than any other station in the United States, this time with $64 million.

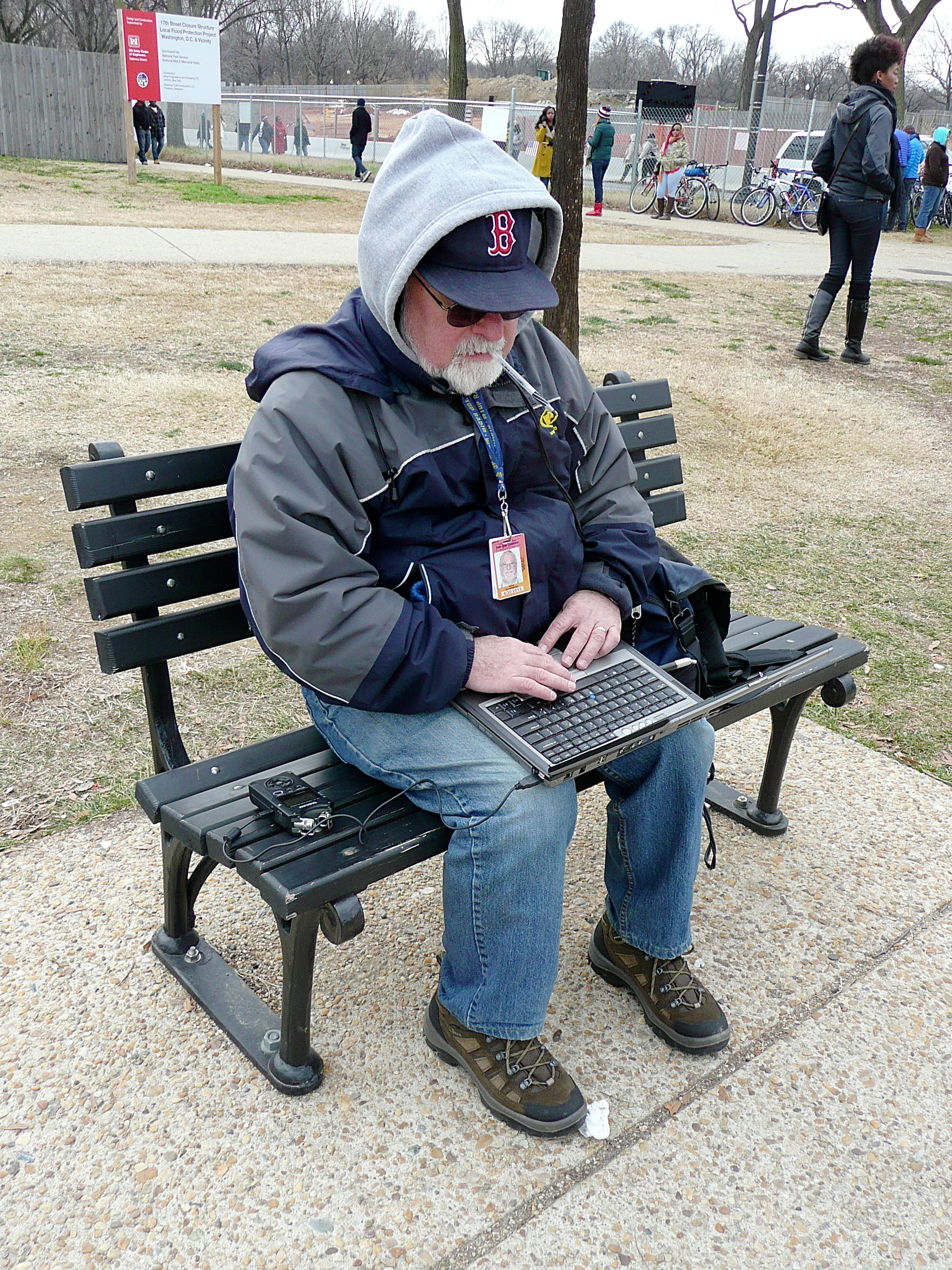
WTOP reporter filing story, Inauguration Day 2013

In 2010, WTOP-FM's coverage of the record Washington-area snowfalls in early February earned it record ratings as the only local media outlet on the air and covering the storm live all day and night. During the week of the storms, which dropped two feet of snow in the area, WTOP had a 16.9% share of the area's radio audience, far exceeding its typical weekly average of around 10%. Consumer research company Arbitron estimated a total of 1.49 million people tuned in at some point during the week, 39% of the total local radio audience of 3.8 million.

Bonneville announced the sale of WTOP-FM, WTLP, and WWWT-FM, as well as 14 other stations, to Hubbard Broadcasting on January 19, 2011.

In 2011, WTOP-FM brought their traffic reporting in-house, ending their relationship with Metro Networks. This meant that Lisa Baden, the longtime "voice of D.C.-area traffic" and a Metro Networks employee, was forced to leave the station in what WTOP's Vice President of News and Programming Jim Farley said was strictly a business decision. Farley said WTOP tried to bring Baden and other Metro Networks employees to WTOP, but they have clauses in their contracts prohibiting them from working for competitors for one year. Baden said she was "devastated". Shortly after that, Baden joined rival radio station WMAL.

In 2015, WTOP began airing weather reports and using meteorologists exclusively from WRC-TV all day long. The partnership ended in March 2023, as WRC underwent major changes, and just months after some longtime WTOP personalities accepted corporate buyouts from WTOP's parent company. The station then returned to using WJLA-TV meteorologists for their weather reports.

On January 1, 2018, WTOP-FM switched from CBS to ABC for its top-of-the-hour newscasts, pausing a relationship with CBS that, as noted above, dated to the late 1920s. WTOP-FM rejoined CBS exactly two years later. In May 2026 with the shutdown of CBS Radio News WTOP-FM switched back to ABC.

On July 29, 2026, Hubbard announced a local marketing agreement to lease WTLP to the Educational Media Foundation, which flipped the station to its contemporary Christian music K-Love network on August 1. Station management stated that the main station's good coverage of Frederick County and the advent of streaming lessened the need to retain a simulcast in that area.

== Translators and HD Radio ==
The HD2 subchannels of both stations relay the programming of WFED (1500 AM). WTOP-FM-HD2 feeds one FM translator, which cannot originate programming on their own:

Broadcast translator for WTOP-FM-HD2
Call sign	Frequency	City of license	FID	ERP (W)	HAAT	Class	Transmitter coordinates	FCC info	Notes
W288BS	105.5 FM	Reston, Virginia	140589	99	188 m (617 ft)	D	38°57′50.4″N 77°6′16.9″W (NAD27)	LMS	Owned by Reston Translator, LLC

The HD3 subchannels of both stations air a freeform music format branded as "The Gamut", which is also simulcast on WSHE (820 AM digital, Frederick, Maryland), WHFS (1050 AM), and one translator:

Broadcast translator for WTOP-FM-HD3
Call sign	Frequency	City of license	FID	ERP (W)	HAAT	Class	Transmitter coordinates	FCC info	Notes
W252DC	98.3 FM	Reston, Virginia	138737	150	79 m (259 ft)	D	38°53′45.4″N 77°08′6.9″W	LMS	Owned by Reston Translator, LLC

WTOP-FM-HD4 simulcasts Cortona Media's WYRE (810 AM, Annapolis, Maryland), which broadcasts an adult album alternative format. It feeds Hubbard-owned translator W228DI, which Cortona is also leasing.

Broadcast translator for WTOP-FM-HD4
Call sign	Frequency	City of license	FID	ERP (W)	HAAT	Class	Transmitter coordinates	FCC info
W228DI	93.5 FM	Silver Spring, Maryland	138906	130	88 m (289 ft)	D	39°2′32″N 77°2′49″W	LMS

WWWT-FM's HD4 subchannel is leased by Metro Radio and airs a Bollywood music format branded "Intense FM". Metro uses the HD subchannel to feed their translator W275BO.

Broadcast translator for WWWT-FM-HD4
Call sign	Frequency	City of license	FID	ERP (W)	HAAT	Class	Transmitter coordinates	FCC info	Notes
W275BO	102.9 FM	Reston, Virginia	142771	50	102 m (335 ft)	D	38°56′56.6″N 77°21′18.1″W (NAD27)	LMS	Owned by Metro Radio, Inc.

WWWT-FM's HD5 subchannel is also leased by Metro Radio and simulcasts WKDV (1460 AM), which airs a regional Mexican music format, in order to feed translator W292BC. This is believed by station engineer Dave Kolesar and HD Radio manufacturer Xperi to be the first-ever HD5 subchannel and cannot be received by all HD Radios.

Broadcast translator for WWWT-FM-HD5
Call sign	Frequency	City of license	FID	ERP (W)	HAAT	Class	Transmitter coordinates	FCC info	Notes
W292BC	106.3 FM	Gainesville, Virginia	147997	80	123 m (404 ft)	D	38°51′17.9″N 77°22′26.9″W (NAD27)	LMS	Owned by Metro Radio, Inc.

== Ratings ==
In July 2009, WTOP was ranked #1 in the Arbitron ratings among radio stations in the Washington area.

In November 25, 2014, WTOP was #1 in Washington, DC according to Arbitron.

In 2025, WTOP was consistently second in the Nielsen ratings, behind main News/Talk competitor WAMU.

== Awards ==
- 2002 RTNDA Edward R. Murrow Award (National) for Best Large Market Radio News Website
- 2003 RTNDA Edward R. Murrow Award (National) for Best Large Market Radio News Website
- 2003 RTNDA Edward R. Murrow Award (National) for Best Radio Large Market Spot News Coverage - "Serial Sniper"
- 2006 RTNDA Edward R. Murrow Award (National) for Best Radio Large Market Feature Reporting - "Scary Clown"
- 2006 RTNDA Edward R. Murrow Award (National) for Best Radio Large Market Spot News Coverage - "Capital Chaos"
- 2008 RTNDA Edward R. Murrow Award (National) for Best Large Market Radio News Website
- 2009 RTNDA Edward R. Murrow Award (National) for Best Radio Large Market Feature Hard News - "Hidden Hunter"
- 2009 RTNDA Edward R. Murrow Award (National) for Best Radio Large Market Use of Sound - "Cathedral Bells"
- 2009 RTNDA Edward R. Murrow Award (National) for Best Radio Large Market Writing - "Core Values"
- 2009 RTNDA Edward R. Murrow Award (National) for Best Large Market Radio News Website
- 2009 RTNDA Edward R. Murrow Award (National) for Large Market Radio News Overall Excellence
- 2010 National Association of Broadcasters Marconi Award for Major Market Station of the Year
- 2011 RTNDA Edward R. Murrow Award (National) for Large Market Radio News Overall Excellence
- 2014 RTDNA Edward R. Murrow Award (National) for Large Market Breaking News Coverage
- 2017 RTNDA Edward R. Murrow Award (National) for Large Market Radio News Overall Excellence
- 2017 RTDNA Edward R. Murrow Award (National) for Best Large Market Radio News Website
- 2018 RTDNA Edward R. Murrow Award (National) for Large Market Radio News Overall Excellence
- 2019 RTNDA Edward R. Murrow Award (National) for Large Market Radio News Overall Excellence

== See also ==
- WDCH-FM
