= WHFS =

Simulcasts WSHE Frederick
- Silver Spring, Maryland; United States
- Broadcast area: Washington, D.C.; Baltimore; Southern Maryland
- Frequency: 1050 kHz (HD Radio)
- Branding: The Gamut

Programming
- Format: Freeform

Ownership
- Owner: Hubbard Broadcasting; (Washington DC FCC License Sub, LLC)
- Sister stations: WFED; WSHE; WTOP-FM

History
- First air date: December 7, 1946
- Former call signs: WGAY (1946–1960); WQMR (1960–1971); WGAY (1971–1984); WNTR (1984–1993); WKDL (1993–2000); WPLC (2000–2004); WFED (2004–2008); WTOP (2008–2009); WZAA (2009–2010); WTOP (2010); WBQH (2010–2026)
- Call sign meaning: Hi-fi station (from original FM station)

Technical information
- Licensing authority: FCC
- Facility ID: 8673
- Class: D
- Power: 2,000 watts (day); 500 watts (6:00 a.m. to sunrise); 41 watts (night)
- Transmitter coordinates: 39°2′31.4″N 77°2′45.9″W

Links
- Public license information: Public file; LMS

WHFS (1050 AM) is a radio broadcasting station in the Washington, D.C. region, licensed to Silver Spring, Maryland. It broadcasts the freeform music format, known as "The Gamut", originating at WSHE. It is owned and operated by Hubbard Broadcasting.

WHFS broadcasts non-directionally from the WFED transmitter site in Wheaton, Maryland. By day its power is 2,000 watts. Because 1050 AM is a Mexican clear channel frequency reserved for XEG in Monterrey, WHFS reduces power to 41 watts at night to prevent interference. It also possesses pre-sunrise authorization for 500 watts from 6:00 a.m. to sunrise.

== History ==
The station signed on December 7, 1946, as WGAY, airing a beautiful music format. The meaning of the call sign is unclear; one often-repeated claim is that WGAY was named for one-time owner Connie B. Gay, though Gay did not purchase the station until 1959. A second story purports that the station initially broadcast government job openings as part of its programming, and that WGAY stood for "Government And You". A third explanation is simply that "beautiful music" connoted a "bright and gay" happy sound.

The original owners and operators, Ed Winton and Bob Chandler, are credited with creating the beautiful music format, which was mostly instrumental music, with orchestral covers of showtunes, soundtrack excerpts, and standard popular songs. Chandler was known to arrange for recording of music that he did not have in the station's library. In addition, on Sunday afternoons at 1:00 p.m., Matinee at One played a complete Broadway show soundtrack with an explanation of the plot.

Despite its sobriquet of "elevator music", WGAY was popular, and was soon sold to Connie B. Gay. On February 1, 1960, the WGAY calls were moved to the FM band at 99.5 MHz, while the AM station became WQMR, for "Washington's Quality Music Radio". WGAY initially operated as an experimental country music station (Gay was a country and western music promoter) but started simulcasting WQMR full-time around 1961.

These simulcasts would usually end nightly at sunset when WQMR had to sign off as required by the Federal Communications Commission, and WGAY was rarely mentioned on the air or in advertisements. WQMR soon increased in power from 1,000 watts on the AM band, while WGAY would upgrade from 20 kW to a 50 kW stereo signal. Both WQMR and WGAY moved to the World Building, located on Georgia Avenue, just north of the intersection of Maryland Route 410 (East-West-Highway) in Silver Spring, in 1966.

This simulcast arrangement continued well into the 1980s, as WQMR reverted to WGAY. Winton and Chandler sold the station on September 1, 1984, to Greater Media, which in turn ended the simulcast with WGAY-FM and changed the call sign to WNTR. Greater Media subsequently bought WRC (980 AM) from NBC Radio and sold WNTR to TM Productions.

Later, WNTR was sold to Pat Robertson, the televangelist and founder of the Christian Broadcasting Network, who used WNTR as the anchor of a conservative talk radio network dubbed "The News Talk Radio Network". WNTR was also the first station to carry Rush Limbaugh in Washington, before he moved to WMAL (630 AM). This ended when the World Building studios caught on fire. However, Robertson's company continued to run the station from another building in Silver Spring for a time, initially as part of his network and later in a brokered programming format. In March 1993, it became one of two Washington, DC area affiliates of the Radio AAHS network for children.

As Radio AAHS, the station's call sign became WKDL (in a simulcast with WKDV in Manassas, Virginia). The concept was not successful at the time, and Metro Radio then bought the station, and switched WKDL to a Spanish language CHR format in December 1997. When that did not succeed, it briefly carried first the Genesis Radio Network of conservative talk, and then a business radio format under the WPLC callsign. Bonneville International bought the station in 2004, at which point the station became WFED, carrying "Federal News Radio", a news/talk format oriented to government employees that Bonneville had launched as an Internet-only station on February 22, 2000.

Initially, WFED aired the Associated Press' All News Radio service during the overnight hours, as a complement to Bonneville's main all-news station, WTOP. When AP All News Radio was terminated, the station began an affiliation with CNN Headline News, which itself was phased out in 2007 by provider Westwood One. In November 2007, the 1050 frequency increased its daytime power from 1 kW to 3.5 kW to better reach the government office workers in Washington, D.C. who comprise Federal News Radio's core audience.

In August 2008, WFED was moved to 1500 AM, following the discontinuation of that frequency's previous occupant, WWWT. This move significantly improved WFED's daytime and nighttime coverage. While the 1500 facility is a 50,000-watt clear channel station, 1050 must power down to 44 watts at night, effectively limiting its nighttime coverage to Prince George's County.

After a month-long transition period, 1050 was switched to a simulcast of WTOP-FM, under the WTOP call sign. From June 17, 2009, until January 25, 2010, the station aired a news, talk and information format, mostly provided by Air America, which leased the station from Bonneville; the call sign was then changed to WZAA. Air America announced its closure and ended live programming on January 21, 2010, and went off-the-air on January 25; as a result, WZAA reverted to the WTOP-FM simulcast, and changed its call sign back to WTOP on February 1. That June, the simulcast again ceased, and 1050 was leased out to United Media Group, who launched a regional Mexican format, "La Mera Mera", under the WBQH call sign.

Bonneville announced the sale of WBQH, as well as 16 other stations, to Hubbard Broadcasting on January 19, 2011. The sale was completed on April 29, 2011.

WBQH, along with WTTZ-LP, agreed on May 16, 2022, to broadcast Baltimore Ravens games in Spanish beginning with the upcoming season.

On September 1, 2025, La Mera Mera announced on social media that it was ceasing operations effective immediately. Hubbard switched WBQH to a simulcast of "The Gamut", a freeform music format originating on WSHE. With the lease of WBQH's former paired FM translator, W228DI (93.5 FM, Silver Spring), on March 1, 2026, The Gamut announced it would continue broadcasting over the station. It also switched to hybrid HD Radio for better sound quality. On April 1, 2026, WBQH's callsign was changed to WHFS in homage to the longtime Washington-area alternative rock station.
