= Braddock Heights, Maryland =

- Census-designated place
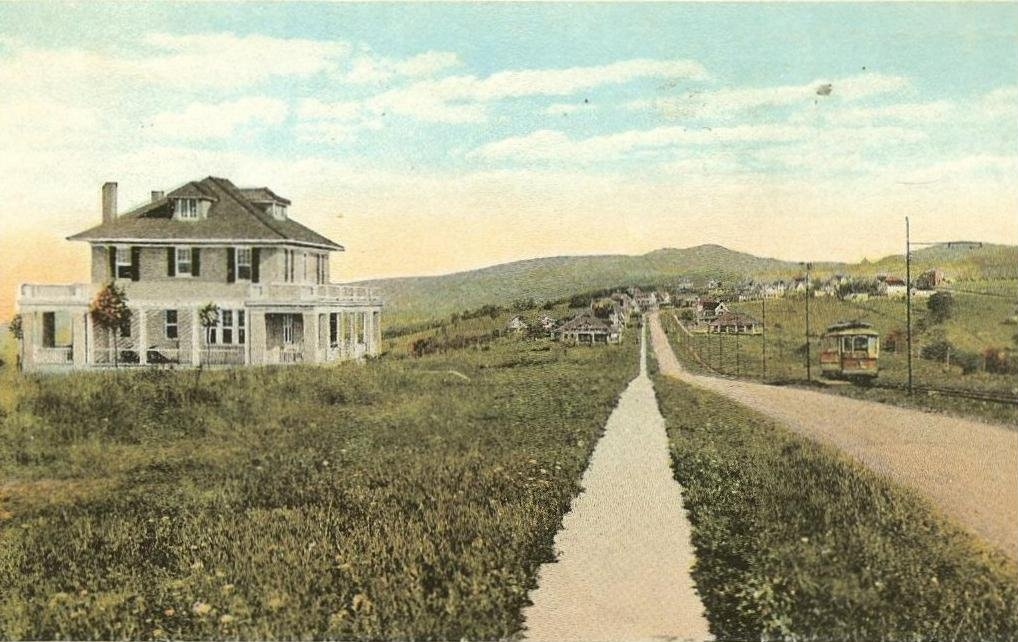
- Jefferson Boulevard with a H&F Railway trolley

- Location of Braddock Heights in Maryland
- Coordinates: 39°24′32″N 77°30′12″W
- Country: United States
- State: Maryland
- County: Frederick

Area
  - Total: 5.35 sq mi (13.85 km^{2})
  - Land: 5.34 sq mi (13.82 km^{2})
  - Water: 0.012 sq mi (0.03 km^{2})
- Elevation: 656 ft (200 m)

Population (2020)
  - Total: 3,075
  - Density: 576/sq mi (222.5/km^{2})
- Time zone: UTC−5 (Eastern (EST))
  - Summer (DST): UTC−4 (EDT)
- ZIP Code: 21703
- Area codes: 301, 240
- FIPS code: 24-09100
- GNIS feature ID: 2389228

Braddock Heights is an unincorporated community and census-designated place (CDP) in Frederick County, Maryland, United States. The population was 2,608 at the 2010 census. The local ZIP codes are 21714 (post office boxes only) and 21703.

== History ==
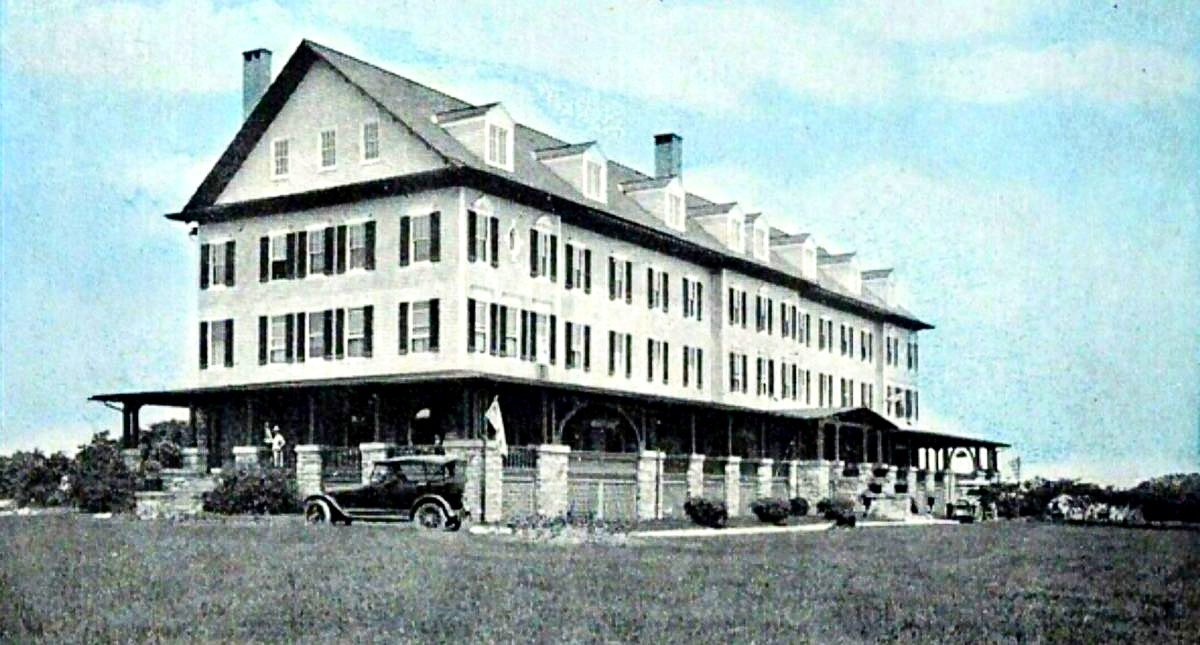
Postcard of the Braddock Hotel c. 1915

Braddock Heights is located at an elevation of 950 feet (290 m) atop Braddock Mountain (as Catoctin Mountain is locally known) near the pass at Braddock Springs, so named after British General Edward Braddock and Lt. Colonel George Washington's use of the mountain pass on their way to Fort Duquesne during the French and Indian War on April 29, 1755. During the Civil War, Braddock Heights was the site of a minor cavalry battle between generals J.E.B. Stuart (CSA) and Alfred Pleasonton (USA) on September 13, 1862; it was at that time known as "Fairview Pass". One mile east of Braddock Heights, near the base of Braddock Mountain, are the older communities of Clifton and Old Braddock.

The picturesque view of the city of Frederick from Old Braddock, also known as "Fairview", elevation 550 feet (170 m), was the inspiration for Oliver Wendell Holmes Sr. to record in his 1862 journal:

In approaching Frederick the singular beauty of its clustered spires struck me very much, so that I was not surprised to find Fair View laid down about this point on a railroad map. I wish some wandering photographer would take a picture of the place, a stereoscopic one, if possible, to show how gracefully, how charmingly, its group of steeples nestles among the Maryland hills. The town has a poetical look from a distance, as if seers and dreamers might dwell there.

This journal entry was in turn an inspiration for Holmes' close friend John Greenleaf Whittier when composing the famous Civil War poem Barbara Fritchie.

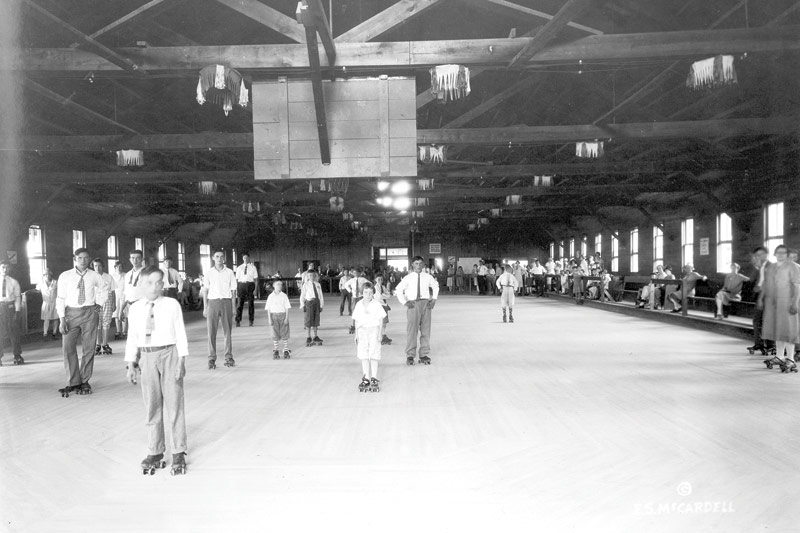
Braddock Heights Roller Rink c. 1930

Braddock Pass is near the locations at which Interstate 70 and the National Pike (U.S. Route 40) cross Catoctin Mountain. Braddock Heights was founded in 1896 by George William Smith as a summer resort community that eventually included several hotels, a community pool, a wooden-floor skating rink, an amusement park, scenic overlooks, nature trails, and until 1980, a small ski resort. Braddock Heights has been host to many national political figures, including Oliver Wendell Holmes Sr., Edwin Warfield, President Franklin D. Roosevelt, Earl Warren, Ethel Kennedy, and (then) Senator Richard Nixon.

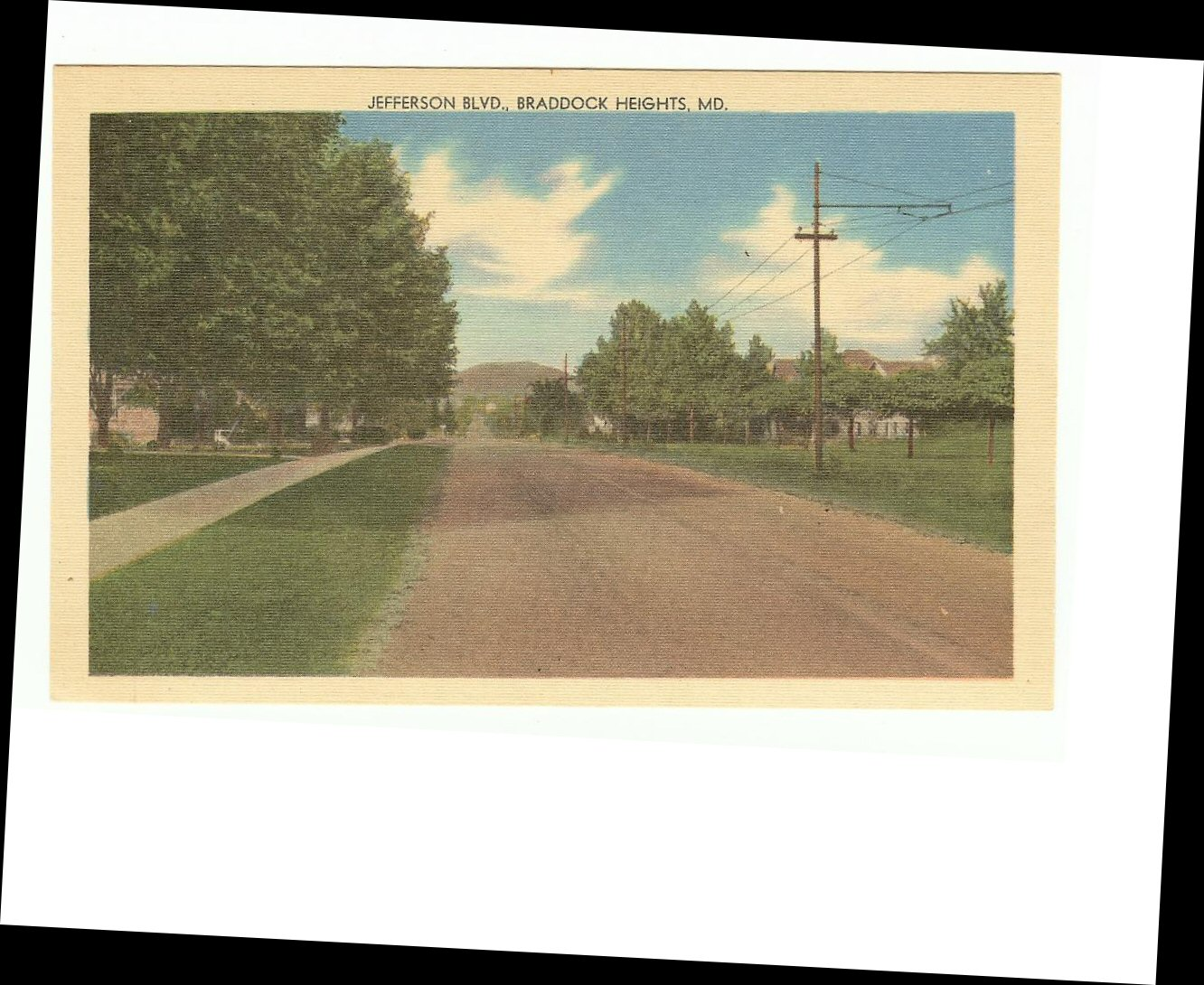
Jefferson Blvd looking south, pre-1923

Braddock Heights was one of the first modern planned communities in the United States, and custom housing development has continued since 1901. Braddock Heights is now known for its eclectic houses and its views of Frederick and the Monocacy and Middletown valleys. Following the end of World War II, and the decline of the amusement park, Braddock Heights' demographic changed from commercial summer boarding houses to that of an unincorporated community with permanent residents.

Braddock Heights, similar to the other Maryland cottage parks of Pen Mar and Glen Echo, has evolved into an artisans' community. The Braddock Heights Community Association and the Braddock Heights Historical Society continue to maintain and hold public events at Braddock Heights Park.

Braddock Heights was once home to the oldest roller rink in the United States, the Stargaze Skateway. The roller rink was restored in 1987, however, it burned to the ground as the result of arson on August 19, 1998.

Braddock Heights is said to be the roost of the Snallygaster, a chimeric bird-like creature claimed to be responsible for the disappearance of livestock, and the occasional Middletown Valley resident, since the mid-18th century.

=== Hagerstown & Frederick Railway ===
Tracks along Jefferson Blvd, looking south from Maryland Ave.

The Hagerstown & Frederick Railway, a suburban and interurban trolley system, was developed by George William Smith and initially called the Frederick and Middletown Railway. Service between Frederick and Braddock Heights commenced on August 22, 1896. The Jefferson branch was added in 1906, running down the east side of Jefferson Boulevard. The right of way is still visible as a strip between the set-back sidewalk and the street.

Service to Jefferson lasted until 1940, although a short section was kept open to serve the Vindobona Hotel. Service to Braddock Heights and Middletown from Frederick was finally discontinued on September 30, 1947.

== Geography ==
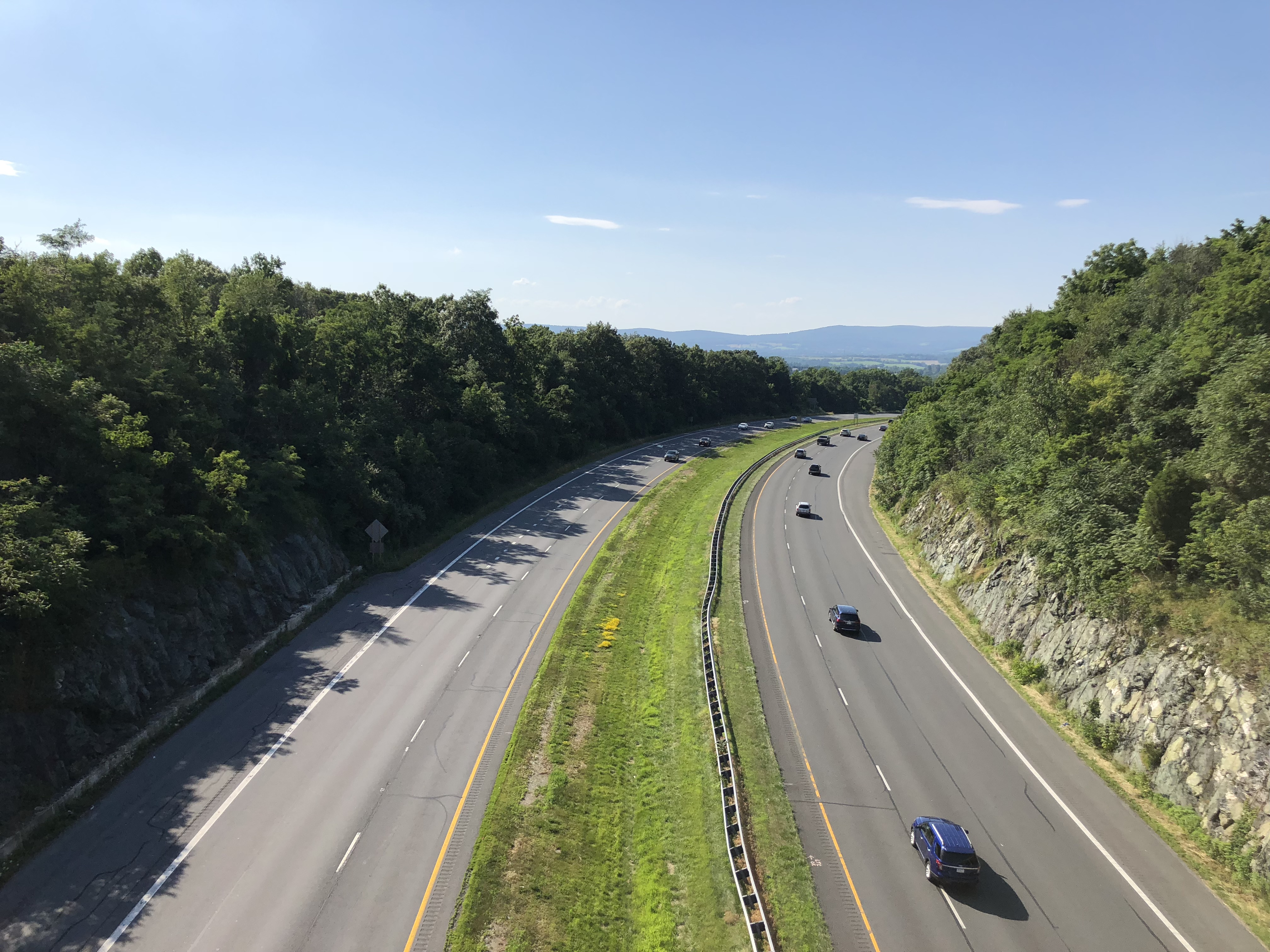
Interstate 70 in Braddock Heights

Braddock Heights is located in west-central Frederick County along the ridgecrest of Catoctin Mountain, known locally as "Braddock Mountain". U.S. Route 40 Alternate crosses the mountain near the center of the community, leading east 5 miles (8 km) to Frederick and west 2.5 miles (4.0 km) to Middletown. Interstate 70 crosses the northern part of the CDP, with access from partial Exit 49 (U.S. Route 40 Alt.) at the east base of the mountain. U.S. Route 40 forms the northern edge of the CDP.

According to the United States Census Bureau, the Braddock Heights CDP has a total area of 4.7 square miles (12.2 km^{2}), of which 0.01 square miles (0.03 km^{2}), or 0.23%, is water.

== Demographics ==
Historical population
Census	Pop.	Note	%±
2000	4,627		—
2010	2,608		−43.6%
2020	3,075		17.9%
U.S. Decennial Census

=== 2020 census ===
As of the 2020 census, Braddock Heights had a population of 3,075. The median age was 48.3 years. 18.6% of residents were under the age of 18 and 23.1% of residents were 65 years of age or older. For every 100 females there were 100.8 males, and for every 100 females age 18 and over there were 101.9 males age 18 and over.

89.9% of residents lived in urban areas, while 10.1% lived in rural areas.

There were 1,186 households in Braddock Heights, of which 25.5% had children under the age of 18 living in them. Of all households, 62.4% were married-couple households, 13.9% were households with a male householder and no spouse or partner present, and 18.9% were households with a female householder and no spouse or partner present. About 20.5% of all households were made up of individuals and 9.7% had someone living alone who was 65 years of age or older.

There were 1,259 housing units, of which 5.8% were vacant. The homeowner vacancy rate was 1.3% and the rental vacancy rate was 8.4%.

Racial composition as of the 2020 census
Race	Number	Percent
White	2,644	86.0%
Black or African American	76	2.5%
American Indian and Alaska Native	10	0.3%
Asian	63	2.0%
Native Hawaiian and Other Pacific Islander	0	0.0%
Some other race	102	3.3%
Two or more races	180	5.9%
Hispanic or Latino (of any race)	231	7.5%

=== 2000 census ===
As of the census of 2000, there were 4,627 people, 1,684 households, and 1,343 families residing in the CDP. The population density was 626.6 inhabitants per square mile (241.9/km^{2}). There were 1,733 housing units at an average density of 234.7 per square mile (90.6/km^{2}). The racial makeup of the CDP was 96.17% White, 1.19% African American, 1.02% Asian, 0.02% Pacific Islander, 0.35% from other races, and 1.25% from two or more races. Hispanic or Latino of any race were 1.73% of the population.

There were 1,684 households, out of which 35.9% had children under the age of 18 living with them, 69.9% were married couples living together, 7.1% had a female householder with no husband present, and 20.2% were non-families. 15.0% of all households were made up of individuals, and 5.1% had someone living alone who was 65 years of age or older. The average household size was 2.71 and the average family size was 3.03.

In the CDP, the population was spread out, with 25.0% under the age of 18, 5.7% from 18 to 24, 26.9% from 25 to 44, 31.8% from 45 to 64, and 10.6% who were 65 years of age or older. The median age was 41 years. For every 100 females, there were 98.0 males. For every 100 females age 18 and over, there were 96.7 males.

The median income for a household in the CDP was $71,932, and the median income for a family was $78,779. Males had a median income of $52,179 versus $38,063 for females. The per capita income for the CDP was $29,621. About 1.0% of families and 2.2% of the population were below the poverty line, including none of those under age 18 and 2.4% of those age 65 or over.

== Education ==
Braddock Heights is part of the Frederick County Public Schools.

School zoning is as follows: Elementary schools with portions of the CDP in their attendance boundaries include Butterfly Ridge Elementary School, Carroll Manor Elementary School, Middletown Primary School and Elementary School, and Myersville Elementary School. Middle schools with sections of the CDP include Ballenger Creek Middle School, Crestwood Middle School, and Middletown Middle School. High schools with portions of the CDP include Frederick High School, Middletown High School, and Tuscarora High School.
