= Tedi Thurman =

American actress (1923–2012)

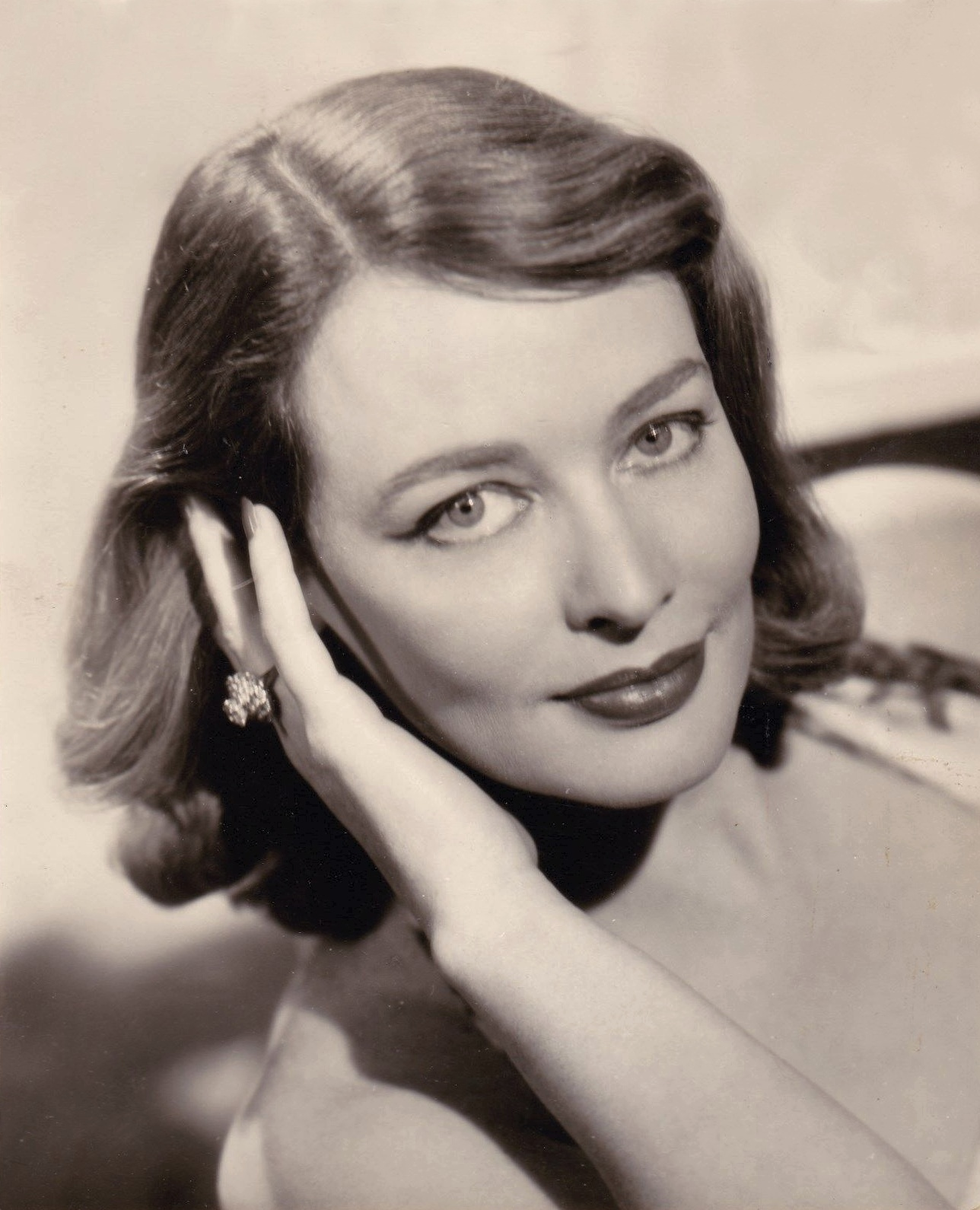
- Thurman, c. 1950s
- Born: Dorothy Ruth Thurman; June 23, 1923; Midville, Georgia, U.S.
- Died: September 17, 2012 (aged 89); Palm Springs, California, U.S.
- Other names: Miss Monitor
- Occupation(s): Actress, model, radio announcer

Theodora "Tedi" Thurman (born Dorothy Ruth Thurman; June 23, 1923 – September 17, 2012) was an American fashion model and actress who found fame in the 1950s as Miss Monitor on NBC's Monitor, a 40-hour weekend radio show developed by Pat Weaver.

Born in Midville, Georgia, the daughter of a banker, Thurman originally planned to become a painter, studying at the Corcoran Institute in Washington, D. C. Her career plans changed, and she went to New York for modeling. Her first shoot wound up as a Vogue cover, bringing with it many other modeling jobs and some work on television soap operas. Columnist Alice Hughes described her appearance:

She's 5-feet-7, weight 115, sea-blue eyes, long loosely combed red hair and a 33-21-33 figure. Ingredients like hers can turn the morning dew into a monsoon.

She had film offers, but only one role, in the z-grade 1954 Ed Wood movie, Jail Bait. In 1954, Leopold Stokowski needed an accomplished jew's harpist for a performance of Charles Ives' symphony, New England Holidays. Thurman was one of the 22 who auditioned, but she lost the gig to two professional musicians.

== Miss Monitor ==
Thurman, who lived in Palm Springs, California, until her death on September 17, 2012, became one of the most familiar radio voices of the late 1950s in her role as Miss Monitor. Jack Gould, writing in The New York Times, described her as someone who "made the [weather] report sound like an irresistible invitation to an unforgettable evening."

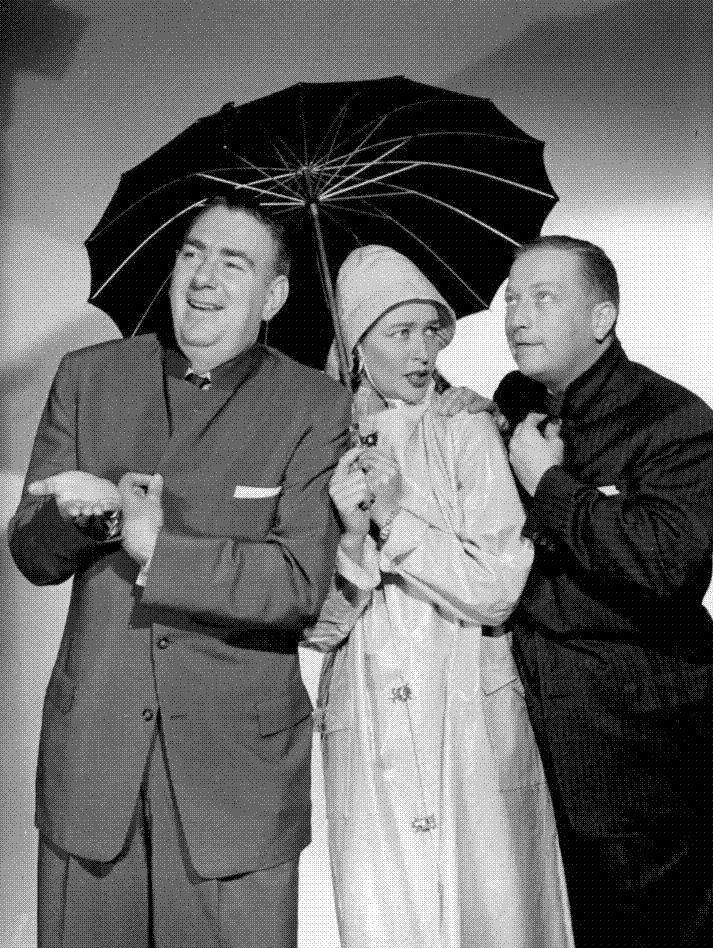
Thurman with Bob and Ray in a Monitor publicity photo.

It began during a modeling assignment on the Today show, where she caught the eye and ear of one of the producers who was part of the Monitor planning team. With her alluring, breathy delivery heard against a background of lush, romantic music, Thurman gave NBC's sexy weekend weather reports from 1955 until 1961. While Bob and Ray stayed at NBC all weekend to spontaneously go on the air in case of technical problems with scheduled remotes, Thurman was there throughout the weekend to do her hourly weather reports. Dennis Hart, the author of Monitor: The Last Great Radio Show (2002), recalled:

Tedi Thurman, she was an actress, she had done a little bit of radio, she had done some television, but she was a model. And it was Weaver who came up with the idea of doing weather in a way it had never been done before. She would come into the studios and be there virtually every hour of the 40-hour weekend with just a few breaks, and she would do weather with this lush music behind her. To say the least, Miss Monitor probably became the most recognizable female voice in the country within a few short months after she went on Monitor.

When Miss Monitor delivered weather forecasts for cities across the country, her forecasts were all real, except for one occasion when Henry Morgan set Thurman's script on fire. She had to complete the segment by making up temperatures for each city. In the mid-1950s, she was lampooned by Edie Adams on various shows hosted by Ernie Kovacs. Bob and Ray also did a Miss Monitor satire, as did The Joy Boys, Willard Scott and Ed Walker in Washington, DC, referring to "Miss Janitor."

== Television and films ==
In 1957, Thurman appeared with Jack Paar on The Tonight Show, and TV Guide did a feature article, "Tedi Thurman: Weathergirl Supreme" that year. She also can be seen as Miss Monitor in the trailer for the movie Ten Thousand Bedrooms (1957). Sammy Davis Jr., hired Thurman to introduce him when he played Harrah's, Lake Tahoe, in April 1961. In "Fair-Weather Friends", Time (April 12, 1968) remembered Thurman:

Just about every TV station in the nation has its own weatherman nowadays, but the trouble with a great number of them is that they are cloudy and mostly windy. In the beginning, weathermen talked so much about 'occluded fronts' and 'thermal inversions' that viewers wondered if they shouldn't start building an ark in the backyard. Then came the era of fair-weather girls. Preoccupied with their own frontal systems, they postured before the weather maps in the latest gowns and spun out sultry spiels. NBCs Tedi Thurman used to peek from behind a shower curtain to coo: 'The temperature in New York is 46, and me, I'm 36-26-36.'

Thurman was interviewed about her life on Fire Island for Crayton Robey's documentary film When Ocean Meets Sky (2003). Edge editor Steve Weinstein, reviewing the film June 4, 2006, noted:

Robey traveled to Palm Springs to interview Tedi Thurman, the campy weather girl of Jack Paar’s "Tonight Show”, who had a stormy longtime relationship with Peggy Fears. Fears, a former Broadway vocalist and producer, built the original Yacht Club and the cinderblock hotel that still stands today, Ciel being its most recent incarnation.

On Wednesday, July 14, 2004, 29 years after Monitor ended on NBC Radio; Thurman joined more than 40 former Monitor staff members who gathered in midtown Manhattan for the first Monitor reunion at Hurley's Tavern, a location made famous through many references on the Paar Tonight Show. The event was organized by Dennis Hart, author of Monitor (Take 2). The book features an introduction by Thurman.

== Death ==
On September 17, 2012, Thurman died in her sleep at age 89 in Palm Springs, California.

== Listen to ==
- Miss Monitor (Tedi Thurman) (RealAudio)
- Miss Monitor on NPR (6/5/05)
- "Miss Janitor," the Joy Boys' parody of Miss Monitor (February 10, 1961) (MP3)
