= Bryson Rash =

American journalist (1913–1992)

- Bryson Rash with NBC in 1961
- Born: Bryson Brennan Rash; August 18, 1913; Los Angeles, California, U.S.
- Died: November 12, 1992 (aged 79); Washington, D.C., U.S.
- Occupation: Television news anchor
- Spouse: Julie Rash (m. 1940)

Bryson Brennan Rash (August 18, 1913 – November 10, 1992) was an American journalist who reported on radio and television for CBS, NBC, and ABC affiliates. He was ABC's White House correspondent from 1942 through 1956, thereafter reporting from Washington for the NBC network for the next twenty years.

== Career ==
Rash was born in Los Angeles, California, and raised in St. Louis, Missouri. His first job in radio was voicing Buster Brown on KMOX at the age of 12. After his voice changed, he lost the role.

Rash graduated from Washington University in St. Louis, and earned a Juris Doctor from American University. He became an announcer for KWK and KMOX in St. Louis, and then worked for WLW in Cincinnati in 1936. After a month at WLW, CBS hired Rash as an announcer for WJSV in Washington, D.C. He also performed broadcasts for the Federal Housing Administration.

NBC hired Rash in 1937. In 1939, he was a member of the first mobile television unit in the nation during an experimental broadcast from the National Mall at the United States Department of Agriculture. He also covered the 1939 British royal visit.

Following the split of ABC from NBC, Rash became ABC's White House reporter in 1942; he held the role until 1956. Broadcasting for WMAL-AM, he conducted a radio report broadcast nationwide from the opening of the United Nations in San Francisco in 1945, and helped to convince President Harry S. Truman to make the first televised Oval Office address in October 1947. In 1951, Rash did the first nationwide television broadcast for the signing ceremony for the Treaty of San Francisco. He covered the Army–McCarthy hearings in 1954 and the nuclear testing at Bikini Atoll in 1956.

Rash returned to NBC in 1957, working at WRC-TV, the network's owned-and-operated station in Washington, where he did both local newscasts and network radio and television reports. In 1963, he covered the state funeral of John F. Kennedy and March on Washington. He was also elected president of the National Press Club that year. He won Emmy Awards for public service in 1963 and 1973, and won a Peabody Award for his reporting on District of Columbia home rule. He was also inducted into the "Journalism Hall of Fame" of Sigma Delta Chi, the Society of Professional Journalists. Rash was acclaimed for his fairness and objectivity, said The Washington Post upon his death, citing a New Yorker magazine cartoon in which two men argue over him, "he's not a Nixon man, but then he wasn't a Johnson man, a Kennedy man, an Eisenhower man, a Truman man or a Roosevelt man, either".

Rash retired from NBC in 1977, and continued to work as an independent journalist. He hosted programs on WETA-TV, winning a local Emmy Award in 1988. A roast of Rash when he became president of the National Press Club, by WRC-TV colleagues Willard Scott and Ed Walker of Joy Boys fame, was released on a CD, Is Bryson Rash?.

== Personal life ==
Rash met his wife, Julie, in 1937. They married in 1940 and had two children. He died from emphysema at his home in Washington, D.C.

== Bibliography ==
- Rash, Bryson (1983). Footnote Washington: Tracking the Engaging, Humorous, and Surprising Bypaths of Capital History. EPM Publications. ISBN 0-914440-62-4.
