= WARL =

WARL may refer to:

- Western Australian Rugby League, a rugby league in the state of Western Australia mainly the Perth metropolitan competition

== Radio stations ==
- WARA (AM), a radio station (1320 AM) licensed to Attleboro, Massachusetts, United States, which used the call sign WARL from 2000 to 2014
- WAVA (AM), a radio station (780 AM) licensed to Arlington, Virginia, United States, which used the call sign WARL from 1946 to 1961
- WAVA-FM, a radio station (105.1 FM) licensed to Arlington, Virginia, United States, which used the call sign WARL-FM from 1948 to 1961
