= The Billboard March =

The Billboard March
Played by the U.S. Air Force Band in 1998

"The Billboard March" is a circus march written in 1901 by John N. Klohr, and dedicated to the Billboard music-industry magazine. Its tune is widely known among Americans, and it has been repeatedly used in mass media, even though its title is little known.

The major theme of its last half lends itself to songs. A relatively early "G-rated" set of lyrics for it was heard from engineers who had been students at Capitol Radio Electronics Institute by Willard Scott and Ed Walker, the stars of what became The Joy Boys radio program at WRC-AM in Washington, D.C. in the 1950s. They recorded it in two versions (a duet between them, and Walker singing in four-part harmony with himself), for use as, respectively, the opening and closing themes for the show:

We are the joy boys of radio;
We chase electrons to and fro-o-o.
We are the joy boys of radio;
We chase electrons to and fro.

That version was adapted into one sung and whistled by the drugged naval captain in the 1964 film Ensign Pulver.

The march was used over the main title credits in the film Everything's Rosie (1931 RKO film).

The 2004 film The Stepford Wives used the march.

The tune is a popular campfire song for children in summer camps, set as a knock-knock joke, and using the lyrics: "Bring back the billboard, upon the hill. Because that billboard gave me such a thrill. When I was younger, and just a child, that sexy billboard drove me wi-i-ld"

The same song tune is used for a group of rowdy songs that share the line

I love a gang bang [or "gangbang"]

followed by a line beginning either "I always ..." or "Oh yes I ...".
