= WPRZ =

WPRZ may refer to:

- WPRZ-FM, a radio station (88.1 FM) licensed to Brandy Station, Virginia, United States.
- WKYF, a radio station (92.1 FM) licensed to Fredonia, Kentucky, United States, which was known as WPRZ-FM from 2008 to 2010.
- WRCW, a radio station (1250 AM) licensed to Warrenton, Virginia, United States, which was known as WPRZ from 1982 to 2007.
- WKTA, a radio station (1330 AM) licensed to Evanston, Illinois, United States, which was known as WPRZ from 1979 to 1981.
