= WAVA =

WAVA may refer to:

- WAVA (AM), a radio station (780 AM) licensed to serve Arlington, Virginia, United States
- WAVA-FM, a radio station (105.1 FM) licensed to serve Arlington, Virginia
- World Association of Veteran Athletes, the former name of World Masters Athletics
