= WKDL =

WKDL may refer to:

- WKDL (FM), a radio station (104.9 FM) licensed to Brockport, New York, United States
- WBQH, a radio station (1050 AM) licensed to Silver Spring, Maryland, which held the WKDL call sign from 1993 to 2000
- WRCW, a radio station (1250 AM) licensed to Warrenton, Virginia, United States, which held the call sign WKDL from 2007 to 2014
