= Kevin Kiley (sportscaster) =

American football player and announcer (born 1954)

- Born: Kevin Robert Kiley; December 17, 1954 (age 71); Washington D.C., U.S.
- Education: University of Wyoming
- Occupations: Sports anchor Sports journalist Radio host Sideline reporter
- Known for: Kiley & Booms (Fox Sports Radio, WKRK-FM); Sunday Night Football (NFL on Westwood One)
- Spouse: Lauren Kiley
- Children: Alex Riley; Kristopher Kiley

Kevin Robert Kiley Sr. is an American sportscaster and talk show host.

Kiley has worked on radio and television, including talk shows on Fox Sports Radio, WQAM in Miami, and WTEM in Washington. Kiley also spent over a decade at Turner Sports (TBS/TNT), covering everything from the NFL to the Goodwill Games, and worked for several years as a sideline reporter for Westwood One NFL coverage. In the late 1980s, Kiley was at ESPN, calling College Football games alongside Jim Kelly.

== Career ==
Kiley was part of Washington, D.C., sports radio outlet WTEM's initial lineup in 1992, being paired with Rich "The Coach" Gilgallon on the afternoon drive Kiley and the Coach, which was canceled the following January due to low ratings. He returned to WTEM in late 1996, hosting their midday slot solo (a hiatus period for The Tony Kornheiser Show) and was eventually paired with the Chuck Booms on WTEM's afternoon show. Kiley & Booms would be canceled by WTEM in late 1998, but the two were reunited in September 2000 as the nascent Fox Sports Radio's first afternoon drive show.

In 2007, he moved to Los Angeles after residing many years in the Washington, D.C. area. Kiley is the former co-host of The Michael Irvin Show on KESN 103.3 ESPN in Dallas/Fort Worth. The show was canceled February 5, 2010, with Kiley and Irvin later hosting a similar midday radio show on WQAM in Miami, a position he relinquished to reunite with Chuck Booms in 2011, co-hosting the morning show Kiley & Booms on Cleveland's "Sports Radio 92.3 The Fan" WKRK-FM. After Booms was fired in 2015, Ken Carman replaced him and the show was renamed Kiley & Carman.

Kiley resigned from WKRK in February 2016. On February 12, Kiley was not on the air after appearing the night before on a local TV sports show in Cleveland, during which he announced his departure from the radio station. He claimed he was being censored by station management, but indicated that it was not the reason he was leaving. He said that he had actually submitted his resignation the previous November and it was supposed to take effect at the end of February. Kiley sparked controversy in January 2016 when he called the hiring of Kathryn Smith as a coach by the Buffalo Bills "absurd", and said women should not be allowed to be NFL officials or vote for the Pro Football Hall of Fame.

Kiley has also been an anchor/reporter for ABC affiliate WJLA-TV in Washington, D.C., as well as Raycom Sports and Jefferson-Pilot.

== Personal life and family ==
Kiley played football for the University of Wyoming and the Chicago Fire of the World Football League, and was cut by the New York Jets in 1974 during training camp.

Kiley's son Kevin Jr. was a professional wrestler for WWE, who performed under the ring name Alex Riley.
