= WRCW =

Radio station in Warrenton, Virginia

Former simulcast of WWRC, Bethesda, Maryland
- Warrenton, Virginia; United States
- Broadcast area: Warrenton, Virginia; Fauquier County, Virginia
- Frequency: 1250 kHz
- Branding: 570 The Answer

Programming
- Language: English
- Format: Conservative talk
- Affiliations: Compass Media Networks; Premiere Networks; Salem Radio Network; Townhall

Ownership
- Owner: Salem Media Group; (Salem Communications Holding Corporation)
- Sister stations: WAVA; WAVA-FM; WWRC

History
- First air date: November 21, 1957
- Last air date: April 2025
- Former call signs: WEER (1957–1982); WPRZ (1982–2007); WKDL (2007–2014)
- Call sign meaning: "WRC Warrenton"

Technical information
- Licensing authority: FCC
- Facility ID: 53368
- Class: D
- Power: 3,000 watts (day); 125 watts (night)
- Transmitter coordinates: 38°43′52.4″N 77°46′41″W

Links
- Public license information: Public file; LMS
- Webcast: Listen live
- Website: am570theanswer.com

WRCW (1250 AM) was a conservative talk formatted broadcast radio station licensed to Warrenton, Virginia, serving Warrenton and Fauquier County, Virginia. The station power was 3,000 watts daytime, and 125 watts at night. WRCW was owned and operated by Salem Media Group.

The station went on the air in 1957 as WEER, becoming WPRZ in 1982, WKDL in 2007, and WRCW in 2014. At the time of its closure in 2025, WRCW was a full-time relay of sister station WWRC in Bethesda, Maryland.

== History ==
=== WEER ===
WRCW's original call letters were WEER. In September 1957 the O.K. Broadcasting Company was issued a construction permit for a 500 watt, daytime-only station on 1250 AM in Warrenton, Virginia. WEER received its first license on January 18, 1958.

=== WPRZ ===
On January 26, 1982, the station's call letters were changed to WPRZ, for "Praise Radio", as the station adopted a Christian radio format. On September 30, 2007, WPRZ signed off after being sold to Metro Radio, Inc. on August 15, 2007, for $1.1 million. The Christian format was continued online-only for a time and now resides at WPRZ-FM 88.1.

=== WKDL ===
On October 12, 2007, the call letters became WKDL, and the station adopted a Spanish language talk format. The WKDL call letters had been used in the mid-1990s at 1050 AM in Silver Spring, Maryland, which at the time was co-owned with WKDV (1460 AM) in Manassas, Virginia, with both stations affiliates of the children-oriented Radio AAHS network.

On May 21, 2008, the station switched to a classic country format. In mid-November, the country format was abruptly dropped for brokered programming.

From January 31, 2011, until February 2012, WKDL simulcast the talk format of WTNT (730 AM) in Alexandria, Virginia on a full-time basis. Its programming lineup consisted mostly of Talk Radio Network offerings, particularly America's Morning News, The Laura Ingraham Show, America's Radio News Network, The Jerry Doyle Show, The Savage Nation, The Rusty Humphries Show and The Phil Hendrie Show.

WKDL was sold to Salem Communications in February 2012 for $10,000. This purchase was mainly so Salem could make engineering changes that would allow it to double the daytime power of WWRC (1260 AM) to 10,000 watts. To make way for the improved WWRC signal, WKDL's daytime power was reduced from 5,000 watts to 3,000 watts, and a strong directional antenna was designed to send most of the station's signal southwestward, away from Washington D.C.

=== WRCW ===
On July 23, 2014, the station changed its call sign to WRCW. The station served as a southwestern relay of the conservative talk programming on WWRC. WRCW continued simulcasting WWRC when it moved to 570 AM in November 2017, ahead of Salem's sale of the 1260 AM facility (now WQOF).

The Federal Communications Commission cancelled WRCW's license on April 17, 2025.
