= Red Zebra Broadcasting =

American media corporation and radio station operator

- Company type: Private company
- Industry: Entertainment, advertising
- Founded: 2006
- Headquarters: Rockville, Maryland
- Key people: Rick Carmean, CEO, until close of business 12/15/15
- Products: radio

Red Zebra Broadcasting was a sports marketing company headquartered in Rockville, Maryland. The company owned and operated four radio stations in the greater Washington, D.C. radio market, one in Hampton Roads, VA, and two stations in Richmond, Virginia.

Red Zebra announced the sale of its remaining station, WTEM, in May, 2018. The official transfer took place in August 2018, at which point Red Zebra was officially disbanded.

Red Zebra’s flagship stations were WTEM ("ESPN 980") and WSPZ ("Sports Talk 570") in Washington. WTEM focused on local sports talk, while WSPZ In Richmond, Virginia ESPN affiliate WXGI, 950AM “The Game” was branded as an ESPN Radio outlet providing daily sports programming.

The company began in 2006, when it bought WBZS-FM (92.7 FM, Prince Frederick, Maryland), along with sister stations WBPS-FM (94.3 FM, Warrenton, Virginia) and WKDL (730 AM, Alexandria, Virginia) and changed the call letters to WWXT, WWXX, and WXTR. The new trimulcast was branded as "Triple X ESPN Radio," and cleared most of ESPN Radio's weekday programming, as well as a local show hosted by former Redskin John Riggins.

Triple X was initially intended as a competitor to Washington's established sports talk station, WTEM. However, in 2008, Red Zebra bought WTEM, and eventually sold off the Triple X network.

The centerpiece of Red Zebra's programming consisted of content focused on the Washington Redskins football franchise, including play-by-play game coverage as well as regular daily conversational pieces.

In addition to the Redskins, both stations provided a wide array of ongoing daily sports talk venues covering Washington’s prime sports teams, including the Nationals, Capitals and Wizards, as well as all other major sporting events.

The company also provided play-by-play coverage for the Maryland Terrapins Football and Basketball programs, and Virginia Cavaliers football and basketball.

The company hosted a group of on-air talent including several former Washington Redskins players and several award-winning sports writers, columnists and radio sportscasters. As of March, 2017 the lineup included Chris Cooley, Brian Mitchell, Doc Walker, Bram Weinstein and Steve Czaban.
