= Liz Clarke =

American sportswriter

Liz Clarke is an American journalist who had been a sportswriter for The Washington Post since 2001 and until 2023. She has covered the sport of NASCAR for The Charlotte Observer, Dallas Morning News, USA Today and The Washington Post. She covered the Georgetown Hoyas men's college basketball team for the Washington Post.

== Career ==
A graduate of New York City's Barnard College in 1983, Clarke lives in Washington, D.C. She had been a sportswriter for The Washington Post since 2001 and until 2023. Clarke spent four seasons as a Washington Redskins beat writer for The Post, and has written extensively about the Olympics, tennis and college sports. Clarke also was a weekly "side-chick" on The Tony Kornheiser Show, and served as Mr. Tony's motorsports translator. She was an occasional panelist on Comcast SportsNet's Washington Post Live, an interactive sports roundtable covering the stories, trends and topics in the news and on the minds of sports fans throughout the Mid-Atlantic area.

Over the course of her career, she has twice been awarded as NASCAR's top print journalist with the Russ Catlin Award for Excellence in Motorsports Journalism (1996 and 2003). Her first book, One Helluva Ride: How NASCAR Swept the Nation, was released on February 12, 2008. In the book, Clarke brings people closer to the sport and business of NASCAR. Clarke chronicled NASCAR's transition from regional obsession to national phenomenon; while also profiling the sport's dynasties, the Allisons, Pettys and Earnhardts.
