= Bruce Murray (sportscaster) =

Bruce Murray is an American sports radio personality and the host of a daily radio show on SiriusXM's NFL Radio. Murray is the host of the "SiriusXM Blitz", heard Monday through Friday from 12PM - 3PM eastern time. He has been with SiriusXM and its predecessor, Sirius Satellite Radio, since 2006, when he began as co-host of The Mike and Murray Show and later became the lead in to Christopher "Mad Dog" Russo on "Mad Dog Radio"."

== Background ==
Born in 1963, Murray is a 1981 graduate of Hewlett High School and in 2004, he was inducted into the Hewlett High School Hall of Fame He attended Tulane University, where he "was the voice of the Green Wave's basketball, baseball and football teams from 1983–1985."

Bruce has three sons, Jack, Max, and Lucas with his wife Hilary.

Murray began his career as a producer and weekend sports anchor at the nation's first all sports radio station, WFAN. He moved on to become a line producer at the now defunct Mizlou Sports News Network." He's also worked at ESPN Radio and at Washington, D.C.'s sports radio station WTEM where he hosted the Washington Bullets pre-game, post-game and Coaches show.

Murray joined Sporting News Radio in the 1990s. From 2002 to 2005, Murray hosted Sporting News Radio's morning show Murray in the Morning, a hot talk-oriented morning zoo that departed heavily from the network's usual sports talk format. He also co-hosted The Troy Aikman Show, The Bill Parcells Show and Around the NFL.

In 2009, Murray was one of the original on-air personalities when SiriusXM's Mad Dog Radio channel was launched. On March 8, 2012, he joined with best-selling author and columnist John Feinstein for the sports talk show, Beyond the Brink before the departure of Feinstein to CBS. In March 2013, Murray announced his departure from Mad Dog Radio, and moved over to the NFL Channel on SiriusXM, co-hosting The SiriusXM Blitz with former quarterback Rich Gannon. In addition to Rich Gannon, Murray's co-hosts have included, Alex Smith, Kirk Morrison, Todd Haley, Charles Davis, Mark Dominik, Phil Savage and Max Starks.
