= Ken Beatrice =

American radio personality (1943-2015)

Kenneth Edward Beatrice (July 28, 1943 – December 6, 2015) was an American radio personality. He was the host of a Washington, D.C.-area radio call-in sports show for many years, first on WMAL between 1973 and 1995 and later on WTEM from 1995 to 2000.

== Early life ==
Kenneth Edward Beatrice was born on July 28, 1943. His family was Italian-American. He graduated from Boston College in 1965. During the 1970s, Beatrice worked for the Massachusetts Registry of Motor Vehicles. He also studied football scouting reports in his spare time.

== Broadcasting career ==
=== WBZ ===
After occasionally appearing on WBZ radio sports shows as a guest, Beatrice joined the station in 1975 as the weekend host of Calling All Sports. He replaced Guy Mainella as weekday host in 1976, but was moved back to weekends after five weeks and succeeded by Bob Lobel.

=== WMAL ===
In 1977, Beatrice joined WMAL as host of Sports Call, the station's nightly sports show, and the Washington Redskins pregame show. He became one of the city's most prominent and highest-rated radio hosts. On February 20, 1981, Beatrice admitted to The Washington Star that he had made "exaggerations" about his accomplishments on the air. He confessed that he did not play football at Boston College, that his doctorate degree was from a diploma mill in Ohio, and that his scouting system only involved people who scouted as a hobby. His admission came as The Washington Post was about to publish a story by Tony Kornheiser written after several weeks of intense questioning in which Beatrice admitted that he had no role in the Boston Patriots drafting Fran Tarkenton. He took a leave of absence after the story broke, but returned after five weeks. On August 16, 1991, Beatrice suffered a heart attack, which required him to undergo triple bypass surgery and miss many weeks of work.

By 1995, Beatrice's ratings had decreased to 5,000 listeners per fifteen minutes (down from 20,000 in 1990). On October 4, 1995, it was announced that WMAL was dropping Beatrice's show. The station's decision resulted in 200 phone calls and about 40 letters from supporters. His final program aired on October 6 and featured calls from Washington Redskins head coach Norv Turner, Redskins general manager Charley Casserly, and Washington Bullets head coach Jim Lynam.

=== WTEM ===
On October 16, 1995, Beatrice signed a contract to host a sports program on a radio network owned by Sam Huff. The program originated from Middleburg, Virginia, but was syndicated nationally, including on WTEM in Washington, D.C. On April 20, 2000, Beatrice retired from radio.

=== Style ===
Beatrice was known for his high-pitched voice, pronounced Boston accent, encyclopedic knowledge of sports (especially NFL draft prospects), opinionated nature, respectful treatment of kids who called into his show, and his long running promos for Arby's. Some believe he had a tendency to talk over guests and callers, go off on tangents, and lecture guests. His catchphrase was "You're next!" and he would invite callers who were on hold when the show ended to stay on the line and he would answer their questions off the air.

== Post-retirement ==
After his retirement, Beatrice settled in Haymarket, Virginia. He was a lector at St. John the Evangelist Church in Warrenton, Virginia, where he also trained other lectors. He died on December 6, 2015, from complications of pneumonia at the age of 72.
