= WTEM =

Sports radio station in Washington, D.C.

- Washington, D.C.; United States
- Broadcast area: Washington–Baltimore metropolitan area
- Frequency: 980 kHz
- Branding: The Team 980

Programming
- Language: English
- Format: Sports radio
- Affiliations: BetMGM Network; Fox Sports Radio; Maryland Terrapins; Washington Wizards; Westwood One; WJFK-FM

Ownership
- Owner: Audacy, Inc.; (Audacy License, LLC)
- Sister stations: WDCH-FM; WIAD; WJFK; WJFK-FM; WLZL; WPGC-FM

History
- First air date: August 1, 1923
- Former call signs: WRC (1923–1984); WWRC (1984–1998)
- Former frequencies: 640 kHz (1923–1928); 950 kHz (1928–1941)
- Call sign meaning: "Team"

Technical information
- Licensing authority: FCC
- Facility ID: 25105
- Class: B
- Power: 50,000 watts day; 5,000 watts night
- Transmitter coordinates: 38°57′43.4″N 76°58′22.9″W
- Repeater: 106.7 WJFK-FM HD2 (Manassas)

Links
- Public license information: Public file; LMS
- Webcast: Listen live (via Audacy); Listen live (via iHeartRadio)
- Website: www.audacy.com/theteam980

WTEM (980 kHz) is a commercial AM radio station licensed to serve Washington, D.C. Owned by Audacy, Inc., the station services the Washington–Baltimore metropolitan area with a sports radio format. WTEM is the co-flagship station of the Maryland Terrapins (shared with Audacy-owned WJZ-FM in Baltimore), and is the Washington affiliate of Fox Sports Radio.

== History ==
=== WRC era ===
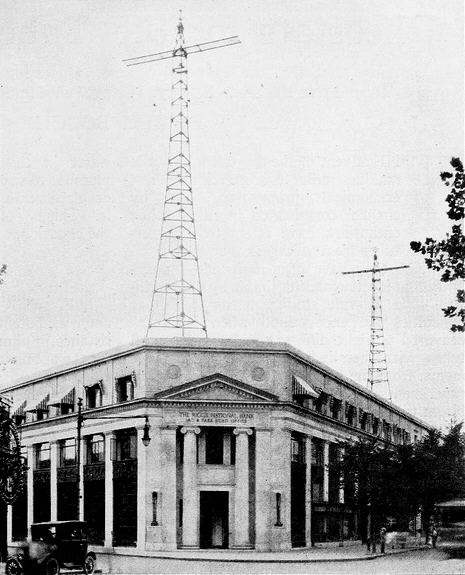
WRC radio towers atop the Riggs Bank building (1923)

The station was originally licensed in April 1923 as WRC—the call sign having represented the original owner's name, the Radio Corporation of America (RCA). The station's original frequency was 469 meters (equal to 640 kHz). It was shared time with another Washington station, WCAP. The time-sharing arrangement between the two stations continued until 1926, when RCA purchased WCAP's share.

WRC was a charter network affiliate of the National Broadcasting Company (NBC) when it launched in November 1926. NBC split its programming into two networks two months later and WRC was assigned to the Red Network. NBC's other radio chain, the Blue Network, had no affiliate in the national capital until RCA entered into a lease agreement with WMAL in 1933. WRC and WMAL would become de facto sister stations during the lease term, which ran for eight years. WRC moved its frequency to 950 AM in 1928, and then shifted to 980 AM in 1941 as a result of the North American Regional Broadcasting Agreement (NARBA).

RCA/NBC later launched WNBW television (channel 4, now WRC-TV) and WRC-FM (93.9 MHz, now WKYS), with both stations signing on in 1947. For its first couple of decades, WRC-FM mostly simulcast WRC. One popular WRC show featured Willard Scott and Ed Walker as the Joy Boys from 1955 to 1972. WRC also carried the Monitor radio program on weekends. From 1972 to 1975, WRC broadcast a contemporary hit radio format and was known as the Great 98. A popular DJ on WRC was Doug Tracht, known as the "Greaseman," who would later host mornings for many years on WWDC-FM and in radio syndication.

=== News and talk ===
WRC switched to an all-news radio format, using the "NBC News and Information Service" (NIS) from 1975 to 1977. After the NIS network was discontinued, the station aired its own all-news format, competing with established all-news station WTOP. It switched to a news/talk format in 1979. The talk programming included the first pairing of political writers Pat Buchanan and Tom Braden, who became the original hosts of CNN's Crossfire, as well as satirist Mort Sahl, psychologist Karen Shanor and former Philadelphia talk-show host Jerry Williams. Jack Doniger hosted an evening sports-talk show.

The AM's former Top 40 format was moved to WRC-FM and later evolved into a disco music format in the late 1970s as WKYS "Kiss FM". When the disco format cooled, WKYS evolved to an urban contemporary format.

NBC sold WRC to Greater Media in 1984 as it began its exit from radio ownership. Federal Communications Commission rules at the time did not allow two separately-owned stations to share a call sign. Since NBC retained WRC-TV and the right to the call sign, the AM station became WWRC. The station remained the Washington affiliate of the NBC Radio Network well into the late 1980s. With the sale, the station changed to a full-service middle of the road format, of popular music, talk and information, on September 1, 1984. During the early 1990s, WWRC was the home to popular shows hosted by Joe Madison, Mark Davis and Joel A. Spivak. It was also one of the brief homes for the last radio show to be hosted by Morton Downey, Jr. (the other being WRC's former sister station WTAM in Cleveland). By the mid-1990s, WWRC was a full-time talk station.

Two weeks prior to swapping call signs and formats, in February 1998, WWRC dropped its talk radio format for a financial news and talk format, one that would last over to a second dial position move to 1260 kHz.

=== SportsTalk Radio 570 - The Team ===
Before moving to 980 kHz, WTEM was known as Sports Radio 570 - The Team and on the frequency of 570 kHz. It previously had been used by classical music station WGMS. WTEM made its debut at 3:30 p.m. on May 24, 1992, right after the Indianapolis 500. At the beginning, WTEM emulated the program lineup and even imported the jingles from New York City's WFAN, the first all-sports radio station in the United States.

At the beginning, Paul Harris hosted the morning show between 6 a.m. and 10 a.m. The Washington Post columnist Tony Kornheiser took over in late mornings, and CBS Sports announcer/WUSA sportcaster James Brown hosted early afternoons. Kevin Kiley and Rich "The Coach" Gilgallon hosted Kiley and the Coach during afternoon drive time, which emulated WFAN's highly successful Mike and the Mad Dog radio program. Jean Fugett and Ira Mellman anchored the night-time hours. WTEM also acquired the radio rights to broadcast Washington Redskins football between 1992 and 1994.

However, the ratings of WTEM struggled in the beginning. Harris was quickly replaced by Bruce Murray and Bob Berger in late 1992. WTEM introduced the syndicated Imus in the Morning on July 19, 1993, to replace Murray and Berger in the 6–10 a.m. morning slot. For cost-cutting reasons, WTEM canceled Kiley and the Coach, and shows hosted by Phil Wood (8 p.m. to midnight) and Rob Weingarten (midnight to 6 a.m.) at the end of 1994. After Kiley and the Coach was canceled, WTEM tried several afternoon-drive shows before it settled on Kornheiser live between 10 a.m. and 1 p.m. and then replayed between 4 p.m. and 7 p.m. to boost the afternoon drive-time ratings until the show moved to ESPN Radio in January 1998. After his contract was not renewed by WMAL, Ken Beatrice and his show, Sports Call, moved to WTEM in late 1995.

When The Tony Kornheiser Show launched in 1992, because Tony needed to focus on writing his "Style" column in The Washington Post weekly, he usually did not host the show on Thursdays. Usually Andy Pollin, the sports director at WTEM, would guest-host Tony's show on Thursdays. Between November 1995 and December 1996, Warner Wolf was the guest host of The Tony Kornheiser Show on Thursdays until he moved to New York as a sports anchor on WCBS-TV. Tony started to host on Thursdays when he was on ESPN Radio.

When The Tony Kornheiser Show was on hiatus between November 14, 1997, and January 5, 1998, WTEM filled the 10 a.m.-1 p.m. slot with Kevin Kiley and the 4–7 p.m. slot with comedian Chuck Booms and Scott Linn. Booms joined WTEM as part of a stunt revolving the Comedy Central show Comics on Delivery, where viewers were asked write in and enlist the aid of comedians to help them get through experiences from daily life. Because of on-air wildness and inexperience, Booms was later paired with the experienced Kiley.

When The Tony Kornheiser Show on ESPN Radio debuted on January 5, 1998, the show aired between 1–4 p.m. WTEM filled the 10 a.m.–1 p.m. time slot with Rick "Doc" Walker and Al Koken hosting The Doc and Al Show and the 4–7 p.m. time slot with Kiley and Booms.

=== SportsTalk 980 ===
On March 9, 1998, WTEM and WWRC swapped dial positions, with WTEM moving to the stronger 980 frequency. After the move, WTEM was branded as SportsTalk 980. The lineups on March 9, 1998, are Imus in the Morning (6–10 a.m.), The Doc and Al Show (10 a.m.–1 p.m.), The Tony Kornheiser Show on ESPN Radio (1–4 p.m.), Kevin Kiley and Chuck Booms (4–7 p.m.) and Ken Beatrice's Sports Call (7–10 p.m.).

Because of poor ratings, Kiley and Booms were canceled on November 13, 1998, which happened to be Friday. WTEM moved the highly rated The Tony Kornheiser Show to the 4–7 p.m. slot as a tape delay show to replace Kiley and Booms. Kornheiser did not like the idea because he would lose the callers from the WTEM broadcasting area. WTEM moved The Doc and Al Show into the 1–4 p.m. slot and created a new show hosted by Rich Cook and Kris O'Donnell in the 10 a.m.–1 p.m. slot.

When John Thompson resigned as the head coach of the men's basketball team at Georgetown University, WTEM moved The Doc and Al Show into the 10 a.m.–12 p.m. slot and invited Thompson to host a one-hour show within The Doc and Al Show (10:30–11:30 a.m.) called Timeout with Thompson starting March 3, 1999, before the 1999 NCAA Tournament began. At the same time, WTEM introduced The Jim Rome Show, assigned it into the 12–3 p.m. slot. Between The Jim Rome Show and The Tony Kornheiser Show, there was a one-hour program called The Playground hosted by WTEM news anchors.

After the 1999 NCAA Tournament, because of the positive reviews, Thompson was named the host of The John Thompson Show airing 10 a.m.–12 p.m. with Walker and Koken as co-hosts, replacing The Doc and Al Show.

On September 13, 1999, ESPN Radio moved The Tony Kornheiser Show to his favorite 10 a.m.–1 p.m. slot to make room for The Dan Patrick Show. WTEM accommodated the move by moving The John Thompson Show to 3–5 p.m., reducing The Jim Rome Show to two hours and creating a new program called The Sports Reporters hosted by Andy Pollin between 5–7 p.m.

After the new lineup was announced, Jim Rome voiced his displeasure on the air, attacked Kornheiser and demanded WTEM to get his third hour back. In The Sports Reporters, Steve Czaban began as a news anchor. Later on, Czaban became the co-host with Andy Pollin.

On April 20, 2000, veteran sports talk personality Ken Beatrice retired. His show, Sports Call, was replaced by Steve Czaban in the 7 p.m.–10 p.m. slot.

On April 9, 2001, WTEM became a secondary Fox Sports Radio affiliate, picking up ESPN's Mike and Mike in the Morning (6–9 a.m.) and Fox's The Tony Bruno Extravaganza (9–10 a.m.). Both shows replaced Imus in the Morning, which moved to WTNT to boost the station's ratings. Czaban's evening program would also be picked up nationwide by Fox Sports Radio later that year; the show would be moved by the network to morning drive in January 2005, with WTEM followed suit later that year.

On May 23, 2002, WTEM celebrated its tenth anniversary as a sports talk station with a special Sports Reporters show starting at 5 p.m.

From December 2003 until January 2005, WWRC (1260 AM) carried a complementary sports/talk format as "SportsTalk 1260". WWRC carried the majority of Fox Sports Radio's lineup, simulcast WTEM's afternoon programming, and picked up Jim Rome in its entirety, enabling WTEM to become an exclusive ESPN Radio outlet (save for Czaban's syndicated program).

In December 2005, the station's studios were moved from Bethesda, Maryland, to 1801 Rockville Pike, Rockville, Maryland, to consolidate Clear Channel's Washington operation.

Because of Tony Kornheiser's preparation for ESPN's Monday Night Football, The Tony Kornheiser Show on WTEM ended on April 28, 2006, and Kornheiser eventually left for WTWP. Starting on May 1, 2006, The Sports Reporters with Andy Pollin and Steve Czaban filled in the 9 a.m.–12 p.m. slot, a new show hosted by Brian Mitchell and Bram Weinstein aired between 12 p.m. and 3 p.m., and The John Thompson Show was extended through 7 p.m.

In early June 2006, The Brian Mitchell Show changed again. Bram Weinstein left WTEM and was replaced by Kevin Sheehan.

Starting February 12, 2007, The Brian Mitchell Show moved to the 10 a.m.–1 p.m. slot, The John Thompson Show moved to the 1 p.m.–4 p.m. slot and The Sports Reporters with Andy Pollin and Steve Czaban filled in the 4 p.m.–7 p.m. slot.

On April 30, 2007, Doc Walker went solo and hosted The Doc Walker Show from 9 a.m. to 11 a.m. WTTG's Dave Feldman and Comcast SportsNet's Carol Maloney hosted a new show called Feldman and Maloney between 11 a.m. and 1 p.m. Brian Mitchell moved to The John Thompson Show as co-host. Regarding going solo, Walker said, "Management came to me and I thought that it was time to do my own show. If you are lucky enough to get a chance to do your own show you would be foolish not to take it. I will miss Al and Coach, but it was a perfect time for me to go out on my own".

On May 26, 2007, Phil Wood returned to WTEM, and hosted a weekly baseball show from 10 a.m. to noon on Saturdays. Then, on October 22, 2007, The Dan Patrick Show, syndicated by the Content Factory, was back on WTEM in the 11 a.m.–1 p.m. slot as a tape delay show, replacing Feldman and Maloney. Both hosts were dropped following the merger of WTEM with Triple X ESPN Radio.

=== Triple X ESPN Radio ===
In 2006, WBZS-FM 92.7 in Prince Frederick, Maryland, along with sister stations WBPS-FM 94.3 in Warrenton, Virginia, and WKDL (730 AM) in Alexandria, Virginia, were sold to Red Zebra Broadcasting—a company controlled by Washington Redskins owner Daniel Snyder. On July 17, 2006, the two FM stations' Spanish oldies format ended to make way for ESPN Radio. The three stations became known as WWXT, WWXX, and WXTR, and the stations were collectively promoted as Triple X ESPN Radio. The new trimulcast cleared most of ESPN Radio's weekday programming, as well as a local show hosted by former Redskin John Riggins.

Red Zebra Broadcasting then purchased WTEM, WTNT (570 AM), and WWRC (1260 AM) from Clear Channel in a deal announced in 2008. WTEM became the new flagship of the Triple X ESPN Radio network, while WXTR became the Washington outlet for ESPN Deportes Radio. The deal also marked the return of Redskins football to WTEM for the first time since 1994, while it was on 570 AM.

=== ESPN 980 ===
When WTEM merged with Triple X ESPN Radio, the last hour of The Herd with Colin Cowherd was eliminated, as well as the entire network show hosted by Mike Tirico and Scott Van Pelt (the latter of whom graduated from the University of Maryland, College Park in the local area). WXTR temporarily remained in the simulcast until assuming a separate format as the Washington, DC affiliate of ESPN Deportes Radio on September 1, 2008. WXTR also served as the Spanish-language home of Washington Redskins games in 2008 and 2009.

Due to the new contract with ESPN Radio that guaranteed a full clearance for Mike and Mike in the Morning, Steve Czaban's morning show on Fox Sports Radio was dropped. That show, however, continued to be produced from WTEM's studios until Fox Sports Radio canceled the program in December 2009.

On September 8, 2009, The Tony Kornheiser Show returned to WTEM in the 10 a.m.–noon slot, dropping Cowherd's show entirely.

Red Zebra flipped WTNT (570 AM) from its conservative talk format to sports/talk to "SportsTalk 570" on September 20, 2010, running the ESPN Radio network feed all day as a complement to WTEM. The station changed call signs to WSPZ on October 18, 2010, after Red Zebra sold WXTR to Metro Radio. WSPZ was the primary Washington-area affiliate of the Virginia Cavaliers radio network and acted as a backup station in the case of any play-by-play scheduling conflicts with WTEM.

Red Zebra sold off all of its radio properties in 2017–18. WWXT went to Urban One on April 20; it became WDCJ, a simulcast of WMMJ. WWXX was sold to Educational Media Foundation and runs the K-Love contemporary Christian music network as WLZV. WSPZ was also sold to Salem Media Group, and now airs a conservative talk radio as WWRC. Rights to University of Virginia sports remained with the new WWRC.

On January 31, 2018, WTEM rebranded as The Team 980.

=== Sale to Urban One, then Entercom ===
On May 21, 2018, Urban One announced its purchase of WTEM for $4.2 million, pending regulatory approval. As part of the sale, Urban One agreed to a rights deal with the Redskins to maintain the station's relationship with the team. Urban One told The Washington Post that it would keep sports programming on WTEM. The purchase was consummated on August 9, 2018.

On June 13, 2019, Cumulus Media announced that ESPN Radio would move to WMAL on July 1, 2019, as that station changed to full-time sports programming. Concurrently, WMAL announced it would carry Washington Redskins broadcasts, though WTEM remained the team's flagship station. Following the loss of ESPN Radio, WTEM rejoined Fox Sports Radio, airing its evening, overnight, and weekend lineups, while still featuring local hosts during the day on weekdays.

In September 2019, WTEM added a 250 watt FM translator, W240DJ, broadcasting from Silver Spring, Maryland, at 95.9 MHz.

On November 5, 2020, Urban One announced that it would swap WTEM and three other stations in Philadelphia and St. Louis to Entercom, in exchange for Entercom's stations in Charlotte, North Carolina. Entercom took over the stations under a local marketing agreement on November 23. FM translator W240DJ was not included in the sale and remained with Urban One. The swap was consummated on April 20, 2021.

On March 24, 2021, WTEM lost its longtime status as the Washington home of the Baltimore Orioles to WSBN. On September 14, WTEM became the flagship station for the Washington Wizards.

On October 13, 2025, it was announced that sister station WJFK-FM would once again be the flagship station for the Washington Wizards, with any games overlaping with the Capitals airing on WTEM and WDCH-FM. In addition, it was announced the station would be among those airing TV audio of Washington Mystics games along with WJFK-FM, WDCH and WJFK (AM).

== Past local hosts and news reporters ==
- Rich Ackerman (currently at WFAN and Sirius Satellite Radio)
- Ken Beatrice (deceased)
- Jack Harris (WRC morning disc jockey, now at 970 WFLA)
- Bob Berger (currently at Sporting News Radio)
- John Bisney (WRC)
- Jim Bohannon (WRC - later at Westwood One - died November 12, 2022)
- Camille Bohannan (WRC - currently at AP Radio)
- Chuck Booms
- Tom Braden (WRC - deceased)
- James Brown (currently at CBS Sports)
- Rudy Brewington (WRC)
- Pat Buchanan (WRC - currently at MSNBC)
- Paul Butler (currently at WBOC-TV Salisbury, MD)
- Jerry Coleman (currently at WQLL in Baltimore)
- Rich Cook
- Steve Czaban
- Richard Day (currently at WTOP-FM)
- Don Doke (WRC News)
- Jack Donniger (WRC Sports)
- Dave Feldman
- Earl Forcey (currently at Westwood One)
- Jean Fugett
- Al Galdi
- Rich Gilgallon (currently at KKGX)
- Wendell Goler (WRC - deceased)
- Tina Gulland (WRC federal beat)
- Paul Harris (currently at KMOX)
- John Irving (WRC)
- Scott Jackson (currently at WCMC-FM in Raleigh)
- Kevin Kiley (currently at Westwood One and KSPN in Los Angeles)
- Al Koken
- Tony Kornheiser (Show is now heard on podcast)
- Marge Kumaki (WRC)
- Mitch Levy (currently at KJR (AM) in Seattle)
- Scott Linn
- Mac McGarry (WRC booth announcer extraordinaire - deceased)
- Carol Maloney
- Ira Mellman
- Dan Miller (currently at WJBK-TV in Detroit)
- Brian Mitchell
- Bruce Murray (currently at Sirius Satellite Radio
- Paul Nanos (currently at FOX Sports Radio 1410 in Hartford, CT)
- Kris O'Donnell (currently at WDTN in Dayton, Ohio)
- Donna Penyak (WRC)
- Tony Roberts (WRC Sports)
- Mort Sahl (WRC)
- Willard Scott (WRC "The Joy Boys", top 40 jock in the mid 1970s - died in 2021)
- Kevin Sheehan
- Doug Tracht (aka "The Greaseman") (WRC)
- John Thompson (Deceased)
- Ed Walker (WRC "The Joy Boys" - deceased)
- Rick "Doc" Walker
- Pam Ward (currently at ESPN)
- Mark Weber (later at WTOP, currently Brand Manager at McFarlane Toys)
- Bram Weinstein (Now play-by-play voice of the Washington Commanders)
- Rob Weingarten (currently at KFNS (AM) in St. Louis)
- Warner Wolf (formerly at WABC in New York City)
- Phil Wood (WRC Sports and WTEM - currently at MASN)

Preceded by WGMS	AM 570 kHz in Washington, D.C. May 24, 1992-March 8, 1998	Succeeded by WWRC
Preceded by WWRC	AM 980 kHz in Washington, D.C. March 9, 1998–Present	Succeeded by Incumbent
