= Andy Pollin =

American radio and TV personality (born 1958)

Andrew Pollin (born August 3, 1958) is an American radio and TV personality. He currently co-hosts, with Rob Long, about half of the episodes of The Mid-Atlantic Sports Report on MASN. He helped launch Washington, D.C. sports talk station WTEM in 1992 and held the title of Sports Director until January 2017. He joined WJFK 106.7 The Fan in February 2017 and now hosts The Andy Pollin show with Thom Lovero For 13 years, Pollin co-hosted The Sports Reporters with Steve Czaban, until his departure in July 2013. The last "Sports Reporters" aired July 31, 2013. He acted as sidekick on The Tony Kornheiser Show between 1992 and 2006. He also co-hosted GameDay with Mel Kiper Jr. on ESPN Radio between 1998 and 2004.

== Biography ==
Pollin grew up in Chevy Chase, Maryland and graduated from Bethesda-Chevy Chase High School in 1976. After enrolling in American University he became involved in that school's radio station and left to start his radio career in Beaumont, Texas. He later graduated from Trinity University in San Antonio.

Pollin served as reporter for sports talk radio pioneer WFAN in New York City from its inception in 1987 until leaving for WTEM. Prior to that he reported for the UPI Radio Network in Washington, D.C. (1983–1987), and WFAA-AM in Dallas (1981–1983).

Pollin is the co-author of The Great Book of Washington, D.C. Sports Lists with Leonard Shapiro.

When Pollin was with The Tony Kornheiser Show on ESPN Radio, he was nicknamed "Andy Polley." A listener angered by Pollin's comments about baseball player Rafael Palmeiro had called the show and mispronounced Pollin's name, screaming, "Andy Polley, you are an idiot!" Show producer Denis Horgan Jr. recorded the "Andy Polley" soundbite and the staff often aired it when Pollin spoke.

The nickname stuck, and the gag was later extended into a now-defunct website, [www.andypolley.com], which featured photos and comments about Pollin often related to current Kornheiser radio shows. Polley evolved into a full character, who drives a beat-up old Honda, with orange juice on the leather seats.

Andy Polley's rules:

- AP Rule # 1: All computers are different.
- AP Rule # 2: Big screens skew the TV ratings. Big screens = lower rating with more people watching one TV
- AP Rule # 3: Leather seats in your car are a waste of $$.
- AP Rule # 4: $200 a year for his clothing allowance.

Although no longer hosting a program of his own, he is working for ESPN 980 (formerly WTEM) as a summer fill in for Kornheiser.

Pollin was moved to WTEM's sister station, WSPZ 570AM, and is doing a solo show from 6 a.m. to 9 a.m. on weekdays.

On January 20, 2017, Pollin left WTEM when his contract expired. Pollin wrote an article in The Washington Post to reflect his 25-year sports radio career on the Washington D.C. airwaves.

Pollin now hosts a show with Thom Lovero on 106.7 The Fan DC on Saturdays and Sundays.

In July 2019, Pollin left 106.7 The Fan to be ESPN 630's morning update anchor during the station's broadcasts of ESPN's “Golic & Wingo Show” weekdays from 6 a.m. to 10 a.m. while also providing features for the station.
