= WPRZ-FM =

Radio station in Brandy Station, Virginia

- Brandy Station, Virginia; United States
- Broadcast area: Culpeper, Virginia
- Frequency: 88.1 MHz

Programming
- Format: Religious

Ownership
- Owner: Praise Communications, Inc.

History
- First air date: May 28, 2010
- Former call signs: WKYF (2010)
- Call sign meaning: "Praise"

Technical information
- Licensing authority: FCC
- Facility ID: 121978
- Class: B1
- ERP: 10,000 watts
- HAAT: 137 meters (449 ft)
- Transmitter coordinates: 38°30′42″N 78°3′21″W

Links
- Public license information: Public file; LMS
- Webcast: Listen live
- Website: www.wprz.org

WPRZ-FM (88.1 FM) is a religious non-commercial educational radio station licensed to serve the community of Brandy Station, Virginia, United States. The station covers the greater Culpeper, Virginia, area. WPRZ-FM is owned and operated by Praise Communications, Inc.

== History ==
After applying in October 2007 and overcoming an engineering objection by the American Family Association in July 2008, Praise Communications was granted the original construction permit for this station on December 16, 2009. This construction permit is scheduled to expire on December 16, 2012.

=== Callsign ===
The original WPRZ broadcast on 1250 AM from 1982 through October 2007. When that station was sold, new ownership Metro Radio dropped the callsign on October 4, 2007, releasing it for public use. Less than two weeks later, Educational Media Foundation claimed WPRZ-FM for its K-Love station in Newton Grove, North Carolina, moving it later in 2008 to another K-Love station in Fredonia, Kentucky. Praise Communications' construction permit was first granted the callsign WKYF (apparently connoting Fredonia, Kentucky) on January 21, 2010; it swapped with EMF's station and became WPRZ-FM on March 1, 2010.

== Broadcasting ==
As of February 15, 2010, Praise Communications was "ready to order the antenna, the transmitter, and the building to house the transmitter which will be located at the tower site". While construction and resting were underway, the station broadcast online only, via their website, from studios in Warrenton, Virginia. The station began regular broadcast operations on May 28, 2010.
