= Steve Czaban =

American sports radio personality

- Born: June 1, 1968 (age 58); McLean, Virginia, United States
- Education: University of California, Santa Barbara (B.S. 1990)
- Spouse: Deana Czaban
- Children: 2
- Presenting career
- Show: The Steve Czaban Show
- Station: 97.3 The Game
- Network: iHeartMedia
- Time slot: Weekdays, 6-9 AM (Central)
- Style: Sports radio
- Country: United States
- Website: czabe.com

Steve Czaban (pronounced ZAY-ben; born June 1, 1968) is an American sports radio personality. Czaban formerly hosted The Steve Czaban Show on 97.3 The Game. He also formerly hosted The Steve Czaban Show on Yahoo! Sports Radio and formerly hosted a daily sports segment for Bob & Brian. He was previously featured on Fox Sports Radio.

== Early life and education ==
Czaban has joked that he grew up "...on the mean streets of McLean, Virginia." His father was a computer-systems analyst for the United States Department of Agriculture and his mother taught elementary school. He attended Cooper Middle School and Langley High School before enrolling at the University of California, Santa Barbara. He graduated in 1990 with a B.S. in Communications and Political Science.

== Career ==
=== Early ===
Upon graduating, Czaban served as the radio announcer for the UC Santa Barbara Gauchos' basketball and football teams in addition to hosting a local sports show on KTMS-AM 1260 in Santa Barbara, California until 1994.

Czaban moved back to his hometown and was hired by Andy Pollin at WTEM to do updates as a part-timer for Team Tickers during Summer 1994.

=== Chicago and Charlotte ===
In late 1994, Czaban moved to Chicago to host the morning show on the One-On-One Sports radio network. While in Chicago he met Bob Madden and Brian Nelson, the hosts of Bob & Brian, and added The Sports Report with Steve Czaban segment to their show under the title of "Original Sports Donkey". He hosted until his departure in 2018.

In 1998, Czaban was hired by WFNZ based in Charlotte, North Carolina, as their afternoon sports show host, but exited in June 1999.

=== Return to WTEM ===
==== The Sports Reporters ====
After six months at ESPN Radio, Czaban rejoined Pollin in 2000 for The Sports Reporters, which aired on Washington, D.C.–based WTEM. In an incident that Yahoo Sports labeled as an example of "bigotry and ignorance", the duo raised controversy in December 2012 when commenting on then 50-year-old transgender Mission College basketball player Gabrielle Ludwig. During the segment Czaban refereed to Ludwig as "it" and said, "Don't go playing sports saying 'But I've got the rights of everyone else.' Yeah, you've got the rights to live as a human being, you know, with other people respecting you and everything else, but athletics is different." Following outcry from various LGBTQ advocacy groups, Czaban issued a ten-second apology, which OutSports.com called one of "least sincere non-apologies in history." The comments resulted in suspensions for both hosts.

==== The Drive ====
After a 13-year run, in July 2013 ESPN 980 announced that Pollin would be replaced as Czaban's co-host by former Washington Redskins tight end Chris Cooley. With the departure of Pollin, The Sports Reporters was discontinued while the new show, The Drive with Cooley and Czabe, debuted on August 1, 2013, and included Al Galdi. He signed a three-year extension to continue hosting the show on January 6, 2014.

=== Fox Sports Radio ===
While hosting The Sports Reporters, Czaban joined Fox Sports Radio in 2002 and hosted GameTime with Steve Czaban. In January 2005, he was moved to The First Team on Fox as part of their morning lineup, later renamed the Steve Czaban Show until its cancellation in December 2009.

=== Sporting News Radio, Yahoo! Sports Radio ===
It was announced in August 2010 that Czaban would return to Sporting News Radio (formerly One-On-One Sports). He was joined by his long-time sidekicks, including co-host Scott Linn, producer Steve Solomon and anchor Al Galdi and later, Tim Murray.

=== SB Nation ===
After Yahoo Sports Radio was re-branded into SB Nation in August 2016, The Steve Czaban Show continued its morning time slot until September 19, 2016, when listeners were informed via his website that his contract was not renewed; the show was taken off the air. In late October 2018, he abruptly quit the Bob and Brian in the Morning show on 102.9 The Hog in Milwaukee. In the Washington DC market, he was on the air during the afternoon drive (4:00 to 7:00 p.m.) until his contract with Team 980 ended on December 31, 2020.

=== Boo Ben Konop Day ===
Czaban has celebrated "Boo Ben Konop Day" on the day after the MLB All-Star game given that there's nothing else to talk about on that day in regards to sports. This is about Konop being booed by a heckler when he announced his Mayoral campaign. The clip became popular and was later mentioned and parodied in the show South Park where Cartman heckled Wendy.

== Personal life ==
Czaban is married to Deana Czaban and resides on 10 acres in Round Hill, Loudoun County, Virginia. The couple has two daughters.
