= Bram Weinstein =

American sportscaster (born c. 1973)

- Born: 1972 or 1973 (age 52–53); Silver Spring, Maryland, U.S.
- Education: American University
- Occupation: Sportscaster
- Employers: Washington Commanders; Washington Spirit
- Children: 2

Bram N. Weinstein is an American sportscaster who is the play by play broadcaster for the Washington Commanders and Washington Spirit. He previously worked at ESPN from 2008 to 2015, most notably as a host for SportsCenter.

== Career ==
Weinstein was born c. 1973 in Silver Spring, Maryland, later attending Springbrook High School. Prior to working for ESPN, Weinstein was a sports radio personality in Washington, D.C., working as the lead beat reporter for the Washington Redskins on Triple X ESPN Radio. He was the sideline reporter during radio game broadcasts, co-hosted Redskins Lunch and Redskins Radio and hosted The Bram Weinstein Show. Weinstein previously worked for CNN's Washington Bureau, KHAS-TV in Hastings, Nebraska and WTEM in Washington, D.C. He joined the National Football League (NFL)'s Washington Commanders as their play by play radio broadcaster in August 2020 and the National Women's Soccer League (NWSL)'s Washington Spirit in May 2024.

== Personal life ==
Weinstein was raised Jewish. He is married with two children. He graduated from Springbrook High School in Silver Spring, Maryland. He continued his education at American University in Washington, D.C., where he was a member of the Sigma Alpha Mu fraternity and graduated with a bachelor's degree in broadcast journalism in 1995.
