= WWRC =

Radio station in Bethesda, Maryland

- Bethesda, Maryland; United States
- Broadcast area: Washington Metropolitan Area
- Frequency: 570 kHz
- Branding: 570 The Answer

Programming
- Language: English
- Format: Conservative talk radio
- Affiliations: Compass Media Networks; Premiere Networks; Salem Radio Network; Townhall

Ownership
- Owner: Salem Media Group; (Salem Communications Holding Corporation)
- Sister stations: WAVA; WAVA-FM

History
- First air date: January 2, 1946
- Former call signs: WQHQ (1946); WQQW (1946–1951); WGMS (1951–1992); WTEM (1992–1998); WWRC (1998–2001); WTNT (2001–2010); WSPZ (2010–2017)
- Call sign meaning: loosely taken from the former WRC (980 AM), now WTEM

Technical information
- Licensing authority: FCC
- Facility ID: 11846
- Class: B
- Power: 5,000 watts (day); 1,000 watts (night)
- Transmitter coordinates: 39°8′3.4″N 77°18′12.9″W

Links
- Public license information: Public file; LMS
- Webcast: Listen live
- Website: am570theanswer.com

WWRC (570 AM) – branded AM 570 The Answer – is a commercial conservative talk radio station licensed to serve Bethesda, Maryland. Owned by the Salem Media Group, the station services the Washington metro area and is the market affiliate for the Salem Radio Network and The Sean Hannity Show. The WWRC studios are located in Arlington, while the station transmitter resides in nearby Germantown. In addition to a standard analog transmission, WWRC is available online.

Despite the similar looking call sign, WWRC is a name-only descendant of the former WRC (980 AM)—now WTEM—and is not related to the current WRC-TV.

== History ==
=== Early years ===
On January 2, 1947, the station first signed on as WQQW. It was powered at 1,000 watts and was owned by WQQW, Incorporated. Only two years later, an FM station also signed on, simulcasting the AM station's programming, which was mostly classical music. In 1951, the call letters of both stations were changed to WGMS – Washington's Good Music Station.

In January 1958, RKO Teleradio Pictures purchased WGMS and WGMS-FM. RKO, which had been one of the Big Five Studios of the Hollywood studio system, had been branching out into the broadcasting industry, also buying WOR in New York City and KHJ in Los Angeles. KHJ, WOR's FM station and several other RKO stations around the country had switched to a Top 40 radio format, which proved quite successful.

To encourage unique programming on the FM band, in 1967 the FCC prohibited AM-FM pairs in large markets (population over 100,000) from simulcasting each other for more than 12 hours per day. WGMS and several other classical stations, including WQXR New York and KFAC Los Angeles, obtained exemptions from the rule in 1972. Not only could these stations not afford to produce an additional 12 hours of programming daily, but their music needed to stay on AM as their older audiences often did not have FM radios in their cars. WGMS in particular found itself under threat of an immediate format change if it did not receive the waiver.

A proposal in the 1970s to convert WGMS to a Top 40 sound upset many of its influential listeners, some of them in the Senate and House of Representatives.

By the 1990s, even though ratings were still good, the classical audience was aging, and there were reports that WGMS's owners were again considering switching to a more youthful format. WGMS was sold to Washington, D.C. venture capitalists Steven and Mitchell Rales.

=== Sports and conservative talk ===
On May 24, 1992, at 3:30 p.m., the station switched to all sports, with the call letters changing to WTEM, signifying the word "team". Chancellor Broadcasting purchased the station in August 1996. Chancellor Broadcasting purchased Capstar Broadcasting in 1999, resulting in a combined entity known as AMFM Inc. In 2000, AMFM Inc. merged with Clear Channel Communications, today known as iHeartMedia.

On March 9, 1998, Chancellor swapped two of its Washington-area AM stations. WTEM moved to 980 kHz, while WWRC moved from 980. On April 9, 2001, WGAY (1260 AM) changed calls to WWRC, assuming the business talk format, while WWRC changed their calls to WTNT—standing for the explosive "TNT"—and with the slogan "Dynamite Talk" (which was dropped in 2005). The station aired a variety of conservative talk programs, including local hosts Michael Graham and Paul Berry, and syndicated shows hosted by G. Gordon Liddy, Bill Bennett, Monica Crowley, Mike Gallagher, Mancow, Glenn Beck, along with Don Imus, Jim Bohannon and Coast to Coast AM.

Washington Redskins owner Daniel Snyder's Red Zebra Broadcasting purchased WTNT, WTEM, and WWRC from Clear Channel in June 2008. Snyder pledged no format changes in the short term to either WTEM or WWRC, which by this time ran conservative and progressive talk formats respectively.

On September 15, 2008, the conservative-leaning WTNT was branded as "McCain 570" while progressive talk WWRC was likewise dubbed "Obama 1260". The temporary branding lasted throughout the 2008 presidential election. On November 10, 2008, WTNT was renamed "Freedom 570", and eventually retook the "570 WTNT" brand early in 2010. Meanwhile, WWRC was sold to Salem Communications to become an outlet for the Salem Radio Network's conservative talk radio format.

=== Return to sports ===
On September 20, 2010, WTNT returned to an all-sports format, and was rebranded as "SportsTalk 570", a partial throwback to WTEM's former "SportsTalk 980" nickname and logo. On October 18, the station changed its call sign to WSPZ, signifying "Sports". Red Zebra sold off the 730 kHz facility to Metro Radio, which picked up WTNT's call letters and previous conservative talk format.

As "SportsTalk 570", WSPZ was the flagship station for SB Nation Radio's morning show hosted by WTEM afternoon personality Steve Czaban, and airing ESPN Radio programming the rest of the day. It ran as an all-network complement to the all-local WTEM. WSPZ was also the Washington-area affiliate for University of Virginia football and basketball. Some Baltimore Orioles games which WTEM was unable to air were carried by WSPZ.

=== Salem Media ownership ===
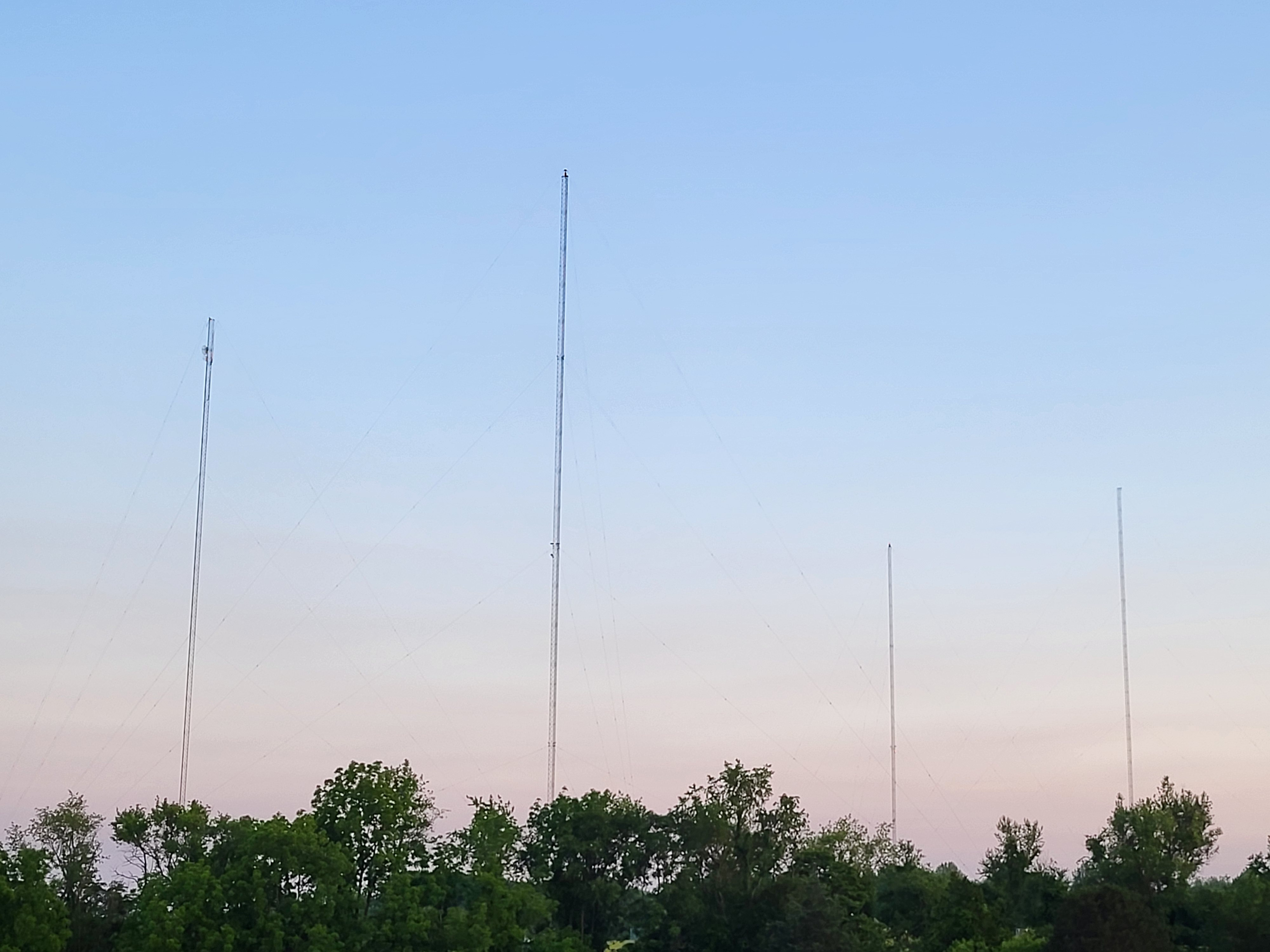
WWRC's broadcasting tower in unincorporated Montgomery County, Maryland, June 2025.

Red Zebra Broadcasting began selling off its radio properties in 2017. Salem Media Group bought WSPZ, along with the land underneath its transmitter, on May 19, 2017. Salem's AM 570, LLC took control of the station on September 16, 2017, with a simulcast of WWRC's conservative talk programming. After engineering work at the transmitter was completed, WWRC's intellectual unit—the talk format, "Answer" branding, and callsign—moved to 570 AM on November 20. After a brief move to WTEM, University of Virginia broadcasts returned to WWRC under Salem's ownership due to WTEM's commitments to University of Maryland sports.

Dating back to its time on 1260 AM, WWRC's programming was repeated on WRCW, 1250 AM in Warrenton, Virginia; the simulcast ended when Salem closed WRCW in April 2025.

== Programming ==
The Salem Radio Network provides most of the station's weekday programming, with shows hosted by Hugh Hewitt (morning drive), Mike Gallagher (late mornings), Dennis Prager (middays), Jay Sekulow (evenings), Larry Elder (evenings), Eric Metaxas and Sebastian Gorka (late nights) and Dan Proft (overnights). Other national weekday programming includes The Sean Hannity Show in late afternoons (via Premiere Networks) and This Morning, America's First News with Gordon Deal in early mornings (via Compass Media Networks). Weekend programming also includes syndicated shows hosted by John Catsimatidis, Rudy Maxa and Frank Gaffney.
