= Willard Scott =

American weather presenter and television personality (1934–2021)

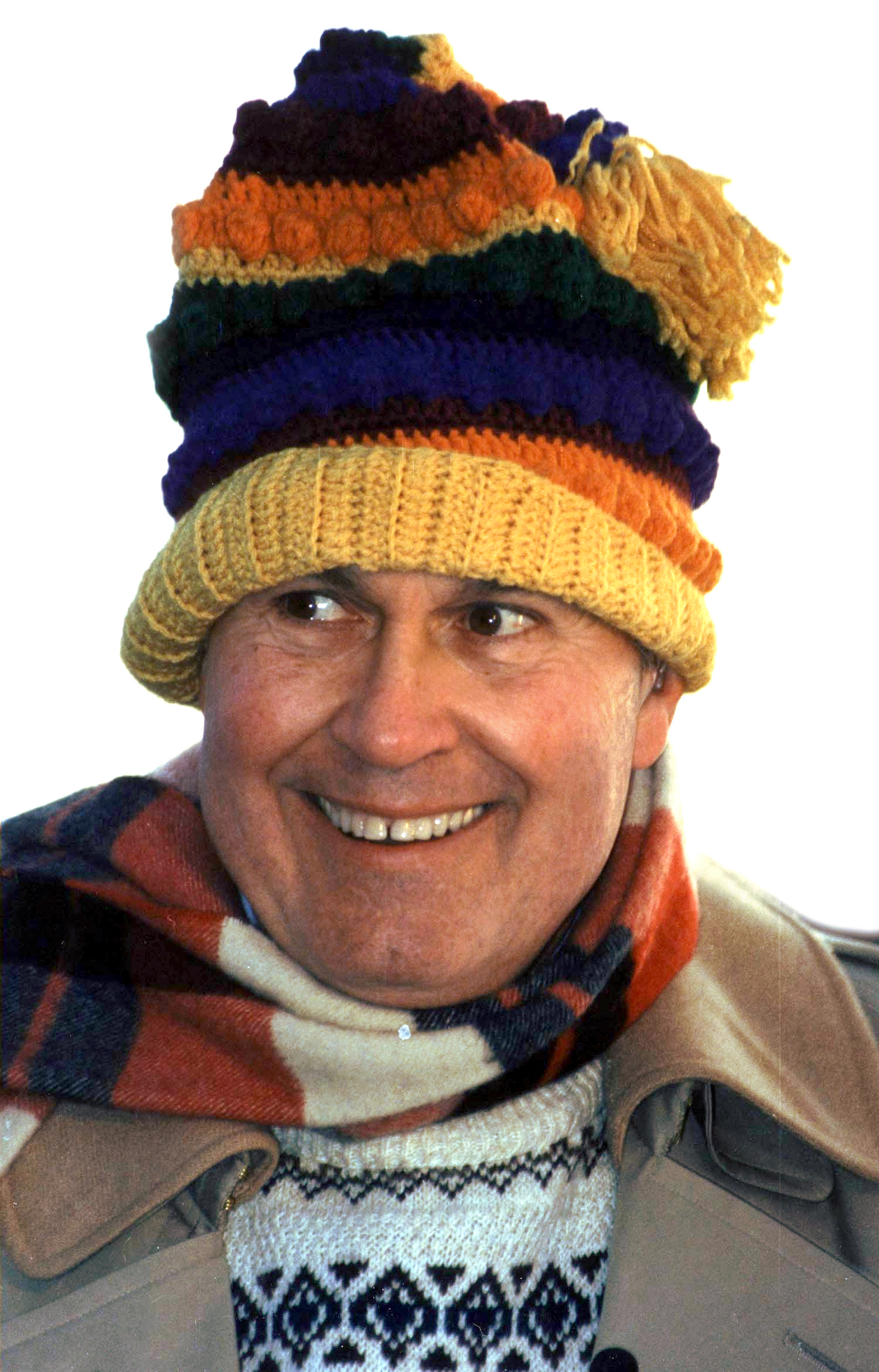
- Scott in 1995
- Born: Willard Herman Scott Jr. March 7, 1934; Alexandria, Virginia, U.S.
- Died: September 4, 2021 (aged 87); Delaplane, Virginia, U.S.
- Education: American University
- Occupations: Weather presenter; author; television personality; actor; clown; comedian; narrator; radio personality
- Years active: 1950–2015
- Notable work: Weather Reporter on Today; Creator and original portrayer of Ronald McDonald; Joy Boys Radio Program; Birthday greetings for centenarians; Narrator of NASA TV programs
- Spouses: Mary Dwyer Scott (m. 1959; died 2002) Paris Keena (m. 2014)
- Children: 2

Willard Herman Scott Jr. (March 7, 1934 – September 4, 2021) was an American weatherman, radio and television personality, actor, narrator, clown, comedian, and author, whose broadcast career spanned 68 years, 65 years with the NBC broadcast network. Scott was notable as a weather reporter on NBC's Today show where he also celebrated US centenarian birthdays and notable anniversaries. Scott was the creator and original performer of McDonald's mascot clown Ronald McDonald.

The 6'3", 290 lb. (191 cm, 130 kg) Scott was described by The New York Times as a "garrulous, gaptoothed, boutonnière-wearing, funny-hatted, sometimes toupee-clad, larger-than-life American Everyman". Scott parlayed his national exposure as weather presenter into a highly successful career as a pitchman who promoted an ever-widening range of products the fees for which outstripped his million-dollar annual salary at NBC (equivalent to $2.2 million in 2024). Scott said, "I run me like a conglomerate, because that's what I am. I always keep lots of balls in the air."

Scott credited his success to his efforts to make everyone, his audience, his clients feel loved. Scott said, "If you watch, you’ll see that I am trying to weave a web of love. I want to make the whole country feel as if we are one. I may be a cornball, but I am me — not a sophisticated, slick New York wazoo act." Early radio contemporary Johnny Holliday said of Scott, "Everybody he came in contact with just loved the guy. He just had that magic about him, that he made everybody feel special."

In Scott's autobiography The Joy of Living he summed his life, saying "If you were to look at my resume, you’d see that I’m ...bald, I’m overweight, I don’t make all the smooth moves and I dress like a slob. I take tremendous pride in the fact that I beat the system."

== Early life and education ==
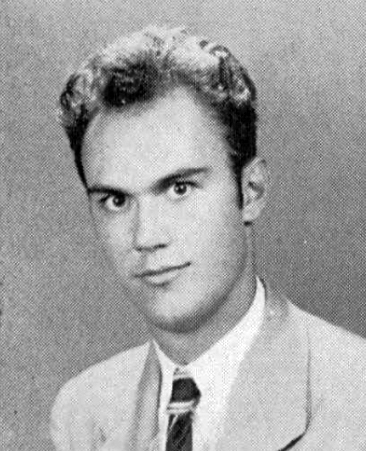
Photo of Willard Scott as a senior at George Washington High School, Alexandria, Virginia

Scott was born on March 7, 1934, in Alexandria, Virginia, the only child of parents Willard Herman (1905—1977) and Mattie Thelma (née Phillips) Scott (1905—1977). Scott was raised as and remained a fundamentalist Christian who considered becoming a minister before starting his broadcasting career.

=== Childhood interest in broadcasting ===
Scott showed an early interest in broadcasting. Recounting his first experience visiting a radio station, he said "One day when I was eight, Mom took me to the movies in DC. Afterward, she wanted to shop, so I wandered over to my favorite radio station, WTOP. I introduced myself to the receptionist and told her I was a fan. She took me to the control room and said, 'You can sit here if you stay very quiet. That man will be broadcasting live'. The man was Eric Sevareid, then a correspondent for CBS. He’d just gotten back from Burma, where he’d been lost in the jungle for months. I sat there enthralled as Sevareid recounted his ordeal".

At the age of nine, Scott organized a group of 15 boys into a radio club on his neighborhood block. Scott built his own radio station in his family home's basement and sold ads he aired during his low power broadcasts. The club netted about $25 a month (equivalent to $470 in 2025) in advertising revenue from neighborhood businesses. Scott said "...I set to work building a station in our basement. My parents bought me an oscillator, which enabled me to broadcast to 20 neighborhood homes within a 180-foot [50-meter] radius. My friends and I read the news, played tunes on a phonograph, and chattered away. A few months after we started, three men from the FCC showed up. They told us our signal was reaching National Airport — Pan Am’s radios were picking up kids talking and playing records. So ended my basement station".

Spending time at local Alexandria radio station WPIK-AM on Friday nights as a teenager, a local disk jockey allowed him to create a radio show called "Lady Make Believe". Scott also served as announcer for the show. Scott also held two part-time disk jockey jobs while in high school, "High School Hit Parade" on WOL 1450 AM and "Dancing Party" on WCFM 99.5 FM.

=== NBC radio announcer at 16 ===
Scott was 16 years old in 1950 when he worked as an NBC page at WRC (AM), NBC's owned-and-operated radio station in Washington, D.C., for $12 per week (equivalent to $160 in 2025). Scott explained how he started announcing at NBC – "I auditioned to be an announcer but was never hired. Then one of the announcers left for vacation and my boss said, 'What the hell, let Scott fill in — it’s only two weeks.' When he returned, I became a regular substitute".

=== High school and college ===
Scott attended Alexandria, Virginia's George Washington High School. While a freshman in 1947, Scott broadcast a high school news report on a local FM radio station every Saturday. Scott graduated high school in 1951. He was elected class president all four years of his attendance. Named "Our capable and popular class president", he was also voted "Most Likely to Succeed" by his classmates.

Scott attended American University, where he worked alongside fellow student Ed Walker at WAMU-AM, the university's radio station (1951—1953). Scott became a member of Alpha Sigma Phi fraternity while at American University and graduated in 1955 with a Bachelor of Arts degree in "philosophy and religion".

=== Military service ===
External audio
- "Willard Scott's Last Day Before Going In The Navy"

Scott enlisted in the U.S. Navy, serving from 1956 to 1958 as a seaman. Then 22 years old, Scott recorded his feelings on November 23, 1956, the day before he enlisted.

== Broadcast radio career ==
=== Joy Boys radio show ===
External videos
- The Joy Boys - Final Show, October 6, 1972

From 1955 to 1972, Scott teamed with Ed Walker as co-host of the nightly Joy Boys radio program on NBC-owned WRC radio (this was interrupted from 1956 to 1958 when Scott served on active duty in the U.S. Navy). Scott routinely sketched a list of characters and a few lead lines setting up a situation, which Walker would commit to memory or make notes on with his Braille typewriter (Walker was blind since birth).

The show opened with Scott and Walker singing their Joy Boys opening theme song set to the music of John N. Klohr's "The Billboard March". They recorded it in two versions, a duet between them, and Walker singing in four-part harmony with himself, for use as, respectively, the opening and closing themes for the show:

We are the Joy Boys of radio; We chase electrons to and fro-o-o. We are the Joy Boys of radio; We chase electrons to and fro.

In a 1999 Washington Post article recalling the Joy Boys at the height of their mid-1960s popularity, said the Joy Boys "dominated Washington, providing entertainment, companionship, and community to a city on the verge of powerful change". The Joy Boys broadcast on WRC until the station changed to a rock music format in October, 1972. The Joy Boys show moved to WWDC-AM for another two years. Scott wrote in his book The Joy of Living, their close professional and personal bond continued until Walker's death in October 2015. Scott said they were "closer than most brothers".

After the Joy Boys show ended, Scott thrived as a Washington D.C. area personality, doing product pitches and popping up at ribbon-cutting ceremonies.

=== WAVY AM 1350 disk jockey while in the Navy ===
In 1956 Scott lived near Norfolk, Virginia while serving in the U.S. Navy and moonlighted at WAVY AM radio as one of four staff disk jockeys who presented the "WAVY Nifty Fifty, Tidewater's Top Tune Tally.". He was promoted on local advertising for the Tidewater area radio station.

== Early broadcast television career ==
=== Children's programming ===
Scott felt his early work in children's programming was one reason for his success in engaging and entertaining television viewers. "I have always said that the best training to be a TV newsman or anybody on television is to do a children’s show because you are oblivious to the fact that there is a camera there. ...You are playing to the kids in the studio, and then you are playing directly to the kids at home. You look in the lens and you are never using a teleprompter ...and you get a tremendous, comfortable feeling in front of a camera doing a children’s show. There are no two ways about that: Doing a kid’s show is great training."

Scott's first children's television appearance was on WNBW TV's Barn Party in 1954. Scott said "My first chance to do kiddie shows professionally came before I was in the Navy, on a Saturday TV show called Barn Party. I was 'Farmer Willard' and I played opposite a very refined lady named Betsy Stelck, who had a fairyland aura about her..." The show was a hit. When children were asked to mail in requests for tickets to attend the weekly broadcast production, 6,223 requests were received. The studio only seated 50.

Scott later co-emceed with Mac McGarry on the 1955 afternoon variety program, Afternoon, broadcast on WRC-TV. The show featured live music, vocalists, fashion and food segments by Inga Rundvold and Jim Henson's puppet group Sam and Friends, an early incarnation of the Muppets. At the time, Henson was a college freshman. Scott remembered Henson's work as "... an innovative bunch of puppets created by a guy named Jim Henson. ... I worked with a bald-headed Muppet with a big nose, named Sam, sort of the way Fran Allison worked on Kukla, Fran and Ollie. Then there was the frog named Kermit. I used to do a commercial for a local peanut butter called Schindler's. He'd open his mouth, I'd give him a big spoonful, and he'd go 'ahh'".

Scott would later create and host the 1966 children’s series, Commander Retro. He later described his experience as, "The worst show I did in my life, in my opinion, was the best show I ever did in my life, we had more fun". Scott used Lester, his basset hound, as "Doctor Strangedog", a human German physicist and spy who had stowed away on the rocket ship. The spy had eaten too many hotdog sausages, exploded and turned into a talking dog. Scott played the commander of their traveling spaceship. The rocket ship set had control panels made of plastic mini-ice cube trays with blinking Christmas lights behind them. Scott said "This was a terrible show, a real turkey ...but it was more fun to do than any of them".

=== From Bozo the Clown to Ronald McDonald's creation ===
The television commercial debut of Willard Scott as Ronald McDonald (1963)

Scott later portrayed Bozo the Clown on WRC-TV's one-hour, weekday show Bozo's Circus. Scott said "WRC bought local rights to Bozo the Clown, and I was cast in the role. Bozo went to the White House and met JFK and Caroline. I played him from 1959 to 1962, doing a daily one-hour show". Washington, D.C., area McDonald's hired Scott – as Bozo – to attract customers. Whenever Scott as Bozo arrived at one of the then five D.C. area McDonald's, he caused traffic jams. Roads were shut down for two miles and extra police had to control thousands of kids as they arrived to see Bozo. WRC-TV canceled the show in 1962.

Washington, D.C., McDonald's stores had enjoyed incredible customer attendance when Scott appeared as Bozo the Clown. When WRC-TV cancelled the show, Scott could no longer appear as that character. The local McDonald's franchisees wanted another clown to drive sales and asked Scott to develop a new character. Scott said "At the time, Bozo was the hottest children's show on the air. You could probably have sent Pluto the Dog or Dumbo the Elephant over and it would have been equally as successful. But I was there, and I was Bozo... There was something about the combination of hamburgers and Bozo that was irresistible to kids... That's why when Bozo went off the air a few years later, the local McDonald's people asked me to come up with a new character to take Bozo's place. So, I sat down and created Ronald McDonald".

Scott's Ronald McDonald costume included a small paper cup over his nose, a large cardboard food tray worn as a hat and another smaller one worn at the beltline containing a complete McDonald's meal - a wrapped hamburger, a paper bag of fries and a drink - that “magically” replaced the hamburger every time one disappeared. Scott portrayed Ronald McDonald from 1963 through 1967, appearing in three television commercials and narrating a 45 rpm recording of "The Night Before Christmas" as part of a 1963 holiday promotion. The record has become a sought-after collectible.

McDonald's corporation purchased the Washington, D.C., franchise back from the area franchisees and became the owner of the Ronald McDonald intellectual property. Scott was told he would continue to portray the clown but just before he was to appear at the 1966 Macy's Thanksgiving Day Parade, Scott was replaced by a new clown actor, Coco, who had been a clown in the Ringling Brothers circus.

In his book Fast Food Nation, Eric Schlosser claims that McDonald's replaced Scott on account of his weight, supposedly concerned about McDonald's image. Scott denied the claims and cited other commitments he had at the time.

Scott continued to appear as Ronald McDonald in the Washington, D.C., broadcast market. In 1966, Scott served as master of ceremonies WRC-TV's new program, The Ronald Show. The show had a studio audience of 30 youngsters every Saturday who played games, performed dramatic skits and interacted with Scott as clown Ronald. Scott said the show was "One of those magnificent rare treasures ... featuring dramatizations and dance contests."

== Weather presenter career ==
Scott's weathercaster career started when he was chosen as a fill-in weatherman on WRC-TV in 1967. The incumbent had suddenly walked off the job. In 1970, Scott became WRC-TV's full-time weekday weatherman. In March 1980, the NBC network came calling, and Scott was named weatherman on TODAY, replacing Bob Ryan. Ryan then took Scott's old job, becoming the meteorologist at WRC-TV.

=== The Today Show ===
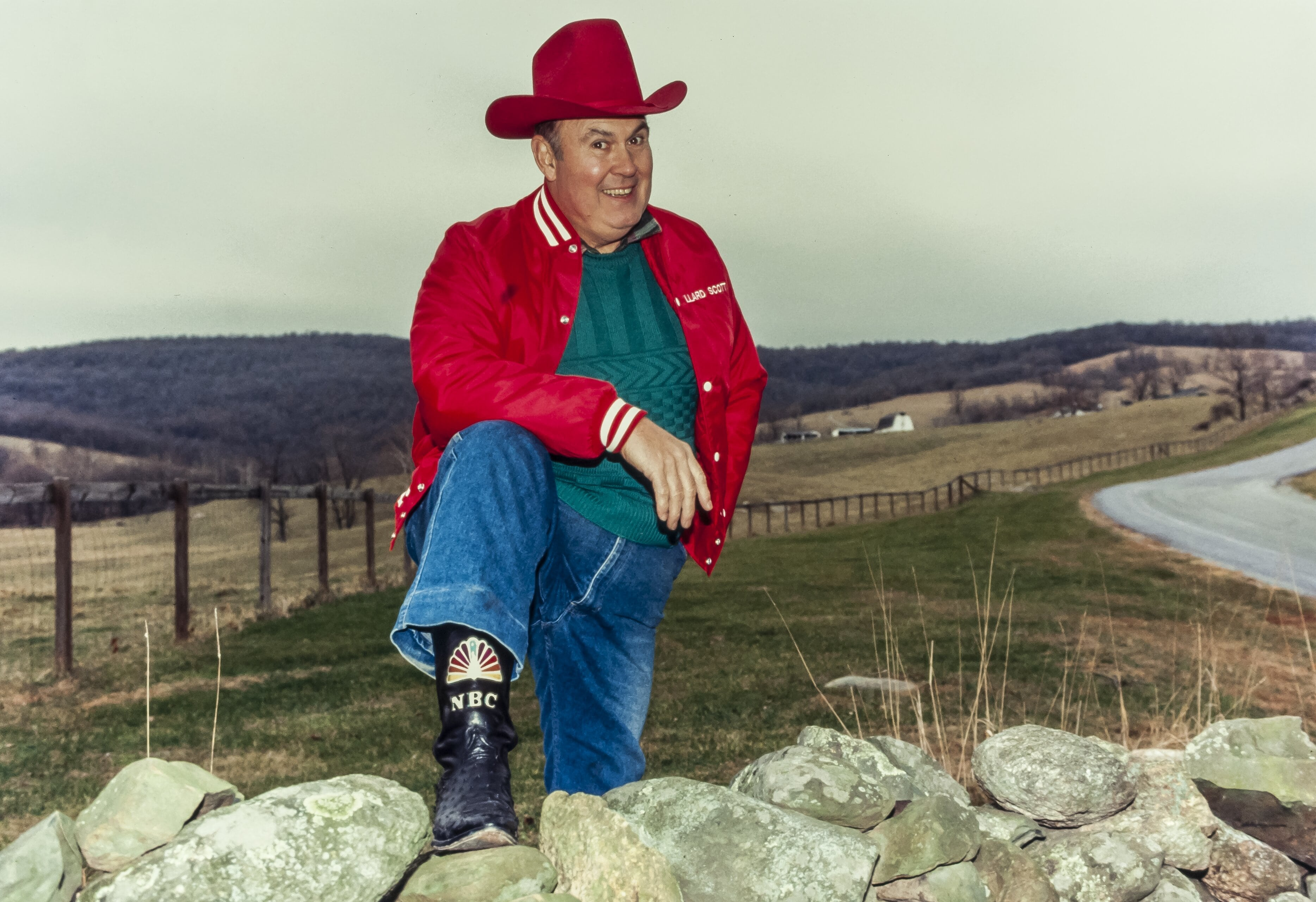
Scott near his home in The Plains, Virginia in 1989

Scott was tapped by NBC in 1980 to become its weatherman for The Today Show. At the time, the Today Show was in its first ratings battle with ABC's Good Morning America. Scott quickly established his ability to connect with his audience. Often appearing as different characters in his segments, he once delivered the weather as pop singer Boy George. His antics on Today helped move the show's ratings back to first place, where it remained for much of the decade.

During the 1980s, Scott routinely did weather reports on the road, interviewing locals at community festivals and landmarks. He also periodically performed on the program from Washington, D.C., which he still considered his home.

==== Appearance as Carmen Miranda ====
Scott said he used to dress up like Carmen Miranda as a kid to sell war bonds in World War II. He promised to don a Miranda outfit again if a viewer would donate $1,000 to the USO. The donation was made and Scott gave his August 22, 1983, weather forecast on the Today Show dressed in drag, wearing a bright red tropical dress, earrings and pearls, heels, and a showy, multi-colored headdress with feathers and fruit, reminiscent of the late Brazilian entertainer's outfits. Scott's weather forecast was accompanied by two flamenco musicians.

Discussing his Carmen Miranda appearance in 1987, Scott told the New York Times "People said I was a buffoon to do it. Well, all my life I've been a buffoon. That's my act." He explained his love for his audience, saying "I just love people. A lot of speakers on the talk circuit leave right afterward. I do a lot of schmoozing. I'm like a dog. You just open the door and I go, 'rrrr, rrrr,' and then I lick everybody's face."

==== Smucker's birthday segments ====
Scott started celebrating centenarians' happy birthdays on “Today” in 1983. "Saluting people on their 100th birthday started when I got a card that read, 'My uncle is turning 100. Could you mention him on TV?' I did it and about a week later got two cards, then four, then six." Eventually Smucker's sponsored the segment, showing each person’s photo and name on a Smucker's strawberry jelly jar label. When Scott died, Smucker’s posted a tribute to him, putting his face on the jelly jar label graphic.

==== Bryant Gumbel criticism and ratings repercussions ====
In 1989, The Today Show co-host Bryant Gumbel wrote an internal memo critical of the show's personalities, a memo that was later leaked to the media. In the memo, Gumbel said Scott "holds the show hostage to his assortment of whims, wishes, birthdays and bad taste ...this guy is killing us and no one's even trying to rein him in." This garnered enough of a backlash that the next time they appeared on camera together Scott kissed Gumbel on the cheek to show he'd forgiven him, and also later said he hoped the whole thing would go away.

After Gumbel's comments, ratings for the Today Show declined. According to NBC, the Q Score popularity tracking poll taken by Marketing Evaluations Inc. showed an increase in negative reaction to Gumbel and his earlier criticism of Scott in its annual May 1989 survey of the show. The then Today Show executive producer Tom Capra said "The publicity and the negative factors have hurt us". CBS network research also indicated continuing negative reaction to Gumbel's comments regarding Scott.

===== Today Show staff support =====
After Scott's Carmen Miranda appearance, former Today Show anchor Tom Brokaw said of Scott, "Willard was a born showman". Al Roker, the meteorologist who succeeded Scott on the Today Show said "No broadcaster was loved by so many and brought so many smiles".

== Later broadcast television career ==
=== Commercial pitchman ===
In 1992, Scott, who was the first incarnation of Ronald McDonald, recorded a commercial for McDonald's arch-rival Burger King. He also was the spokesman for the Days Inn hotel chain, appearing in their commercials from 1993 until 1997.

The companies Scott endorsed include: Howard Johnson Motor Lodges, True Value Hardware, Burger King, Lipton tea, Maxwell House coffee, the American Dairy Association, the Florida Citrus Commission, Diet Coke, USA Today and many others.

=== Willard Scott's Home and Garden Almanac ===
In 1995, Scott was the host of one of the first weekly series on the then new cable TV channel Home & Garden Television. The series ran two years.

=== Actor and Voice-over ===
Scott made occasional guest appearances as neighbor "Mr. Poole" on The Hogan Family, where his character was married to Mrs. Poole, played by Edie McClurg.

Scott worked as the narrator for NASA's weekly program called "The Space Story", with his contributions spanning from the Apollo Program to the Space Shuttle.

== Other TV work ==
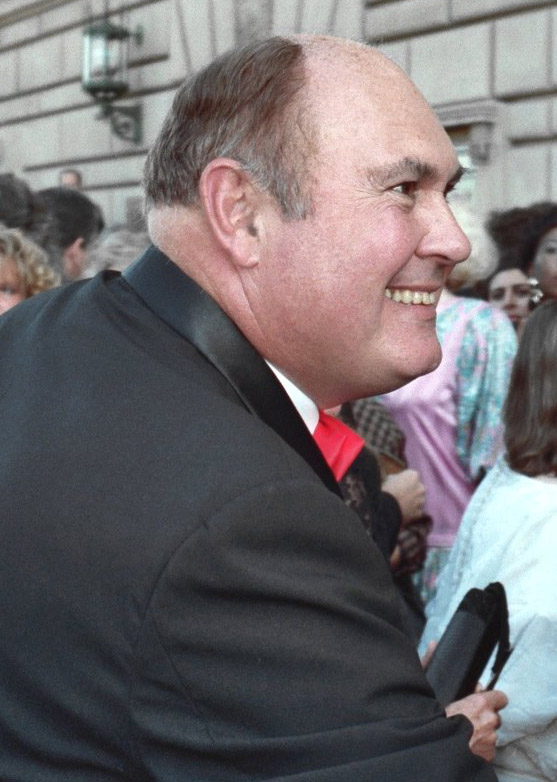
Scott at the 1990 Emmy Awards

=== Personal appearances / TV Commentator career ===
Scott was the host of WAVE TV's broadcast coverage of the Kentucky Derby Festival Pegasus Parade in Louisville, Kentucky, from 1982 through 2005. Scott also hosted the NBC telecast of the Macy's Thanksgiving Day Parade from 1987 to 1997. He was replaced by Matt Lauer in 1998.

For several years in the 1980s, Scott donned a Santa Claus costume for the broadcast of the National Tree-Lighting Ceremony in Washington, D.C.

In 1990 and 1992, Scott also hosted the Pillsbury Bake-Off on CBS (while under contract with CBS' rival NBC).

== Retirement ==
Scott went into semi-retirement in early 1996, succeeded by Al Roker who was a regular substitute for Scott on Today and was the weeknight weathercaster at WNBC in New York City. Scott had helped Roker earn the weather job at NBC's WKYC in Cleveland.

Scott continued to appear two days a week on the morning program to wish centenarians a happy birthday (a tradition that continues to the present day). He appeared from the studio lot of WBBH, the NBC affiliate in Fort Myers, Florida.

Scott also continued to substitute for Roker for over a decade afterward, an arrangement that mostly ended after NBC acquired The Weather Channel in 2008 and started using that channel's meteorologists as substitutes.

Scott announced his full retirement from television on December 11, 2015. On Scott's final day, Today held a tribute to Scott featuring taped highlights from his many years with the show. The plaza outside Rockefeller Center was renamed Willard Scott Way in his honor. Several former Today staff came to bid farewell to Scott including Tom Brokaw, Jane Pauley, Katie Couric, and Gene Shalit along with Barbara Bush. After Scott was feted on the "Today Show" with cupcakes and comments from co-anchors, he said "I'm fading off into the sunset" and started singing Dale Evans's song "Happy trails to you until we meet again. Happy trails to you. Keep smilin' on 'til then."

== Awards ==
Association	Award	Year
President Award	Private sector award for Public Service	1985
Virginian Association of Broadcasters	Distinguished Virginian	1990
Washingtonian magazine	Washingtonian of the Year	1979
National Society of Fund Raisers	Humanitarian in Residence	1985
National 4-H United States Department of Agriculture	National Partner in 4-H citations	1984
Johnson & Wales University	Honorary Doctorate	?

== Radio reissues and Santa Claus ==
In 2001, American University reissued some of the old Joy Boys radio broadcasts of the 1960s on CDs. He also played Santa Claus at various White House events.

== Writings ==
Scott published several fiction and non-fiction books:

External videos
- Booknotes interview with Scott on The Older the Fiddle, the Better the Tune, July 13, 2003, C-SPAN

- The Joy of Living
- Down Home Stories
- Willard Scott’s All-American Cookbook
- America Is My Neighborhood
- The Older the Fiddle, the Better the Tune
- If I Knew It Was Going to Be This Much Fun, I Would Have Become a Grandparent First

He also co-authored two books with Bill Crider:

- Murder Under Blue Skies
- Murder in the Mist

He preached a sermon at the 185th anniversary of his home church, First Baptist Church in Alexandria, Virginia, that was published in Best Sermons 2, edited by James W. Cox [Harper & Row, 1989].

== Personal life ==
Scott was married to Mary Dwyer Scott from 1959 until her death in 2002. The couple had two children, Mary and Sally. On April 1, 2014, at age 80, Scott married Paris Keena, whom he first met in 1977 while she was working at WRC-TV in Washington, D.C. They had been together as a couple since 2003. They lived on Sanibel Island, Florida.

=== Death ===
Scott died of natural causes on September 4, 2021, at the age of 87.

== Filmography ==
=== As himself ===
- Pillsbury Bake-Off (1990–1992) – Host
- Walt Disney World 4 July Spectacular (1988) – Himself
- The New Hollywood Squares (1987) – Himself
- Kentucky Derby Festival Pegasus Parade (1982-2005) - host
- Macy's Thanksgiving Day Parade (1987–1997) – Host
- The Bob Braun Show (1982) – Himself
- Today (1980–2015) – Himself

=== As actor ===
- Bozo the Clown(1959–1962)
- Ronald McDonald (1963–1965)
- The Hogan Family (1987–1989) – Peter Poole
- Undertale (2015) - Flowey (voice sampled from Ronald McDonald commercial)
