= Joy Boys =

Comedy Radio show

Ed Walker (l) and Willard Scott, The Joy Boys (1965)

The Joy Boys was a popular daily improvised comedy radio show in Washington, D.C., between 1955 and 1974 that launched the co-hosts Willard Scott and Ed Walker. The two did various skits and satirized prominent people of the day, such as Scott's character "Arthur Codfish" (mocking Arthur Godfrey). They both regularly parodied NBC-TV's Huntley-Brinkley Report with their own zany "Washer-Dryer Report". Walker told an interviewer years later that the duo imitated some 20 voices in all.

Scott and Walker teamed as co-hosts on AM station WRC, the NBC-owned-and-operated station in Washington, beginning July 11, 1955. Initially, the program was titled Two at One and aired at 1 p.m. The term Joy Boys originated when they adopted a brief song of that title, set to the "Billboard March" as their theme music:

We are the Joy Boys, of radio,
We chase electrons to and fro-o-o-o...

Later, the Joy Boys became a nightly feature at 7 p.m. on WRC. In a 1999 article recalling the Joy Boys at the height of their popularity in the mid-1960s, The Washington Post said they "dominated Washington, providing entertainment, companionship, and community to a city on the verge of powerful change". One of their many running gags was "As the Worm Turns", a spoof of the television soap opera, As the World Turns.

Walker, who was totally blind since birth, said that growing up "radio was my comic books, movies, everything". On the Joy Boys program, Scott would sketch a list of characters and a few lead lines setting up the situation that Walker would commit to memory or note on his braille typewriter. Scott and Walker formed a professional and personal bond which continued up to Walker's death. Scott said in his book, The Joy of Living, that they were "closer than most brothers".

The Joy Boys moved from WRC to another Washington radio station, WWDC (now WQOF), in October 1972, where it was heard until the show's final broadcast on October 26, 1974. The show was sold in syndication that year. Their parody of Masterpiece Theatre's Six Wives of Henry VIII, which they called Masterpuss Theater had a one-week airing on consecutive nights on KBYU-FM in Provo, Utah, in 1973.

American University has released some of the Joy Boys radio broadcasts of the 1960s on CDs. The Joy Boys' roast of WRC newsman Bryson Rash, when he became president of the National Press Club in Washington, D. C. in 1963, was released on a CD, Is Bryson Rash?.
