= The Tony Kornheiser Show =

Sports talk show podcast

- Genre: Sports Talk
- Running time: 60 to 70 minutes
- Country of origin: United States
- Home station: N/A
- Starring: Tony Kornheiser (Host, 1992 – present) Jeanne McManus (Co-host, 2007 – 2020); Chris Cillizza (Co-host, 2014 – 2020); David Aldridge (Co-host, 2007 – 2020); Gary Braun (Co-host, 2004-6, 2009 – 2020); Liz Clarke (Co-host, 2007 – 2020); Torie Clarke (Co-host, 2008 – 2020); Kevin Sheehan (News reporter, 2004-6 & 2009 – 2016)
- Produced by: Marc "Nigel" Sterne (2004 – present); Michael Kornheiser (executive producer, 2016 – present)
- Original release: May 25, 1992
- Website: www.tonykornheisershow.com
- Podcast: iTunes Podcast

The Tony Kornheiser Show is a sports podcast talk show out of Washington, D.C., hosted by Tony Kornheiser.

In 2012, Kornheiser was ranked No. 8 of the 100 most important sports talk radio hosts in America by Talkers Magazine. In 2016, he was ranked No. 1 in America's Top 20 Local Sports Midday Shows for 2015 by Barrett Sports Media.

== History ==
=== WTEM (1992–1997) ===
Because Kornheiser needed to focus on writing his Style column in the Washington Post weekly, he usually did not host the show on Thursdays, and would have Andy Pollin, the sports director at WTEM, guest host instead. Between November 1995 and December 1996, Warner Wolf was named the guest host of the Tony Kornheiser Show on Thursdays until he moved to New York City as a sports anchor on WCBS-TV.

=== ESPN Radio (1998–2004) ===
One feature of the show was Kornheiser's habit of interrupting Dan "The Duke" Davis's updates and make comments. Initially, Davis was not amused by Kornheiser's interruptions and took some time to adjust to them.

Tony's Mailbag concluded the show on ESPN Radio with Kornheiser reading emails from his listeners. The music that plays in the background during this segment is "Tea for Two Cha Cha" by Roy Battle (pronounced bah-tell by Kornheiser) and the Altones. The band is dubbed "[t]he official house band of the Tony Kornheiser Show".

In late 2001, Kornheiser decided to leave the microphones on when his show went to a commercial break, as a treat to his internet radio listeners. The result was the infamous yet wildly popular "Internet Show", where online listeners could hear what the people on the show really thought about sports, entertainment, and politics.

=== WTWP/WWWT and XM Sports Nation (2007 and 2008) ===
After completing the 2006 season on ESPN's Monday Night Football, Kornheiser considered offers from WTEM and WTWP to return to the Washington, D.C., area radio airwaves.

On January 23, 2007, Kornheiser decided to go to WTWP to host The Tony Kornheiser Show. Effective February 20, 2007, The Tony Kornheiser Show aired live on weekdays from 8:30 to 10:30 am, with a repeat that aired immediately afterward (on Fridays the last half-hour was preempted by The Politics Program).

The deciding factor for Kornheiser to join WTWP was his desire to work for a station affiliated with The Washington Post, where he had been since 1979.

For the new incarnation of the show, Kornheiser retained Marc "Nigel" Sterne as producer. Andy Pollin and Gary Braun remained at WTEM and Triple X ESPN Radio, respectively. The main cast of the show included:

- Brennan Haselton, the news reporter
- Joe Barber, the entertainment editor of WTOP
- David Aldridge of The Philadelphia Inquirer and TNT when Barber is away
- Jeanne McManus, former food editor of The Washington Post, a.k.a. "my dear friend Nancy" in Kornheiser's Washington Post Style columns.

Several frequent guests were unable to appear on the show because of their affiliation with ESPN. Kornheiser stated on air that ESPN policy barred employees and commentators from appearing on stations competing with ESPN Radio affiliates.

Kornheiser vowed to return to WTWP in 2008 and "do the radio seriously". As a tradition when quitting the show from ESPN Radio and WTEM, the last show before hiatus ended by playing "Famous Last Words" by Billy Joel. With the demise of Washington Post Radio on WTWP, and the Post affiliation being the key reason Kornheiser joined the station, it was initially unclear whether or not the show would return.

The Tony Kornheiser Show went off the air on June 27, 2008, as Kornheiser prepared for Monday Night Football. However, on August 11, 2008, because of the format change, WWWT was canceled and Bonneville stated it would no longer air The Tony Kornheiser Show.

=== WTEM (2009–2016) ===
This incarnation retained the "softcore sports talk format" from the previous one at 3WT.

The new incarnation saw the debut of several new features, including Ron Jaworski and James Carville offer their picks to select NFL and college football games every Thursday and Friday during the football season. Jaworski's picks were compared to the show's resident monkey Reginald in a showdown called "Jaws vs. the Monkey." The other running-in joke is Carville's seemingly made-up lines on sports games. In 2012, with Carville unavailable at the start of the football season, Courtney Cummz started to offer one pick to select an NFL game.

The WTEM show was available immediately after airing via podcast on iTunes. Previously, between May 27, 2011, and March 20, 2015, the show had to wait 24 hours to distribute the podcast due to contract restrictions, which was ridiculed by Kornheiser's loyal listeners, and was a frequent joke on his program.

On March 23, 2015, Kornheiser announced the podcast of his radio show would be available without a 24-hour delay.

On June 2, WTEM announced that Kornheiser would do his last show on WTEM near the end of June 2016. Kornheiser said that he would launch a podcast in September 2016. Kornheiser said in a statement, “I have loved every minute on the radio at WTEM, but I felt it was time to pursue a new and appealing challenge. I will be launching a podcast this September. I am excited that this endeavor will allow me to continue to work with so many of the people who have been a part of my radio show for over the past 20 years. But I will miss all of my friends and colleagues at WTEM.” On Kornheiser's last show, aired on June 28, 2016, Kornheiser said,

I’m gonna miss pretty much people my age, but you should understand this: the opportunity to do this, I walked away from two years left on a contact ... I don’t know what is being written or what is being said, but the truth of the matter is, I walked away with two years left on a contract, which at my age is so stupid and an indefensible position. And why did I do it? Because I thought it might be nice to see if I could get [not] people to pay for it daily, but advertisers who I could bring them a certain amount of listeners: smart, funny, affluent people all around the country. Maybe we could get ads. Maybe we could get a sponsor from all around the country.

=== Podcast-only (since 2016) ===
The show was relaunched as a podcast-only show on September 6, 2016. According to Kornheiser on June 6, 2016, the reason to do a podcast-only show was to own his content and work "someplace a little closer to my house", but the show format would still be the same as the radio show. Kornheiser said his new podcast would probably be 60 to 70 minutes instead of the 80 minutes he filled on his radio show.

The podcast-only show is produced in partnership with sports talent agency IMG and on-demand audio company DGital Media.

=== WSBN (since 2019) ===
WSBN announced it would air the Kornheisers' podcast show starting September 10, 2019.

== See also ==
- List of ESPN Radio personalities
