= WQOF =

- Washington, D.C.; United States
- Broadcast area: Metro Washington
- Frequency: 1260 kHz

Programming
- Language: English
- Format: Catholic radio
- Network: Relevant Radio

Ownership
- Owner: Relevant Radio, Inc.

History
- First air date: December 22, 1924
- Former call signs: WRHF (1924–1928); WOL (1928–1950); WWDC (1950–1999); WGAY (1999–2001); WWRC (2001–2017); WSPZ (2017–2019)
- Former frequencies: 1170 kHz (1924–1927); 940 kHz (1927); 930 kHz (1927–1928); 1310 kHz (1928–1939); 1230 kHz (1939–1941)

Technical information
- Licensing authority: FCC
- Facility ID: 8681
- Class: B
- Power: 35,000 watts (day); 5,000 watts (night)
- Transmitter coordinates: 38°59′59.4″N 77°3′25.9″W

Links
- Public license information: Public file; LMS
- Webcast: Listen live
- Website: relevantradio.com

WQOF (1260 AM) is a commercial radio station licensed to Washington, D.C., and serving the Washington metro area with a Catholic radio format. Owned and operated by Relevant Radio, WQOF's transmitter is located in Silver Spring, Maryland.

== History ==
=== Early years as WRHF and WOL ===
The station was first licensed on December 10, 1924, and made its debut broadcast twelve days later, as WRHF at 525 Eleventh Street, with 50 watts on 1170 kHz. The call sign stood for "Washington Radio Hospital Fund". Its initial daily broadcasts, lasting one hour, were "composed entirely of current events and short stories", "intended primarily for the 'shut-ins' of Washington and vicinity who are unable to read newspapers and magazines". Broadcasting equipment was a rebuilt transmitter originally intended for the YMCA building at 17th and G Streets NW. Studios were on the third floor of the Radio Parlor building at 525 11th Street NW.

The station was briefly deleted on November 28, 1925, but then reauthorized the following January 26th, still as WRHF on 1170 kHz. The next year, ownership was transferred to an insurance agent named LeRoy Mark, operating as the American Broadcasting Company, unrelated to the later network. On November 11, 1928, as part of a major reallocation due to the implementation of the Federal Radio Commission's General Order 40, the station was assigned to 1310 kHz, and at the same time changed its call sign to WOL.

WOL became the Washington network affiliate of the Mutual Broadcasting System during radio's "golden age" and fed the Fulton Lewis Jr. nightly newscast to the network. On September 22, 1938, the station increased power in conjunction with a move to 1230 kHz. In March 1941, stations on 1230 kHz, including WOL, were moved to 1260 kHz as part of the implementation of the North American Regional Broadcasting Agreement.

=== WWDC ===
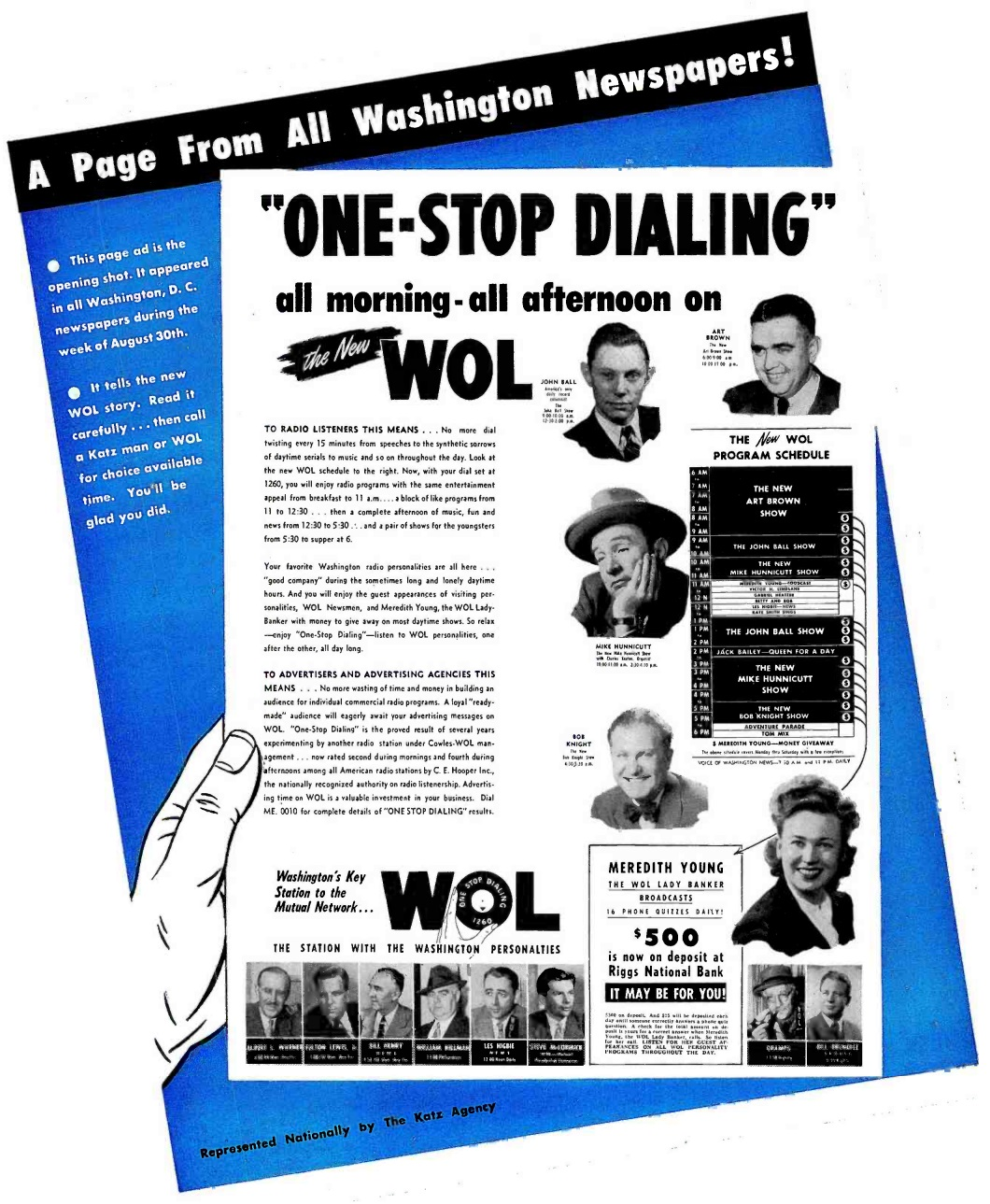
1948 station advertisement, as WOL

From 1928 until 1950 the station call sign was WOL.

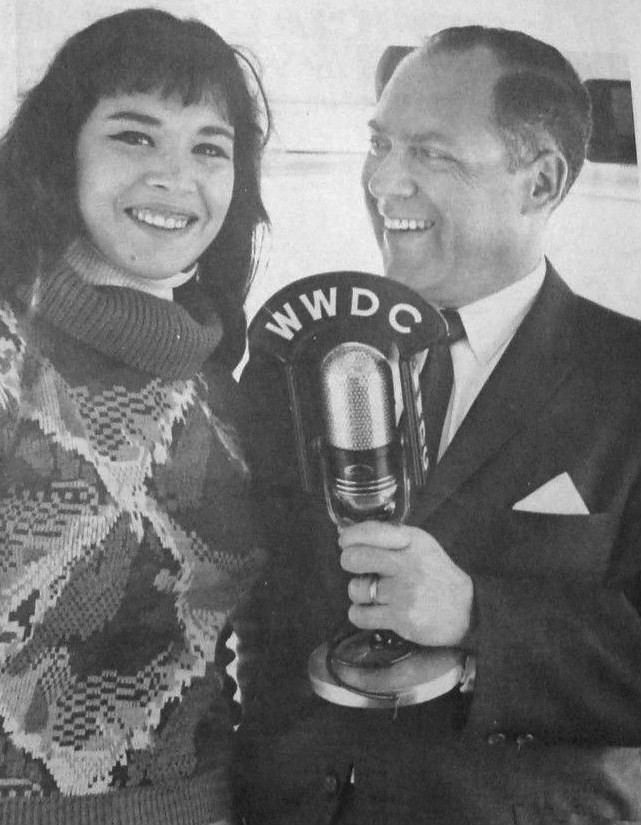
Call sign became WWDC in 1950. Fred Fiske and Gale Garnett in 1964

On January 26, 1950, the Federal Communications Commission (FCC) approved the sale of WWDC (1450 AM) by Capital Broadcasting, which had just bought WOL from Cowles Broadcasting, to Peoples Broadcasting Corporation, an affiliate of the local People's Drug Stores, and announced the two stations would be swapping call letters. The change took place February 20, 1950. WOL lost its Mutual affiliation in the process to WEAM in Arlington, Virginia. This swap moved the WWDC call letters to 1260 AM for the rest of the century.

During the 1960s, radio personalities such as Jimmy Dean and Fred Fiske had programs on this station. The format was middle-of-the-road. WWDC staked out a place in radio and music history by being the first American radio station to play a Beatles song when it aired "I Want to Hold Your Hand" in December 1963.

During the 1970s, WWDC was a moderately popular top 40 station. In 1981, the station began to simulcast of the morning and afternoon drive shows on sister FM rock station WWDC-FM ("DC101"), with separate shows and the same music format during other dayparts. In 1984, it broke off the simulcast completely and became an adult standards station. WWDC changed its call letters to WGAY in 1999, following the discontinuation of the long-time beautiful music format on WGAY-FM 99.5; that station became WJMO-FM and then WIHT.

=== Business, news, sports and progressive talk ===
Clear Channel Communications acquired 1260 AM as part of its merger with AMFM, Inc. in 2000. On April 2, 2001, the standards format was dropped, and the station switched to a business news format under the WWRC call sign. The format and call sign were moved from 570 AM, which became talk radio station WTNT. It thus inherited the legacy of another heritage Washington station, which had originally been on 980 AM before changing dial positions with WTEM in 1992. Still, there were difficulties finding a format for the station that was different from the other Clear Channel stations in the Washington metropolitan area.

In early 2003, the station ended the business format and became a full-time audio relay of CNN Headline News; the change was timed to coincide with the start of the Iraq War. That December, it changed to sports talk programming as "Sports Talk 1260", a supplement to sister station WTEM. On January 17, 2005, WWRC switched to progressive talk radio and became an Air America Radio affiliate. At the outset, WWRC simulcast Imus in the Morning with WTNT; other hosts carried during the station's progressive talk era included Lionel, Stephanie Miller, Ed Schultz, Bill Press, Rachel Maddow and Ron Reagan.

The progressive format attracted low ratings: The Washington Post reported WWRC's December 2006 ratings as "an almost imperceptible audience". The station booked a .4 rating in the summer 2008 and a .1 rating in winter 2008.

Red Zebra Broadcasting purchased WTNT, WTEM and WWRC from Clear Channel in a deal announced in 2008. On September 15, 2008, WWRC was branded as "Obama 1260" while maintaining its progressive talk format, plus news coverage from CNN and CNBC. The temporary branding was a stunt coinciding with conservative-oriented sister station WTNT's own rebranding as "McCain 570", and was expected to last throughout the 2008 presidential election. While WTNT was re-branded "Freedom 570" right after the election, WWRC retained its Obama 1260 branding beyond Illinois senator Barack Obama's Presidential inauguration on January 20, 2009.

The Washington Post reported on February 2, 2009, that WWRC would be changing to a business talk format the following week. (Although the Ed Schultz Show was moved to sister station WTNT, he would eventually be dropped from that station's lineup.) Starting on February 9, 2009, WWRC broadcast a syndicated business talk format under the brand, "Money 1260". Chiefly an outlet for the Business Talk Radio Network, the station also carried Ray Lucia and Clark Howard.

=== Salem Media and Relevant Radio ===
WWRC was sold to Salem Communications in April 2010. Upon taking control on May 15 (initially via a local marketing agreement before completing its purchase on August 3), Salem relaunched the station with its conservative talk radio format, again reviving the "WRC" branding as "1260 WRC".

Prior to Salem's purchase of WWRC, the station aired Washington Redskins and Notre Dame football games as an affiliate station. WWRC also had carried sports broadcasts dislodged from WTEM and WTNT by schedule conflicts.

In late October 2014, WWRC carried a series of promos alluding to a rebranding to occur after the 2014 midterm elections. The rebranding took place on November 4, 2014, with the station taking Salem's common major-market branding of "The Answer" as "1260 The Answer"; WWRC's programming remained unchanged following the rebrand.

On November 20, 2017, Salem moved the talk programming, "The Answer" branding, and WWRC call sign to 570 AM (the former WSPZ). Salem had purchased 570 AM from Red Zebra Broadcasting the prior May. The station spent two weeks airing a loop identifying itself as WSPZ and directing listeners to 570 AM. WSPZ then relayed the programming of Salem's WAVA-FM as a placeholder. A sale to Immaculate Heart Media was announced on March 25, 2019, at a purchase price of $750,000. The sale was consummated on May 14, 2019, with the call sign changed to WQOF on the same day. The station then began airing Relevant Radio's Catholic programming.
