= Ed Walker (radio personality) =

Radio host

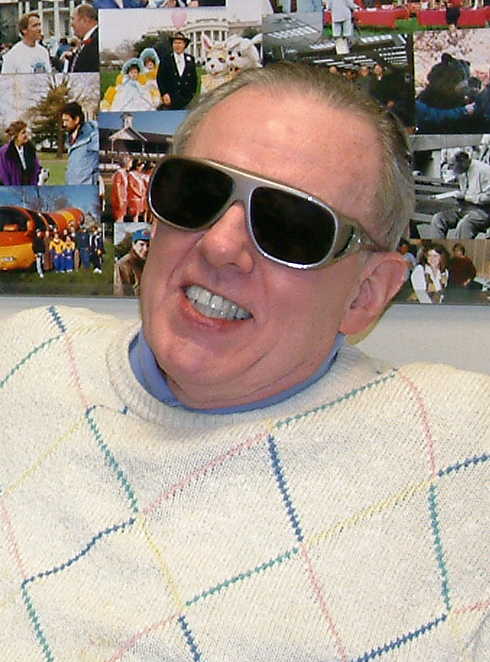
- Ed Walker in 2003
- Born: April 23, 1932; Forrest, Illinois
- Died: October 26, 2015 (aged 83); Rockville, Maryland
- Education: American University
- Occupation: Radio broadcaster
- Spouse: Nancy (1957–2015, his death)

Ed Walker (April 23, 1932 – October 26, 2015) was an American radio personality. He hosted a weekly four-hour Sunday night program, The Big Broadcast, on WAMU-FM, featuring vintage radio programs from the 1930s to 1950s, such as Gunsmoke, The Jack Benny Show, The Lone Ranger, Fibber McGee and Molly, and Superman. Walker began hosting The Big Broadcast in 1990 when his friend John Hickman discontinued hosting due to illness; the show, which started in 1964 as Recollections, was the longest running program on WAMU. The show ranked first in its timeslot, and its audience was "remarkably young for a public radio crowd."

== Career ==
Walker, who was totally blind since birth, said that while growing up "radio was my comic books, movies, everything". After graduating from Maryland School for the Blind, he was the first blind student at American University in Washington where, in 1950, he helped launch the campus radio station, WAMU-AM — the predecessor of WAMU-FM. Willard Scott joined the radio station the following year, forming a professional and personal bond with Walker that continued for his entire life. Scott said in his book, The Joy of Living, that they are "closer than most brothers". And they were brothers – fraternity brothers – at American University's Alpha Sigma Phi chapter.

From 1955 to 1974, Walker teamed with Scott as co-hosts of the nightly Joy Boys program, an improvised comedy radio show in Washington. On Joy Boys, Scott sketched a list of characters and a few lead lines setting up the situation, which Walker would commit to memory or note on his Braille typewriter. The program began on WRC-AM, an NBC owned-and-operated station, moving in 1972 to WWDC. In a 1999 article recalling the Joy Boys at the height of their popularity in the mid-1960s, The Washington Post said they "dominated Washington, providing entertainment, companionship, and community to a city on the verge of powerful change".

After the Joy Boys left the air in October 1974, Walker worked on other Washington-area radio and television stations, including WJLA-TV from 1975 until 1980, News Channel 8 in the early 1990s and WRC, hosting radio programs. He was married to Nancy, who is sighted, since 1957; they had two daughters and five grandchildren.

American University has released some of the Joy Boys radio broadcasts of the 1960s on CDs.

In 1990, Walker co-hosted WAMU's The Big Broadcast alongside his friend and colleague, the originator of the show, John R. Hickman. In January of 1991, Hickman left WAMU to care for his ailing health, and Walker took over hosting duties. Walker continued as host until 2015.

Although he rarely made appearances at conventions, Walker was a featured star at the 2007 Mid-Atlantic Nostalgia Convention in Aberdeen, Maryland.

In 2009, Ed Walker was elected to the National Radio Hall of Fame in the category "Local or Regional – Pioneer."

In late 2015, Walker was diagnosed with cancer and retired from The Big Broadcast to focus on his health and spend more time with his family. His last show aired from 7:00 to 11:00 PM on October 25, 2015. It was recorded the week before from his room at Sibley Memorial Hospital where he had been receiving treatment. He died just three hours after that last broadcast concluded.
