= WAVA (AM) =

- Arlington, Virginia; United States
- Broadcast area: Washington metropolitan area
- Frequency: 780 kHz
- Branding: AM780 WAVA

Programming
- Language: English
- Format: Christian talk radio
- Affiliations: SRN News

Ownership
- Owner: Salem Media Group; (Salem Communications Holding Corporation)
- Sister stations: WAVA-FM; WWRC

History
- First air date: November 7, 1946
- Former call signs: WARL (1946–1961); WAVA (1961–1977); WABS (1977–2005)
- Call sign meaning: Arlington, Virginia

Technical information
- Licensing authority: FCC
- Facility ID: 54465
- Class: D
- Power: 12 kW day; 9.8 kW critical hours
- Transmitter coordinates: 38°58′35.4″N 77°6′50.9″W
- Translator: 96.7 W244EB (Burke)

Links
- Public license information: Public file; LMS
- Webcast: Listen live; Listen live (via Audacy); Listen live (via iHeartRadio)
- Website: wavaam.com

WAVA is a Christian talk radio formatted broadcast radio station licensed to Arlington, Virginia, serving the metro areas of Washington metropolitan area. WAVA is owned and operated by Salem Media Group.

WAVA is a daytime-only station because 780 AM is a clear-channel frequency, on which WBBM in Chicago is the dominant Class A station. It broadcasts around the clock on FM translator W244EB, on 96.7 FM and licensed to Burke.

== History ==
This station signed on as WARL in November 1946. Pioneering country music promoter Connie B. Gay was hired as one of the station's first DJs, and convinced hesitant station management to let him start programming a daily half-hour country block. Gay recognized that the show might appeal to the large number of migrants from the Southern United States who had come to the Washington area to work in defense-related manufacturing. Within three months, Gay's Town and Country became popular enough that it had expanded to three hours, and WARL switched to playing country full time, becoming one the first stations in a large city to do so. It signed on an FM simulcast partner, WARL-FM on 105.5 (now WAVA-FM on 105.1) in 1948, allowing it to broadcast 24 hours a day.

In 1960, the two stations went bankrupt and were sold to former CBS and UPI reporter Arthur W. "Nick" Arundel, who changed their callsigns to WAVA. After the popular morning DJ at the time was killed in a car accident on the way to work, staffers began reading wire-service stories on the air, which ended up as the origin of what Arundel called the first true all-news station in the world.

WAVA and Rep. Joel Broyhill filed an antitrust complaint with the Federal Trade Commission against Washington Post-owned WTOP (then on 1500 AM, now WTOP-FM on 103.5) when that station flipped to all-news in March 1969, claiming its co-ownership with the newspaper was unfairly anti-competitive. The FTC closed the investigation in July, finding there was "no evidence of misuse of alleged monopolistic power" by WTOP.

The two stations continued as all-news until they were sold in 1977 as Arundel, who had founded Times Community Media with his 1963 purchase of Leesburg's Loudoun Times-Mirror, focused on a growing cluster of local newspapers. WAVA was sold to Radio 780, Inc., a group headed by Edwin Tornberg – later head of New World Radio, which would come to own several multicultural brokered AM stations in the Washington area – and flipped to Christian music and teaching. The callsign was changed to WABS, meaning the "Washington Area Bible Station". Salem Media Group, which had already purchased WAVA-FM in 1992, bought WABS in 1999 and changed the callsign back to WAVA in 2005.
