= WAVA-FM =

Radio station in Arlington, Virginia

- Arlington, Virginia; United States
- Broadcast area: Washington Metropolitan Area
- Frequency: 105.1 MHz (HD Radio)
- Branding: 105.1 WAVA

Programming
- Format: Christian radio
- Subchannels: HD2: Christian (WAVA); HD3: Conservative talk (WWRC)
- Affiliations: SRN News

Ownership
- Owner: Salem Media Group; (Salem Communications Holding Corporation)
- Sister stations: WAVA; WWRC

History
- First air date: August 1, 1948
- Former call signs: WARL-FM (1948–1960); WAVA-FM (1960–1978); WAVA (1978–2005)
- Former frequencies: 105.5 MHz (1948–1949)
- Call sign meaning: Washington - Arlington, Virginia

Technical information
- Licensing authority: FCC
- Facility ID: 4644
- Class: B
- Power: 33,000 watts (analog); 3,300 watts (digital)
- HAAT: 184 meters (604 ft)
- Transmitter coordinates: 38°53′30.4″N 77°7′53.9″W

Links
- Public license information: Public file; LMS
- Webcast: Listen live
- Website: www.wava.com

WAVA-FM (105.1 MHz) is a commercial radio station licensed to Arlington, Virginia, United States, and serving the Washington metro area. The station is owned and operated by the Salem Media Group, and airs a Christian talk and teaching radio format. The studios are on North Lynn Street in Arlington. Religious leaders pay WAVA-FM for their time on the air and may seek donations to support their ministries. Hosts include Chuck Swindoll, Jim Daly, John MacArthur, Michael Youssef, Greg Laurie, David Jeremiah, Alistair Begg, Charles Stanley and J. Vernon McGee.

WAVA-FM is a Class B station. It has an effective radiated power (ERP) of 33,000 watts. The transmitter is off 19th Road North, also in Arlington. WAVA-FM broadcasts in the HD Radio format. The HD2 and HD3 subchannels rebroadcast two co-owned AM stations, WAVA 780 AM and WWRC 570 AM. WAVA 780 also carries a Christian talk and teaching format, but with different shows. WWRC airs conservative talk.

== History ==
=== WARL-FM ===
In 1948, Northern Virginia Broadcasters, Inc., which owned WARL (780 AM, now WAVA), received a Federal Communications Commission construction permit to put an FM radio station on the air. On August 1, the station first signed on as WARL-FM. It was originally located at 105.5 MHz on the FM dial and was powered at only 1,000 watts. WARL-FM mostly simulcast its sister station, which was one of the first large-market stations to play country music full-time. Because the AM station was a daytimer, WARL-FM was able to continue airing the stations' programming after sunset, even though few radio listeners owned FM receivers in those days.

In 1949, WARL-FM switched to its current frequency at 105.1 MHz. This was followed by power upgrades to 2.9 kW in 1950 and 20 kW in 1960.

=== All-news ===
In 1960, the two stations went bankrupt and were sold to former CBS and UPI reporter Arthur W. "Nick" Arundel, who changed their callsigns to WAVA and WAVA-FM. After the popular morning DJ at the time was killed in a car accident on the way to work, staffers began reading wire-service stories on the air, which ended up as the origin of what Arundel called the first true all-news station in the world.

WAVA and Rep. Joel Broyhill filed an antitrust complaint with the Federal Trade Commission against Washington Post-owned WTOP (then on 1500 AM, now WTOP-FM on 103.5) when that station flipped to all-news in March 1969, claiming its co-ownership with the newspaper was unfairly anti-competitive. The FTC closed the investigation in July, finding there was "no evidence of misuse of alleged monopolistic power" by WTOP.

=== Rock era ===
In 1977, the two stations were sold: AM 780 was sold to Radio 780, Inc., and flipped to Christian music and teaching as WABS, while FM 105.1 kept the WAVA call letters and was sold to the WAVA Limited Partnership, a group headed by Alex Sheftell, formerly an executive with the Washington Star's broadcasting properties (WMAL-AM-FM-TV). It flipped to a soft rock format. After three years of low ratings, in 1980, WAVA-FM switched its format to AOR, branded as Rockradio 105 WAVA. However, the new format also failed to gain many listeners. Doubleday Broadcasting Co., a subsidiary of publisher Doubleday and Company, bought the station in 1982 and planned a format flip.

=== Top 40 ===
On October 28, 1983, WAVA-FM switched to a CHR/Top 40 format, the first FM station to play all the hits in the D.C. market. Branded by the monikers as All Hit 105 WAVA, HitRadio 105 WAVA, and Music Power 105 WAVA, it was one of D.C.'s top-rated FM stations.

In 1986, WAVA was acquired by Emmis Broadcasting. In 1992, due to financial problems after the purchase of the Seattle Mariners, Emmis decided to sell many of its stations at lower-than-market-value prices.

=== Salem Media ownership ===
WAVA-FM was sold to the Salem Media Group for $20 million. On February 12, 1992, at midnight, after playing a montage of station memories, WAVA went off the air, with "Goodbye" by Night Ranger as the final song.

The station returned to the air the next day, stunting with contemporary Christian music. A few days later, it adopted a Christian talk and teaching format. Salem Media owns dozens of Christian stations across the country, but most are on the AM dial. WAVA-FM and KKLA-FM Los Angeles are the only Salem FM stations in large cities broadcasting a Christian talk and teaching format.
