= List of radio stations in Washington, D.C. =

The Washington metropolitan area is currently the seventh-largest radio market in the United States. While most stations originate within Washington, D.C. proper, this list includes also stations that originate from Northern Virginia and Annapolis, Maryland.

Currently, radio stations that primarily serve the Washington metropolitan area include:

== Broadcast radio ==
=== AM stations ===
Call sign	Frequency	Band	City of license	Format	Notes
WWRC	570	AM	Bethesda, MD	Conservative talk	
WSBN	630	AM	Washington, D.C.	Sports	
WDMV	700	AM	Walkersville, MD	Regional Mexican	^{2}
WTNT	730	AM	Alexandria, VA	Spanish adult hits	
WAVA	780	AM	Arlington, VA	Christian	^{2}
WACA	900	AM	Laurel, MD	Spanish talk	
WURA	920	AM	Quantico, VA	Tejano	
WCTN	950	AM	Potomac, MD	Spanish contemporary	
WTEM	980	AM	Washington, D.C.	Sports	
WWGB	1030	AM	Indian Head, MD	Spanish religious	^{2}
WHFS	1050	AM	Silver Spring, MD	Freeform	
WUST	1120	AM	Washington, D.C.	Black Information Network	^{2}
WMET	1160	AM	Gaithersburg, MD	Guadalupe-EWTN	
WNDC	1190	AM	Leesburg, VA		
WFAX	1220	AM	Falls Church, VA	Regional Mexican/reggaeton	
WQOF	1260	AM	Washington, D.C.	Relevant Radio	
WDCT	1310	AM	Fairfax, VA	Korean	
WYCB	1340	AM	Washington, D.C.	Gospel	
WZHF	1390	AM	Capitol Heights, MD	Regional Mexican	
WOL	1450	AM	Washington, D.C.	Urban talk	
WKDV	1460	AM	Manassas, VA	Regional Mexican	
WPWC	1480	AM	Dumfries, VA	Spanish Christian	
WFED	1500	AM	Washington, D.C.	Government talk	^{1}
WDON	1540	AM	Wheaton, MD	Spanish Catholic	^{2}
WJFK	1580	AM	Morningside, MD	Sports/betting	
WLXE	1600	AM	Rockville, MD	Spanish	

^{1} clear-channel station
^{2} daytime-only station

=== FM stations ===
Call sign	Frequency	Band	City of license	Format	Notes
WDCN-LD	87.7	FM	Fairfax, VA	Spanish tropical	
WAMU	88.5	FM	Washington, D.C.	NPR/talk	*
WPFW	89.3	FM	Washington, D.C.	Pacifica/jazz	*
WPIR	89.9	FM	Culpeper, VA	Contemporary Christian	*
WCSP-FM	90.1	FM	Washington, D.C.	C-SPAN	*
WMUC-FM	90.5	FM	College Park, MD	College/freeform	*
WETA	90.9	FM	Washington, D.C.	NPR/classical	*
WGTS	91.9	FM	Takoma Park, MD	Contemporary Christian	*
WPRS	92.7	FM	Prince Frederick, MD	Gospel	
WKYS	93.9	FM	Washington, D.C.	Urban contemporary	
WLZV	94.3	FM	Buckland, VA	K-Love	*
WOWD-LP	94.3	FM	Takoma Park, MD	Community Radio	
WIAD	94.7	FM	Bethesda, MD	Classic hits	
WPGC-FM	95.5	FM	Morningside, MD	Urban contemporary	
WHUR-FM	96.3	FM	Washington, D.C.	Urban AC	
WASH	97.1	FM	Washington, D.C.	Adult contemporary	
WMZQ-FM	98.7	FM	Washington, D.C.	Country	
WDCH-FM	99.1	FM	Bowie, MD	Bloomberg Radio	
WIHT	99.5	FM	Washington, D.C.	Contemporary hit radio	
WBIG-FM	100.3	FM	Washington, D.C.	Classic rock	
WWDC	101.1	FM	Washington, D.C.	Alternative rock	
WMMJ	102.3	FM	Bethesda, MD	Urban AC	
WTOP-FM	103.5	FM	Washington, D.C.	All-news	
WTLP	103.9	FM	Braddock Heights, MD	WTOP-FM simulcast	
WLNO	104.1	FM	Waldorf, MD	Latin pop	
WAVA-FM	105.1	FM	Arlington, VA	Christian	
WMAL-FM	105.9	FM	Woodbridge, VA	Conservative talk	
WJFK-FM	106.7	FM	Manassas, VA	Sports	
WLVW	107.3	FM	Washington, D.C.	K-Love	*
WWWT-FM	107.7	FM	Manassas, VA	WTOP-FM simulcast	
WLZL	107.9	FM	Annapolis, MD	Spanish tropical	

Asterisk (*) indicates a non-commercial (public radio/campus/educational) broadcast.

=== Defunct ===
- NAA/Arlington, VA (1913–41)
- NOF/Naval Air Station, Anacostia (1920–23)
- WCAP/Washington, D.C. (1926–26; merged into WRC, now WTEM)
- WDM/Washington, D.C. (1921–25)
- WDW/Washington, D.C. (1921–22)
- WDVM/WDMV/WGOP/Pocomoke City, Maryland (1955-2025)
- WINX—WOOK—WFAN/Washington, D.C. (1940–78)
- WHFS/Washington, D.C./Baltimore, MD (1961–2005)
- WJH/Washington, D.C. (1921–24)
- WQAW/Washington, D.C. (1923–24)
- WRCW/Warrenton, Virginia (1957-2025)

== Bibliography ==
- Jack Alicoate, ed. (1939), "District of Columbia", Radio Annual, New York: Radio Daily, OCLC 2459636 – via Internet Archive
- Chas. A. Alicoate, ed. (1957), "Amplitude Modulation Stations - AM: Dist. of Columbia", Radio Annual and Television Yearbook, New York: Radio Daily Corp., OCLC 10512206 – via Internet Archive
- "AM Stations in the U.S.: Dist. of Columbia", Radio Annual Television Year Book, New York: Radio Television Daily, 1963, OCLC 10512375 – via Internet Archive
