= WOOK =

WOOK may refer to:

- WOOK-LD, a low-power television station (channel 15, virtual 21) licensed to serve Meridian, Mississippi, United States
- WBIG-FM, a radio station (100.3 FM) licensed to serve Washington, D.C., United States, which held the call sign WOOK from 1976 to 1984
- WOOK-TV, a defunct television station (channel 14) formerly licensed to serve Washington, D.C.
- WOOK (AM), a defunct radio station (1340 AM) formerly licensed to serve Washington, D.C.
- WLXE, a radio station (1600 AM) licensed to serve Rockville, Maryland, United States, which held the call sign WOOK from 1947 to 1951
- Tim Wook (born 1995), German politician
