= WGMS =

WGMS may refer to:

- WGMS-FM, a now-defunct station in Washington, D.C. that broadcast from 1947 until 2005 at 103.5 FM (and from 2005 to 2007 at 103.9/104.1 FM) with a classical music format.
- The current WGMS (FM)/89.1, a Hagerstown, Maryland station that simulcasts Washington D.C. public radio station WETA-FM.
- The World Glacier Monitoring Service
- Whispering gallery modes (WGMs)
- Worlds Greatest Music Station (or WGMS 1332) - former Greater Peterborough, UK, radio station (1992-1994)
