= WXTR =

WXTR may refer to:

- WXTR (FM), a radio station (89.9 FM) licensed to serve Tappahannock, Virginia, United States
- One of several radio stations in the Washington, D.C. market:
  - WPRS-FM, 104.1 FM, Waldorf, Maryland, which used the callsign WXTR-FM from 1981 through 1996
  - WSHE (AM), 820 AM, Frederick, Maryland, which used the callsign WXTR from 1996 through 2006
  - WTNT (AM), 730 AM, Alexandria, Virginia, which used the callsign WXTR from 2006 through 2010
