= List of radio stations in Washington =

List of radio stations in Washington may refer to:

- List of radio stations in Washington (state)
- List of radio stations in Washington, D.C.
