= WPGC-FM =

Mainstream urban radio station in Morningside, Maryland, serving Washington, DC

- Morningside, Maryland; United States
- Broadcast area: Washington–Baltimore metropolitan area
- Frequency: 95.5 MHz (HD Radio)
- Branding: WPGC 95.5

Programming
- Language: English
- Format: Urban contemporary
- Subchannels: HD2: WJFK-FM simulcast

Ownership
- Owner: Audacy, Inc.; (Audacy License, LLC)
- Sister stations: WDCH-FM; WIAD; WJFK; WJFK-FM; WLZL; WTEM

History
- First air date: January 18, 1948
- Former call signs: WBUZ (1948–1956); WRNC (1956–1958); WPGC-FM (1958–1985); WCLY (1985–1987)
- Former frequencies: 96.7 MHz (1948–1954)
- Call sign meaning: Prince George's County

Technical information
- Licensing authority: FCC
- Facility ID: 26832
- Class: B
- ERP: 50,000 watts
- HAAT: 148 meters (486 ft)
- Transmitter coordinates: 38.864°N 76.911°W

Links
- Public license information: Public file; LMS
- Webcast: Listen live (via Audacy); Listen live (via iHeartRadio)
- Website: www.audacy.com/wpgc

WPGC-FM (95.5 MHz) is a commercial FM radio station licensed to Morningside, Maryland, and serving the Washington–Baltimore metropolitan area. It is owned by Audacy, Inc., and airs an urban contemporary format.

WPGC-FM has studios in the Navy Yard neighborhood of Southeast D.C., with its transmitter located off Walker Mill Road at Tanow Place in Capitol Heights, Maryland. In 2005, WPGC began broadcasting in IBOC digital radio, using the HD Radio system from iBiquity. The HD2 digital subchannel carries a simulcast of WJFK-FM.

== History ==
=== WBUZ ===
The station signed on the air on January 18, 1948, at 7 a.m., on 96.7 MHz with the call sign WBUZ. WBUZ was owned by Arthur Baldwin Curtis, president of Chesapeake Broadcasting Company, Incorporated, and was located in Bradbury Heights. WBUZ-FM broadcasting with an effective radiated power of 420 watts. The call letters were a play on the word "bus", as WBUZ broadcast background music for a Prince George's County, Maryland–based bus company.

In May 1953, WBUZ-FM raised power to 6,300 watts and its city of license was changed to Oakland, Maryland (near District Heights; not the Western Maryland town). Then on June 8, 1953, the Federal Communications Commission (FCC) granted a permit to the station to raise power from 6.3 to 18 kilowatts. WBUZ-FM changed frequency from 96.7 to 95.5 MHz and power was reduced to 16.5 kilowatts from a new transmitter and tower site on Walker Mill Road in Oakland. The calls were changed to WRNC on March 30, 1956. By the end of the year, WRNC was simulcasting WPGC (1580 AM). The ERP was reduced to 15.7 kilowatts while the power increase authorized for WPGC (AM) in 1955 to 10,000 watts daytime only.

=== Top 40/"Classy 95" ===
WPGC-AM, Inc., purchased WRNC in 1956. The calls were changed to WPGC-FM in March 1958. WPGC-FM temporarily went silent until February 1959, as new studios were being constructed for the top 40 format. Though the calls have always stood for Prince George's County for the county Morningside resides in, during the 1970s and early 1980s an alternate contest slogan had them standing for Where People Get Cash on-air.

WPGC-FM maintained some form of the top 40 format (skewed from rock 'n' roll-based to adult contemporary) until 1984, when it flipped to easy listening/adult contemporary. For two years, the station took the calls WCLY and was known on-air as "Classy 95".

WPGC logo from 1996 to 2009

=== Hip hop/R&B ===
Classy 95 ended up being a failure, and First Media sold its radio stations off to Cook Inlet Radio Partners, a group of Alaska Natives for $177 million in 1987. Cook Inlet returned the WPGC-FM calls on the weekend after Memorial Day on May 30, 1987. The first song under the new format was "Jam On It" by Newcleus, and the new CHR format with an urban lean became much more popular. The station was initially branded WPGC, 95 Jams. In the early 2000s, the branding reverted to simply WPGC 95.5, dropping the Jams moniker from the brand, although it still visibly remained on the station's logo. In August 2009, the station rebranded again to 95-5 PGC.

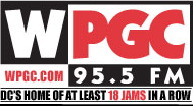
WPGC-FM logo from 2011 to January 2020

Donnie Simpson hosted The Donnie Simpson Morning Show during the morning drive from March 1993 to January 29, 2010.

Infinity Broadcasting acquired the station and sister station WPGC from Cook Inlet in June 1994 for $60 million. The stations moved to new studios and offices at 4200 Parliament Place, Suite 300 in Lanham, Maryland, in the summer of 2000. In January 2006 owner Viacom split into two companies, Viacom and CBS Corporation, and the Infinity Broadcasting name was dropped in favor of CBS Radio.

WPGC announced they were moving their studios from Parliament Place in Lanham in suburban Maryland to the Navy Yard neighborhood in southeast DC on March 26, 2015.

On February 2, 2017, CBS Radio announced it would merge with Entercom. The merger was approved on November 9, 2017, and was consummated on November 17.

=== Programming history ===
Similar to other long-time rhythmic turned urban stations including KMEL in San Francisco and WQHT in New York City, WPGC has evolved into a full-service urban contemporary station that is still monitored by Nielsen BDS as a rhythmic. WPGC-FM also has been a debated topic amongst radio experts about its format classification as a Rhythmic Contemporary Hit radio station even though it really operates musically and programmed as an Urban Contemporary. In 1987, when the current format on WPGC was introduced it was a mix of R&B, hip-hop, dance and pop titles. This came at a time when many radio stations took on the "crossover"-based format for the first time as Emmis Communications pioneered it on KPWR in Los Angeles and WQHT in New York upon acquiring those stations. In the case of Washington, D.C., the new format niched in well with established R&B stations WKYS, WMMJ and WOL as well as top 40 stations (at the time) WRQX and WAVA-FM.

By 1997, following the departure of longtime assistant program director/music director and afternoon host Albie Dee, its playlist consisted mainly of R&B and hip-hop titles. Many critics say the ability to attract more mainstream advertisers as Rhythmic, rather than Urban, is the real reason. By the early 2000s, WPGC was regularly airing go-go, a local sub-genre of funk, soul, and R&B, made popular by live performers including Chuck Brown, Experience Unlimited, and Rare Essence in local clubs and performance venues.

In June 2009, speculation began circulating that WPGC might be evolving towards a Top 40/CHR direction or back to its former urban-leaning Rhythmic format similar to sister station WZMX. The move might have been fueled by the recent drop in the ratings and in part due to the introduction of PPMs in the market, where it has hurt them audience-wise. However, WPGC remained an urban, albeit a mainstream urban (in terms of programming and music playlist, although still basically considered a rhythmic), that focuses primarily on the current urban hits with some recurrents and throwbacks mixed into its playlist.

In December 2010, WPGC began to open up its playlist to include songs that they would not have touched, i.e. Just The Way You Are from Bruno Mars. Even though WPGC-FM was still considered as a rhythmic, it added more rhythmic-friendly tracks but reduced the urban lean from 2010 to 2018.

From 1992 to 1997, WPGC was an original member of the BDS Rhythmic Top 40 panel, when it was moved to BDS's R&B/Hip-Hop reporting panel in 1997. It was the only Rhythmic owned by then CBS Radio that was not listed on the Nielsen BDS rhythmic panel. From 1997 to 2012, Nielsen BDS placed WPGC-FM on the urban panel, while it remained on the rhythmic panel on Mediabase, as Radio One's WKYS is its competitor, but is an urban contemporary station. On June 13, 2012, WPGC returned to the Nielsen BDS Rhythmic Top 40 panel after 15 years. CBS Radio moved WPGC to the Rhythmic panel from the R&B/Hip-Hop panel due to WPGC becoming more of a hit-driven Rhythmic Top 40 that is more in line with their other Rhythmic outlets and to be more competitive with Top 40/CHR rival WIHT. However, it retained a heavy urban lean to programming when compared to most rhythmic-formatted stations on the panel. Ironically, they were also the second CBS Radio Rhythmic outlet on the BDS Rhythmic panel with a R&B/Hip-Hop direction, the other being WZMX-Hartford, Connecticut.

WPGC is considered the 2nd largest and co-flagship (along with WVEE) owned by Audacy within its urban/rhythmic division, based on market size (Washington, DC #8). Until August 2012, CBS Radio did list WPGC as an urban on their corporate listings, but by 2012, it was programmed as a hybrid of both formats. As a result, Atlanta (market rank #7) sister station, WVEE, is considered the largest urban station from 2012 to 2018 and again in 2023, but WVEE is still the co-flagship of the company's urban/rhythmic division. As of January 2018, Entercom did list WPGC-FM as an urban on their station listings, making WPGC an urban station once again.

As of April 2021, Mediabase does monitor WPGC-FM as an urban on its weekly station panel.

== Current programming ==
Currently, WPGC is musically programmed as a hit-driven, full-service, urban contemporary station that spins a heavy concentration of mainly contemporary hip-hop, soul, go-go and R&B music with numerous urban music throwbacks throughout the day and an occasional crossover pop hit song. The station directly competes with urban contemporary rival WKYS and urban adult contemporary rivals WMMJ and WHUR full-time, and to a lesser extent the station competes with contemporary hit radio rival WIHT. The station airs current and classic R&B and soul slow jams late nights on Sunday through Thursday dubbed The Coolout. After many years of only giving occasional spins to urban contemporary gospel music that charted well on the Billboard, the station added a program dedicated to the genre on early Sunday mornings. The station also airs urban and crossover pop music throwbacks on Sunday evenings.

The station's signal covers both Washington and Baltimore, so it also competes with Baltimore's WERQ, an Urban One-owned urban contemporary station, and to a lesser extent, iHeartMedia's WZFT which has a more generic Top 40/CHR format. It is the only Audacy rhythmic/urban in the Eastern United States to use its call letters as a branding on-air (the other two, KSFM in Sacramento and KLUC-FM in Las Vegas, are both in the Western United States).

The station is an official sponsor of the Prince George's Film Festival.

== Notable on-air personalities ==
- Big Tigger - former personality that hosted the afternoon drive, nights, and morning drive shows various times throughout the 1990s, 2000s through 2011
- Joe Clair – former morning drive host from 2015 to 2021
- Free (rapper) - former morning drive co-host
- Lil' Mo - former afternoon drive host
- Donnie Simpson - former morning drive show host from 1993 to 2010
- Albie Dee - former afternoon drive show host; voice actor
- Paco Lopez - former afternoon drive show host; actor
- Christina Kelley - former mid-day show host; voice actor
- Doug Lazy - former show host; music producer
- Jessie Collins - former weekend show host; television producer

=== HD programming ===
- HD2: In March 2006, WPGC launched a HD2 subchannel, which featured a format geared to local hip-hop and R&B artists under the billing "Crank". However, by September 2011, the format was replaced with a Dance Top 40 format, billed as "Area 955". In 2021, the format would be replaced with a simulcast of sister station WJFK-FM.
- HD3 had been a simulcast of WJFK (1580 AM). That service was later discontinued.

== See also ==
- WIHT
- WKYS
- KMEL
- WVEE
- WZMX
