= Donnie After Dark =

- Genre: Variety-talk show
- Written by: Ayana Reece; Norm Vance, Jr.; Lee Harris
- Directed by: Monte Johnson; Tony McCuin
- Creative director: Bart Phillips
- Presented by: Donnie Simpson
- Theme music composer: Buckhead Beats; Dennis Allen
- Country of origin: United States
- Original language: English
- No. of seasons: 2
- No. of episodes: 6

Production
- Executive producers: Bart Phillips; Donnie Simpson; Eric Tomosunas
- Camera setup: Multi-camera
- Running time: 60 minutes
- Production company: Donnie Simpson Productions

Original release
- Network: TV One
- Release: February 5 – December 18, 2016

Donnie After Dark is an American television late-night talk show hosted by Donnie Simpson, which premiered on TV One on February 5, 2016, and aired on Sundays at 11:00 p.m. EST until December 2016.

== Overview ==
=== Season 1 ===
The first Season of Donnie After Dark included two episodes which were taped at the Xen Lounge in Los Angeles, California. In addition to Donnie Simpson as the host, the regular cast included co-host DJ Traci Steele (of Love & Hip Hop: Atlanta), along with the show's official house band—the all-girl Atlanta-based group "The GGs Band".

The show's debut episode aired on February 5, 2016 on TV One with guest appearances by Jimmy Jam, Terry Lewis, Jazmine Sullivan, Lalah Hathaway, Kirk Franklin, and Tasha Smith. The second episode aired on June 1, 2016 with guest appearances by Kenny Lattimore, Tisha Campbell, Duane Martin, Danielle Nicolet, and Brandon T. Jackson. Donnie Simpson and Majic 102.3 held a viewing party of the second episode on June 1, 2016 at the SoBe Restaurant & Lounge in Lanham, Maryland.

=== Season 2 ===
The second season of Donnie After Dark was taped in Atlanta, Georgia with a live-studio audience in attendance, and included a total of 4 episodes. DJ Traci Steele returned as the co-host and social media expert, along with The GGs Band as the official house band.

Season 2 premiered on November 24, 2016, and included guest appearances by Angela Robinson, Pooch Hall, D.C. Young Fly, and a musical performance by Ro James. The guest list for the remaining episodes included: David Banner, Jamilah Lemieux, V. Bozeman, Jermaine Dupri, LisaRaye McCoy, Erica Ash, R&B group 112, Deontay Wilder, Naturi Naughton, comedian Tony Roberts, and Musiq Soulchild.
