= WCTN =

- Potomac–Cabin John, Maryland; United States
- Broadcast area: Washington metropolitan area
- Frequency: 950 kHz
- Branding: Auténtica 950

Programming
- Language: Spanish
- Format: Adult contemporary

Ownership
- Owner: WIN Radio Broadcasting Corporation

History
- First air date: November 1971
- Former call signs: WXLN (1964–1973)
- Call sign meaning: "Christ To the Nation"

Technical information
- Licensing authority: FCC
- Facility ID: 59711
- Class: D
- Power: 2,500 watts (day); 350 watts (night)
- Transmitter coordinates: 39°02′12″N 77°12′09″W
- Translator: 94.3 W232DE (Potomac)

Links
- Public license information: Public file; LMS

WCTN is a Spanish hits radio station broadcasting on 950 kHz in the medium-wave AM band from Potomac, Maryland.

== History ==
Seven Locks Broadcasting Company obtained a construction permit for station WXLN on July 1, 1964. Seven Locks was beset by financial problems; the permit was initially applied for in 1958 but faced delays due to ownership changes, and the deadline to construct was extended ten times between 1964 and 1971. WXLN went on the air in November 1971, with an adult standards format, but was forced to suspend operations May 26, 1972, due to bankruptcy.

The station was sold to Christ Church, Washington Parish in February 1973, who put the station back on the air that May 21 with one of the first contemporary Christian music formats in the nation.

In July 1983, WCTN's license renewal was challenged by a Montgomery County, Maryland-based group who contended that the religious programming did not effectively serve the interests of the whole public; the group proposed a full-service station focusing on the county instead. The proceeding was dismissed and the license renewal granted in November. The church sold the station to CTN Productions, Inc. in 1986.

In 2003, WCTN was sold again to Dr. Richard Yoon's WIN Radio Broadcasting Corporation for $1.65 million. Under WIN, the station ran a variety of Korean language and Spanish language programming, both religious and secular; its final format during this time was Spanish adult contemporary music.

On July 23, 2026, WOOK Radio DC, Inc., led by William Tucker, Jr., bought WCTN for $800,000. The group's goal is to resurrect WOOK, a pioneering rhythm and blues station that broadcast to Washington on 1340 AM (now WYCB) from 1951 through 1976.

== Translator ==
WCTN signed on FM translator W232DE (94.3 MHz) on August 30, 2017. This translator immediately drew interference complaints from WOWD-LP, also broadcasting on 94.3 to nearby Takoma Park, Maryland, who also alleged that WIN Radio had installed a different antenna than that which was authorized. WIN Radio did not respond to any of the complaints or inquiries from the FCC. As a translator is not allowed to cause any interference to another station, its license application was dismissed on May 8, 2018, and WIN Radio was ordered to immediately cease its operation. The translator returned to air a year later; WOWD-LP dropped its complaints, though WIN Radio admitted it had installed an unauthorized antenna and was fined $7,500 for the rule violation. WIN Radio currently holds a construction permit to move to 101.5 FM, which would alleviate interference with both WOWD-LP and WLZV.

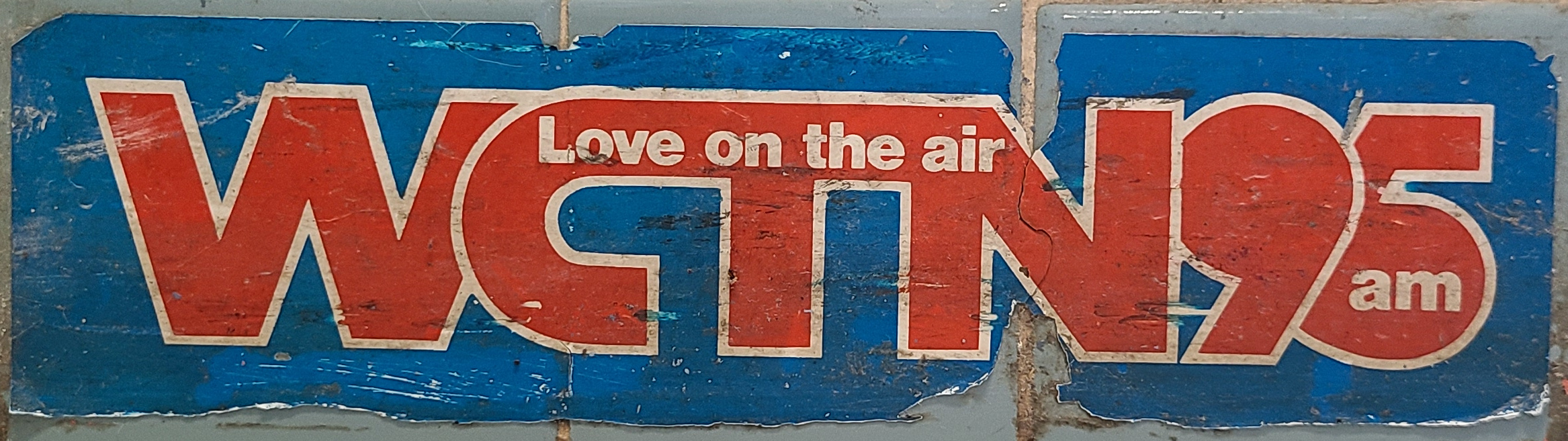
WCTN 95AM Bumper sticker, circa 1973
