= WIHT =

Contemporary hit radio station in Washington, DC

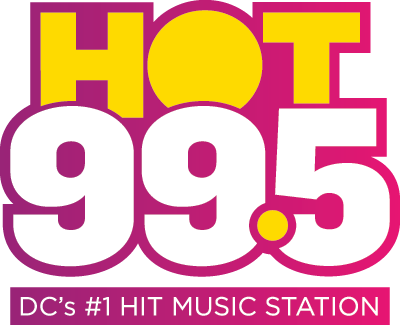
- Washington, D.C.; United States
- Broadcast area: Washington metropolitan area
- Frequency: 99.5 MHz (HD Radio)
- RDS: HOT995
- Branding: HOT 99-5

Programming
- Format: Contemporary hit radio
- Subchannels: HD2: Pride Radio (Top 40–dance radio)
- Affiliations: iHeartRadio; Premiere Networks

Ownership
- Owner: iHeartMedia; (iHM Licenses, LLC)
- Sister stations: WASH; WBIG-FM; WMZQ-FM; WUST; WWDC

History
- First air date: 1960
- Former call signs: WGAY (1960–1971); WGAY-FM (1971–1993); WGAY (1993–1995); WEBR (1995–1996); WGAY (1996–1999); WGAY-FM (1999); WJMO-FM (1999–2001)
- Call sign meaning: anagram of "hit"

Technical information
- Licensing authority: FCC
- Facility ID: 25080
- Class: B
- ERP: 22,000 watts
- HAAT: 229 meters (751 ft)
- Transmitter coordinates: 38.964°N 77.105°W

Links
- Public license information: Public file; LMS
- Webcast: Listen live (via iHeartRadio)
- Website: hot995.iheart.com; HD2: prideradiodc.iheart.com

WIHT (99.5 FM) is a contemporary hit radio formatted radio station that serves the greater Washington metropolitan area. Located on the fourth floor of 1801 Rockville Pike in Rockville, Maryland, the station broadcasts 24 hours a day and is licensed to, and owned by, iHeartMedia. The transmitter is located on River Road in Bethesda, Maryland.

== History ==
=== Early years (1960s–1999) ===
WGAY-FM signed on in 1960 as an FM simulcast partner to WGAY (1050 AM). An apocryphal story claims the station was named for its owner at the time, country music promoter Connie B. Gay, though in reality the WGAY callsign was first assigned in 1946 and long predated his ownership. The two stations were located in Silver Spring, Maryland, and ran a beautiful music format in the 1960s and 1970s, which evolved to an easy listening format by the 1980s (though it would initially air a country music format for a year when it signed on in 1960). During that era, WGAY-FM typically simulcast its AM sister station, by then known as WQMR "Washington's Quality Music Radio". Eventually, the FM came to be considered the primary signal, and WGAY would often finish at number one in the Persons 12+ Arbitron radio ratings for the Washington, D.C. area during the 1970s and 1980s.

Television ads for the station in the 1970s and 1980s featured station programmer Bob Chandler relaxing in a recliner, while listening to his station's light mix of music playing in the background. During the 1980s, WGAY was reported to be then President Ronald Reagan's favorite radio station. WGAY was one of the last remaining major-market easy listening stations in the United States, as the format, which targeted older demographics, evolved towards a more mainstream adult contemporary format, or was dropped altogether.

At midnight on December 26, 1991, WGAY changed branding to "Easy 99.5", and shifted towards mainstream AC.

David Burd of WASH-FM and Beverly Fox of WARW became the new morning hosts in 1994, replacing Steve Schy.

On September 1, 1995, at 8 am, WGAY re-branded as "Star 99.5", shifted towards hot AC, and announced plans to change its call sign. The "Star" name was dropped by the end of the month, following a lawsuit by WSMD-FM in Mechanicsville, Maryland (which has branded as "Star 98.3" since 1988); the station then took on the "Bright 99.5" branding, and changed its call sign to WEBR in November. Listeners did not accept the more up-tempo music, and the station switched back to branding themselves under the WGAY calls, though with a soft rock format, on June 24, 1996.

=== Jam'n 99.5 (1999–2001) ===
WGAY switched from the still ratings successful format permanently by the late 1990s, although not because its listeners were too few, but because demographically, they were getting too old and therefore less desirable for radio advertisers. At 2 pm on April 13, 1999, "Evergreen" by Barbra Streisand was faded out with a liner touting a change, bringing the end to WGAY. After three days of simulcasting sister stations WTJM in New York City, KCMG in Los Angeles, and WUBT in Chicago, the station changed to an rhythmic oldies format at 3 pm on April 16, known as WJMO-FM ("Jam'n 99.5"). At the time, they were co-owned with AM station WJMO in Cleveland, Ohio. The format lasted for almost two years. However, with ratings on the decline due to the arguable burnout factor of the music, combined with competition from WBIG-FM (which at the time played an oldies format; they now play a classic rock format), Clear Channel Communications (now iHeartMedia), (who acquired the station in 2000, due to a merger with AMFM Media and had dropped the format in other markets due to similar factors) decided to take the station in a different direction. Unlike other stations that dropped the format, however, WJMO gave its listeners the weekend to say goodbye.

=== Hot 99.5 (2001–present) ===
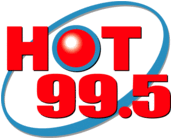
WIHT's station logo from April 2001 to September 2014.

"Jam'n" signed off at 7 am on April 2, 2001; the last song played on "Jam'n" was "Last Dance" by Donna Summer. That was followed by a "Survivor Radio 99.5" stunt before the current contemporary hit radio format debuted as "Hot 99-5" at 5 pm on April 6. The first song on "Hot" was "Survivor" by Destiny's Child. With the change of format came a change in call sign to the current WIHT on April 18.

At the time, the only CHR station in the market was the relatively popular WWZZ (104.1 FM), which was hampered by a transmitter located in Waldorf, Maryland, southeast of Washington, that had difficulty covering the entire market; at WIHT's launch, some of its on-air material repeatedly jabbed WWZZ for its "continuous, annoying static". WWZZ moved toward a modern AC direction in late 2001, before being driven out of the format entirely by a series of frequency swaps just five years later. The station was also considered to be Baltimore's default Top 40 station since their previous Top 40 station, WXYV (102.7 FM, now WQSR), would flip in September 2001, and promos for Clear Channel's Baltimore stations would occasionally air on WIHT. (Baltimore finally got a Top 40 station in November 2009, when sister station WCHH flipped from modern rock to Top 40 as "Z 104-3".) The station's main competitors were Audacy's combination of urban-leaning Rhythmic Contemporary WPGC-FM 95.5 and for years adult Top 40 WIAD ("94.7 Fresh FM", now classic hits "94.7 The Drive"), and Cumulus Media's adult top 40 WRQX ("Mix 107.3", now K-Love station WLVW).

=== HD Programming ===
WIHT-FM's HD Radio HD2 format was flipped to iHeartMedia's successful Pride Radio format at midnight on July 16, 2013, replacing the "Hot Spot"-branded "New! Music" format that had been running on the HD2 signal since 2007.

==== The Kane Show ====
Kane resigned from his programming position at WFLZ in Tampa on October 31, 2006, to start "The Kane Show" during the morning drive programming block on WIHT. He replaced the existing show The Hot Morning Mess with Mark Kaye, Kris Gamble and producer Ron Ross, who exited the station on November 1, 2006. The Kane Show officially hit the Washington, D.C.-area airwaves on November 13.

The show originally started off with Kane as the host and Sarah Fraser and Samy K as his co-hosts. After Samy left the show in August 2011, to work on his musical career with his band, Bonnie Rash, he was replaced by Intern John in 2012 (who got his stage name from the intern position he was holding at the time). During this time period, Melanie Glazener joined the show as a fourth co-host operating remotely out of Tampa, Florida. Sarah announced she was leaving the show in January 2013 to pursue a TV career in New York. She officially left the show later that Spring and was soon replaced by Danni Starr. After a period of absence, on January 20, 2014, Melanie announced on Instagram that she had left the show due to workplace differences. Soon after she was replaced by Rose. On February 11, 2016, Danni Starr left halfway during the show. After 3 1/2 weeks of being off air and many speculations on multiple media sites, Program Director Tommy Chuck confirmed that Danni had left the show.

The full lineup as it stands today is Intern John, Rose, and Riley (who joined in early 2017) as co-hosts.

The show was named "Best Local Morning show" in 2009, by industry magazine FMQB. The Kane Show was broadcast on seven additional radio stations, such as WNRW in Louisville, and WZFT in Baltimore. After 18 years, WFLZ's MJ Morning Show ended on February 17, 2012. It was announced that the Kane show would replace that show three days later.

The Kane Show debuted on iHeartRadio as a 24-hour on-demand channel in January 2010. Listeners were able to stream the Kane Show through both the iHeartRadio website and its respective smartphone applications.

On April 11, 2020, "The Kane Show" abruptly ended as Kane left the station after the previous day's show. On April 13, the show was rebranded as "Your Morning Show", featuring remaining members Intern John, Riley Couture, Rose and Erick. Kane died less than a year after the show was cancelled. "Your Morning Show" would eventually be cancelled on Friday, April 17, 2026, as all of its hosts were fired in a round of layoffs initiated by iHeartMedia.

== See also ==
- WKYS
- WPGC-FM
- WETA-FM
- WAMU
