= WGMS (Washington, D.C.) =

Classical music radio station in Washington, D.C. (1946–2007)

- Rockville, Maryland (1946–1992); Washington, D.C. (1948–2006); Braddock Heights/Waldorf, Maryland (2006–2007); United States
- Broadcast area: Washington metropolitan area
- Frequencies: 570 kHz (1946–1992); 103.5 MHz (1948–2006); 103.9 MHz/104.1 MHz (2006–2007)

Programming
- Format: Classical music

Ownership
- Owner: Bonneville International

History
- First air date: December 29, 1946
- Last air date: January 22, 2006
- Call sign meaning: "Washington's Good Music Station"

Technical information
- Licensing authority: FCC

Links
- Public license information: Public file; LMS

WGMS was a radio station in Washington, D.C. that maintained a classical music format from 1946 to 2007. Last owned by Bonneville International, it was known on air for many years as Classical 103.5. It last broadcast on 104.1 FM from a transmitter in Waldorf, Maryland, with a repeater signal broadcast from Braddock Heights, Maryland, on 103.9 FM under the call sign of WGYS.It was originally founded by M. Robert and Teresa Rogers.

The WGMS call letters are today in use by public radio station WETA-FM's repeater in Hagerstown, Maryland, having been donated by Bonneville as part of an agreement between both stations made public the same day WGMS signed off.

== History ==
=== Early history ===
The station went on air on December 29, 1946, under the call sign of WQQW at 570 kHz on the AM band. It added an FM signal, at 103.5 MHz, on September 18, 1948. It changed its call letters in 1951 to WGMS, which stood for "Washington's Good Music Station" (that slogan had been used on the station several years before). According to the station's website, WGMS "was the first FM signal in the marketplace and holds the record for the longest consecutive broadcast in the same format."

WGMS was at one time owned by RKO General Radio, which also owned top 40 stations in New York City (WXLO-FM), Boston (WRKO), Los Angeles (KHJ), Memphis (WHBQ), and Detroit (CKLW). In the 1970s, to comply with new FCC regulations limiting simulcasting, RKO prepared to change the format of WGMS (AM) to top 40. A public outcry in support of the classical format forestalled the change, and the United States Congress authorized the stations to simulcast their programming full-time, as an exemption from Federal Communications Commission regulations mandating separate programming on AM and FM outlets owned by a single entity.

In 1988, both WGMS AM & FM were sold off to Washington, D.C., venture capitalists Steven and Mitchell Rales and John VerStandig. The Rales Brothers later bought out VerStandig and converted WGMS AM into the first frequency for WTEM, a sports-talk station, on May 24, 1992. WTEM moved to 980 AM in 1998 as the result of a format swap between that station and business talk station WWRC, which itself now resides at 1260 AM. The 570 kHz frequency now belongs to Salem Communications, which uses it for news/talk station WWRC.

During WGMS's tenure at 103.5 FM, its antenna and engineering facility were located on The American University Tower.

=== 2006 frequency change ===
On January 4, 2006, Bonneville and the Washington Post announced that the frequencies then used by WTOP — 1500 kHz and 107.7 MHz — would be reassigned to a new station, WTWP, to be known on air as "Washington Post Radio." WTOP would move to 103.5 MHz, the frequency then used by classical music station WGMS; in turn, WGMS would move to 104.1 and 103.9 MHz, displacing contemporary music station WWZZ (Z104). At noon that day, WGMS and WTOP shifted frequencies, and Z104 shut down.

The change in frequency left WGMS with a weaker signal in the Washington area. At 103.5 MHz, it had broadcast at a strength of 44,000 watts; its new transmitter at 104.1 MHz broadcast at 20,000 watts from southern Prince George's County, well away from the center of the metropolitan area. Its repeater signal, at 103.9 MHz, had a strength of only 350 watts. (Coincidentally, the 103.9 signal in Braddock Heights, Maryland, had also once been a CHR station known as "Z104," under the WZYQ calls.)

=== Attempted sale ===
On December 8, 2006, The Washington Post reported a preliminary agreement by Washington Redskins owner Daniel Snyder to buy WGMS and convert it to a sports talk format, adding its frequency to the Triple X ESPN Radio network. Had the deal gone through, Washington, D.C., would have been left without a classical-music station as a result of the earlier 2005 switch of WETA to a public-radio news and talk format.

Washington-based XM Satellite Radio attempted to capitalize on the development, purchasing advertisements in The Washington Post billing itself as the new home of classical music in the region.

Snyder eventually withdrew from the purchase agreement, citing "a change in the radio climate" and hopes that "a better signal will soon become available in the market." News accounts suggested that a comment to the Post from an unnamed Bonneville executive, who said Snyder had offered "50 percent more than [WGMS] was worth," had stalled the negotiations.

=== 2007 format change ===
The Snyder offer led Bonneville executives to rethink their commitment to classical music on WGMS, with sports talk or popular music being the most likely formats considered as its replacement. Public outcry among the area’s classical music listeners over this possibility led the board of public radio station WETA (FM) to vote to approve a return to classical programming should Bonneville decide to end classical on WGMS. (WETA had carried classical music and NPR programming until February 2005, when it switched exclusively to a news-and-talk format.)

On January 22, 2007, at 3 p.m. EST, WGMS ceased operations. The final classical selection played on the station was the closing chorus, "With Tears of Grief," from Bach's St. Matthew Passion. Longtime program director Jim Allison made the announcement of the station's ceasing, but also announced at the same time that Bonneville had reached a deal with WETA that returned the latter station to a classical format. WETA assumed the classical format just five hours later, at 8 p.m. EST.

WETA hired Jim Allison as its new program director, and Bonneville donated its 15,000-disc WGMS music library to WETA. Bonneville also gave WETA the right to use the WGMS callsign; WETA adopted it for its repeater station in Hagerstown, Maryland, previously known as WETH. The two stations struck an unusual public/commercial cross-promotion agreement, under which WETA would promote Bonneville's news/talk stations WTOP-FM and WTWP, and Bonneville's stations would, in turn, promote classical programming on WETA.

The on-air talent of WGMS was terminated, while WETA released several talk show hosts and longtime Saturday-night folk music host Mary Cliff. The Washington Post reported that some of the displaced hosts from each station might be hired by either WETA or Bonneville. On January 30, WETA reported that WGMS afternoon announcer John Chester was hired for the 2 p.m. to 7 p.m. shift.

The programming changes meant that WETA converted to a format consisting of classical music 24 hours per day and seven days per week, dropping all long-form NPR and BBC programming such as Morning Edition, All Things Considered, and A Prairie Home Companion in the process. (Most of the canceled programming already aired on, or moved to, WAMU.) Hourly NPR newscasts remain during the daytime, as well as a simulcast of WETA-TV-produced The NewsHour with Jim Lehrer in the 7 p.m. hour, broadcast on radio for the benefit of commuters unable to arrive home in time to view the television airing.

Bonneville switched the 104.1 MHz frequency to an "adult hits" format under the callsign WXGG, known on air as George 104.1 (now WPRS-FM, a gospel format).

== Digital radio programing ==
In addition to its regular FM signal, WGMS used digital subchannels of 104.1 and 103.9 to carry "Viva La Voce," an all-vocal classical music station, as well as a high-definition version of WGMS. WGMS also broadcast "long-form" classical music on a digital subchannel of its former frequency, 103.5-FM.

According to the site of the Viva La Voce digital subchannel of WGMS, Viva La Voce has ceased operations. Viva La Voce is now carried full-time on WETA-FM HD-2.
