= KACY (TV) =

Television station in Festus, Missouri (1953–1954)

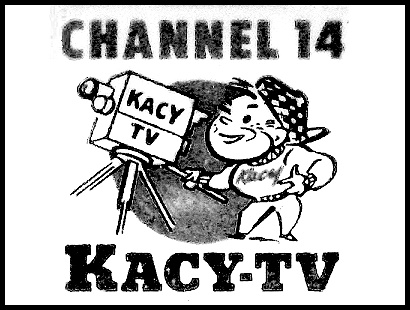
- Festus–St. Louis, Missouri; United States
- City: Festus, Missouri
- Channels: Analog: 14 (UHF)

Programming
- Affiliations: Independent

Ownership
- Owner: Ozark Television Corporation

History
- First air date: November 25, 1953
- Last air date: April 2, 1954

Technical information
- ERP: 324 kW
- Transmitter coordinates: 38°24′54.6″N 90°26′26.5″W

KACY (channel 14) was a television station licensed to Festus, Missouri, United States, which served the St. Louis area. One of the earliest UHF television stations in the country, KACY boasted of being the "most powerful new television station in the Middle West" but was a near-immediate market failure, broadcasting from November 25, 1953, to April 2, 1954. The station unsuccessfully contended that a conspiracy by another St. Louis–area station had impeded it from carrying network programming.

== History ==
On December 31, 1952, the Federal Communications Commission (FCC) granted a construction permit for a new UHF TV station on channel 14 to the Ozark Television Corporation, which had filed to build a station with studios near Kimmswick. After finding the original site proposal infeasible due to poor access, the station amended its construction permit before launch to specify a site on Rock Creek Road in rural Jefferson County, as well as a directional antenna pattern; it also specified the use of beam tilt, with a high maximum effective radiated power for the time of 324,000 watts and 491,000 watts with beam tilt. The result was a "boomerang" pattern that emphasized signal over Festus, as well as St. Louis. While licensed to Festus, the station's signal pattern and office location demonstrated the priority of St. Louis; Ozark constructed sales offices on Lindell Boulevard.

After test broadcasts commenced in late October, KACY began full program service November 25, 1953; it did not have a full network affiliation but intended to air some programs from CBS, as well as local news and feature shows, produced in a studio at the transmitter site. The station's cooking program was hosted by a man who made an abrupt career change: Laurent Torno, who quit the St. Louis Symphony Orchestra after 21 years, and at the age of 51, became the host of Man About the House.

Carriage of CBS programming, and its availability to KACY in the St. Louis market, quickly became a question of economic survival for the fledgling station. In the months preceding KACY's debut, two new UHF television stations had begun broadcasting, KSTM-TV (channel 36) in St. Louis and WTVI (channel 54) of Belleville, Illinois (which then moved to channel 36 at St. Louis when KSTM-TV folded and became today's KTVI). In March 1954, Ozark sued WTVI owner Signal Hill Television Corporation and CBS seeking more than $840,000 in damages and $2.5 million in antitrust treble damages. It charged that CBS and WTVI had conspired to prevent any CBS programming that was not being cleared by the only operating VHF outlet in the city at the time, KSD-TV, from being aired over KACY. This had severely affected the station's economic hopes. Having anticipated a $100,000 profit in the months after signing on, channel 14 had lost $244,282, according to the suit, and the value of its physical plant had dropped by $500,000.

The losses quickly became too great to bear. The station suspended operations on April 2, 1954, citing "a large operating loss" attributed to "the station's being denied the right to carry network programs". A week later, it filed for bankruptcy, desperate for new capital but hopeful that it could return to the air because of a substantial base of 200,000 converted UHF sets. However, station officials and the rest of the industry knew that UHF was inferior, particularly because there was no law requiring televisions to be able to tune UHF signals; Senator Charles E. Potter invited station president Jack Garrison to testify in front of a subcommittee hearing on troubles in television, where he promoted the idea of moving all television to UHF.

As a result of the bankruptcy hearing, KACY's assets were sold at auction in May 1955, where they fetched a combined $79,000 in high bids; one of the purchases was made by the United Broadcasting Company, holder of a channel 14 construction permit in Washington, D.C., who bought the transmitter for $20,000. The FCC deleted the channel 14 construction permit on September 13, 1955, for failing to keep the station active. The KACY lawsuit against WTVI and CBS, which was later expanded to include KSD-TV as a defendant, was dismissed in December 1956.
