= WKYS =

Urban contemporary radio station in Washington, D.C.

- Washington, D.C.; United States
- Broadcast area: Washington metropolitan area
- Frequency: 93.9 MHz (HD Radio)
- Branding: 93.9 WKYS

Programming
- Language: English
- Format: Urban contemporary
- Subchannels: HD2: WOL simulcast

Ownership
- Owner: Urban One; (Radio One Licenses, LLC)
- Sister stations: WLNO; WMMJ; WOL; WPRS; WYCB

History
- First air date: June 1947
- Former call signs: WRC-FM (1947–1974)
- Call sign meaning: "Kiss"

Technical information
- Licensing authority: FCC
- Facility ID: 73200
- Class: B
- ERP: 24,500 watts
- HAAT: 215 meters (705 ft)
- Transmitter coordinates: 38°56′24.4″N 77°04′52.9″W

Links
- Public license information: Public file; LMS
- Webcast: Listen live; Listen live (via Audacy); Listen live (via iHeartRadio)
- Website: kysdc.com

WKYS (93.9 FM) is a commercial radio station licensed to Washington, D.C., United States. The station is owned by Urban One through licensee Radio One Licenses, LLC, and broadcasts an urban contemporary format, with radio studios and offices in Silver Spring, Maryland.

WKYS's transmitter is sited on Nebraska Avenue NW, co-located with the tower for WRC-TV. WKYS also broadcasts in HD Radio.

== History ==
=== WRC-FM ===
The station first signed on the air as WRC-FM in June 1947. It was launched alongside its television partner, WRC-TV (originally WNBW). Both were built from the ground up by NBC, whose parent company–the Radio Corporation of America (RCA)–put WRC (980 AM) on the air 24 years earlier. The WRC call sign was derived from RCA. During its early days, WRC-FM simulcast most of WRC's programming with some jazz music also played.

In the late 1960s, FM stations in larger cities were no longer permitted to simulcast most of their programming. WRC-FM began an automated beautiful music format, largely soft instrumental songs played in quarter-hour sweeps. At the same time, WRC AM was airing a Top 40 format, playing current hits for young listeners. In 1974, 93.9 switched its call letters from WRC-FM to WKYS, standing for "Kiss-FM".

=== Top 40 and Disco ===
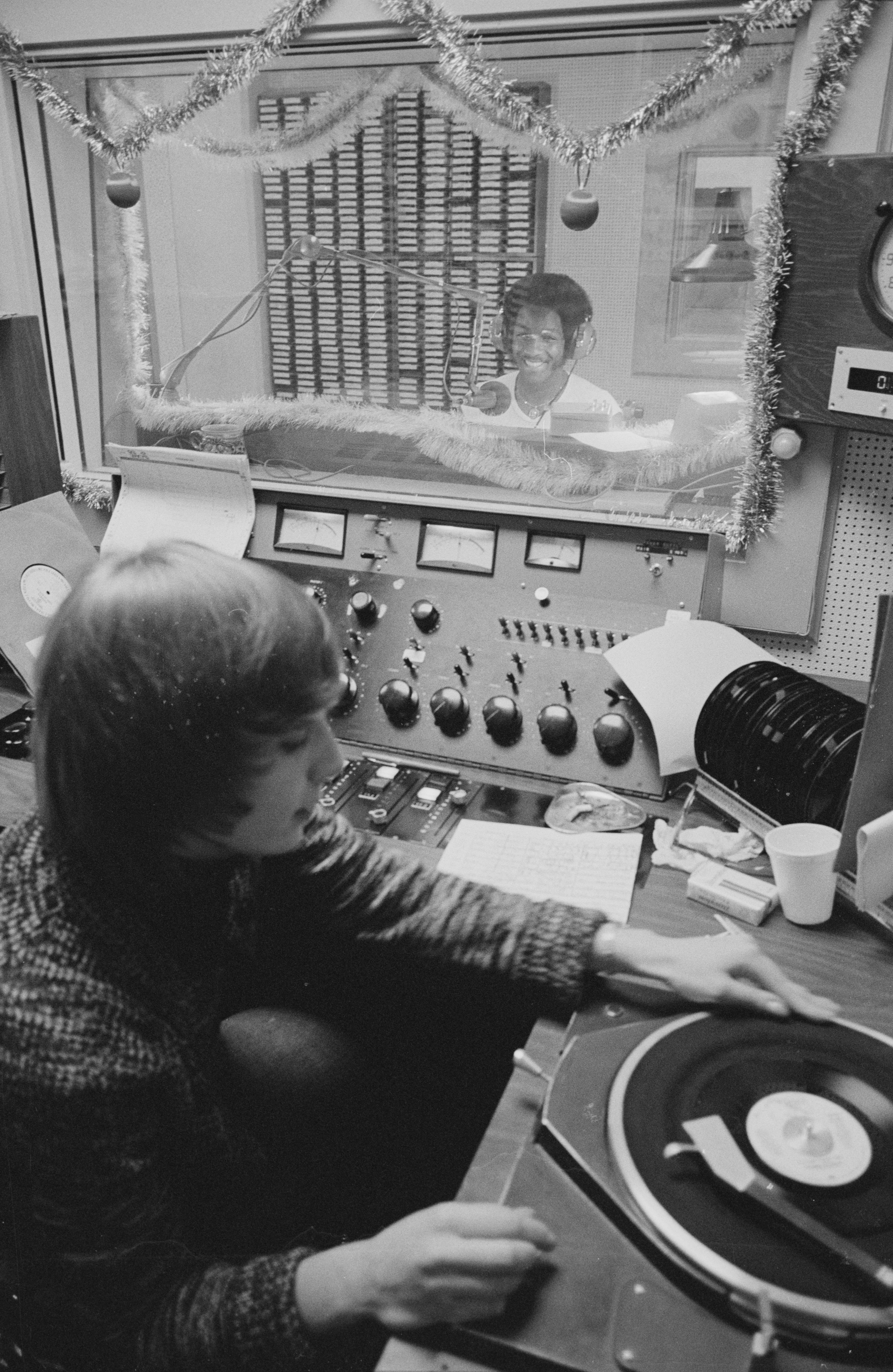
A disk jockey at WKYS in 1977

The transition to what is now WKYS occurred when NBC moved the Top 40 format that was on WRC to the FM station. That was to make way for an all-news radio format being launched on the AM station. For a short time in 1975, the two stations simulcast Top 40 music as listeners were redirected to 93.9 FM.

Shortly after the simulcast was discontinued, WKYS decided to modify its Top 40 sound. Instead of a blend of rock, pop and R&B hits, all popular on Top 40 stations, management noticed the coming boom in disco music. The FM station became "Disco 93.9" in 1975. DJs during the disco era included Donnie Simpson, Jack Harris, Stoney Richards, Joe Cipriano, Eddie Edwards, Barry "Reazar" Richards, Bill Bailey, Jeff Leonard, Chuck Davis, Candy Shannon and Max Kinkel.

=== Urban contemporary ===
The disco format eventually evolved into the present urban contemporary format as "93.9 Kiss FM". DJ Donnie Simpson became Kiss-FM's program director.

In the mid-1980s, WKYS gained competition from WMMJ and WPGC-FM. While that caused a setback in its dominance, WKYS did not suffer a huge of a threat to its ratings and audience share. It later began competing with WHUR-FM, which converted its jazz format to urban adult contemporary in 1993. (Washington D.C. is one of the few large radio markets to have multiple urban stations on the FM dial for a long time).

=== Changes in ownership ===
When NBC divested all of its radio properties in 1988, WKYS was sold to Albimar Communications. In the 1990s, Albimar ran into financial difficulties. In 1995, the station was sold to Radio One (the original name for current owner Urban One).

In the mid-1990s, WKYS was forced to drop the "Kiss FM" name and changed it to "93.9 WKYS" due to Clear Channel Communications acquiring the rights to the KISS-FM branding. Clear Channel chose to enforce its trademark rights nationwide. However, WKYS reintroduced the "Kiss FM" name for a period of time, without any further claims of legal action from Clear Channel, before returning to "93.9 WKYS".

=== Past shows ===
From 1977 to 1993, WKYS was home to radio and TV personality Donnie Simpson. The station was also once the flagship station of the nationally syndicated Russ Parr Morning Show. In January 2016, Parr moved to sister station WMMJ to take over after Tom Joyner left. Parr was replaced on WKYS by "The Fam in the Morning". The current wake-up show is "The Morning Hustle".

From 1983 to 1990, Kevin "Slow Jammin" James hosted his "Slow Jam" radio show from 7 pm to midnight, on Saturdays and Sundays.

== See also ==
- WHUR-FM
- WIHT
- WPGC-FM
