= WOOK-TV =

Television station in Washington, D.C. (1963–1972)

WFAN-TV
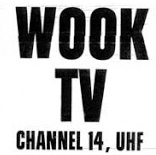
- Washington, D.C.; United States
- Channels: Analog: 14 (UHF)

Programming
- Affiliations: Independent

Ownership
- Owner: United Broadcasting Company; (United TV Company)
- Sister stations: WOOK; WFAN

History
- First air date: March 5, 1963
- Last air date: February 12, 1972
- Former call signs: WOOK-TV (1963–1968)
- Call sign meaning: Adopted from WFAN radio

Technical information
- ERP: 245 kW
- HAAT: 330 ft (101 m)
- Transmitter coordinates: 38°57′17″N 77°0′17″W

WOOK-TV was a television station that broadcast on channel 14 to Washington, D.C., United States. Operating from 1963 to 1972 (using the WFAN-TV call sign from 1968 to 1972), it was the first television station in the United States to orient its entire programming to an African-American audience, along the lines of co-owned WOOK radio. Mounting license troubles for the United Broadcasting station group, economic difficulties faced by independent and UHF stations, and an inability to upgrade channel 14's facilities to be competitive in the market led to the closure of WFAN-TV on February 12, 1972.

== History ==
=== The road to air ===
In 1953, Richard Eaton's United Broadcasting Company, owners of WOOK (1340 AM), WFAN (100.3 FM) and Rockville–based WINX, among other outlets in the mid-Atlantic states, filed for television channels 18 in Baltimore and 50 in Washington. With no applications pending for channel 14 at Annapolis, Maryland, Eaton petitioned the Federal Communications Commission (FCC) to move the channel 14 allotment to Washington, which it did in 1955; Eaton also acquired channel 14 equipment at auction from the bankrupt KACY of Festus, Missouri.

In February, Eaton announced that WOOK-TV would debut with programming in the evenings only and would not feature a network affiliation or a schedule of films; in addition, Eaton, planned to build out the Baltimore construction permit as a semi-satellite of WOOK-TV. The station signed jazz musician Lionel Hampton as its musical director. WOOK-TV would launch from WOOK radio's studio facility in the Chillum Castle Manor subdivision, on 1st Place, NE.

Initially planned to debut in September 1962, WOOK-TV's start was delayed due to technical challenges. It missed another launch date, in February, in part due to equipment issues and also because it had a problem to sort out in the Black community. Leaders in the Urban League and the NAACP worried that the station would not represent the community well, that WOOK-TV would depict African Americans "in the tap-dancing, shouting type of program", much as in radio; Eaton pledged not to program "distasteful" shows on the new station. The station finally debuted on March 6, 1963. It was the District's second UHF television station, after public WETA-TV (channel 26), which had gone on the air in 1961. Some 90,000 to 100,000 UHF converters were in place when channel 14 signed on.

=== Initial programming ===
At the outset, channel 14's programming included a number of Black-hosted series. The station aired two daily newscasts, as well as the interview show Washington Speaks and several syndicated shows aimed at an African American audience. However, going against Eaton's promise of a year earlier, WOOK-TV filled its remaining hours with films, primarily pre-1945 fare. It also produced some general-audience entertainment programs, including a high school quiz show, children's program Aunt Mary's Birthday Party, and a talent show. Musical director Hampton produced at WOOK a music show that was syndicated to other stations. The Precola DeVore Show, covering fashion and beauty topics, was hosted by Precola DeVore, who became one of the first black women business owners in Washington when she founded a charm school in 1953; she was nationally recognized for helping to break the color barrier in modeling.

Channel 14's connection with WOOK radio also had its advantages. Six days a week, WOOK disc jockey Bob King hosted Teenarama Dance Party, an in-studio dance show with a black teenage audience. Over a seven-year run on the air (though King left in a dispute with management in 1968), Teenarama hosted rising stars and famous musicians including Chubby Checker, Dee Dee Sharp and Brook Benton, as well as musical talent in town to play the Howard Theatre. Teenarama Dance Party would later be considered the most important program in WOOK-TV/WFAN-TV's broadcast history.

WOOK-TV also produced for local and national advertisers commercials for its target market. The station's production department counted among its clients Budweiser, Safeway, Sinclair Oil, Newport cigarettes and Speed Queen washers and dryers.

On March 1, 1967, the Baltimore station, with the call letters WMET-TV and having been moved to channel 24 in a 1961 allocation revision, began telecasting, with plans to carry 80 percent of WOOK-TV's programming. An attempted 1971 sale of WMET-TV to the Christian Broadcasting Network never closed, and channel 24 folded on January 14, 1972.

=== A time of change ===
In 1967, WOOK's programming began to shift to include more local news and public affairs content. This change would allow the station to spend less on films, where it had found itself uncompetitive with the VHF stations in purchasing the rights to attractive motion pictures. That year, it added two and a half hours a day of local and United Press International news hosted by Tex Gathings and a new talk show, Controversy, hosted by Dennis Richards. Controversy went through several host changes in its early months on air, while the new news show met with poor reception because of the small size of the WOOK-TV news department. Also in 1967, WMET-TV (moved to channel 24 in an allocation revision six years earlier), the Baltimore station, finally began broadcasting. Early the next year, Channel 14 also added weekly hours in Italian and Spanish, and on February 14, it changed call letters from WOOK-TV to WFAN-TV, matching Eaton's other Washington station, Spanish-language FM outlet WFAN 100.3.

More than the programming and call letters was changing at the newly renamed WFAN-TV in 1968. John Panagos, the station's general manager and vice president of United, was replaced with E. Carlton "Bud" Myers; Bob King left, leaving Teenarama Dance Party to rotate hosts until it ended in 1970; and an attempt to unionize led to a walkout at the end of August.

=== License challenge ===
In 1965, even as the FCC gave short-term renewals to a number of Eaton-owned outlets, WOOK-TV was one of three that received a full-term renewal of its license. In 1966, United's AM and TV stations in Washington came in for competition when two groups vied to take them over: Washington Community Broadcasting Company, led by journalist Drew Pearson and which also sought to take over the radio station, and Washington Civic Television, whose principals included WRC-TV sportscaster Jim Simpson and Lewis Shollenberger, former head of Radio Liberty in Munich.

At the next renewal cycle, in 1969, the FCC designated Washington Community's challenges alongside WOOK's and WFAN-TV's license renewals for hearing. Washington Community had become the only challenger for channel 14 when Washington Civic Television dropped out and merged with it, bringing Truman-era Assistant Attorney General Thurman Arnold into its fold. It then dropped out of the television fight in 1970 after the death of Pearson the year before. (Washington Community would eventually win the 1340 frequency held by WOOK radio, with the result being the launch of WYCB in August 1978.) United also attempted to upgrade WFAN-TV's signal, boosting its effective radiated power to 1,265 kW from a transmitter site in Bethesda, Maryland; however, the FCC denied the move because of overlap with WMET-TV's signal.

=== Closure and license deletion ===
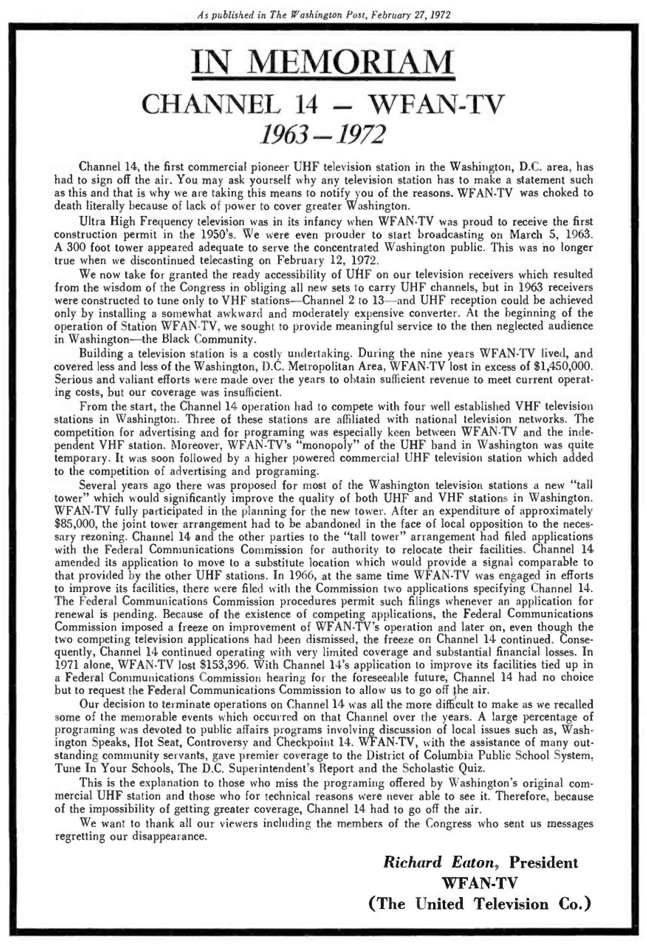
1972 station closing advertisement.

On February 12, 1972, United took WFAN-TV dark, citing the company's financial condition. The February 27 edition of the Washington Post, as well as the next day's issue of Broadcasting magazine, carried a full-page "In Memoriam" ad for WFAN-TV. The ad, taken out by Eaton, diagnosed channel 14 as being "choked to death literally because of lack of power to cover greater Washington", because of the failure of a common tower site for D.C. television stations in 1966 and the hearing-related freeze on later facility improvements, and revealed that in nearly nine years of operation, the television station had lost $1.45 million—$153,000 of that in 1971 alone. Eaton also noted competition from Washington's other independent stations—longstanding VHF independent WTTG-TV and UHF newcomer WDCA—for programming and advertisers. Thirteen employees lost their jobs, while five continued to provide engineering services to the radio stations.

That November, amid calls to delete channel 14 from television use in Washington and convert it to land mobile use, United found a buyer for WFAN-TV: two Milwaukee businessmen, Robert S. Block and Marvin Fishman, who proposed operation of channel 14 on a subscription television basis and would pay $250,000 for the channel if the FCC approved their plan.

In 1973, while the hearing examiner's initial decision found against WOOK and preferred its competing application to the renewal of that station, it found United qualified to be a licensee and recommended renewal of channel 14's (unchallenged) license. United asked the FCC to keep the WFAN-TV license active while it tried to sell it, but the FCC said that because of the multiple and interrelated proceedings against Eaton that were likely to take years, that would simply take too long. The commission ordered United to put WFAN-TV and WMET-TV back on the air by July 1. The deadline was pushed back to December 1; United notified the FCC that it intended to appeal the order. On April 26, 1974, the FCC ruled that both licenses should be revoked so that new applications could be accepted for Washington's channel 14 and Baltimore's channel 24.

== Channel 14 after WOOK-TV ==
Channel 14 remained unused by a full-power station in Washington for more than 20 years after the closure of WOOK-TV. In 1976, it was reactivated in the form of translator W14AA, relaying the Central Virginia Educational Television Corporation's WNVT from Annandale, Virginia; WNVT was licensed to rural Goldvein, Virginia, too far to the south to adequately cover the Washington suburbs. CVETC attempted to have the full-powered channel 14 allocation moved to Fairfax, noting that the current transmitter at Arlington often came in the back of Northern Virginia antennas aimed toward Washington, but this request was denied. What was to become WNVC was constructed on channel 56 instead, and on its sign-on in June 1981, W14AA was no longer necessary.

Later in the year, CVETC sold W14AA to Los Cerezos Television Company. Los Cerezos (Spanish for "Cherry Trees") had established in 1980 a satellite-fed translator station on channel 56 of the Spanish International Network, the second such "satellator", initially authorized on an experimental basis. After the FCC gave its approval to feed translators by satellite, W14AA returned to air as the Washington affiliate of SIN (now known as Univision). In order to accommodate the new full-power channel 14, this station moved to channel 48 in 1989 and is today WMDO-CD.

As the FCC began taking applications for a new licensee for channel 14, now licensed to Arlington, Virginia, D.C. mayor Walter E. Washington expressed his desire that the new channel 14 be minority-owned. Overruling his initial decision, in 1984, administrative law judge Edward Kuhlmann selected the bid of Urban Telecommunications Corporation, finding that since Urban was financially qualified, its management and operations were more integrated than those of previous winner WSCT-TV. After years of extensions, the station went on the air in 1993 as WTMW, named for Urban's sole owner, Theodore M. White.
