= WOL (AM) =

Urban talk radio station in Washington, D.C.

- Washington, D.C.; United States
- Broadcast area: Washington, D.C.
- Frequency: 1450 kHz
- Branding: Newstalk 1450 WOL

Programming
- Language: English
- Format: Urban talk
- Affiliations: Premiere Networks

Ownership
- Owner: Urban One; (Radio One Licenses, LLC)
- Sister stations: WKYS; WLNO; WMMJ; WPRS; WYCB

History
- First air date: May 3, 1941
- Former call signs: WWDC (1941–1950)

Technical information
- Licensing authority: FCC
- Facility ID: 54713
- Class: C
- Power: 370 watts
- Transmitter coordinates: 38°57′19.4″N 77°0′13.9″W
- Repeater: 93.9 WKYS-HD2 (Washington)

Links
- Public license information: Public file; LMS
- Webcast: Listen live
- Website: woldcnews.com

WOL (1450 kHz) is an urban talk AM radio station in Washington, D.C. This is the flagship radio station of Radio One. It is co-owned with WKYS, WLNO, WMMJ, WPRS, and WYCB and has studios located in Silver Spring, Maryland. The transmitter site, shared with WYCB, is in Fort Totten in Washington, D.C.

A Baltimore version of this station, WOLB, was created in the early 1990s and shares some of the same programming as WOL.

== History ==
=== WWDC ===
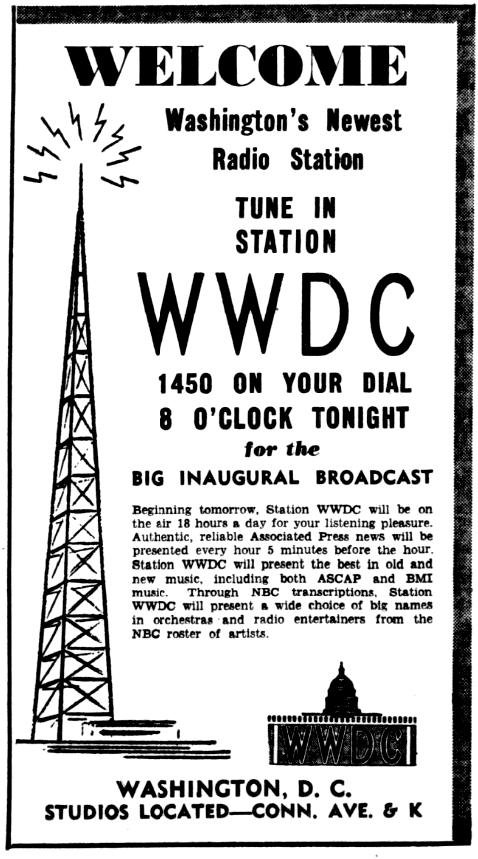
From its May 3, 1941 debut until 1950, the station call sign was WWDC.

The station was granted a construction permit, as WWDC, by the Federal Communications Commission (FCC) on October 29, 1940, for a new station to broadcast with 250 watts on 1420 kHz. In March 1941, most stations assigned to this frequency, including WWDC, were reassigned to 1450 kHz, under the provisions of the North American Regional Broadcasting Agreement.

WWDC made its debut broadcast at 8 p.m. on May 3, 1941, airing programming from 8 a.m. to 1 a.m. Studios were at 1000 Connecticut Avenue. An independent station with no network affiliation, the station advertised it would broadcast Associated Press newscasts five minutes before every hour, and "through NBC transcriptions, Station WWDC will present a wide choice of big names in orchestras and radio entertainers from the NBC roster of stars".

=== WOL ===
On January 26, 1950, the FCC approved the sale of WWDC by Capital Broadcasting, which had just bought WOL (1260 AM) from Cowles Broadcasting, to Peoples Broadcasting Corporation, an affiliate of the local People's Drug Stores, and announced the two stations would be swapping call letters. The change took place February 20, 1950. This swap moved the WOL call letters to 1450 AM.

In 1965, the Sonderling Broadcasting Corporation bought WOL and changed the format from easy listening to rhythm and blues. That year, WOL also became the first rhythm and blues station in Washington to have public affairs programming. "No other medium in the city had WOL's influence and credibility among black Washingtonians from 1965 to about 1975...With finger-popping, hand-clapping and foot-stomping, they were the broadcasters of gospel-influenced, inner city culture," The Washington Post observed. WOL helped popularize "Chocolate City" as a nickname for Washington, according to the Post.

Originally simulcast on its FM sister station WMOD for more extensive coverage, they later changed the FM station to an oldies format. The station slowly deemphasized its music programming and evolved into an African-American based talk station.

Sonderling Broadcasting later sold its assets to Viacom Broadcasting. After Viacom took over, WMOD became country station WMZQ-FM.

Competition from FM stations that had stronger signals and stereo sound reduced WOL's ratings in the late 1970s. By 1976, the Federal Communications Commission concluded an investigation of allegations of payola against WOL and other black stations around the U.S. In late 1979, the Almic Corporation, headed by Dewey and Cathy Hughes, purchased the station. Dewey Hughes told The Washington Post: "The day of the rapping jock is over. Radio is generally toning down because of a new concern about contemporary adult music."

During the 1960s and 1970s, WOL was home to Petey Greene, a former convict turned popular talk show host, comedian, and activist, who began his professional broadcasting career at WOL. His story was portrayed in the 2007 film Talk To Me.

== Notable hosts ==
- Joe Madison
- Ambrose I. Lane Sr.
- Rob Redding

== See also ==
- List of three-letter broadcast call signs in the United States
