= Ambrose I. Lane Sr. =

American activist

- Born: Knoxville, Tennessee, U.S.
- Died: Washington, D.C.
- Education: University of Pittsburgh

Reverend Ambrose I. Lane Sr. (February 12, 1935 – September 14, 2010) was an American anti-poverty activist, radio talk show personality and political and religious commentator.

== Early life and education ==
The Knoxville, Tennessee native had a masters in social work from the University of Pittsburgh in 1963.

== Program ==
His program, "We Ourselves", aired from 1978 until his death on the Pacifica Foundation's WPFW-FM, a 50,000 watt station in the nation's capitol. He also hosted a similar show on XM 169 The Power, now the SiriusXM 126, from March 2006 until July 26, 2007.

He used his knowledge of law and people to co-anchored gavel-to-gavel coverage of U.S. Supreme Court confirmation hearings and Pacifica's daily national six weeks live coverage of the Persian Gulf War.

He managed the Pacific Foundation from 2005 to 2006, as well as other human services agencies. In 2005, Lane signed (for Pacific Foundation) a 15-year lease with Empire State Realty for tower transmission for WBAI.

== Writings ==
His 1982 essay, "Where Are Your Responsible White Leaders?", made a splash when it was published in The Washington Post. "Frankly, blacks are tired of carrying the overwhelmingly disproportionate share of the responsibility for preserving freedom and extending democracy in America," he wrote. "And we are sick and tired of being your favorite scapegoats whenever your irresponsible, greedy leaders rip you off."

The publisher of numerous books and pamphlets, he was a founder, part owner, editor and publisher and board chair of the Buffalo New York Challenger, serving Buffalo, Rochester, and Syracuse, New York.

He also created the National Center's Department of Research and Development's publications The National Center Reporter and New Spirit. Lane's most recent book was "For Whites Only? How and Why America Became A Racist Nation" was published in 1999.

He was a recipient of the United Black Fund's Media Excellence Award "for 20 Years of Outstanding Service to the Community Through Superb Journalism."
