= WLNO (FM) =

Radio station in Waldorf, Maryland

Coordinates: 38°37′7.8″N 76°50′37.9″W

- Waldorf, Maryland; United States
- Broadcast area: Washington metropolitan area
- Frequency: 104.1 MHz (HD Radio)
- Branding: Latino 104.1/87.7

Programming
- Language: Spanish
- Format: Contemporary hit radio

Ownership
- Owner: Urban One; (Radio One Licenses, LLC)
- Sister stations: WKYS; WMMJ; WOL; WPRS; WYCB

History
- First air date: June 23, 1961
- Former call signs: WSMD (1961–1965); WSMD-FM (1965–1976); WXTR-FM (1976–1996); WWZZ (1996–2006); WGMS (2006–2007); WXGG (2007); WPRS-FM (2007–2025); WDCJ (2025)
- Call sign meaning: "Latino"

Technical information
- Licensing authority: FCC
- Facility ID: 74212
- Class: B
- ERP: 20,000 watts
- HAAT: 244 meters (801 ft)
- Repeaters: WDCN-LD (87.7 FM, Fairfax)

Links
- Public license information: Public file; LMS
- Webcast: Listen live
- Website: latinoalaire.com

WLNO (104.1 MHz), branded "Latino 104.1/87.7", is a Spanish-language contemporary hit radio formatted radio station in the Washington metropolitan area. The station is licensed to Waldorf, Maryland, and is co-owned with WKYS, WMMJ, WOL, WPRS and WYCB and has studios located in Silver Spring, Maryland, with a transmitter located just east of Waldorf.

WLNO simulcasts on WDCN-LD (87.7 FM), licensed to Fairfax, Virginia, in order to cover the western part of the Washington market.

== History ==
=== Early years ===
The station went on the air June 23, 1961, as WSMD, owned by Dorlen Broadcasters. In October 1965, the FM station was joined by WSMD (1560 AM) in La Plata, with WSMD-FM simulcasting the AM station.

=== Xtra 104 ===
For many years, 104.1 FM was known as WXTR-FM, an oldies station known as "Xtra 104", which began in 1976. WXTR, which had been purchased by Liberty Broadcasting, was soon paired with the Frederick, Maryland-licensed WZYQ (103.9 FM) (which aired a Top 40 format), in an attempt to attain better signal coverage for WXTR-FM. From that point on, both stations operated as a simulcast throughout a variety of formats: first oldies, then all-1970s music.

=== Z104 ===
Finally, Bonneville purchased the WXTR-FM/WZYQ combo, and, under program director Dale O'Brian, changed the format over to contemporary hit radio at 11 a.m. on July 15, 1996, as "Z104" with the call letters WWZZ and WWVZ. "Z104" was Washington, D.C.'s first Top 40 station since the flip of WAVA to Christian programming in 1992. The station was also known for its community efforts and donation drives for local charities.

On October 1, 2001, due to new competition from WIHT (which had a full-market signal), Z104 switched to a modern adult contemporary format, playing music by the likes of Dave Matthews Band, Goo Goo Dolls and Third Eye Blind. The format proved an effective alternative to WIHT and to local stations WWDC (DC101) and WHFS (HFS 99.1), both of which specialized in hard rock. The simulcast also dropped the "Z104" name in favor of "More Music 104" and simply "104" for a while, before reverting to the "Z104" name on April 8, 2004, at 8:04 a.m. Furthermore, as a member of the Nationals Radio Network, it offered radio coverage of a large portion of the Washington Nationals games during the team's inaugural season in 2005.

On January 4, 2006, at noon, WWZZ went off the air due to a multiple-station format change arranged by Bonneville International. One of the most popular stations in the Washington, D.C., area, all-news station WTOP, expanded its reach by adding 103.5 to its collection, though a new radio station, "Washington Post Radio", took over WTOP's previous frequencies on March 30, 2006. The previous occupant of 103.5, the classical music station WGMS, was moved to the Z104 frequencies. The final full song played on "Z104" was "Soul To Squeeze" by Red Hot Chili Peppers. The opening lyrics of "I Will Remember You" by Sarah McLachlan were then played, but the song was cut off by general manager Joel Oxley announcing the changes, thanking the staff and listeners, and, in a rare move, redirecting former listeners to competing stations in the area.

=== George 104 ===
On January 22, 2007, at 3 p.m., after the announcement of the end of WGMS (which had aired on various frequencies in the Washington market for 60 years), 104.1/103.9 flipped to adult hits, branded as "George 104". At the time of the format change, Bonneville announced that it had reached a deal with public radio station WETA-FM to return the latter station to a classical format. WETA hired Jim Allison, the longtime program director of WGMS, and Bonneville donated its 15,000-disc WGMS music library to WETA. Bonneville also gave WETA the right to use the WGMS call sign. The format change to "George" took place after an abortive effort by Bonneville in late 2006, to sell the two frequencies to Washington Redskins owner Daniel Snyder. Snyder planned to buy WGMS to convert it to a sports radio format, adding its frequencies to the Triple X ESPN Radio network. Snyder withdrew from the preliminary purchase agreement, however, citing "a change in the radio climate" and hopes that "a better signal will soon become available in the market". News accounts suggested that a comment to The Washington Post from an unnamed Bonneville executive, who said Snyder had offered "50 percent more than WGMS was worth", had stalled the negotiations.

The station used the "George" moniker (as in George Washington) for its adult hits instead of the usual "Jack FM", which is trademarked. The call sign for 104.1 FM would be changed to WXGG on February 1.

"George 104", however, only lasted about three months. Bonneville announced a local marketing agreement with Radio One for the 104.1 signal on April 6, 2007. WGYS (the call sign for 103.9 FM, carried over from the WGMS simulcast) was switched on the same date to a simulcast of WTOP (as WTLP), while the 104.1 frequency went dark in anticipation of a format switch ("George", meanwhile, moved to WTOP-HD2, though it would eventually be discontinued altogether).

=== Praise 104.1 ===
Previous logo

"Praise 104.1" launched the next morning (Easter Sunday). On April 24, WXGG changed its call letters to WPRS-FM. Radio One would acquire the station outright in July 2007, with the sale closing a year later. In 2019, WPRS's HD2 subchannel began broadcasting programming from sister station WTEM.

=== Latino 104.1 ===
On October 16, 2025, the gospel format moved to the former WDCJ (92.7 FM) along with a callsign swap between the two stations. The 104.1 FM facility began running a Spanish contemporary hit radio format branded as "Latino 104.1".
