= WMET-TV =

Television station in Baltimore (1967–1972)

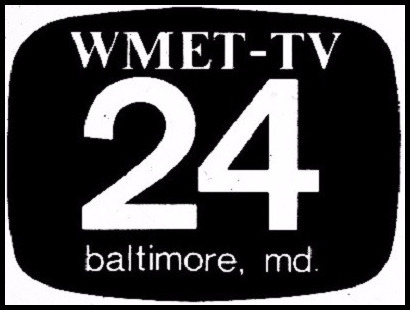
- Baltimore, Maryland; United States
- Channels: Analog: 24 (UHF)

Programming
- Affiliations: Independent

Ownership
- Owner: United Broadcasting Company; (United Broadcasting Company of Eastern Maryland, Inc.)
- Sister stations: WSID-AM-FM; WOOK-TV/WFAN-TV Washington, D.C.

History
- First air date: March 1, 1967
- Last air date: January 14, 1972

Technical information
- ERP: 20.4 kW
- HAAT: 570 ft (174 m)
- Transmitter coordinates: 39°20′20″N 76°40′2″W

WMET-TV was a television station operating on channel 24 in Baltimore, Maryland, from 1967 to 1972. It was owned by the United Broadcasting Company and served as a semi-satellite of its WOOK-TV/WFAN-TV in Washington, D.C., with some locally originated programs. Due to a series of financial and license difficulties at United, WMET-TV closed in January 1972, a month before WFAN-TV.

== History ==
=== Construction permit ===
Even though the station did not come on the air until March 1967, WMET-TV's construction permit was issued more than 13 years prior in December 1953, as WTLF on channel 18. The channel specified on the permit was changed from 18 to 24 in 1961, as part of a four-way shuffle that primarily served to cluster the operating TV channels in the Harrisburg, Pennsylvania, area, by changing channels 55 and 71 there to 21 and 33.

Activity was minimal for most of the first decade. In 1962, United turned its efforts to constructing WOOK-TV, channel 14 in Washington, D.C., and noted that it hoped to put WTLF on the air within six to twelve months of signing on WOOK-TV. However, channel 24 still was not on the air by 1965, when the Federal Communications Commission (FCC) put pressure on the owners of dark UHF construction permits—including WTLF—to explain why they should not be withdrawn; also at that time, the FCC denied an application by United to allow WTLF to begin operations on channel 18 before moving to 24. In August 1965, the FCC approved changes to the construction permit reflecting the facilities it would build; the next month, WTLF changed its call letters to WMET-TV.

By November 1966, the station neared completion, though it missed its stated launch date. General manager J. Herman Sitrick noted that channel 24 would carry 80 percent of WOOK-TV's African American-oriented programming. Channel 24 was also announced to be the Baltimore outlet for the Overmyer Network when it debuted.

=== On the air ===
WMET-TV, Baltimore's fourth TV station and its first in nearly two decades, finally signed on March 1, 1967. Much as WOOK-TV had pivoted to at the same time, channel 24 aired a lineup of mostly news and panel shows at launch, along with a syndicated Western series and Teenarama Dance Party, its Washington sister station's signature show. It also sought to air network programs not being cleared by the other three stations in town, including the ABC soap opera General Hospital, which WJZ-TV dropped from 1970 to 1972, along with The Newlywed Game and The Dating Game, to make room for the Geoup W–produced The Mike Douglas Show. However, the preempted ABC shows were not broadcast in color. The station's first live program from its Baltimore studios was a three-hour special on April 17, presenting films on both sides of the Vietnam War argument. Channel 24 also aired The Las Vegas Show, the only program of the renamed United Network (no relation to United Broadcasting Company), at midnight when it debuted on May 1; that day, Trails West and the United Network offering were the only programs not shared with WOOK-TV. The station soon added more movies and syndicated programming. It also aired a weekly variety show, Coffee House U.S.A., with regional performers. Pauline Wells Lewis, then a disc jockey at WSID and in the middle of a 50-year career in gospel music and local radio, hosted a Saturday night half-hour.

In March 1968, the station appointed a sports director, Frank Holston, and channel 24 began airing a sports call-in show called Sports View. A year later, the station started airing a locally produced children's show, Pogo the Clown, in early evenings. In 1971, the station's news director was 19-year-old John Domenick, a college sophomore who delivered a half-hour newscast at 4:30 p.m. each weekday compiled from wire service material.

Channel 24's studios were a converted movie theater, the former Avalon Theater on Park Heights Avenue, which also housed the United Baltimore radio stations; the radio studios occupied the former manager's office and production room, and the auditorium was converted into a studio.

=== Closure ===
In 1969, WOOK radio and television received challenges to their licenses, starting years of legal troubles for United Broadcasting. In 1971, United found a proposed buyer for its Baltimore station: the Christian Broadcasting Network (CBN), which agreed to pay $750,000 to buy channel 24. At the time, CBN owned just one television station, WYAH-TV in the Norfolk, Virginia, market. However, any action on the sale was contingent on the outcome of the various hearings into UBC operations. Later in the year, United announced it would exit television completely; by this time, CBN had cut its purchase price to $125,000, a sum negotiated after CBN threatened to pull out of the agreement altogether. As United continued to lose money—$7,000 a month—running channel 24, and with many of its stations in legal limbo, the company took WMET-TV dark on January 14, 1972, and sought permission to remain silent from the FCC until the transfer to CBN was finalized. The FCC Broadcast Bureau granted it 60 days of silence, worried that, if channel 24 were to wait for the CBN sale to return to air, it might be off air for months or years.

On February 12, United then took WFAN-TV in Washington dark, citing the company's financial condition. The February 27 edition of the Washington Post, as well as the next day's issue of Broadcasting magazine, carried a full-page "In Memoriam" ad for WFAN-TV; the ad, taken out by United's founder, Richard Eaton, revealed that the D.C. station was a money-losing venture.

In 1973, while the hearing examiner's initial decision found against WOOK radio and preferred its competing application to the renewal of that station, it found United qualified to be a licensee and recommended renewal of WFAN-TV's (unchallenged) license. United asked the FCC to keep the WFAN-TV and WMET-TV licenses active pending a sale, but the FCC said that because of the multiple and interrelated proceedings against Eaton that were likely to take years, and since the sales were conditioned on hearing actions, that would simply take too long. The commission ordered United to put WFAN-TV and WMET-TV back on the air by July 1, 1973. The deadline was pushed back to December 1; United notified the FCC that it intended to appeal the order. On April 26, 1974, the FCC ruled that both licenses should be revoked so that new applications could be accepted for Washington's channel 14 and Baltimore's channel 24.

== Channel 24 after WMET-TV ==
In February 1977, Jesus Lives, Inc., whose president hosted a syndicated talk show of the same name, applied to build a new station on channel 24. Jesus Lives ended the comparative hearing in December 1980 by buying out competing applicant Buford Television of Maryland. After years of trying to obtain funding to obtain the facility and the sale of the construction permit, channel 24 returned to Baltimore nearly 14 years after it had left, as WKJL-TV on December 24, 1985.
