= WBIG-FM =

Classic rock radio station in Washington, D.C.

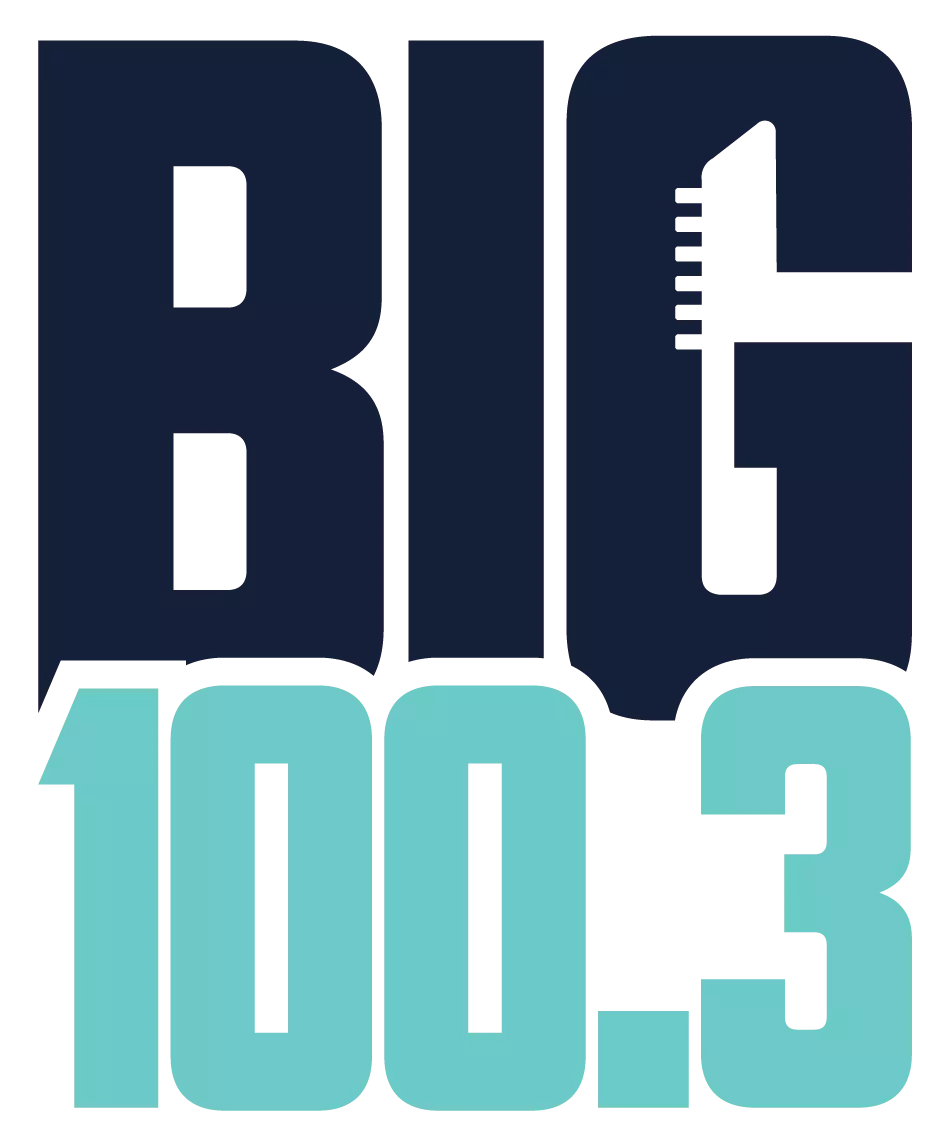
- Washington, D.C.; United States
- Broadcast area: Washington metropolitan area
- Frequency: 100.3 MHz (HD Radio)
- Branding: Big 100

Programming
- Format: Classic rock
- Subchannels: HD2: Now and Then (all-Beatles)
- Affiliations: iHeartRadio; Washington Commanders

Ownership
- Owner: iHeartMedia, Inc.; (iHM Licenses, LLC)
- Sister stations: WASH; WIHT; WMZQ-FM; WUST; WWDC

History
- First air date: 1951
- Former call signs: WOOK-FM (1951); WFAN (1951–76); WOOK (1976–84); WDJY (1984–91); WJZE (1991–93)
- Former frequencies: 95.9 MHz (1951–52)
- Call sign meaning: "Big"

Technical information
- Licensing authority: FCC
- Facility ID: 54459
- Class: B
- ERP: 50,000 watts (analog); 500 watts (digital)
- HAAT: 149 meters (489 ft)
- Transmitter coordinates: 38°53′13.4″N 77°12′1.9″W

Links
- Public license information: Public file; LMS
- Webcast: Listen live (via iHeartRadio)
- Website: wbig.iheart.com

WBIG-FM (100.3 MHz), branded as Big 100, is a commercial radio station licensed to Washington, D.C. It has a classic rock radio format and is owned by iHeartMedia, Inc. The studios and offices are in Rockville, Maryland.

WBIG-FM has an effective radiated power of 50,000 watts. Its transmitter is off Tower Street in Falls Church, Virginia, unusually within a dense residential neighborhood with single-family housing surrounding it on all sides. Besides a standard analog transmission, WBIG broadcasts using HD Radio technology, and is also available online via iHeartRadio. The station is the official radio partner of the NFL's Washington Commanders.

== History ==
=== WOOK-FM, WFAN ===
The station first broadcast on 95.9, and was first licensed in 1951. It was owned by the United Broadcasting Company and had the call sign WOOK-FM, as the companion to WOOK (1340 AM). The two stations largely simulcast their programming.

The FM station soon changed call signs to WFAN, apparently to emphasize its status as the flagship of the Washington Senators radio network. The station moved to 100.3 MHz and upgraded power in 1952. WFAN broadcast in both English and Spanish, featuring tropical music programs for Washington's growing Latino population, mostly from Puerto Rico, Cuba and the Dominican Republic. By the late 1960s, WFAN was running its Spanish-language format full time, the first in the Washington area.

=== FCC trouble ===
In the mid-1970s, United Broadcasting, the owner of WFAN-FM, WOOK and WFAN-TV, along with semi-satellite WMET-TV, was beset by legal issues. In September 1975, the Federal Communications Commission (FCC) cited WOOK for broadcasting fraudulent advertising and denied renewal of its license.

Faced with losing one of its two radio signals, United decided to preserve the more popular R&B format of WOOK. In December 1976, it moved the R&B format and WOOK call letters to 100.3 FM. Meanwhile, the WFAN call sign and Spanish tropical format, which had a smaller audience, moved to 1340 AM. The AM station's license expired April 22, 1978, and the 1340 AM allocation was turned over to WYCB. The decision to sacrifice the Spanish-language format led to complaints to the FCC from the local Hispanic community. Unlike equivalent bodies such as the Canadian Radio and Television Commission, the FCC does not concern itself with the type of programming broadcast by licensed stations, so it did not take action. In February 1984, WOOK rebranded as WDJY calling itself "DJ 100".

Starting in October 1990, the station began playing smooth jazz as "Jazzy 100", and would subsequently change its call letters to WJZE.

=== Oldies WBIG-FM ===
WJZE was acquired by Colfax Broadcasting and adopted an oldies format as WBIG-FM "Oldies 100" at 4 p.m. on June 3, 1993. The station was sold to Chancellor Broadcasting in 1996. Chancellor then merged with Capstar Broadcasting to form AMFM, Inc. in 1998. Clear Channel Communications purchased AMFM in October 1999. Clear Channel later changed its name to iHeartMedia, Inc.

As an oldies outlet, WBIG-FM originally played mostly Top 40 hits from the 1950s, 1960s and 1970s. In the early 2000s, many 1950s and early 1960s hits were dropped from the playlist. In 2002, the station changed its name from "Oldies 100" to "Big 100". It also aired the Saturday Night dance party playing mostly 1970s disco and dance music.

=== Classic Hits ===
WBIG-FM "evolved" from oldies to classic hits at 5 p.m. on April 3, 2006, featuring hits of the 1970s and 1980s. The last song to be played under its oldies format was "Shout" by The Isley Brothers, while the first song under the classic hits format was "You Ain't Seen Nothing Yet" by Bachman Turner Overdrive. This was accompanied with a slight branding change to "Big 100.3". The changeover was not announced, and the new format saw several of the disc jockeys removed. Jeff "Goldy" Gold, who spent 12 years at WBIG, was the morning host at WFVL in Fayetteville, North Carolina, from September 2005 to February 2009. In 2012, Goldy became host of Good Morning Fayetteville on WFNC. Kathy Whiteside moved to middays at WLIF in Baltimore, Johnny Dark worked at WTTR in Westminster, Maryland, until his death in September 2016, and Ira Melman worked for a while at WTOP-FM, and later for Voice of America (VOA) in Washington.

WBIG was the first station in the U.S. to work directly with one of the Beatles. Ringo Starr hosted and voiced the commercials for the "BIG Ringo Starr Art Show" in March 2007. It was the first time that artwork from all four Beatles appeared in the same exhibition. Proceeds from the sales of art benefited Ringo's charity The Lotus Foundations.

=== Classic rock ===
After the spring 2009 format change of rival classic rock station WTGB to adult contemporary, WBIG-FM tried to appease listeners of WTGB by shifting to a musical position in between light classic hits and slightly heavier classic rock, but still not becoming a full-fledged classic rock station. Four months later, oldies outlet WJZW (now WMAL-FM) flipped to mainstream rock (mostly heavy classic rock with a few newer songs). Throughout 2010, WVRX slowly siphoned listeners from WBIG, especially in WVRX's target demographic of men 25-54. By the third week of August 2010, WBIG had plummeted to 14th in the overall Arbitron radio ratings after rising to 8th place after the demise of WTGB.

On August 30, 2010, the station fired its morning show staff, host Jon Ballard and news anchor Bill Stabler. After being fired, Ballard called into Elliot in the Morning on WWDC, where Ballard worked afternoons until 2006. He began to discuss the incident with Elliot Segal. Reportedly, although Ballard did not criticize WBIG-FM or Clear Channel, WWDC management cut off the conversation by ending the show early and "dumping" to music, a process normally used to avoid content that would garner FCC fines. After Ballard's firing, the station shifted its playlist completely to classic rock, and began promoting the fact that it was now running with no disc jockeys. By October, DJs would return, with Lisa Berigan doing middays, Doc Reno doing afternoon drive, and Big Rig doing nights. On November 20, Tommy Griffiths became the station's morning host. In July 2016, "Big 100.3" reverted to the "Big 100" branding.

Beginning with the 2022 NFL season, WBIG-FM took over as the broadcast home of Washington Commanders games, replacing a joint simulcast of WMAL-FM, WSBN, and WTEM. Don Geronimo, at the time the station's morning host, was fired after making disparaging comments on-air about a female sports reporter for WUSA (channel 9) during the team's 2023 training camp.

WBIG-FM's last two live DJs, Berigan and new morning host Paul Jaxon, were laid off in November 2024 as part of a large round of staffing cuts at iHeartMedia. The station's broadcast day is now entirely voice-tracked.

== Short-spaced signal ==
WBIG-FM is short-spaced to Media, Pennsylvania-licensed WRNB, a Radio One station in the Philadelphia market which transmits from the Roxborough section of the city. The transmitters of the two stations are around 131 miles (211 km) apart, 29 miles (47 km) short of the FCC's minimum distance guidelines for Class B stations, which is 150 miles (240 km).

The two stations are grandfathered for this short spacing of their allocations, and operate with some interference between Baltimore and the Pennsylvania–Maryland state line.
