= WPRS (FM) =

Radio station in Prince Frederick, Maryland (Washington, D.C.)

- Prince Frederick, Maryland; United States
- Broadcast area: Washington metropolitan area; Chesapeake Bay
- Frequency: 92.7 MHz (HD Radio)
- Branding: Praise 92.7 & 95.9

Programming
- Language: English
- Format: Urban contemporary gospel

Ownership
- Owner: Urban One; (Radio One Licenses, LLC)
- Sister stations: WKYS; WLNO; WMMJ; WOL; WYCB

History
- First air date: August 1, 1971
- Former call signs: WESM (1971–1973); WMJS (1973–2000); WBZS-FM (2000–2006); WWXT (2006–2017); WDCJ (2017–2025)
- Call sign meaning: "Praise"

Technical information
- Licensing authority: FCC
- Facility ID: 43277
- Class: A
- ERP: 2,150 watts
- HAAT: 169 meters (554 ft)
- Transmitter coordinates: 38°38′59.3″N 76°46′24.3″W
- Translator: 95.9 W240DJ (Washington)

Links
- Public license information: Public file; LMS
- Webcast: Listen live; Listen live (via Audacy); Listen live (via iHeartRadio)
- Website: praisedc.com

WPRS (92.7 FM), known on air as "Praise 92.7 & 95.9" is an urban contemporary gospel formatted radio station licensed to Prince Frederick, Maryland, and serving the southeastern Washington metropolitan area. The station is owned by Urban One.

== History ==
The station signed on August 1, 1971, as WESM, a local station serving Calvert County, Maryland, with country music. Original owners George Gautney and Carl Jones sold the station to Mel Gollub's MJS Communications in 1973. As WMJS, the station continued as country at first, but later flipped to adult contemporary in 1985, and again to easy listening in 1987.

In 2000, Mega Communications bought the station. Under the new callsign WBZS-FM, it joined a simulcast with WBPS-FM 94.3 in Warrenton, Virginia, to create a metro-wide network for its "La Nueva Mega" Spanish-language adult contemporary format. In 2005, the network flipped to Spanish oldies branded as "Mega Clasica".

Immediately after the sale, efforts began to build a low-power FM station to return local service to Calvert County. WMJS-LP, taking the now-unused callsign, signed on in 2003.

Red Zebra Broadcasting, headed by Washington Redskins owner Daniel Snyder, purchased the two stations along with WKDL (730 AM) in January 2006. Snyder's goal was a sports talk radio competitor to WTEM (980 AM). The three-station network was known as "Triple X ESPN Radio", with 92.7 FM gaining the WWXT callsign to match. Snyder bought WTEM itself in 2008, after which the network was simply known as "ESPN 980".

Snyder began selling his radio properties in 2017. WWXT was sold to Urban One on April 20; the station was flipped to a simulcast of the urban adult contemporary format of WMMJ (102.3 FM) on May 1, and the call sign changed to WDCJ on May 19.

On October 16, 2025, WDCJ changed its format from a simulcast of WMMJ to urban contemporary gospel, branded as "Praise 92.7 & 95.9". The format moved from what was WPRS-FM 104.1, which took the WDCJ call sign.
