= Donnie Simpson =

American broadcaster (born 1954)

- Born: January 30, 1954 (age 72); Detroit, Michigan, U.S.
- Occupations: Disc jockey; television personality
- Years active: 1969-present
- Partner: Pamela Gibson (m. 1973)
- Website: https://donniesimpson.com

Donnie Simpson is a longtime American radio DJ as well as a television and movie personality. He hosted The Donnie Simpson Morning Show on Washington, D.C., radio station WPGC-FM from March 1993 to January 29, 2010. Currently, he hosts The Donnie Simpson Show on D.C.-based radio station WMMJ-FM (Majic 102.3 FM), which began airing on August 17, 2015. Donnie is the first urban-format radio personality to have an annual salary over $1 million without being syndicated.

In 2003, Simpson, through his agent and longtime friend, George Parker, inked a 6-year, 8-figure deal with WPGC-FM making Simpson the highest paid African-American radio personality ever without syndication. He was Billboard's Radio Personality of the Year and Program Director of the Year. On October 29, 2020, during a live radio broadcast induction ceremony from multiple locations and across multiple audio platforms, Donnie, along with six other broadcasters, was inducted into the Radio Hall of Fame.

== Early life ==
Donnie was born on January 30, 1954, and is the son of a record shop owner. Having been exposed to multiple genres of music early on through working at his mother's record shop, Donnie began his radio career at age 15 with WJLB in Detroit, MI where his on-air moniker was Donnie "The Love Bug” Simpson. He quickly became known for his sultry voice, warm smile, and piercing green eyes.

== Career ==
After eight years at WJLB in Detroit, Donnie relocated to Washington, D.C., in 1977 where he began working at WRC-FM, now WKYS, as a DJ and program director. He remained with WKYS for 15 years through its format migration from Disco-based Rhythmic Contemporary Hits to Urban Contemporary in the 1980s. He hosted The Donnie Simpson Morning Show in morning drive for over 30 years. In 1981, Donnie landed his first television job on WRC-TV, hired as back-up anchor for the George Michael Sports Machine show on NBC's Washington outlet. Soon after he hosted Video Soul, a music video show on BET and many other network specials.

In 1983, Donnie was recruited by Robert L. Johnson, founder of Black Entertainment Television BET, to host the network's primetime music video show, Video Soul. Simpson remained with the show until its cancellation in 1997. Over several decades, Simpson has hosted many network specials and tributes. He has interviewed well-known stars, including Stevie Wonder, Prince, Elton John, Aretha Franklin, David Bowie, Janet Jackson, James Brown, Usher, Jay-Z, Notorious BIG, Whitney Houston, Tupac, Madonna, Mariah Carey, Smokey Robinson, and many others. On June 1, 2023, Donnie Simpson's Video Soul premiered on BET+.

Donnie also launched the Donnie Simpson Podcast Network (DSPN) releasing the first season of The Donnie Simpson Show Podcast on December 8, 2021. The podcast video is also available on Donnie's YouTube channel where he can be seen interviewing celebrity guests including Smokey Robinson, D.L. Hughley, Regina Belle, Tichina Arnold and more.

Donnie retired in 2010, but returned to radio and television on August 17, 2015, this time on WMMJ (a Radio One station based in the DMV) to host The Donnie Simpson Show. The show aired Monday through Friday from 3:00 to 7:00 PM ET on Majic 102.3 FM. On February 5, 2016, Donnie After Dark (hosted by Donnie Simpson) began airing on TV One. On January 9, 2021, Reach Media launched The Donnie Simpson Weekend Show, a two-hour syndicated program for adult R&B-formatted radio stations.

After 55 years on the radio, Donnie announced that Friday, January 12, 2024, would be the last day of “The Donnie Simpson Show” on MAJIC 102.3. While stressing he is not retiring, he plans to refocus on the next chapter, including his podcast and the reboot of the TV show, Video Soul.

== Achievements ==
In 1988, Donnie was recognized as both the best (Top) radio personality and Top program director in the nation by Billboard Magazine, the world's most influential music industry publication. He received both Billboard's prestigious Radio Personality of the Year and Program Director of the Year awards. In 2004, Donnie was inducted into the BET Walk of Fame. In 2015, he was inducted into the Rhythm and Blues Music Hall of Fame, the only non-musician so honored at that point. On October 29, 2020, Donnie, along with six other honorees, was inducted into the Radio Hall of Fame in a live two-hour ceremony broadcast live on radio stations across the country.

== Filmography ==
Year	Title	Role	Notes	Ref.
1983–1996	Video Soul	Himself		
1985	Krush Groove	Contest MC		
1987	Disorderlies	Roller Rink DJ		
1996	Martin	Himself/D'Andre Simpson	2 episodes	
1997	The Jamie Foxx Show	Dr. Green Eyes	Episode: "Step Up to Get Down"	
2016	Donnie After Dark	Himself	Executive producer	
2016	Almost Christmas	Radio DJ (voice)		
2021	Donnie Simpson Video Soul	Himself	Executive producer	
2022	Urban One Honors 2022	Himself	TV special at TV One	
