= WKDV (AM) =

- Chantilly, Virginia; United States
- Broadcast area: Northern Virginia
- Frequency: 1460 kHz
- Branding: La Ley WKDV

Programming
- Format: Regional Mexican

Ownership
- Owner: Metro Radio, Inc.
- Sister stations: WTNT

History
- First air date: October 1, 1957
- Former call signs: WPRW (1957–1993)
- Call sign meaning: Kids Virginia

Technical information
- Licensing authority: FCC
- Facility ID: 8672
- Class: D
- Power: 500 watts day; 60 watts night
- Transmitter coordinates: 38°51′18″N 77°22′27″W

Links
- Public license information: Public file; LMS
- Website: somoslaley.com

WKDV is a Regional Mexican formatted broadcast radio station licensed to Chantilly, Virginia, serving Northern Virginia. WKDV is owned and operated by Metro Radio, Inc.

The station was silent for most of the period from December 2020 to March 2022, after the 11-acre (4.5 ha) site in Manassas, Virginia, which had hosted the broadcast towers since the 1960s was sold. It has since moved to a new tower in Fair Lakes, Virginia.

== Former format ==
In the 1990s, the station was a Radio AAHS affiliate, which played children's music.

== Translator ==
In addition to the main station, WKDV is relayed by an FM translator to widen its broadcast area.

Call sign	Frequency	City of license	FID	ERP (W)	HAAT	Class	FCC info
W249DX	97.7 FM	Reston, Virginia	202056	50	110 m (361 ft)	D	LMS
