= WYCB =

Urban gospel radio station in Washington, D.C.

- Washington, D.C.; United States
- Broadcast area: Washington, D.C.
- Frequency: 1340 kHz
- Branding: Spirit 1340 AM

Programming
- Language: English
- Format: Urban gospel

Ownership
- Owner: Urban One; (Radio One Licenses, LLC)
- Sister stations: WKYS; WLNO; WMMJ; WOL; WPRS

History
- First air date: August 16, 1978
- Call sign meaning: "We're Your Community Broadcaster"

Technical information
- Licensing authority: FCC
- Facility ID: 7038
- Class: C
- Power: 1,000 watts
- Transmitter coordinates: 38°57′19.4″N 77°0′13.9″W

Links
- Public license information: Public file; LMS
- Webcast: Listen live
- Website: www.myspiritdc.com

WYCB (1340 AM) is a radio station in Washington, D.C., featuring an urban gospel format known as "Spirit 1340 AM". Owned by Urban One, its studios are in Silver Spring, Maryland; the transmitter, shared with WOL, is located at Fort Totten in Washington, D.C.

WYCB is the oldest gospel radio station in Washington; it was also the first contemporary gospel outlet in the United States.

== History ==
=== Challenging WOOK's license ===
The Washington Community Broadcasting Company filed on August 31, 1966, for a construction permit for a new radio station in Washington, D.C., as a challenge to the license of WOOK, an African American outlet which went on the air in 1940. Washington Community Broadcasting also sought to operate the companion television station, WOOK-TV (channel 14, later WFAN-TV), for which it was one of two challengers to the license. Washington Community's vice president was journalist Drew Pearson; other principals in the challenger included Pearson's friend Jack Anderson, a newscaster for WTOP-TV, and an art critic. Earlier in 1966, the FCC had given WOOK radio a full-term license renewal but fined it for various logging rule violations.

In 1969, the Federal Communications Commission (FCC) designated Washington Community's challenges alongside WOOK's and WFAN-TV's license renewals for hearing. For WOOK radio, the FCC's questions revolved around the broadcast of false advertisements. The group also charged that WOOK was the outlet for a numbers racket, using false Bible verses to conceal that day's number; FCC rules prohibit the broadcast of information related to illegal gambling. Washington Community became the only challenger for channel 14 when another group, Washington Civic Television, dropped out and merged—bringing Truman-era Assistant Attorney General Thurman Arnold into its fold. It then dropped out of the television fight in 1970 after the death of Pearson the year before.

Hearings for WOOK stretched until September 1975, when the FCC denied its license renewal but did not resolve the status of the Washington Community Broadcasting application, so that the group could cure financial deficiencies in its application. It would not be until August 24, 1976, that Washington Community Broadcasting Company's ten-year-old application was granted. To preserve its African-American-oriented programming, WOOK swapped formats and call signs with co-owned Spanish-language station WFAN (100.3 FM), and subsequently left the air on April 22, 1978.

=== On air ===
In June 1978, the new licensee of 1340 kHz selected and received the call letters WYCB for its station. The station went on the air that August 15 and carried a gospel format. As a result of the issues faced by WOOK, the new station did not sell air time to ministers, unlike its predecessor on the frequency. However, the station faced turmoil within months of beginning operations when, in October, eight managers resigned from WYCB in a dispute over finances and the new venture's direction. The 12 years of legal battles had also exhausted much of the ownership's financial resources. After another conflict, general manager Cathy Hughes left the station in 1980 and bought WOL with her husband in a distress sale.

Three years after putting the frequency back into use, Washington Community Broadcasting sold the station to Howard Sanders Communications Corporation, controlled by the station's general manager, for $1.375 million in 1981. Under Sanders, WYCB was sued by Broadcast Music, Inc., in 1985, for copyright infringement of several songs; BMI sought an injunction to force the station to no longer play music it licensed.

By the late 1980s, however, Sanders Communications's financial position had deteriorated. The company filed for bankruptcy in 1988, and on December 11, 1989, the station was sold at foreclosure auction to Broadcast Holdings, Inc., owned by G. Cabell Williams III, for $150,000.

In 1997, Radio One (today known as Urban One) acquired WYCB from Williams for $3.75 million. Even in 1998, WYCB was one of the few 24-hour gospel outlets in the United States. Its 25th anniversary event in 2003 was hosted by Al Sharpton and featured Yolanda Adams, Shirley Caesar and Richard Smallwood as featured guests.
