= WLXE =

Radio station in Rockville, Maryland, serving Washington, D.C.

Coordinates: 39°05′50″N 77°09′04″W

- Rockville, Maryland; United States
- Broadcast area: Washington metropolitan area
- Frequency: 1600 kHz
- Branding: La Que Buena 1600

Programming
- Format: Spanish music

Ownership
- Owner: Multicultural Broadcasting; (Multicultural Radio Broadcasting Licensee, LLC)

History
- First air date: May 1947
- Former call signs: WOOK (1947–1951); WINX (1951–2000); WNNY (2000); WKDM (2000–2003)
- Former frequencies: 1590 kHz (1947–1951)

Technical information
- Licensing authority: FCC
- Facility ID: 54506
- Class: D
- Power: 1,015 watts day; 120 watts night

Links
- Public license information: Public file; LMS
- Webcast: https://tunein.com/radio/WLXE-1600-AM-s30135/

WLXE is a radio station broadcasting on 1600 kHz in the medium wave AM band. Its studios and transmitters are located in Rockville, Maryland, and it serves the Washington metropolitan area. WLXE broadcasts music programming in the Spanish language. Its transmitter and antenna array are located off Hungerford Drive (Maryland Route 355), near the northern border of the city of Rockville. WLXE is under ownership of Multicultural Broadcasting.

== History ==
The station was established in 1947 as Silver Spring-based WOOK, the first station of Richard Eaton's United Broadcasting with African American programming. Four years later, Eaton bought WINX (1340 AM), a station in Washington, D.C. proper. In order to retain both stations and meet multiple ownership rules, the Silver Spring station license was relocated to Rockville, Maryland—which under pre-1950 Census Bureau guidelines was not part of the Washington metropolitan area—on 1600 kHz. Additionally, Eaton switched the two stations' call letters, resulting in WOOK as the new 1340 in Washington, D.C., and WINX as the station at 1600 in Rockville.

Through to the late 1970s, WINX broadcast a Top-40 format. It was located at 8 Baltimore Road off Church Street near the intersection of Veirs Mill Road and Rockville Pike. It was consistently the third-ranked Top 40 station in the ratings, following WPGC and WEAM. The station shifted to an oldies format in March 1993 (simulcast on FM 94.3 in Warrenton, Virginia), then followed by a short stint as top-40 again around 1998, in the FM-dominated market. During the 1990s, WINX was the flagship for American University athletics; Chuck Timanus served as lead play-by-play announcer, with his blind son Eddie Timanus, later a famous game show contestant and sportswriter, serving as a statistician.

In December 1998, it was sold to Mega Communications, then Multicultural Broadcasting. At that time, it converted to Spanish-language programming. The station was assigned the call sign WLXE in 2003.
