= WOOK (AM) =

Radio station in Washington, D.C. (1940–1978)

- Washington, D.C.; United States
- Broadcast area: Washington, D.C.
- Frequency: 1340 kHz

Ownership
- Owner: United Broadcasting Company

History
- First air date: 1940
- Last air date: April 22, 1978
- Former call signs: WINX (1940–1951); WOOK (1951–1976); WFAN (1976–1978)

Technical information
- Power: 1,000 watts (day); 250 watts (night)

WOOK was a radio station that operated on 1340 AM in Washington, D.C., United States, from 1940 to 1978. Owned by Richard Eaton's United Broadcasting, the station was known for its programming for the African-American community in the Washington metropolitan area; before that, in the 1940s, it was an independent station owned for several years by the Washington Post.

WOOK, which spawned an FM station (WFAN) and a TV station (WOOK-TV channel 14, later WFAN-TV), had its license revoked by the Federal Communications Commission in 1975 amid accusations that it was being used in an illegal numbers racket. In 1976, with the station's fate nearly sealed, WOOK became Spanish-language WFAN, in a format swap that allowed the Black-formatted WOOK intellectual property to stay alive. WFAN ceased operating on April 22, 1978; on August 15, WYCB began broadcasting on its frequency.

== History ==
=== WINX ===
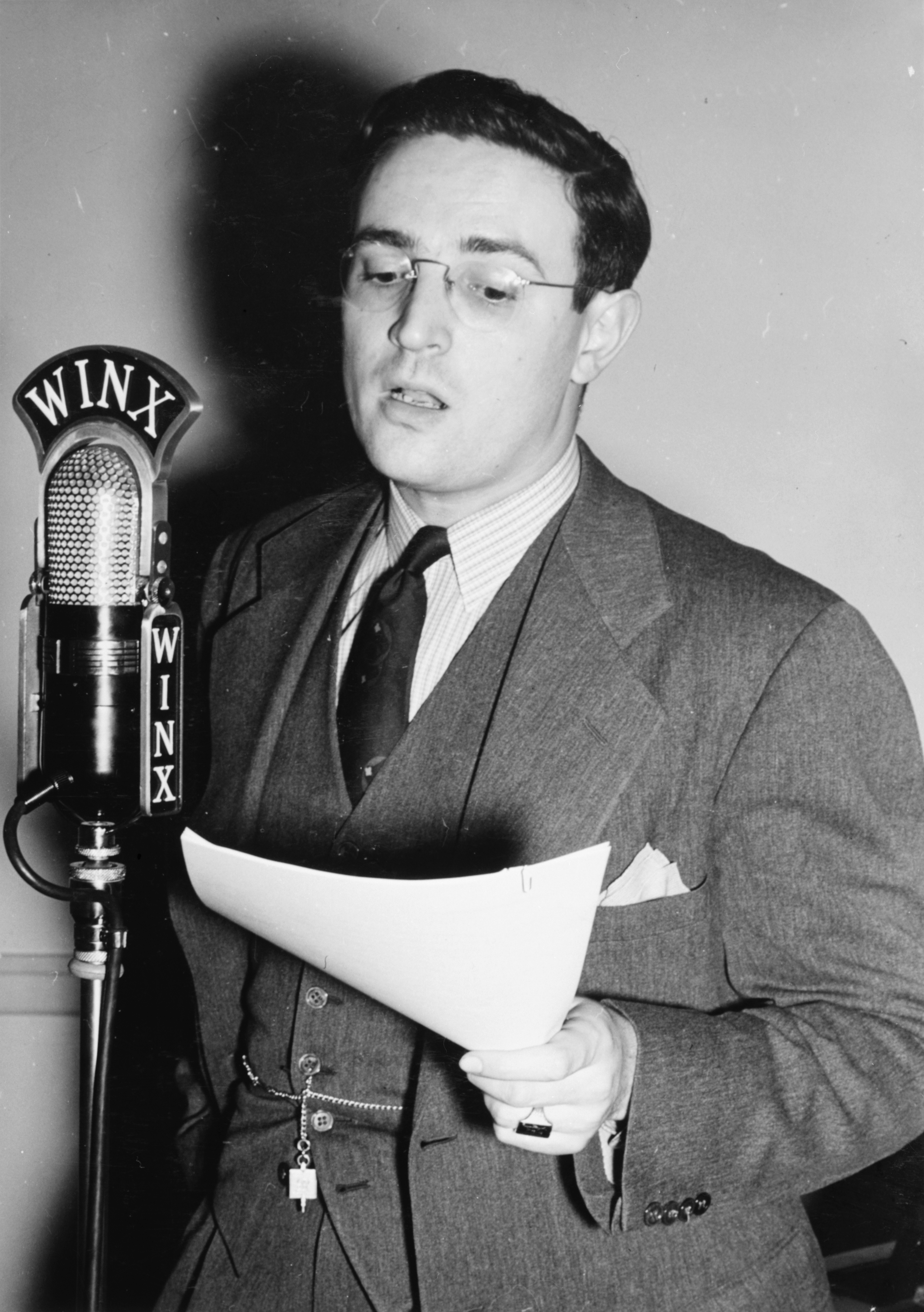
William P. Gottlieb at the WINX microphone in 1940

WINX went on the air in 1940 at 1310 kHz as Washington's fifth radio station. The Federal Communications Commission (FCC) had previously granted a construction permit to attorney Lawrence J. Heller on February 13, including a 50-watt synchronous amplifier to give the station full metropolitan coverage. The amplifier was located at American University. The station relocated the next year to 1340 when NARBA came into effect. In 1942, Heller sold minority stakes in WINX to Richard K. Lyon and Herbert M. Bratter.

The Washington Post acquired WINX in 1944 for $500,000; it was the highest price ever paid for a "local" radio station like WINX that broadcast with 250 watts. The Post also got into the early days of FM radio when it acquired station W3XO, later WINX-FM, from Jansky and Bailey in 1945. The Post owned the station until 1948, when it contracted to buy a majority share in WTOP (1500 AM) from CBS; the deal would require the newspaper to sell WINX and its two boosters but allowed CBS to gain full ownership of KQW (today's KCBS) in San Francisco. William Banks, owner of Philadelphia station WHAT, bought WINX AM for $130,000 in 1949; the Post retained WINX-FM.

=== From WINX to WOOK ===
In 1951, Richard Eaton, whose United Broadcasting Company owned radio station WOOK (1590 kHz) in Silver Spring, Maryland, and newly signed on Washington FM outlet WFAN (100.3 FM), bought WINX from the Banks Independent Broadcasting Company for $115,000. WOOK, established in 1947, was Eaton's first radio station; Eaton had previously been a commentator with WINX and then with the Mutual Broadcasting System. In order to retain both stations and meet multiple ownership rules, the Silver Spring station license was relocated to Rockville, Maryland—which under pre-1950 Census Bureau guidelines was not part of the Washington metropolitan area—on 1600 kHz. Additionally, Eaton switched the two stations' call letters, resulting in WOOK as the new 1340 in Washington, D.C., and WINX as the station at 1600 in Rockville. The local of the International Brotherhood of Electrical Workers asked the FCC to reconsider approving the WINX-WOOK swap because United's non-union staff had replaced the former WINX's union technicians.

WOOK, both on 1590 before 1951 and on 1340 thereafter, broke ground in Washington radio. While Eaton had initially intended to make WOOK a talk outlet, the African-American printer of Eaton's suburban newspapers suggested that he cover Washington's growing Black population. It was just the second such station aimed at a Black audience, after WDIA in Memphis, Tennessee, which then had an all-white air staff. Hal Jackson, who had started his career at WINX with a show titled "The Bronze Review" and was laughed at when he proposed to the Post that it cover Homestead Grays Negro league baseball, launched the first regular African American-hosted program in Washington over WOOK (when it was at 1590).

In 1956, WOOK relocated its transmitter to several lots purchased by Eaton in the Chillum Castle Manor subdivision, at 1st Place, NE.

=== Television ===
The success of WOOK as the radio station for black Washington led Eaton to expand into television. In 1962, WOOK moved into a new, purpose-built radio and television studio at 5321 1st Place NE, and WOOK-TV channel 14 took to the air on March 5, 1963. Channel 14 was, like WOOK radio, primarily oriented at an African-American audience; it became WFAN-TV in 1968. The station ceased broadcasting on February 12, 1972, as United faced mounting legal challenges to its various licenses and consequent financial reverses. United asked the FCC to keep the WFAN-TV license active while it tried to sell it. Still, because United itself had no intention of restoring service, the stations' licenses were deleted in 1974 after United was ordered to return them to air itself.

=== License challenge ===
Early in 1966, the FCC renewed WOOK's license but assessed a $7,500 fine for various technical violations. However, United's troubles deepened when, on August 31, a competing application was filed for the 1340 frequency by Washington Community Broadcasting. In 1969, the Federal Communications Commission designated Washington Community's challenges alongside WOOK's and WFAN-TV's license renewals for hearing. For WOOK radio, the FCC's questions revolved around the broadcast of false advertisements. More seriously, the group also charged that WOOK was used in a numbers racket using fake Bible citations read over the air by ministers who bought air time on the station. In one program, broadcast over WOOK on June 8, 1969, a preacher was cited as saying, "I know the Lord blessed through the 82nd Psalm and the 7th verse", when 782 had been the winning number in the local undercover lottery on May 26. That same minister had previously promised to send listeners a "Bible scripture that is a sure blessing" in exchange for $2.

Hearings for WOOK stretched until September 1975, when the FCC denied its license renewal but did not resolve the Washington Community Broadcasting application status so that the group could cure financial deficiencies in its application. Eaton defended WOOK, saying the FCC's principal witness was a disgruntled former employee and a convicted felon. It would not be until August 24, 1976, that Washington Community Broadcasting Company's ten-year-old competing application for the 1340 frequency was granted.

=== Change to WFAN and closure ===
When it became clear that 1340's license was doomed, Eaton opted to sacrifice the Spanish-language programming airing at 100.3 FM to move WOOK's intellectual unit there. On December 24, 1976, WOOK became WFAN and the FM station became WOOK. Attorneys for Washington Community Broadcasting, the group set to take over the 1340 frequency, called the switch a "flimflam" and rued it was out of their control. However, as April 22, 1978—the final day of broadcasting for the WFAN license—loomed, Hispanic leaders in metropolitan Washington were left to evaluate their options; they attempted to purchase WGTB, which Georgetown University was selling at the time, but the University of the District of Columbia acquired the station, rendering the backup offer from the Roman Catholic Archdiocese of Washington—which would have run the station as a Spanish-language outlet—moot.

After WFAN left the air, the new station at 1340 AM, WYCB, began operations on August 15.
