= WMMJ =

Radio station in Bethesda, Maryland (Washington, D.C.)

- Bethesda, Maryland; United States
- Broadcast area: Washington metropolitan area
- Frequency: 102.3 MHz (HD Radio)
- Branding: Majic 102.3

Programming
- Language: English
- Format: Urban oldies–AC
- Affiliations: Rickey Smiley Morning Show

Ownership
- Owner: Urban One; (Radio One Licenses, LLC)
- Sister stations: WKYS; WLNO; WOL; WPRS; WYCB

History
- First air date: November 12, 1961
- Former call signs: WHFS (1961–1983); WTKS (1983–1987)
- Call sign meaning: "Majic"

Technical information
- Licensing authority: FCC
- Facility ID: 54712
- Class: A
- ERP: 2,900 watts
- HAAT: 146 meters (479 ft)
- Transmitter coordinates: 38°56′10″N 77°05′31″W

Links
- Public license information: Public file; LMS
- Webcast: Listen live; Listen live (via Audacy); Listen live (via iHeartRadio)
- Website: mymajicdc.com

WMMJ (102.3 FM), known on air as "Majic 102.3", is an urban oldies-leaning urban adult contemporary radio station owned by Urban One in the Washington metropolitan area. It is co-owned with WKYS, WLNO, WOL, WPRS and WYCB and has studios located in Silver Spring, Maryland. It is licensed to Bethesda, but its transmitter is located on the American University campus in Tenleytown. During the 1960s, 1970s and early 1980s, the station had been home to the original "progressive rock" formatted WHFS, which later migrated to the higher powered Annapolis, Maryland-based 99.1 frequency.

WMMJ broadcasts in the HD Radio format.

== WHFS (1961–1983) ==
On March 20, 1960, High Fidelity Broadcasters, Inc., applied to the Federal Communications Commission (FCC) for a new FM radio station on 102.3 MHz in Bethesda; the commission granted the construction permit on July 20. The station went on air on November 12, 1961, as WHFS; it was the first FM stereo station in the Washington area.

== WTKS (1983–1987) ==
With WHFS having moved to 99.1, the 102.3 frequency went silent before emerging as WTKS, which was originally announced as a talk outlet to complement Outlet-owned WTOP (1500 AM) and one of just two talk stations in Greater Washington. However, in a surprise move, WTKS debuted on September 23 as an easy listening station using syndicated music from Carson Radio Services of Providence, Rhode Island; one source told Billboard that Outlet sought the call sign WRLX ("Relax") for the station. However, the new call sign did not come to pass. A 1984 profile of the Washington radio market in Billboard explained that WTKS had been kept since it appeared next to WTOP in the ratings books, while the stations had been unable to co-locate because WTKS was licensed to Bethesda, not Washington.

In December 1984, the Carson music format was dropped for the adult contemporary Format 41 from Transtar Radio Networks; the station rebranded as Magic 102. However, WTKS remained near the bottom of the market ratings, finishing 21st of 22nd stations in the spring 1985 Arbitron survey and dead last out of 20 outlets in the fall 1986 book.

== WMMJ ==
In January 1987, to match its Magic moniker, the station changed its call sign to WMMJ, remaining an adult contemporary outlet. A much larger change came later that year when Cathy Hughes purchased the station from Outlet for $7.5 million as part of Outlet's acquisition of WASH-FM 97.1. Outlet retained the rights to use Format 41 in Washington, but Hughes initially retained the adult contemporary format. Radio & Records described its format in 1988 as being similar to WMAL (630 AM) on FM.

On February 27, 1989, WMMJ flipped from adult contemporary to an urban adult contemporary format reaching the baby boomer audience and competing with WXTR-FM 104.1. The station's share of the market more than tripled in its first ratings survey after the switch.

In 2000, WMMJ acquired the syndication rights of the Tom Joyner Morning Show from rival WHUR-FM. The move of Joyner to WMMJ vaulted it into the top ten in Washington; interest was so great that the station had to hire three switchboard operators. By 2003, WMMJ was the top-rated radio station in the market. In the summer of 2008, it also became home to Mo'Nique in the afternoon until March 18, 2009, when Mo'Nique decided leave to "further her career in television, film, and comedy".

On June 23, 2010, WMMJ's live airstaff were let go in a surprise shakeup, despite the station posting its best numbers in the Washington Arbitrons. The shakeup began in April 2010, when its GM and PD were let go. WMMJ hired former WHUR morning man John Monds to be the new afternoon drive personality from 3 to 7 PM and Courtney Hicks as the new midday personality from 10 AM to 3 PM. Michel Wright has since replaced Courtney Hicks in Middays, and Adimu replaced John Monds in afternoon drive, and finally Donnie Simpson replaced Adimu, all formerly of WPGC (except John Monds). Monds was moved into the 7 p.m.-midnight timeslot.

Since the airstaff change, the playlist has been steadily leaning toward a Jammin' Oldies direction due to declining ratings; however, the actual format still remains on the urban AC side of the line.

On August 3, 2015, WMMJ announced their new slogan as The Real Sound of the DMV, and also made a surprise announcement that Donnie Simpson would return to the airwaves after retiring from his morning show on WPGC-FM in January 2010. The Donnie Simpson Show returned on August 17, 2015, and aired Monday through Friday from 3-7 p.m. (ET) until his departure in January 2024. In January 2016, Russ Parr moved over from sister station WKYS to WMMJ to replace Tom Joyner after 17 years at the station.

To bolster coverage in the southern and eastern portions of the Washington market, Radio One purchased WWXT (92.7 FM) from Red Zebra Broadcasting. As WDCJ, that station began simulcasting WMMJ on May 1, 2017. On October 16, 2025, WDCJ dropped the WMMJ simulcast to pick up the "Praise" urban contemporary gospel format, which moved from WPRS-FM 104.1.
