= WTNT (AM) =

Radio station in Alexandria, Virginia

- Alexandria, Virginia; United States
- Broadcast area: Washington metropolitan area
- Frequency: 730 kHz
- Branding: La Mega Capital

Programming
- Language: Spanish
- Format: Contemporary hit radio

Ownership
- Owner: Metro Radio
- Sister stations: WKDV

History
- First air date: December 10, 1945
- Former call signs: WPIK (1945–1980); WPKX (1980–1982); WRMR (1982–1983); WPKX (1983–1986); WCXR (1986); WCPT (1986–1987); WPRD (1987); WCPT (1987–1995); WBZS (1995–2000); WKDL (2000–2006); WXTR (2006–2010)
- Call sign meaning: "Trinitrotoluene" (original slogan for the original WTNT was "Dynamite Talk")

Technical information
- Licensing authority: FCC
- Facility ID: 70036
- Class: D
- Power: 8,000 watts (day); 25 watts (night)
- Transmitter coordinates: 38°44′43.01″N 77°5′57.98″W
- Translators: 92.9 W225CN (Centreville); 97.5 W248BN (Alexandria)

Links
- Public license information: Public file; LMS
- Webcast: Listen live
- Website: lamegacapital.com

WTNT (730 kHz) is a commercial Spanish hits AM radio station licensed to Alexandria, Virginia, and serving the Washington metropolitan area. WTNT is owned and operated by Metro Radio. AM 730 is a Canadian and Mexican clear-channel frequency.

The station flipped formats to a Spanish music and talk format dubbed "La Capital" on December 1, 2013.

== History ==
WTNT signed on as WPIK December 10, 1945. For many years this station operated as the AM side to country station WXRA (105.9 FM), and for another period as WPKX "Kix Country". For a time 730 simulcast 105.9's next incarnation, classic rock, as WCXR. For a short while in the mid-1980s, the station featured a soul oldies format. It was also WRMR with a nostalgia format for a very short while. In 1987, it took the call letters WCPT, and became WBZS in May 1995.

The station was owned by Metropolitan Broadcasting until 1989, Westinghouse Broadcasting from 1989 to 1993, and Viacom from 1993 to 1997. In July 1990, WCPT adopted a simulcast of CNN Headline News. From May 1995 to April 1999, WBZS offered a business news brokered financial advice format.

Then, Mega Communications bought the station and installed a Mexican/tropical music format as "Radio Capital", which it simulcast with its co-owned WBZS-FM 92.7 in Prince Frederick, Maryland, and WBPS-FM 94.3 in Warrenton, Virginia. Washington Redskins owner Daniel Snyder bought all three stations in 2006. The new three-station network ran a new sports radio formart as "Triple X ESPN Radio". The WXTR calls were installed at this point; the call letters were used in the past on different stations in the Washington area on two different stations (at 104.1 FM and 820 AM). In 2008, Snyder bought his network's primary competitor, WTEM (980 AM), and WXTR switched to ESPN Deportes Radio.

On October 10, 2010, WXTR switched to a pop and soul oldies format. Radio Business Report quoted station management as saying the station would fill "a void in the marketplace". However, this change lasted only several days, as Red Zebra announced that WXTR would be sold off to Metro Radio that October 18. The WTNT call letters were moved from the 570 kHz facility, which changed to the WSPZ call letters; the station also picked up WTNT's previous talk format, which had been dropped for sports talk in early September.

On December 1, 2013, WTNT changed its format from talk to Spanish AC, branded as "La Capital". It eventually rebranded to "La Mega Capital" and moved towards a more Spanish contemporary format.

== Translators ==
In addition to the main station, WTNT has two FM translators to widen its broadcast area.

Call sign	Frequency	City of license	FID	ERP (W)	HAAT	Class	FCC info
W225CN	92.9 FM	Centreville, Virginia	142765	25	77 m (253 ft)	D	LMS
W248BN	97.5 FM	Alexandria, Virginia	18863	250	213 m (699 ft)	D	LMS
