= WETA (FM) =

WETA and WGMS

WETA: Washington, D.C.; WGMS: Hagerstown, Maryland; United States
- Broadcast area: Washington metropolitan area
- Frequencies: WETA: 90.9 MHz (HD Radio); WGMS: 89.1 MHz (HD Radio)
- RDS: WETA: PI: 6126; PS: WETA; RT: WETA Classical 90.9
- Branding: WETA Classical 90.9 FM

Programming
- Language(s): English
- Format: Classical music
- Subchannels: HD2: Viva La Voce (classical vocal music); HD3: Virtuoso (classical music)

Ownership
- Owner: Greater Washington Educational Telecommunications Association
- Sister stations: WETA-TV

History
- First air date: WETA: March 15, 1970; WGMS: June 1993
- Former call signs: WETA: WETA-FM (1970–1994); WGMS: WETH (1993–2007)
- Call sign meaning: WETA: Washington Educational Telecommunications Association; WGMS: "Washington's Good Music Station"

Technical information
- Licensing authority: FCC
- Facility ID: WETA: 65669; WGMS: 25103
- Class: WETA: B; WGMS: B1
- ERP: WETA: 75,000 watts (analog); 3,200 watts (digital); WGMS: 900 (analog); 36 (digital)
- HAAT: WETA: 186 meters (610 ft); WGMS: 408 meters (1,339 ft)
- Transmitter coordinates: WETA: 38°53′30.4″N 77°7′53.9″W; WGMS: 39°41′47.3″N 77°30′49.0″W
- Translator(s): 88.9 W205BL (Frederick, Maryland)

Links
- Public license information: WETA: Public file; LMS; WGMS: Public file; LMS
- Webcast: Listen live
- Website: weta.org/fm

WETA (90.9 FM) is a non-commercial radio station licensed to Washington, D.C., United States, broadcasting a classical music format. Its studios, shared with primary PBS member WETA-TV (channel 26), are located inside the Sharon Percy Rockefeller Center for Public Media on Campbell Avenue in Arlington, Virginia, and its broadcast tower is located near Arlington at (38°53′30.0″N 77°7′54.0″W).

WETA is a grandfathered "superpower" station. The station covers the Washington metropolitan area with the highest analog effective radiated power (ERP) of any FM station in the market with 75,000 watts. This exceeds the maximum analog ERP limit allowed for a Class B FM station, and is also above the maximum allowable analog ERP for the station's antenna height above average terrain (HAAT) according to current Federal Communications Commission rules, which is 32,000 watts at 186 meters (610 ft).

WETA programming is simulcast on WGMS (89.1 FM) in Hagerstown, Maryland, and on translator W205BL 88.9 in Frederick, Maryland. WETA and WGMS broadcast using HD Radio.

== Past formats and format changes ==
From 1970 through early 2005, WETA featured a mixed radio format of classical music, folk music, jazz, and news. It switched to a predominantly news and talk radio format from February 28, 2005, until January 22, 2007, when it switched to its current all-classical radio format. The switch was part of an unusual deal between the public radio station and commercial station WGMS, which abandoned the classical music format it had aired for decades after an attempt to sell WGMS to Washington Commanders owner Dan Snyder failed. The Federal Communications Commission subsequently granted WETA permission to use the WGMS call letters for its repeater station in Hagerstown, Maryland, formerly known as WETH.

== Current format ==
WETA changed to a classical music format on January 22, 2007, at 8 pm. EST, with classical music now offered for more of the broadcast day than ever before in the station's history. Its current classical format is primarily mainstream orchestral, with a smattering of early and baroque music and chamber music. Aside from Saturday afternoon opera, very few vocal performances are aired on WETA.

As of April 2007, WETA reduced the number of hourly NPR newscasts, which had continued to be heard every hour since the change to the classical music format. Newscasts are now heard on the hour during drive time and at selected hours at other times. WETA also airs audio from the PBS NewsHour Monday through Friday evenings, for the benefit of area commuters unable to arrive home in time to view the program on television.

WETA airs opera programming on Saturday afternoons, including the Metropolitan Opera radio broadcasts during the Met's regular December–April broadcast season. They inherited from WGMS an all-vocal classical music format branded, "VivaLaVoce, the station that sings", on HD2.

WETA's only competition in the market area is WBJC (91.5 FM), also a non-commercial station, which broadcasts a classical music format and is licensed to serve Baltimore, Maryland.

== Other services ==
Since 1974, WETA has provided a subcarrier channel for the Metropolitan Washington Ear, a radio reading service for blind and visually impaired people. Listeners tune in to the service using special receivers provided free to qualifying individuals and can receive audio from more than 200 current publications, including newspapers, magazines, and books.

== Stations ==
One full-power station is licensed to simulcast the programming of WETA: WGMS (89.1 FM) in Hagerstown, Maryland.

=== Translators ===
WETA programming is broadcast on the following translator:

Call sign	Frequency	City of license	FID	ERP (W)	HAAT	Class	Transmitter coordinates	FCC info
W205BL	88.9 FM	Frederick, Maryland	90076	200	−16.2 m (−53 ft)	D	39°25′5.4″N 77°24′9.9″W	LMS
