= 1953 in radio =

The year 1953 saw a number of significant happenings in radio broadcasting history.

== Events ==
- 1 January – In Ireland Erskine Childers, the Minister for Posts and Telegraphs, appoints a new executive council, Comhairle Radio Éireann, to take over day-to-day responsibility for the state broadcasting service.
- 15 January – Harry Truman becomes the first President of the United States to broadcast his farewell address on radio and television.
- 19 March – For the first time the Academy Awards ceremony (broadcast annually on radio since 1930) is also carried on television.
- 3 May – German international broadcaster Deutsche Welle begins regular transmissions.
- 19 October – American CBS presenter Arthur Godfrey dismisses singer Julius La Rosa live on air on the radio-only segment of Godfrey's morning show.

== Debuts ==
- 1 January – Cathy and Elliott Lewis on Stage debuts on CBS.
- 7 January
  - The Crime Files of Flamond debuts on Mutual.
  - The Radio Church of God The World Tomorrow broadcast debuts in Europe on Radio Luxembourg.
- 15 January – Time for Love debuts on CBS.
- 8 June – Family Skeleton debuts on CBS.
- 5 July – Confession debuts on NBC.
- 21 July – The Baron and the Bee debuts on NBC.
- 20 September – The Six Shooter debuts on NBC.
- 23 October – House of Glass returns after an 18-year hiatus, this time on NBC.
- 3 November – To Be Perfectly Frank debuts on NBC.

== Closings ==
- (undated) – Bright Star ends its run in syndication by Ziv Company.
- 4 January - Good Will Hour ends its run on network radio (Mutual).
- 16 January – Your Hit Parade ends its run on network radio (NBC).
- 30 January – This Is Your FBI ends its run on network radio (ABC)
- 1 February – Hallmark Playhouse ends its run on network radio (CBS).
- 3 March – Life with Luigi ends its run on CBS.
- 31 March – Cavalcade of America (1935–1953) ends its run on NBC.
- 18 April – The Affairs of Peter Salem ends its run on network radio (Mutual).
- 19 April – The Aldrich Family ends its run on network radio (NBC).
- 5 June – Aunt Jemima ends its run on network radio (CBS).
- 28 June – The Chase ends its run on network radio (NBC).
- 19 July – Jason and the Golden Fleece ends its run on network radio (NBC).
- 27 July – The Bob Hawk Show ends its run on network radio (CBS).
- 5 September – Archie Andrews ends its run on network radio (NBC).
- 6 September – December Bride ends its run on network radio (CBS).
- 13 September – Confession ends its run on network radio (NBC).
- 20 September - Richard Diamond, Private Detective ends its run on network radio (CBS).
- 27 September – The First Nighter Program ends its run on network radio (NBC).
- 27 September – Best Plays ends its run on network radio (NBC).
- 19 November – Father Knows Best ends its run on network radio (NBC).

== Births ==
- 6 January – Paul Mayhew-Archer, English comedy writer and producer.
- 22 February – Geoffrey Perkins, English comedy producer (d. 2008).
- 3 October – Buzz Burbank, American newsman for the Don and Mike Show from 2 December 1991 and the Mike O'Meara Show
- 29 October – Lorelei King, American-born actress.
- Bob Cruz, American disc jockey on WABC from 1976 (d. 1995).

== Deaths ==
- 2 November - Homer Fickett, American radio director, producer, and writer (born 1897 or 1898)
- 9 November – Dylan Thomas, Welsh poet and radio broadcaster (b. 1914).
