= Mike Byster =

American mathematician

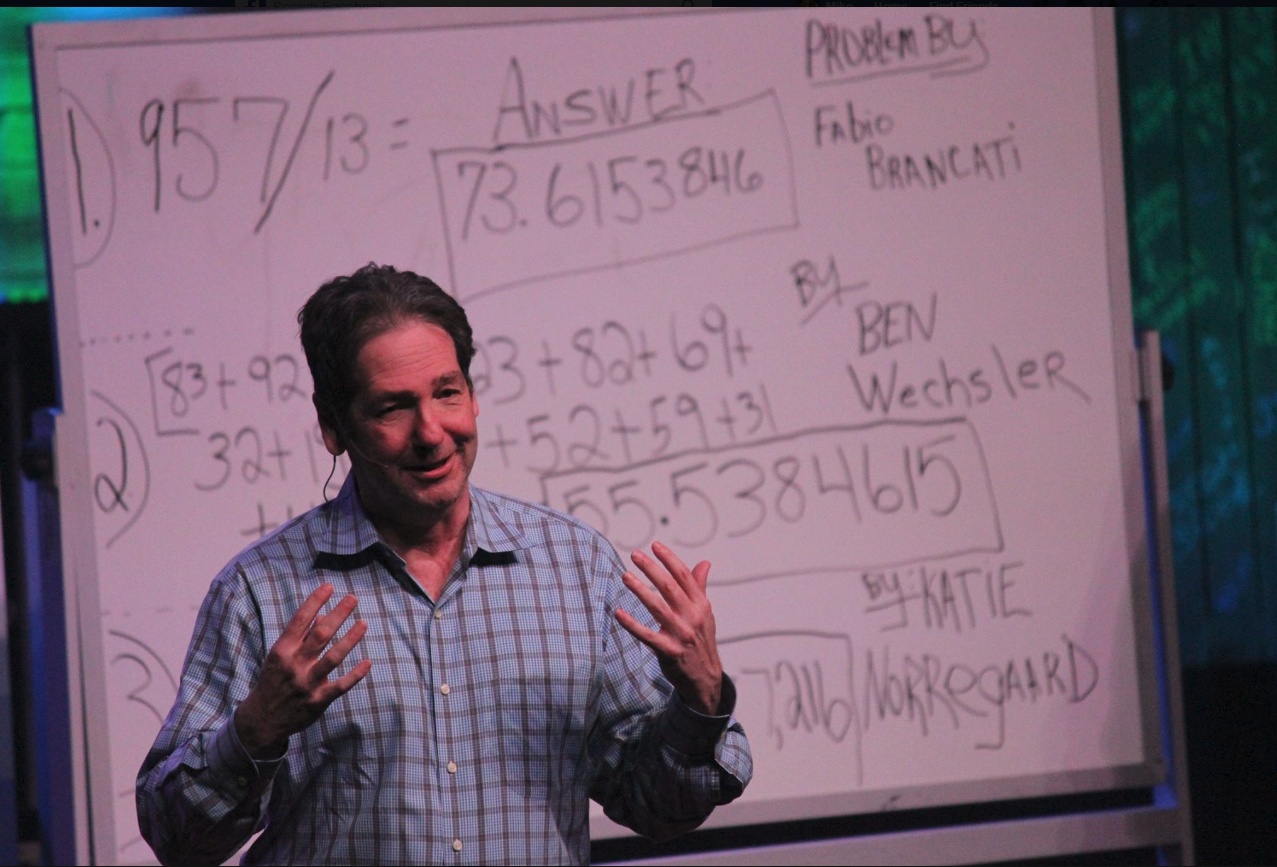
- Mike presenting during a TEDx conference
- Born: March 5, 1959 (age 67); Skokie, Illinois
- Known for: Mental math abilities
- Website: www.mikebyster.com

Michael Byster (born March 5, 1959) is an American mental calculator, and math educator. He worked in the financial field until he quit his job to devote himself to teaching children his methods. He has spoken to over 10,000 classrooms for free and continues to mentor children. Byster is able to do many arithmetic problems in his head at very fast speeds. During a study done years ago, Byster was claimed to have one of the fastest mathematical minds in the world.

== Biography ==
=== Early life ===
Byster was raised along with his older sister in the Chicago suburb of Skokie, Illinois. His parents Gloria and Dave encouraged his math shortcuts at a young age. He went to Niles North High School and then attended University of Illinois at Urbana–Champaign, graduating with a bachelor's degree in finance in 1981.

=== Career ===
Byster worked at the Chicago Mercantile Exchange, but after his cousin, a math teacher in a Chicago area high school, invited him to show the class his shortcuts for doing base 10 arithmetic, Byster quit his job to devote himself to teaching children his methods. After that, he continued to do shows for free to schools across the United States. In December 2003, he released the website Mike's Math, but this was discontinued in 2007. In 2008, Byster produced the Brainetics math and memory system. Byster claims that Brainetics uses both sides of the brain to process and store information, allowing anyone to recall the information at a fast pace.

=== Media appearances ===
Byster appeared on ABC's 20/20 in 2007. From 2007 onwards, he has appeared on multiple television and radio shows. On January 21, 2010, Mike appeared on Oprah Radio's The Gayle King Show. Mike has appeared on The Shopping Channel in Canada and QVC in the United States multiple times. He appeared on Fox News June 8, 2011. He has also appeared on WGN in July 2011, Good Day New York in August 2011 and then Fox News Boston on October 27, 2011. He was on WBEZ's Afternoon Shift on September 27, 2013. In November 2016, Byster gave a TEDx talk titled "How to Think Like a Genius". On June 26, 2017, Byster competed on the FOX TV competition series Superhuman. Byster won that week's competition and with that received $50,000 and the title of "Superhuman". He is a monthly guest on WOCM's The Rude Awakening Show.

=== Personal life ===
Byster got married in the early 1990s and has a son, Josh, to whom he has taught his methods. He currently resides in the northern suburbs of Chicago.
