= Mike Elston =

Mike Elston may refer to:

- Buzz Burbank, media personality whose real name is Mike Elston (born 1953)
- Michael Elston (born 1969), United States lawyer and appointee to the Department of Justice during the administration of George W. Bush
- Mike Elston (American football coach)
