= Vintage Blue =

American indie rock band

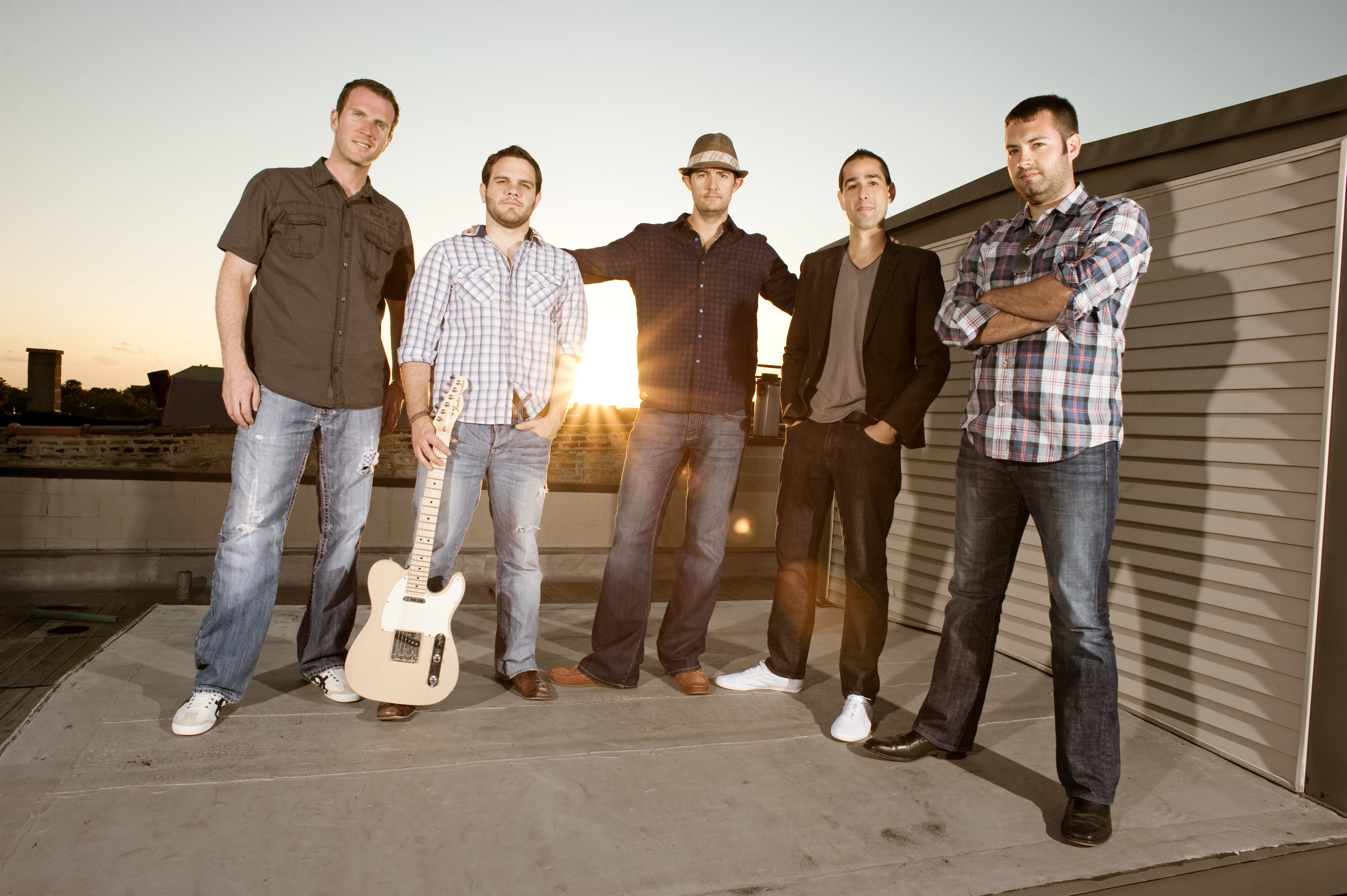
- From left to right: Will Crowden, Benjamin Bassett, Ryan Tibbs, Cesar Corral and Matt Zimmerman.

Background information
- Origin: Chicago, Illinois, U.S.
- Genres: Rock
- Years active: 2011–present
- Members: Will Crowden; Ryan Tibbs; Benjamin Bassett; Cesar Corral; Matt Zimmerman; Brent Shumard
- Website: www.vintagebluemusic.com

Vintage Blue is an American indie rock band from Chicago, Illinois. Their music has been described as "intensely likeable" as well as being "driven and full of flavor." Vintage Blue was recently called "One of the best unsigned bands in the country" by the Rock and Roll Report. The band describes its sound as adding umph to contemporary indie tunes with deft, driving, rock soul, and has drawn comparisons ranging from The Killers all the way to the Eagles and Led Zeppelin.

The band is currently composed of Ryan Tibbs (lead vocals/guitar), Will Crowden (drums/percussion), Cesar Corral (bass), Brent Shumard (saxophonist, percussion, synth) Matt Zimmerman (saxophonist, keyboards, synth) and Benjamin Bassett (lead guitar/lead vocals). Will Crowden is the grandson of the founder and former owner of Ludwig-Musser Drum Company.

== History ==
=== Pre-Vintage Blue (2007–2010) ===
Bassett, Crowden and Tibbs originally played together as Tanglewood from 2007 to 2010, which included Seth Howard (lead vocals/guitar) and featured Bassett on bass guitar and keyboard. Corral and Zimmerman were added to the band in February 2008, with Bassett moving to rhythm guitar. Howard left the band in late 2009.

From 2008 to 2010 Tanglewood frequented several music venues around Chicago including Wise Fools Pub and Cubby Bear. The band also played several notable summer festivals in Chicago in 2011 including Ribfest Chicago, Taste of River North and Party at St. Mike's.

=== Becoming Vintage Blue (2011) ===
While writing and recording demos for their debut record, the band was introduced to then executive of Rock Ridge Music, and now owner/founder of JLS Artist Management and Noble Steed Music, Jason Spiewak. Spiewak began working with the band, starting by suggesting they find a new moniker to rebrand and optimize marketability. In one week, the band decided on Vintage Blue. They enlisted the help of local Chicago artist Justin Nottke to design a new logo and album cover and created a new image and website shortly thereafter.

=== Vintage Blue (2011–2014) ===
Since creating Vintage Blue in late 2011, the band has appeared with Fitz and the Tantrums, Third Eye Blind, Lifehouse, Edward Sharpe & The Magnetic Zeroes, The Mowglis, Rusted Root, ZZ Ward, Saints of Valory, JC Brooks & the Uptown Sound, Punch Brothers, Brett Dennen, Local H, John Waite, Vertical Horizon, 10,000 Maniacs, Cowboy Mouth, Company of Thieves, Lovehammers, Hey Monea!, 56 Hope Road, Mr. Blotto, Deadbeat Darling, 7th Heaven, Archie Powell & The Exports, Carbon Leaf, Gaelic Storm and most notably, several appearances with Sister Hazel in 2011 and 2012 and a VIP appearance for Dave Matthews Band.

Vintage Blue has played many of the notable clubs around Chicago, including The House of Blues Chicago (8x), Metro (2x), Lincoln Hall, Double Door (4x), Cubby Bear, Abbey Pub, Subterranean, Empty Bottle, Schubas, Tonic Room, and the Elbo Room. The band has also found a home in the competitive Chicago Festival circuit playing The Taste of Chicago (2013), World's Largest Block Party (2012, 2013, 2014), Sheffield Garden Walk (2012, 2013), Roscoe Village Burger Fest (2013), The Boulevard Bash (2012), The Guinness Oysterfest (2012), Long Grove's Chocolate, Strawberry and Apple Festivals (2013), St. Norbert Block Party (2013), and Des Plaines Fall Festival in September 2013.

The band also began touring in the Midwest, and in late 2012 on the Blue September National Tour. As of July 2014, the band had played in cities from Los Angeles all the way to Ocean City Maryland, and everywhere in between.

=== Strike the Mics – 2012 (LP) ===
Strike the Mics is a 13-track LP that Vintage Blue independently released on February 14, 2012. The band enlisted producer Jamie Candiloro (R.E.M., Ryan Adams, Red Wanting Blue) to guide the debut album. The album was recorded in Chicago, Illinois at Rax Trax Studios over the course of several weeks. The album was engineered, produced and mixed by Candiloro, and then mastered at Marcussen Studios by Stephen Marcussen. Based on pre-sales alone, the record would have cracked the Billboard Heatseekers 100, and sold over 1000 copies after only a couple of months. Vintage Blue held a CD Release Party on January 21, 2012, at Subterranean in Chicago. The show was sold out and featured artists Elisa Grace and Ty Stone.

Press around the country responded well to the album, saying: [Strike the Mics was] "the kind of thing that should please both fans of modern rock and those whose tastes run more towards classic sounds," "Vintage Blue has created an album in Strike The Mics that will please even the most fickle of rock fans," and that "The new album finds the band tighter, leaner and more focused on contributing to the Great American Songbook than ever before."

Additionally, Vintage Blue was featured on WXRT's show Local Anesthetic on April 8, 2012. The band also was added to the rotation of AAA radio station 98.1 WOCM, Ocean City, Maryland and to over 150 College and Community Radio Stations in North America, including: WMHW, KLCZ, WLCA, WMUH, WRSU, KDHX, WRDP, KFAI, WIIT, and WMXM. The most significant online exposure piece came as the band was featured on Windows Media Guide.

=== No Going Back – 2014 (EP) ===
No Going Back is a six-song EP that Vintage Blue released on April 29, 2014. The first single from the record, "Alone (I Can Hear)", charted in the top 200 of AAA radio, being played nationwide on that radio format. After writing new songs since the release of Strike the Mics, the band returned to the doorstep of producer Jamie Candiloro (R.E.M., Ryan Adams, Red Wanting Blue) to again man the ship on this album. The release show for the record was held at Chicago's beloved Metro and was presented by 101 WKQX, Chicago's local Alternative Station.

The EP also spawned Vintage Blue's first official music video. The video features a beautiful female protagonist traveling through familiar windy city neighborhoods that magically transform from moody black and white to full color. The visual effects (color and B&W often occupy the same frame) are stellar and the video smartly incorporates images (the face of a clock, hands moving forward; a mural being painted) that speak directly to the song's overriding themes.

== National and international appearances ==
Vintage Blue garnered a national audience when they appeared on WGN America's nationally televised "Midday News" on March 8, 2012. Vintage Blue was also invited to open for ZZ Ward and Saints of Valory at Milwaukee's Summerfest on June 27, 2014 as a follow up to their appearance with Fitz and the Tantrums at Summerfest on July 6, 2012. They were also invited to be a part of the Summer Camp Music Festival: On the Road Series at High Noon Saloon in Madison, WI on March 1, 2013. The band has also played private events overseas, with their most recent appearance in the Guanacaste region of Costa Rica in December 2012.
