= Mr. Man =

Mr. Man may refer to:

- Mr. Man (website), a pornographic website
- Any one of the Mr. Men, characters in a series of children's books
- A character in Boohbah, a children's TV programme

== See also ==
- Mr. Mann, a character in Little Britain
