= Mr. Skin =

Website

- Website type: Internet pornography
- Available in: English
- Creator: Jim McBride
- Website: Official website
- Registration: Optional (previews only)
- Launched: August 10, 1999; 27 years ago
- Current status: Active

Mr. Skin is a website that specializes in locating, posting, and rating instances of female nudity in television and film. Founded in August 1999, Mr. Skin is also the nickname of the company's chief executive, Jim McBride. MrSkin.com attracted more than seven million visitors per month in 2007, going up to over ten million in 2014. As of 2017, the site has more than nine million visitors per month.

== History ==
In 1997, Jim McBride took his hobby of memorizing what movie actresses had performed nude scenes in Hollywood movies onto the radio. He was featured as a radio show personality "Mr. Skin" on Harry Teinowitz's WMVP/Chicago call in radio show.

In 1999 Jim McBride met with an attorney to map out a legal strategy for creating a website featuring nude video clips of famous Hollywood stars taken from movie scenes. The Mr. Skin website was created as an editorial site featuring complete biographies, reviews and news about movie celebrities, along with clips from their movies. The most popular scenes that drove web traffic happened to be the clips featuring partial or full nudity from the actresses' movie.

After an appearance on The Howard Stern Show in 2000, McBride became a regular guest, ultimately producing a "Mr. Skin Minute" that continues to air every Thursday as part of Stern's Sirius Satellite Radio program, airing every other Wednesday at 9:40 am on The Rude Awakening Show on WOCM. Other radio shows that have featured Mr. Skin include Lex and Terry, Tom Leykis, The Adam Carolla Show, Loveline, Steve Dahl, Opie and Anthony, Kidd Chris, The Bob & Tom Show, Drew & Mike, The Drew and Mike Podcast The World Famous Frank Show, The Todd and Tyler Radio Empire, The Regular Guys, The Jeff O'Neil Show, The Free Beer and Hot Wings Show, The Toucher and Rich Show, Preston & Steve, The Don and Mike Show and a weekly call in to the BS on Real Radio 104.1 in Orlando, Florida and every Monday on The Paul Castronovo show. He also appeared numerous times on The Drew and Mike Show on WRIF radio in Detroit, and every Thursday on The Playboy Morning Show TV and Web Audio and video Streaming on Playboy TV.

In 2002, he appeared on the comedy game show Beat the Geeks as the Nudity In Movies geek for 2 episodes.

In 2007, MrSkin.com was referenced in Judd Apatow's comedy, Knocked Up, which was discussed in a New York Times Business section feature which detailed MrSkin.com's history and its prominence in Knocked Up.

In 2017, Jim McBride along with the team from 'Naked News' were guests on the reality show 'Below Deck Mediterranean' to celebrate the 17th Anniversary of Mr. Skin.

In 2020, Jim McBride produced and appeared in Skin: A History of Nudity in the Movies, a documentary on the history of nudity in feature films from the early silent days to the present.

== Spin-offs ==
In October 2013, McBride introduced the spin-off site Mr. Man, devoted solely to male nudity.

In March 2015 Mr. Skin confirmed his collaboration with Fangoria Magazine, for the column Flesh and Blood.

== Books ==
St. Martin's Press published the nudity guidebook Mr. Skin's Skincyclopedia: The A to Z Guide to Finding Your Favorite Actresses Naked in 2005.

Mr. Skin's Skintastic Video Guide: The 501 Greatest Movies for Sex and Nudity on DVD was published in the fall of 2007.

Being Mr. Skin: 20 Years of Nip Slips, Cheek Peeks, and Fast-Forwarding to the Good Parts was published in May 2019.
