= Rude Awakening =

Rude Awakening may refer to:

== Film and television ==
- Pochardiana ou le Rêveur éveillé, (Rude Awakening in English), (1908) a film directed by Georges Méliès
- Rude Awakening (1975), a short film directed by Warren Sonbert
- "Rude Awakening" (1980), an episode in the Hammer House of Horror TV series
- Rude Awakening (film) (1989), a film directed by David Greenwalt and Aaron Russo
- Rude Awakening (TV series) an American TV series from 1998 – 2001
- Rude Awakenings, a New Zealand TV series from 2007

== Music ==
- Rude Awakening (Andy Irvine album), a 1991 album by Irish folk musician Andy Irvine
- Rude Awakening (Prong album), a 1996 album by American metal band Prong
- Rude Awakening (Megadeth album), a 2002 live album by American heavy metal band Megadeth
- "Rude Awakening #2", a song by Creedence Clearwater Revival on the album Pendulum
- "Rude Awakening", a song by AG on his album The Dirty Version
- "Rude Awakening", a song by Status Quo on their album Thirsty Work
- "Rude Awakening", a song by Michael Schenker Group on their album The Unforgiven
- Rude Awakening, a 1990 debut album for The Rude Boys

== Other ==
- Rude Awakening, a gallery show by John S. Boskovich inspired by the band Rude Awakening
- Forbidden Broadway: Rude Awakening, a 2007 off-Broadway revue
- The Rude Awakening, a 1998 album by the Cocoa Brovaz
- The Rude Awakening Show, a radio show
- They Hunger 3: Rude Awakening, a video game
- The Rude Awakening, a wrestling move performed by Rick Rude
