= Fleshbot =

Sex-oriented weblog

- Founded: November 10, 2003; 23 years ago
- Area served: Worldwide
- Products: Blog; awards
- Parent: Gawker Media (2003–2011); Lux Alptraum (2012–2013); SK Intertainment (2014–2020); NSFW.Army (2021–present)
- Website: fleshbot.com

Fleshbot is an American sex-oriented blog and online publication that covers the adult entertainment industry, erotica, and sex in popular culture. Launched on November 10, 2003, by Nick Denton as part of the Gawker Media network, it was the third title established by the company following Gizmodo and Gawker. The site gained early prominence for its coverage of celebrity sex tapes and its editorial approach. Fleshbot is also noted for its non-segregated coverage of both heterosexual and homosexual media.

Over its history, the publication has undergone several changes in ownership. In 2012, it was divested from Gawker Media and acquired by its then-editor-in-chief, Lux Alptraum. It was subsequently purchased in 2014 by SK Intertainment, and later by NSFW.Army in 2021. Beyond its news and curation services, the site is well known for hosting the annual Fleshbot Awards, a ceremony that recognizes performers and creators across various sectors of the adult industry.

== History ==
=== 2003–2004: Beginning with Gawker Media ===
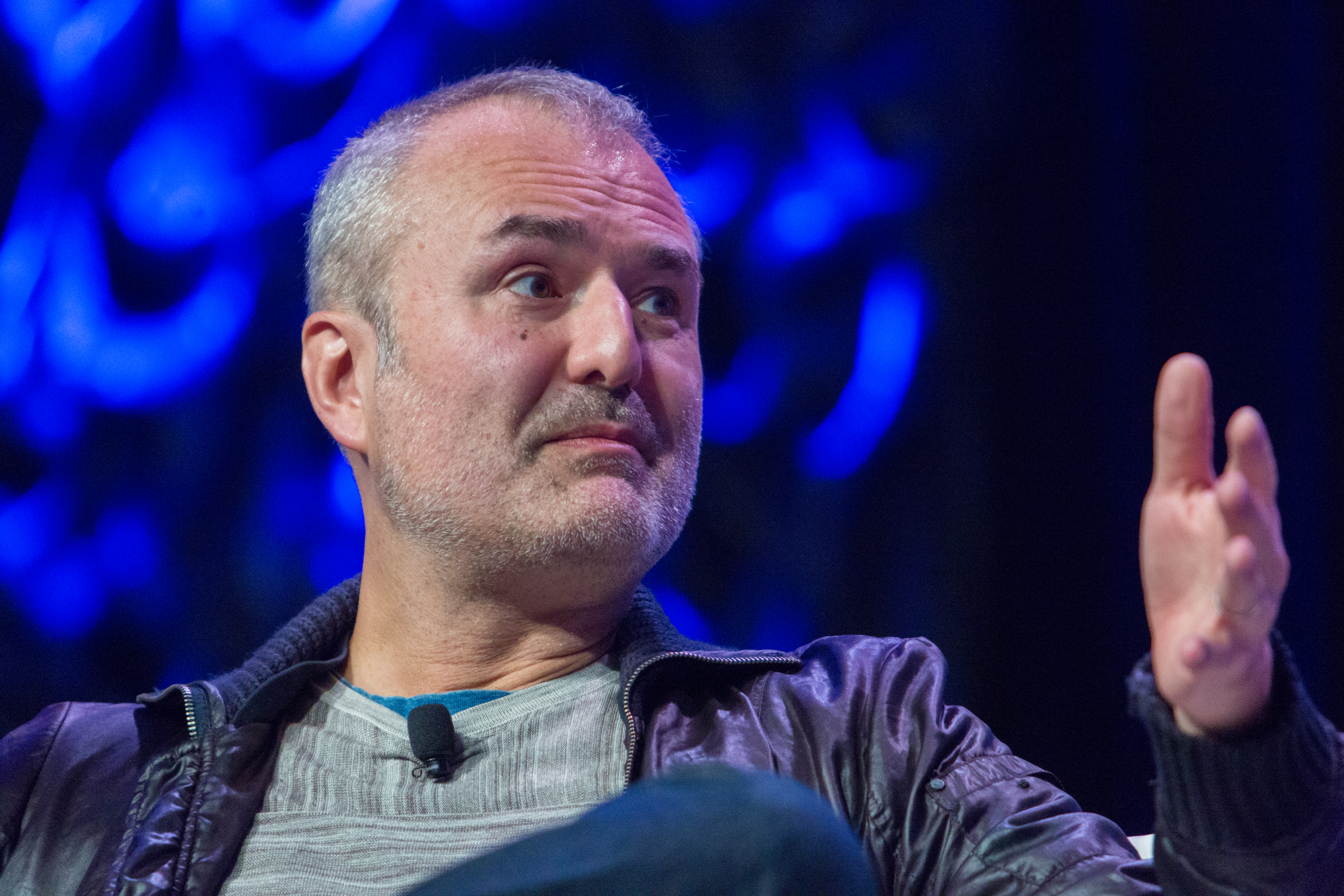
Nick Denton (pictured in 2017) founded Fleshbot as part of his blog network Gawker Media.

Gawker Media's president, Nick Denton, originally came up with the idea for Fleshbot because he wanted a place where he could easily find his pornography of choice, and aimed to feature explicit pornography rather than "airbrushed erotica". He wanted the content to be provocative enough for online discussion, with a tone that was both witty and intelligent, without being overly serious. "The idea was to take some of the new stuff that's emerging online and bring that up to readers in a way that was intelligent and professional," he stated. Denton's content strategy focused on three criteria: the availability of material to link to, reader interest, and advertising potential. He concluded that pornography clearly satisfied all three requirements.

The venture kept investment costs low by utilizing cheap software and curated content while leveraging free viral marketing for growth. Jonno d'Addario was employed as the sole editor and provided a restricted salary of $2,500 per month while working remotely from New Orleans. He was eligible for bonuses if he managed to generate significant spikes in traffic. His role involved actively scanning the web for the best tidbits and compiling annotated links, a task supplemented by tips received from both readers and published authors. Financially, the blog depended almost exclusively on advertising online, targeting specific keywords on Google's search engine, while relying on Google AdSense to generate the bulk of its revenue.

Launched on November 10, 2003, Fleshbot served as the third mainstream weblog under the Gawker Media umbrella, after the establishment of Gawker and Gizmodo. During its launch week, the blog gained attention for posting stills and free links to Paris Hilton's sex tape. The site claimed it was the first publication to release both the still images and the video online. Denton said that he had received one of the first copies of the tape via email from an anonymous source. The high volume of traffic caused the server to crash. The site attracted 170,000 page views on its first day and quickly soared to over one million by the end of its first week, surpassing Gawker in traffic.

=== 2005–2009: Continued popularity and controversies ===
By 2005, Fleshbot was one of the most popular adult-oriented blogs, and the most popular site in the Gawker Media network, attracting nearly two million unique visitors per month. A Comscore study ranked the site among the most-visited blogs of the year's first quarter, based on the digital footprints of over two million users. Daily traffic quadrupled from 75,000 unique views in 2005 to 300,000 the following year. This growth occurred despite a lack of inbound links, as most readers preferred not to link to the site publicly. Following Google AdSense's exit from the adult sector, the site transitioned to alternative vendors like MarketBanker. Despite the move, its $125 weekly text ads remained sold out since launch. D'Addario credited this consistent demand to a combination of organic word-of-mouth and steadily rising traffic.

In 2004, Denton launched Fleshbot Films, a label dedicated to erotica. D'Addario emphasized that the label aimed to distribute content that "people aren't accustomed to seeing in the world of adult film." Its debut release was a fully-restored version of Ed Wood's final film, Necromania (1971). That July, Fleshbot published a link to a site featuring a topless Cameron Diaz in a 1992 film. D'Addario denied any liability, noting that Fleshbot did not host or sell the content directly. The Los Angeles Superior Court banned the distribution of the footage and issued a cease-and-desist letter to the site's owners. In August 2009, Gawker published edited segments of a 12-minute home video featuring Eric Dane naked with his wife Rebecca Gayheart and Kari Ann Peniche. Despite containing no actual sex acts, an uncensored version of the video drove over 1.2 million views on Fleshbot by the end of the year. The couple responded with a $1 million lawsuit for copyright infringement, demanding the video's immediate removal. Gawker Media ultimately complied, pulling the clip and settling the dispute through private mediation in 2010. The following year, the site published stolen nude photographs of actress Scarlett Johansson obtained via a mobile phone hack. Following immediate legal threats, Gawker Media removed the images from the site.

Gawker Media began using the payroll service ADP in 2009 to handle its human resources duties. Because ADP's guidelines forbid partnering with pornographic sites, they refused to process paychecks for Fleshbot staff. To solve this, Denton split Fleshbot into a separate limited liability company, took personal ownership of the site, and, for at least the first few months, paid the staffers' salaries himself using his own handwritten checks. While legally structured as a separate entity to appease hesitant advertisers, Fleshbot remained functionally integrated with Gawker, sharing the same office, technical staff, and payroll. This arrangement forced Gawker employees to operate the adult site against their will, leading to significant internal conflict. Gawker Media also removed Fleshbot from its public roster of properties.

=== 2010–2013: Decline and acquired by Lux Alptraum ===
In 2010, Fleshbot was among the properties compromised in a security breach targeting Gawker Media. A group of hackers exposed over 1 million usernames, emails, and passwords, along with Gawker's source code and private internal staff conversations. The stolen data was leaked as a 500 MB file on a public file-sharing site. That year, Fleshbot became the company's worst-performing site for attracting new readers, with domestic traffic dropping to approximately one million unique monthly visitors.

In early 2011, Fleshbot and its sister sites debuted a year-long redesign that British author Felix Salmon heralded as "the biggest event in Gawker Media history". For the first time in years, the platform reintroduced outbound links to its home pages. In November, editor Lux Alptraum announced that Fleshbot was for sale and no longer part of the Gawker network. She explained that the split was driven by the hesitation of advertisers and banks to be associated with adult content, and the parent company's "sales strategy and technology platform have ceased to effectively support Fleshbot's needs". Denton admitted the site had been a brand outlier for years and he held onto the property because "[he was] slow to realize the inevitable". By the time it hit the market, Fleshbot was generating 25 million monthly page views, roughly 5 percent of Gawker Media's total audience. Gawker eventually posted uncensored celebrity sex videos, taking over Fleshbot role within the Gawker Media network.

Following a two-month search for a buyer, Alptraum acquired Fleshbot and assumed the role of CEO in February 2012. She revealed that the short sales timeline had prevented other interested parties from finalizing bids in time, ultimately facilitating her purchase of the property. Alptraum previously joined Gawker in 2007 and was named editor-in-chief of Fleshbot in October 2008. During her tenure at Gawker, Alptraum noted that Fleshbot was unable to reach its full potential due to the constraints of the platform's layout and a restrictive advertising strategy. She believed that transitioning away from Gawker Media would grant the site the freedom it needed to flourish. During the acquisition, journalists examined Fleshbot's profitability. Salmon suggested that advertising revenue for adult platforms like Fleshbot had sharply declined. He attributed this struggle to strong competition from Gawker itself and the adult-content community on Tumblr. Peter Kafka of All Things Digital noted that the site's explicit content limited its commercial potential, while Ben McGrath of The New Yorker wrote that the site was "a drag on the reputable kind of advertising that Denton now covets".

In 2013, Fleshbot underwent another redesign focused on a more cohesive user experience and advanced monetization. The site migrated from Gawker Media's custom publishing software to WordPress, enabling the use of standardized advertising formats tailored for the adult industry. Alptraum expanded the brand with the launch of Fleshbot Fiction, an erotica imprint specifically curated for women. The venture focused on high-quality stories, leveraging the e-book format to offer single titles at a low price point. Under the ownership of Gawker Media, Fleshbot previously maintained a legal stance that it was not required to comply with Child Protection and Obscenity Enforcement Act, a federal law regarding record-keeping and labeling for adult content. However, after Alptraum's acquisition, the publication reversed this position and brought its operations into full legal compliance.

In May, Denton filed papers in the New York Supreme Court, alleging that Alptraum had failed to pay the purchase price for Fleshbot. According to the filing, Alptraum had signed a promissory note for $100,000, to be paid in four installments of $25,000; Denton claimed none of these payments were ever made. Alptraum countered with accusations of breach of contract and fraud, alleging that Denton had reneged on his promise to transfer the site's URLs and domain codes. In an interview, Denton characterized the site as a "poison pill", admitting it had become more trouble than it was worth.

=== 2014–present: Further acquisitions ===
In February 2014, Fleshbot was acquired by SK Intertainment, the company behind adult sites such as Mr. Skin, Mr. Man, and Naked News. This acquisition led to another revamp of the website's design and content. SK Intertainment hosted and managed all technical and editorial aspects of the site in-house. Alptraum transitioned from her leadership role to serve as a contributing editor for Fleshbot.

In May 2021, Fleshbot was acquired by NSFW.Army, marking the first in a planned series of acquisitions by the company. As part of this transition, the site received a complete redesign. Two years later, the company expanded its portfolio by acquiring XCritic, an adult movie review and news platform. The company merged XCritic with Fleshbot, where XCritic writers continue to produce new reviews alongside monthly "XCritic Pick" and "XCritic Pick International" features for the straight and gay markets. Simultaneously, NSFW.Army integrated Cybersocket, an LGBT-related publication acquired in June 2021, and its staff with Gay Fleshbot to form a "mega-hub". This consolidated publication began hosting major industry events, such as its month-long "Fetish Month" celebration in January 2023.

== Content ==
Fleshbot initially featured no original content, consisting instead of thumbnails, annotated links to material on external sites, and receiving up to a dozen updates per day. The site subsequently expanded its scope to include coverage of adult entertainment and popular culture. The blog features reviews of adult toys and DVDs, as well as technophile-targeted sections, such as the "Morph" and "CGI" sections. Alptraum summarized the core Fleshbot content formula as a blend of "sex + tech and sex + D-list celebrities", heavily supplemented by crossposting. Dalton Labarge of The Eye noted that the writers offered "biting insight into the domains of both professional and amateur styles of pornography". Following the SK Entertainment acquisition in 2014, Fleshbot expanded its high-profile industry interviews and specialized weekly columns.

Unlike other adult outlets that segregate content by sexual orientation, Fleshbot covers both straight and gay pornography. Quentin Boyer of Pink Visual noted that this approach marks a significant departure from the industry standard, while AVN praised the site's non-segregated model as "truly comprehensive". In their review of Gay Fleshbot, Xtra Magazine described the site as a useful guide to male fantasies, calling it a "hilarious and joyful romp through healthy gay perversions." Tracy Clark-Flory of Salon.com found the site "a decidedly Internet-era mindset of plurality and pansexuality". In contrast, Salmon criticized this unified model, arguing that the site ignored how people actually consume adult media, as porn consumption is driven by personal kinks. An author from Feministing argued that by labeling all male-centric material as gay, Fleshbot prioritized the male gaze and marginalized female audiences.

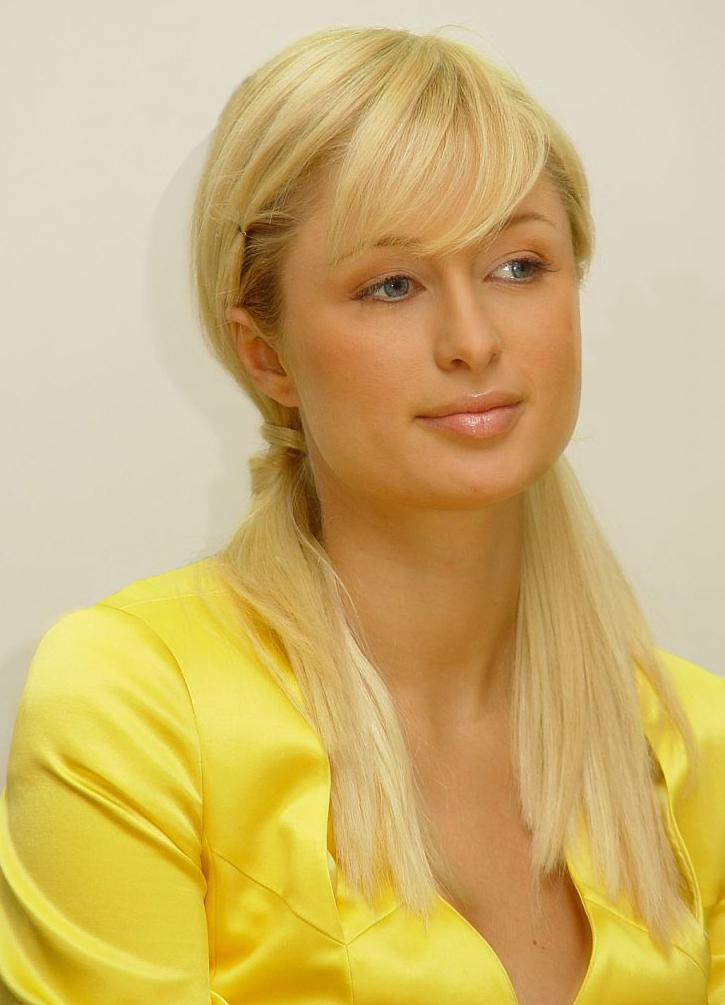
Fleshbot's coverage of Paris Hilton (pictured in 2005) during its launch phase became one of Gawker Media's earliest viral successes.

In line with other Gawker Media properties, the site's coverage of celebrity leaks drew criticism for being a blatant breach of privacy and security. Journalists noted that its launch coincided aptly with the rise of adult content in mainstream media. The Hilton sex tape is cited as one of Gawker Media's first major hits. Slate's Amanda Hess and writer Jim Rutenberg argued that the launch successfully established the company as a key player in web publishing. Rutenberg felt the decision to post the tape fit the company's style of criticizing celebrity arrogance, echoing the satirical tradition of Spy magazine.

Despite its explicit content, the site's editorial style earned widespread praise from conventional publications. The Village Voice's Brendan I. Koerner referred to the site as "the perfect way to conceal your animal urges beneath a veneer of geek intellectualism". Writing for The New York Times, American writer Andrew Ross Sorkin described Fleshbot as "erudite pornography", while Tom Zeller Jr. dubbed it "the thinking person's diary of smut". Sex writer Susannah Breslin described Addario's approach as "smart, sexy, and snarky", arguing that Fleshbot reached a unique demographic of intelligent hipsters. To Breslin, the blog represented the future of the industry by making the consumption of adult content feel "cool instead of trashy". Wired echoed this sentiment, noting that the publication carved out a niche as a digital publication for fans of both pornography and technology. The magazine praised the site for blending "irony with onanism", while avoiding the highbrow feel of competitors like Nerve.com.

By the 2010s, Fleshbot had established itself as one of the most widely recognized erotica blogs. Salmon argued that Fleshbot ultimately failed to live up to Denton's innovative vision held at its 2003 launch, as it increasingly functioned more as a "mouthpiece for, and captured by, the porn industry". American journalist Ben Smith characterized the site as the tangible realization of Denton's philosophy: a deliberate rejection of the "hypocrisy" found in traditional journalism and catering to human desires to drive traffic.

== Awards and nominations ==
Year	Award	Category	Result	Ref.
2016	AltPorn Award	Best Free AltPorn Site (that isn't AltPorn.net)	Nominated	
2017	AltPorn Award	Best Free AltPorn Site (that isn't AltPorn.net)	Won	
2018	AltPorn Award	Best Free AltPorn Site (that isn't AltPorn.net)	Nominated	
2019	AltPorn Award	Best Free AltPorn Site (that isn't AltPorn.net)	Won	
2020	AltPorn Award	Best Free AltPorn Site (that isn't AltPorn.net)	Nominated	
2021	AltPorn Award	Best Free AltPorn Site (that isn't AltPorn.net)	Nominated	
2016	AVN Award	Best Alternative Website	Nominated	
2011	Cybersocket Web Award	Best Porn Blog (for Gay Fleshbot)	Nominated	
2016	Cybersocket Web Award	Best Porn Review Site (for Gay Fleshbot)	Nominated	
2019	Cybersocket Web Award	Best Blog or Porn Review Site (for Gay Fleshbot)	Won	
2012	Grabby Award	Best Porn Blog	Nominated	
2012	XBIZ Award	Adult Site of the Year – Portal/Hub	Nominated	
2013	XBIZ Award	Fan Portal of the Year	Nominated	
2014	XBIZ Award	Fan Site of the Year	Nominated	
2015	XBIZ Award	Adult Site of the Year – Fan Site	Nominated	
2016	XBIZ Award	Adult Site of the Year – Fan Site	Nominated	
2017	XBIZ Award	Adult Site of the Year – Fan Site	Nominated	
2018	XBIZ Award	Fan Site of the Year	Nominated	
2019	XBIZ Award	Fan Site of the Year	Nominated	

== Fleshbot Awards ==
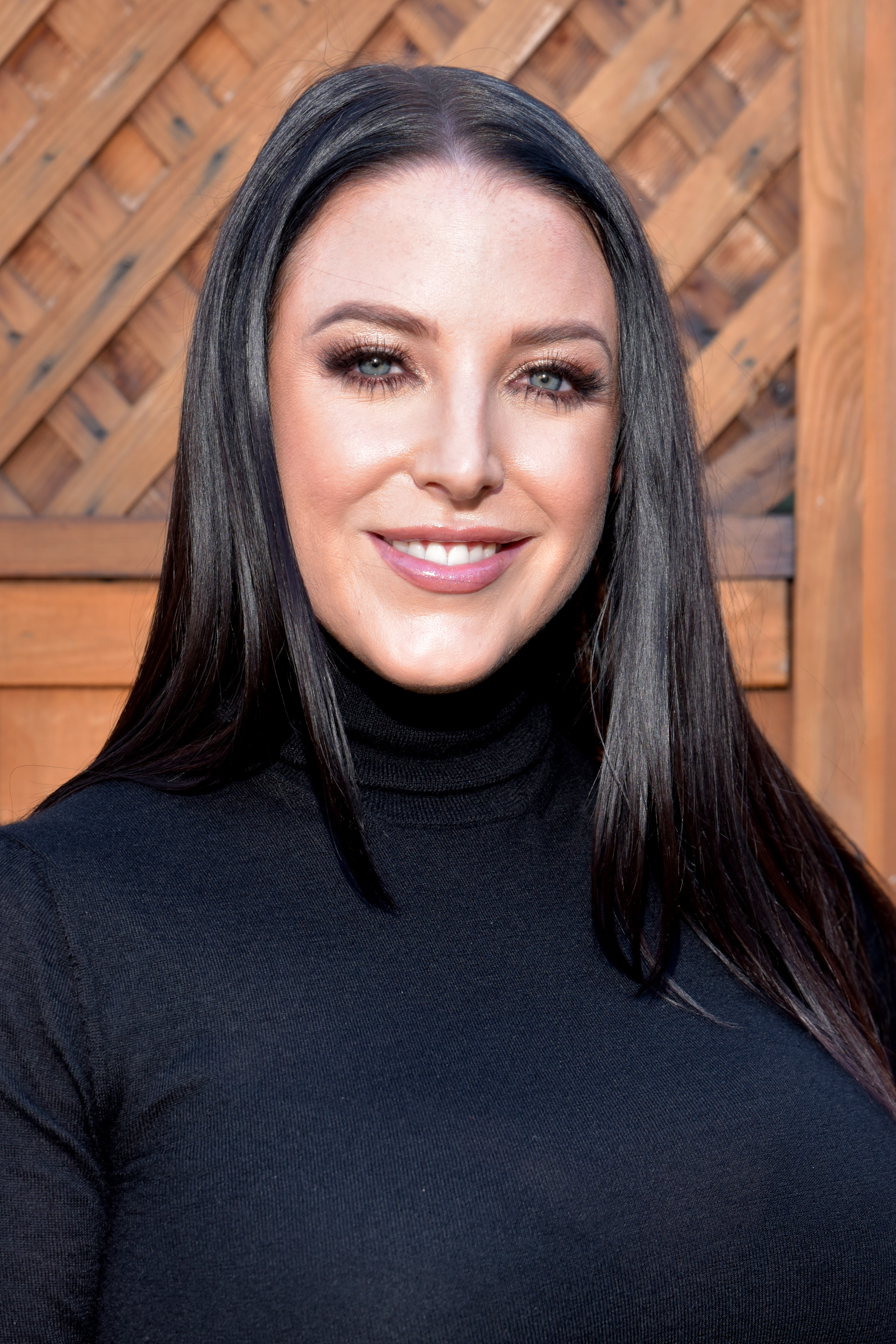
Angela White (pictured in 2019), four-time winner of the Female Performer of the Year award

In November 2009, the Fleshbot Awards were launched to recognize achievements in sexuality across television, fashion, art, and technology. The inaugural ceremony, hosted by Justin Bond and John Cameron Mitchell at the New York burlesque club The Box, provided a significant traffic boost for the blog. A highlight of the first event was honoring Levi Johnston, former fiancé of Bristol Palin, for the "Mainstream to Porn Crossover Award" following his semi-nude pictorial in Playgirl. In 2011, the award was given to professional wrestler Chyna, who made her first professional film with Vivid Video.

The Fleshbot Awards underwent a significant revamp in 2018, transitioning to a fully fan-voted format. This shift generated more than 600,000 votes cast by fans in May for their favorite performers and creators. The LGBT-related categories were presented separately by Mr. Man, as FleshbotGay Awards. It was renamed as Gay Fleshbot Awards in 2019, presented by Flirt4Free. These LGBT-related categories were merged to the Fleshbot Awards in 2020. Most recently, the 2023 award season merged with the annual XCritic Awards.

=== Notable categories ===
==== Female Performer of the Year ====
- 2009: Joanna Angel (as Fan Choice Awards – Sexiest Female)
- 2018: Riley Reid
- 2019: Angela White
- 2020: Angela White
- 2021: Angela White
- 2022: Angela White
- 2023: Violet Myers

==== Male Performer of the Year ====
- 2009: Marco Blaze (as Fan Choice Awards – Sexiest Male)
- 2018: Johnny Sins
- 2019: Manuel Ferrara
- 2020: Manuel Ferrara
- 2021: Jax Slayher
- 2022: Ricky Johnson
- 2023: Isaiah Maxwell

==== Gay Performer of the Year ====
- 2018: Boomer Banks
- 2019: Calvin Banks
- 2020: Pierce Paris
- 2021: Michael Boston
- 2022: Roman Todd
- 2023: Jayden Marcos

==== Trans Performer of the Year ====
- 2018: Chanel Santini
- 2019: Chanel Santini (as Best Trans Performer)
- 2020: Aubrey Kate; Luke Hudson
- 2021: Aubrey Kate
- 2022: Aubrey Kate
- 2023: Emma Rose

==== Legacy Award ====
- 2009: Patricia Field (as Lifetime Achievement for Sexy Fashion)
- 2011: Dan Savage (as Lifetime Achievement in Sex Culture)
- 2023: Angela White; Natalie Mars; Reese Rideout (as the Cybersocket Legacy Award)
