= Cody Seiya =

American porngographic film actor

- Born: 1992 or 1993 (age 33–34); Orange County, California, USA
- Other name: Cody Silver
- Occupation: Pornographic film actor
- Years active: 2020–present

Cody Seiya (born 1992 or 1993), also known professionally as Cody Silver, is an American gay pornographic film actor.

== Life and career ==
Born into a conservative Jewish-Chinese family from California, Seiya joined OnlyFans in 2020, the same year he graduated from the School for Visual Arts. He was subsequently nominated as the 'best newcomer' by GayVN Awards in 2022. Seiya stated that his choice to enter the adult film industry was due to needing to pay his bills in the midst of the COVID-19 pandemic.

A frequent feature in the GayVN Awards, he has also received nominations for Fleshbot, XBIZ, and XMA awards.

As an Asian in the adult film industry, Seiya stated his difficulty with discrimination in the industry as well as the fetishization of Asian men. He has also participated in fundraisers for the Free Speech Coalition.
