= Strike the Mics =

Studio album by Vintage Blue
- Released: February 14, 2012
- Recorded: Rax Trax Recording
- Genre: Rock
- Length: 43:04
- Producer: Jamie Candiloro

Vintage Blue chronology
Strike the Mics (2012)	No Going Back (2014)

Strike the Mics is the first studio album released by Vintage Blue on February 14, 2012. It contains thirteen tracks produced by Jamie Candiloro. It was recorded at Rax Trax Recording in Chicago, Illinois. The album has received national AAA radio airplay at WOCM and WXRT.

Critics described the record and band as "the musical equivalent of comfort food. The rock band’s sound is familiar and accessible without a hint of pretense.”. As the band toured the record, the live shows were said to be high energy and interactive fun for all involved. One reviewer said: "Vintage Blue is the kind of rock band I like to see, because they just wanna have a good time. There’s no pretensions about putting on a perfect show. It’s much more important that everyone have fun and leave smiling.".

== Track listing ==
No.	Title	Length
1.	"Set You Free"	3:18
2.	"Unchained"	3:41
3.	"California Road"	3:01
4.	"Speak"	3:39
5.	"Hey Hey"	2:57
6.	"Sleep On This"	2:41
7.	"Here To Stay"	4:11
8.	"Just Breathe"	4:08
9.	"What Lies"	2:54
10.	"Help Me See"	2:49
11.	"Against Time"	3:25
12.	"Great Divide"	3:23
13.	"True"	2:57

== Personnel ==
- Benjamin Bassett – lead guitar, lead vocals
- Ryan Tibbs – rhythm guitar, lead vocals
- Cesar Corral – bass guitar
- Will Crowden – drums
- Matt Zimmerman – saxophonist, background vocals
