= Mike O'Meara =

American radio host (born 1959)

- Born: Michael Sean Patrick O'Meara; June 22, 1959 (age 67); Glastonbury, Connecticut, U.S.
- Presenting career
- Show: The Mike O'Meara Show
- Station: KCJJ
- Time slot: Weekdays 10:30am-12pm on mikeomearashow.com (ET)
- Style: Talk, guy talk, comedy
- Country: United States
- Website: www.mikeomearashow.com

Michael Sean Patrick O'Meara (born June 22, 1959, in Glastonbury, Connecticut) is a podcast personality, the host of The Mike O'Meara Show, previously a nationally syndicated radio show that returned as a podcast. Previously he was the co-host of the nationally syndicated The Don and Mike Show. He was also the co-host of The Kirk and Mike Show weekday mornings on WVRX-FM in the Washington, D.C., area from 2010 to 2011.

O'Meara is a graduate of American University. Before being teamed with co-host Don Geronimo, he worked as a bar and nightclub disc jockey and held many positions in radio. He was partnered with Don Geronimo for more than 20 years, first at WAVA-FM (105.1 FM) in Washington from 1985 to 1991, then at WJFK-FM from 1991 to 2008. His talk show was revived in 2009 as a free podcast as well as a weekly one-hour premium bonus show for paying subscribers.

== Radio ==
On February 4, 2008, WJFK-FM announced that Geronimo's last day would be May 30, 2008, and that The Don and Mike Show would continue as The Mike O'Meara Show with Don and Mike Show regulars Buzz Burbank, Joe Ardinger, and Robb Spewak. The announcement brought to rest speculation about the show's future. Geronimo's retirement was moved up to April 11, 2008. The Mike O'Meara Show began on April 14, 2008, having moved the show back to the WJFK studio in Fairfax, Virginia. After one week, former Don and Mike Show producer Beth Ann McBride returned to become the producer of The Mike O'Meara Show.

On July 14, 2009, it was announced his show would no longer air on flagship WJFK Manassas-Washington DC, and his show will remain in syndication as "best-ofs" for 30 days before ending completely. The final broadcast of the Mike O'Meara Show on WJFK-FM was on Friday, July 17, 2009; the following Monday, July 20, 2009, the station started broadcasting in its new all-sports format.

On December 7, 2009, The Mike O'Meara Show premiered on a daily podcast. The podcast is also broadcast on KCJJ in Iowa City, Iowa, a former CBS affiliate of The Don and Mike Show. The show is hosted by O'Meara, Robb Spewak and Oscar Santana, and is one hour long.

O'Meara returned to broadcast radio on July 7, 2010, teamed with Kirk McEwen mornings on "105.9 The Edge", WVRX-FM. This show ended on September 19, 2011, when WVRX changed formats to a simulcast of sister station WMAL.

O'Meara announced on his podcast on November 13, 2012, that "The Mike O'Meara Show" will be returning to the airwaves. O'Meara, along with Burbank, Spewak and Santana, will be returning on January 14, 2013, to talker WTNT, 730 AM/102.9 FM. Their show will run from 7pm to 9pm ET.

On May 31, 2014, Open Mike: From Corporate Radio to New Media: The Story of The Mike O'Meara Show was released, which covers the story of the start of the podcast and was written by W. Michael Kelley. The book has sold more than 400 copies.

== Restaurant businesses ==
In addition to his radio career, O'Meara also owned O'Meara's Restaurant and Pub in Manassas, Virginia, from March 2003 until its closing in April 2008.

== Personal life ==
O'Meara is the father of three children, and has been married three times.
