= Celebrity Watch Party =

2020 American reality show

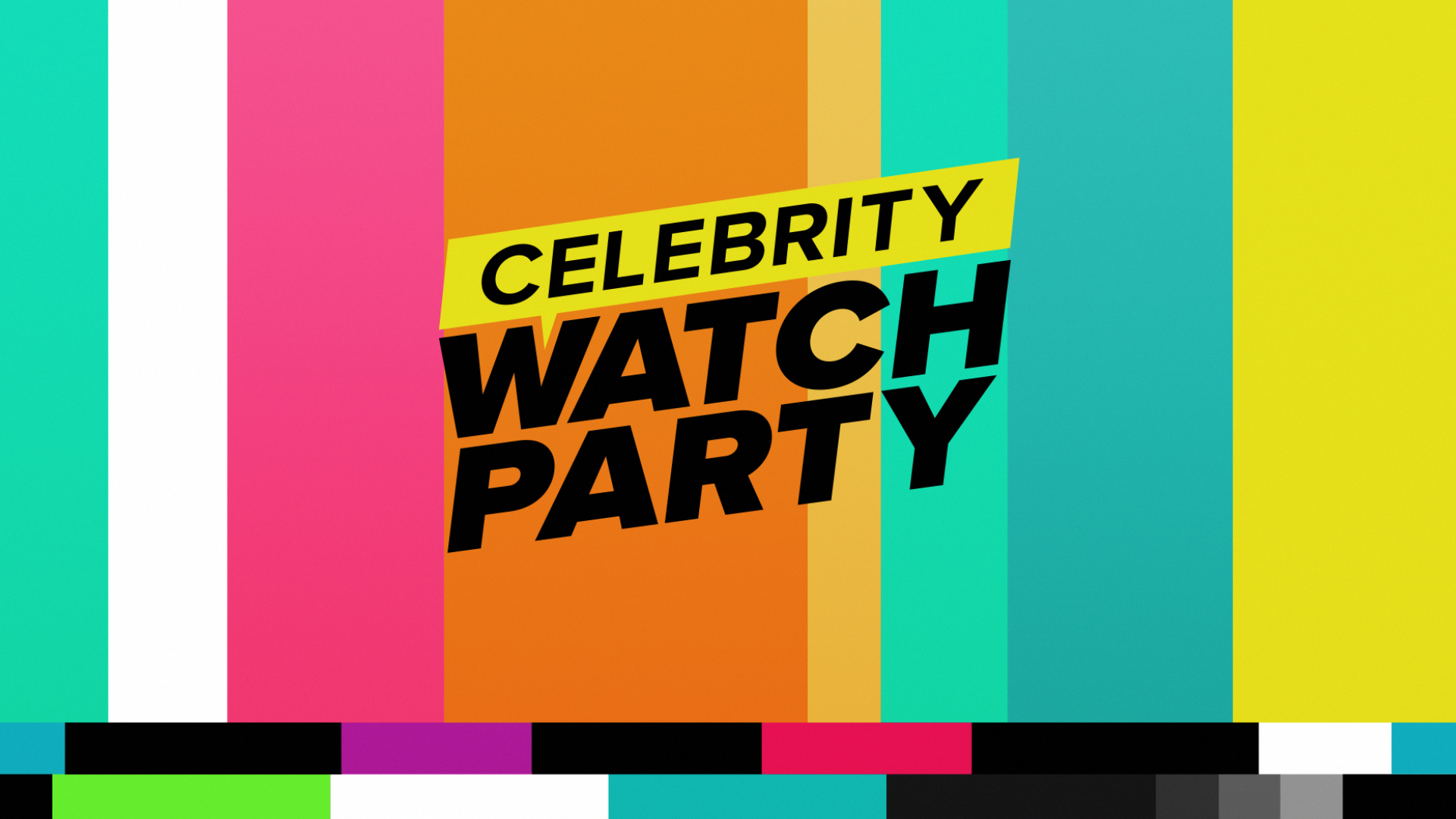
- Genre: Reality
- Based on: Gogglebox by Stephen Lambert
- Narrated by: Dude Walker
- Country of origin: United States
- Original language: English
- No. of seasons: 1
- No. of episodes: 11

Production
- Executive producers: Becca Walker; Jack Burgess; Mike Cotton; Tania Alexander; Tim Harcourt; Stephen Lambert
- Production companies: Studio Lambert; All3Media

Original release
- Network: Fox
- Release: May 7 – July 23, 2020

Celebrity Watch Party (known internationally as Celebrity Gogglebox USA) is an American reality television series that aired on Fox from May 7 to July 23, 2020. The show is based on the British television series Gogglebox and features celebrities recording themselves watching and reacting to television shows and news stories inside their homes. Due to the impact of the COVID-19 pandemic on television, Fox pushed back the premieres of some scripted series to later in the year and opted to create Celebrity Watch Party as one of two shows—along with The Masked Singer: After the Mask—that could be produced remotely to fill the programming gap.

== Production ==
On April 30, 2020, it was announced that the series would premiere on May 7, 2020. The initial celebrity participants announced included Rob Lowe, Meghan Trainor, Joe Buck, Raven-Symoné, Master P, Romeo Miller, JoJo Siwa, Steve Wozniak, Curtis Stone, and Robert and Kym Herjavec. On May 7, 2020, Sharon, Ozzy, and Kelly Osbourne, Tyra Banks, and Reggie Bush were announced to be celebrity participants in the series as well. Justin Long, Jesse McCartney, Jodie Sweetin, Andrea Barber, and Lindsay and Aliana Lohan later joined as participants in future episodes.

On July 9, 2020, it was announced that the series was extended an extra week, with a new installment airing on July 23.

== International broadcasts ==
The series has aired in Australia on ViacomCBS-owned Network 10 since June 11, 2020 (Network 10 also co-produces and airs the Australian version of the series, under the original Gogglebox title). It is locally edited by 10 with an Australian narrator amongst other changes.

In the United Kingdom, the series has aired on E4 (the sister network of Channel 4, which broadcasts the original British version) since May 13, 2020, and is available on-demand via All 4.

== Episodes ==
No.	Title	Original release date	Prod. code	U.S. viewers (millions)
1	"The Celebrity Watch Party Has Begun"	May 7, 2020	CWP-101	1.81
Celebrity appearances include Tyra Banks and her mother, Romeo and Master P, Steve Wozniak and his wife, Robert and Kym Herjavec, Curtis Stone and Lindsay Price, Meghan Trainor and her family, Joe Buck and Michelle Beisner-Buck, Sharon Osbourne, Ozzy Osbourne, Kelly Osbourne, Rob Lowe and his family, JoJo Siwa, and Raven-Symoné. Shows and segments watched include The Masked Singer, Elephant, Good Morning America on dogs detecting COVID-19, Raiders of the Lost Ark, The Last Dance, CBS This Morning on the supposed reemergence of Kim Jong-un, RuPaul's Drag Race, the simulated 2020 Kentucky Derby, and Dr. Pimple Popper.
2	"Nobody Puts Celebrity in the Corner"	May 14, 2020	CWP-102	1.58
Celebrity appearances include Reggie Bush and his wife Lilit, Romeo & Master P, Justin Long and his brother Christian, Raven-Symoné with her friends Brian and Austin Brown, Curtis Stone & Lindsay Price and Lindsay's brother Brian, the Osbournes, Tyra Banks and her mother, Steve Wozniak and his wife Janet, JoJo Siwa and her mother Jessalynn, Joe Buck and Michelle Beisner-Buck, Robert and Kym Herjavec. Shows and segments watched include 9-1-1, Good Morning America on murder hornets, Nailed It!, Entertainment Tonight on Elon Musk's baby's name, Gordon Ramsay's 24 Hours to Hell and Back, The Joy of Painting, Kings of Pain, and Dirty Dancing.
3	"The Deadliest Couch"	May 21, 2020	CWP-103	1.37
Celebrity appearances include Romeo and Master P, Tyra Banks and her mother, JoJo Siwa and her mother, Justin Long and his brother Christian, Curtis Stone & Lindsay Price, the Buck family, Steve and Janet Wozniak, Reggie and Lilit Bush, the Osbournes, Jesse McCartney and his fiancée Katie, Raven-Symoné and her friends. Shows include Ultimate Tag, Graduate Together, 2020 Beverly Hills Dog Show, Mission: Impossible, Our Planet, Deadliest Catch, and The Masked Singer season finale.
4	"The One Where Celebrities Watch Friends"	May 28, 2020	CWP-104	1.60
Celebrity appearances include Jodie Sweetin and Andrea Barber, JoJo Siwa and her mother, the Buck family, Romeo & Master P, Tyra Banks and her mother, Steve Wozniak and his wife, Reggie and Lilit Bush, the Osbournes, Raven-Symoné and her friends, Curtis Stone & Lindsay Price. Shows and segments watched include America's Got Talent, Celebrity Family Feud, Cuomo Prime Time's Chris Cuomo interviewing his brother Andrew Cuomo, Titanic, 90 Day Fiancé: Before the 90 Days, Shark Tank, and Labor of Love.
5	"Lindsay Lohan Joins the Party"	June 4, 2020	CWP-105	1.44
Celebrity appearances include Lindsay and Aliana Lohan, the Buck family, the Osbournes, Curtis Stone and Lindsay Price, Tyra Banks and her mother, Steve Wozniak and his wife, Reggie and Lilit Bush, JoJo Siwa and her mother, Raven-Symoné and friends, Romeo and Master P. Shows and segments watched include Extreme Makeover: Home Edition, Haircut Night in America, Space Launch Live (the launch of SpaceX), The Real Housewives of Beverly Hills, My Feet are Killing Me, Married at First Sight: Australia, and CBSN on the George Floyd protests.
6	"The Jersey-Shore Shank Redemption"	June 11, 2020	CWP-106	1.57
Celebrity appearances include the Osbournes, JoJo Siwa and her mother, Curtis Stone & Lindsay Price, Raven-Symoné and her friends, Reggie & Lilit Bush, Romeo & Master P, Lindsay and Aliana Lohan, Tyra Banks and her mother, Steve and Janet Wozniak, Jodie Sweetin & Andrea Barber, and the Buck family. Shows and segments watched include Who Wants to Be a Millionaire, The Today Show on the proposal for bringing back the NBA 2020 season, Fuller House, Jersey Shore: Family Vacation, Hostile Planet, The Shawshank Redemption, and Magic for Humans.
7	"It's a Party with the Fab Five"	June 18, 2020	CWP-107	1.57
Celebrity appearances include Tyra Banks and her mother, the Osbournes, Raven-Symoné Maday and her friends, Romeo & Master P, Curtis Stone & Lindsay Price, the Buck family, Steve & Janet Wozniak, and JoJo Siwa and her mother. Shows and segments watched include Queer Eye, Don't, WPLG-TV news on "Cowboy's Catch", Million Dollar Listing Los Angeles, Gordon Ramsay: Uncharted, The Thomas John Experience, and Botched.
8	"Father's Day Watch Party"	June 25, 2020	CWP-108	1.40
Celebrity appearances include Curtis Stone & Lindsey Price, JoJo Siwa and her mother, Reggie & Lilit Bush, Raven-Symoné Maday and her friends, the Buck family, the Osbournes, Tyra Banks & her mother, and Steve & Janet Wozniak. Shows and segments watched include America's Got Talent, Good Morning America on "Shark Scare", Sex and the City, Bizarre Foods with Andrew Zimmern, Night on Earth, Good Morning America on Juneteenth, and Dads.
9	"Star Spangled Couches"	July 9, 2020	CWP-109	1.45
Celebrity appearances include Romeo & Master P, the Buck family, Raven-Symoné Maday and her friends, Tyra Banks and her mother, Curtis Stone & Lindsey Price, Reggie & Lilit Bush, the Osbournes, JoJo Siwa and her mother, and Steve & Janet Wozniak. Shows and segments watched include World of Dance, Good Morning America on Kanye West's 2020 presidential campaign, Jaws, Coyote Peterson: Brave the Wild, Married at First Sight: Australia, Lenox Hill, and the 2020 Nathan's Hot Dog Eating Contest.
10	"Say I do Love a Watch Party"	July 16, 2020	CWP-110	1.37
Celebrity appearances include Curtis Stone & Lindsey Price, Raven-Symoné Maday and friends, Reggie & Lilit Bush, Robert & Kym Herjavec, the Buck family, JoJo Siwa and her mother Jessalyn, Tyra Banks and her mother, the Osbournes, Romeo and Master P, and Steve and Janet Wozniak. Shows and segments watched include Labor of Love, Hostile Planet, Say I Do: Surprise Weddings, Good Morning America on RV travel during the pandemic, Revenge Prank, Dr. Pimple Popper, and Misery.
11	"The Couch is Lava"	July 23, 2020	CWP-111	1.44
Celebrity appearances include Raven-Symoné Maday, Reggie & Lilit Bush, the Buck family, Robert & Kym Herjavec, Curtis Stone & Lindsey Price, Tyra Banks & her mother, the Osbournes, Romeo & Master P, JoJo Siwa and her mother Jessalynn, and Steve & Janet Wozniak. Shows watched include Undercover Boss, Floor Is Lava, Jersey Shore: Family Vacation, Dating Around, Selling Sunset, and Taken.

== Ratings ==
Viewership and ratings per episode of Celebrity Watch Party
No.	Title	Air date	Rating/share (18–49)	Viewers (millions)	DVR (18–49)	DVR viewers (millions)	Total (18–49)	Total viewers (millions)	Ref.
1	"The Celebrity Watch Party Has Begun"	May 7, 2020	0.4/2	1.81	0.1	0.25	0.5	2.07	
2	"Nobody Puts Celebrity in the Corner"	May 14, 2020	0.4/2	1.58	0.1	0.18	0.4	1.76	
3	"The Deadliest Couch"	May 21, 2020	0.3/2	1.37	0.1	0.18	0.4	1.54	
4	"The One Where Celebrities Watch Friends"	May 28, 2020	0.4/2	1.60	0.1	0.25	0.4	1.85	
5	"Lindsay Lohan Joins the Party"	June 4, 2020	0.4/2	1.44	0.1	0.23	0.4	1.68	
6	"The Jersey-Shore Shank Redemption"	June 11, 2020	0.4/2	1.57	0.1	0.23	0.5	1.80	
7	"It's a Party with the Fab Five"	June 18, 2020	0.4/2	1.57	0.1	0.22	0.5	1.78	
8	"Father's Day Watch Party"	June 25, 2020	0.4/2	1.40	0.0	0.19	0.4	1.60	
9	"Star Spangled Couches"	July 9, 2020	0.3/2	1.45	0.1	0.16	0.4	1.61	
10	"Say I do Love a Watch Party"	July 16, 2020	0.3/2	1.37	0.1	0.22	0.4	1.59	
11	"The Couch is Lava"	July 23, 2020	0.3/2	1.44	0.1	0.23	0.4	1.67	
