= Seacrets =

Restaurant and music venue in Ocean City, Maryland

Coordinates: 38°22′29″N 75°04′18″W

Seacrets is a waterfront bar, restaurant, nightclub, and concert venue in Ocean City, Maryland founded in 1988.

== History ==
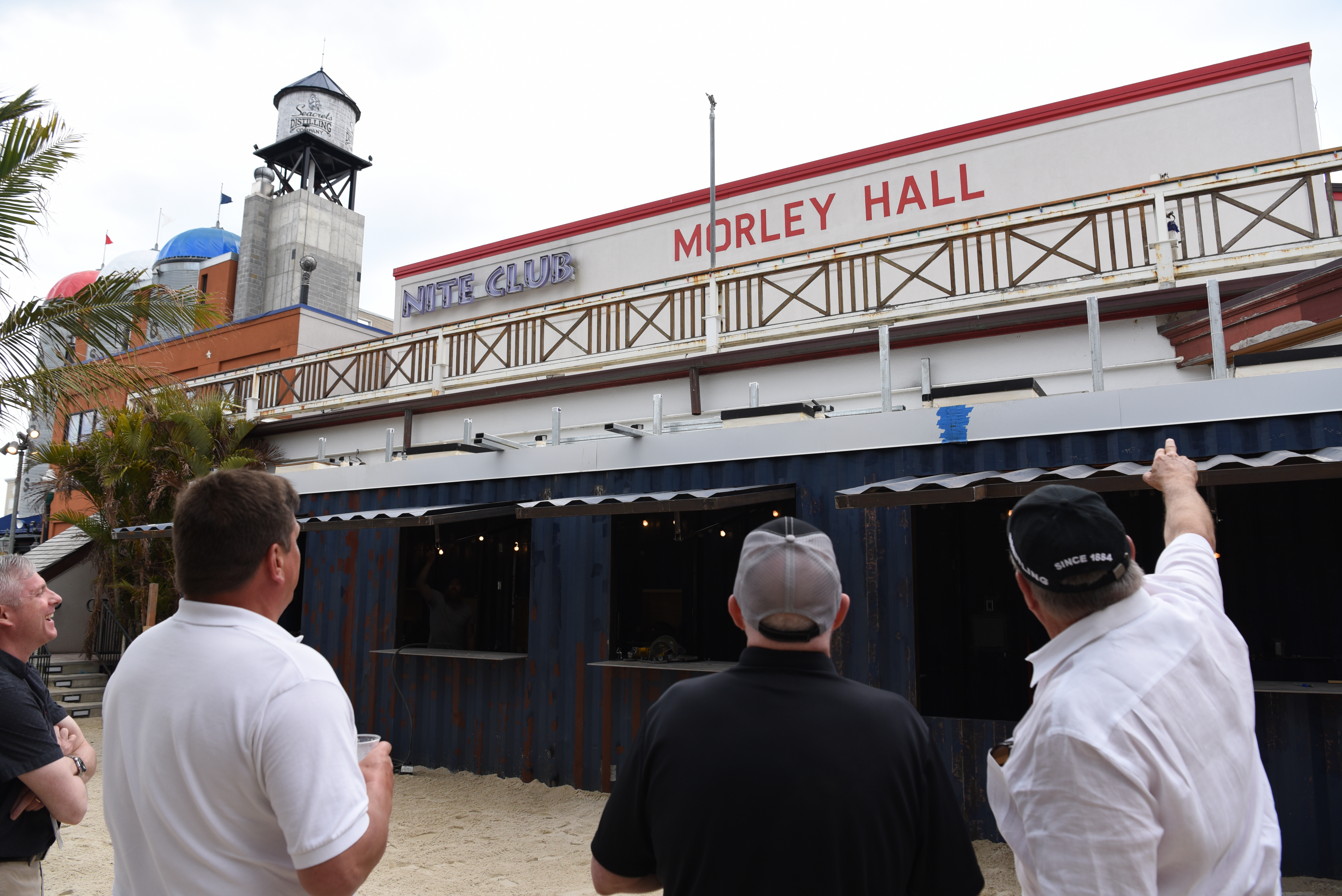
Morley Hall in 2021

Seacrets was founded in 1988 by Leighton Moore. Moore, an Ocean City, Maryland native, was inspired by a trip to Jamaica. It began as a small, locals-only tiki bar with two round bars. The name was chosen because "Ocean City can't keep a secret." To get a membership card, original patrons had to "prove yourself" by visiting three times.

The business grew, adding a new bar every year. In its fifth year of operation, the beach area nearly doubled in size, allowing patrons to float on rafts while having drinks. By its tenth year, the venue continued to expand. The addition of Morley Hall turned the bar into a nightclub. Seacrets also launched a radio station, 98.1 FM Irie Radio. Floating rafts in the bay were later removed.

== Description ==
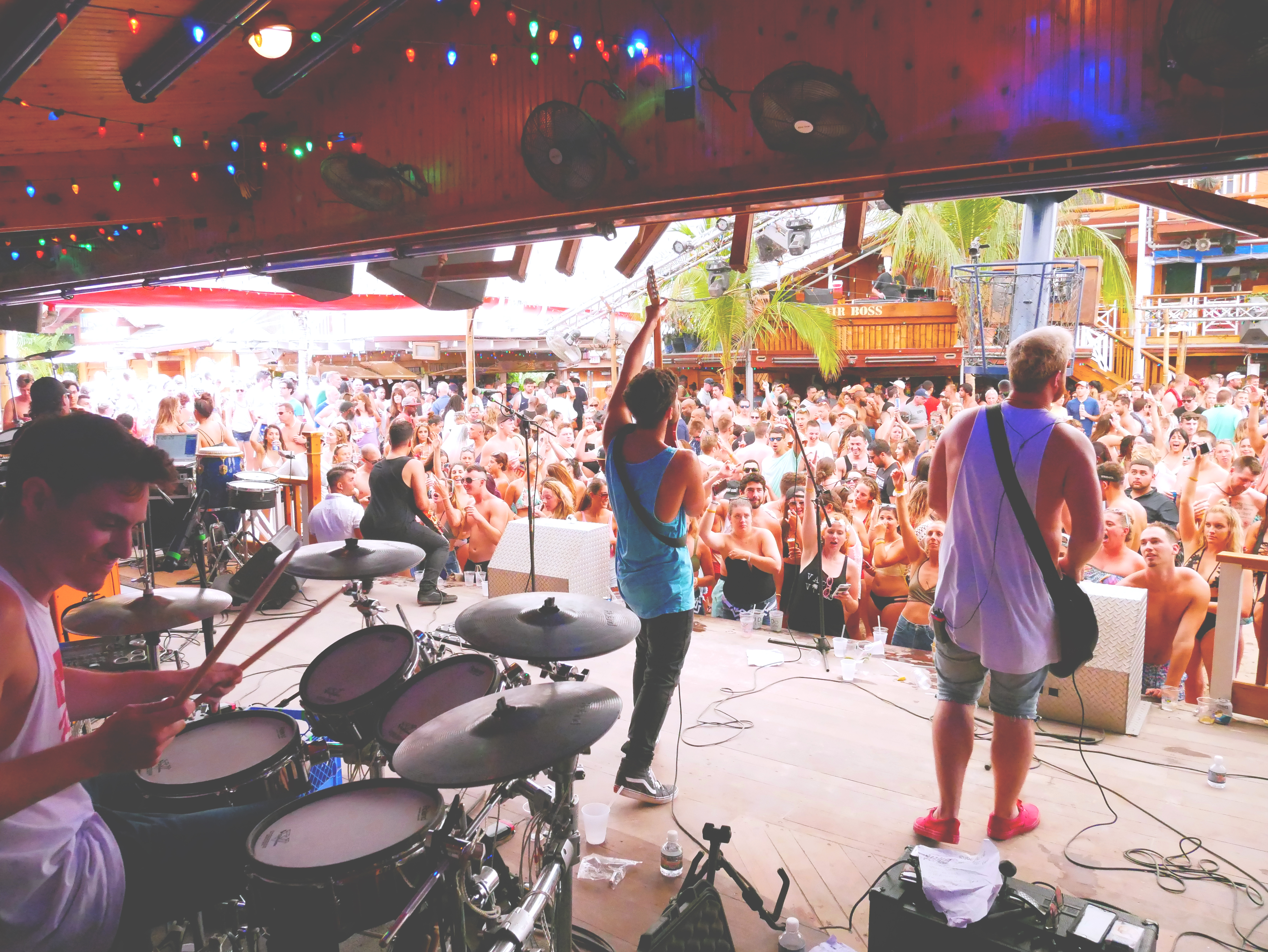
Seacrets in 2017

The complex is located along the Isle of Wight Bay and has a Jamaican or Caribbean theme. It is decorated with palm trees and tiki torches. The venue encompasses a six-acre compound that includes 19 tiki bars, a distillery, a radio station, a nightclub, and five stages. It has the capacity to hold 5,000 people. The outdoor area features sand and imported palm trees. Patrons can be served drinks at tables and booths that are partially submerged in the water of the bay. There is also a gift shop. The complex has 140,000 square feet of eating space and dancing areas.

=== Reception ===
The venue is known as "Destination Jamaica, U.S.A." and has been compared to Universal Studios or the set of MTV Spring Break. Approximately 800,000 people visit annually. It has been listed as one of the country's highest-grossing bars and nightclubs. In 2021, it was reported that the business was having its best year ever.

=== Menu ===
The restaurant serves lunch and dinner with a Jamaican-influenced menu that changes seasonally. Dishes have included jerk chicken, Jamaican pizza, Caribbean quesadillas, burgers, salads, ribs, and steak, with a focus on locally sourced seafood. A "jerk-chicken cheesesteak" has also been on the menu. The bar serves beers, wines, and handcrafted cocktails made with spirits from its on-site distillery. Frozen drinks mentioned include the "Pain in de Ass" and "Dirty Banana." Grapefruit and orange "crushes" are also available.
