= Skin: A History of Nudity in the Movies =

- Directed by: Danny Wolf
- Written by: Paul Fishbein; Danny Wolf
- Produced by: Jim "Mr. Skin" McBride
- Edited by: Steven L. Austin
- Production company: Plausible Films
- Distributed by: Quiver Distribution
- Release date: August 18, 2020
- Running time: 130 minutes
- Language: English

Skin: A History of Nudity in the Movies is a 2020 documentary film about the history of nudity in film. It was directed by Danny Wolf and executive produced by Jim "Mr. Skin" McBride, who is also interviewed in the film. It was released on August 18, 2020 by Plausible Films, and was distributed by Quiver Distribution.

Among those interviewed about their nude appearances on film are Malcolm McDowell about his appearance in Caligula; Erica Gavin about her appearance in Vixen!; Sean Young about her appearance in No Way Out; Shannon Elizabeth about her appearance in American Pie; Cerina Vincent about her appearance in Not Another Teen Movie; Rena Riffel about her roles in Showgirls and Striptease; and Mariel Hemingway about her appearances in both Personal Best and Star 80. A number of film directors, including Peter Bogdanovich, Joe Dante, Kevin Smith, Amy Heckerling, Martha Coolidge, and Kristanna Loken were also interviewed for Skin regarding their experience directing films with nudity.

== Reception ==
On the review aggregator website Rotten Tomatoes, 85% of 40 critics' reviews are positive, with an average rating of 7/10. The website's consensus reads: "Revealing in more ways than one, Skin: A History of Nudity in the Movies lives up to its title with a comprehensive overview of its subject that goes well beneath the surface." Metacritic, which uses a weighted average, assigned the film a score of 64 out of 100, based on 7 critics, indicating "generally favorable" reviews.
