= Mike O'Meara Show =

Daily podcast show

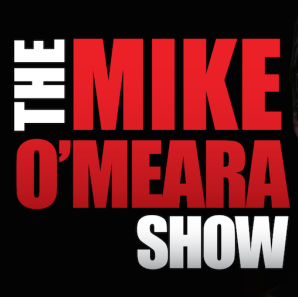
- Other names: TMOS
- Genre: Talk radio/podcast
- Running time: Approximately 80 minutes
- Country of origin: United States
- Syndicates: KCJJ
- Starring: Mike O'Meara, Robb Spewak
- Announcer: Dude Walker
- Produced by: Robb Spewak
- Recording studio: Washington, D.C., Fort Myers, Florida, and Leesburg, Virginia
- Original release: April 14, 2008
- No. of episodes: Podcast: 3,249 (as of April 7, 2024)
- Website: mikeomearashow.com

The Mike O'Meara Show is a daily podcast available through its website or iTunes. The show is hosted by Mike O'Meara and includes Robb Spewak. The Mike O'Meara Bonus Show is available every Friday to VIP members through their website or by purchasing them through iTunes. The show is also streamed via video through their website, TMOS phone app or YouTube.

== Format ==
The show focuses on current events, politics, pop culture, sports and the lives of the members of the show. The context of the material is discussed in a humorous manner. The daily podcast is broadcast-friendly, whereas the Bonus Show is uncensored. The podcasts are approximately 80 minutes long; 60 minutes are used to discuss various topics, ten minutes for current events (currently known as "The Roundtable"), and the last ten minutes feature Robb's presentation of audio and video clips (currently known as "The Flip Side", due to Robb flipping his car in 2023).

== History ==
The Mike O'Meara Show was a nationally syndicated radio talk show featuring shock jocks Mike O'Meara, Buzz Burbank, and Robb Spewak. It succeeded the Don and Mike Show after Don Geronimo retired on April 11, 2008. Most stations which syndicated the previous show continued to air The Mike O'Meara Show via the CBS-owned Westwood One Radio Network. The show's flagship station was 106.7 WJFK-FM in Washington, D.C. The show was named "Best Afternoon Drive Radio Show" in the 2008 Best of Northern Virginia list in Northern Virginia Magazine.

In July 2009, when its flagship station, 106.7 WJFK-FM, was converted to an all-sports radio station by CBS Radio, The Mike O'Meara Show was discontinued on 106.7. Simultaneously, the Westwood One Radio Network ceased syndication of the show nationwide. The term of Mike O'Meara's contract with CBS Radio ended on December 1, 2009.

On December 7, 2009, The Mike O'Meara Show returned as a podcast, and broadcast on terrestrial radio during the 5:00 p.m. drive slot on KCJJ in Coralville, Iowa, a former CBS affiliate of The Don and Mike Show.

The podcast format of The Mike O'Meara Show has taken on three incarnations. The Mike O'Meara Show is the daily podcast that is available for download around the world and kept broadcast-friendly for airing on terrestrial radio. The Mike O'Meara Bonus Hour is a weekly podcast available via subscription, which is uncensored and the topics covered extend to those typically not allowed in radio or they take on a game format. The Mike O'Meara Show RAW started as a series of three one-hour-long podcasts available via subscription, which covered topics of sex, porn and strippers. In the RAW 1.0 series, Mike and the gang entertained porn star Carmen Hart (Episode 2) and celebrated Robb's birthday by bringing in two dancers (Episode 3). RAW 3, included audio taken from the show's spring break trip to Florida.

O'Meara announced on his podcast on November 13, 2012, that "The Mike O'Meara Show" will be returning to the airwaves. O'Meara, along with Burbank, Spewak and Santana, returned on January 14, 2013, to talker WTNT/730 AM; however their stay on WTNT was short-lived after that station changed formats in December 2013.

The 1,000th free episode of The Mike O'Meara Show took place on February 19, 2014, while the 2,000th free episode aired on May 4, 2018, and the 3,000th aired on January 24, 2023.

On April 3, 2024, O'Meara announced that Santana had left the show, and that the show's ties with Santana's Podville Media had been severed. O'Meara intended to continue the show, with Spewak staying on board.

== Personalities ==
The show is hosted by Mike O'Meara. Daily segments include: The Flip Side (formerly the Audio Vault and the Digital Dumpster), produced by Robb Spewak and the Roundtable (formerly News You May Not Need), produced by Mike O'Meara. For many years, Oscar Santana produced the entertainment report, Oscarazzi, when Mike was out of the studio, and served as the commenter every Friday for Oscar's Take in lieu of News You May Not Need.

=== Mike O'Meara ===
Michael Sean Patrick O'Meara, born June 22, 1959 (age 67) in Glastonbury, Connecticut, is the host. O'Meara worked as a bar and nightclub disc jockey and held many positions in radio. He was partnered with Don Geronimo for 23 years: first at WAVA-FM (105.1 FM) in Washington (1985–1991), then at WJFK-FM from 1991 to 2008. Mike had a one-year stint as the host of the Kirk and Mike show on WVRX-FM 105.9 The Edge, until the station flipped formats. O'Meara is a vocal supporter of the Boston Red Sox and Washington Capitals. O'Meara is a graduate of American University. He is the father of two daughters and one son. Mike is known for his impersonations on the show that include former Minnesota Governor Jesse Ventura, Simon Cowell, former newsman Larry King, Regis Philbin former President Bill Clinton, and the classic musings of former D.C. Mayor Marion Barry.

=== Robb Spewak ===
Robert Wadams Spewak, Jr., born March 8, 1971 (age 55), was the "FOURTH man" on The Don and Mike Show, having served as an intern, writer, and producer. He was first introduced to Don and Mike by being a frequent caller to their show. Spewak, also known as "Robbay," served three times as the producer of the Don and Mike Show and was the last person to serve in that position. He is now the in-studio producer of The Mike O'Meara Show. His Audio Vault segments are a daily part of the show. A popular occasional segment features Robb hosting game shows that are variations of traditional TV game shows such as Match Game, Jeopardy!, The Dating Game and Password. Robb also hosts Quench for Knowledge in person at Quench bar and restaurant in Rockville, Maryland about once a month. He previously hosted The Robb Spewak Show, which aired Fridays on KCJJ in Iowa City. Robb is very involved in charities that raise funds towards battling lymphoma and leukemia (particularly in children) as a tribute to his son, who is a leukemia survivor. He lives in Leesburg, Virginia, with his wife Cary (born September 23; married October 12, 1996); kids Julia (born December 18, 2000 (age 25)), and Robert III (born September 30, 2002 (age 23)); and dog Linus. Robb has an entire area in his house devoted to Elvis Presley and owns an actual piece of the Hindenburg.

=== Former personalities ===
==== Oscar Santana ====
Best known for his work in the Big O and Dukes Show, which aired prior to The Mike O'Meara Show at WJFK, Oscar, born March 30, 1978 (age 48), is the one who convinced Mike to bring back The Mike O'Meara Show via podcast. For Oscar's effort, Mike invited him to join the show as a co-host. In a similar manner, Oscar Santana hosted The Big O and Dukes Show with Chad Dukes via podcast from 2010-2020 and "Tech 411" with entrepreneur Todd Moore from 2011-2019. He is also the Executive Producer of "Dingman Bootstrapped", a podcast featuring graduates of the Robert H. Smith School of Business at the University of Maryland where Oscar received his MBA in 2016.

In 2017, Santana teamed with Charlie Birney to found Podcast Village, later renamed to Podville Media.

==== Buzz Burbank ====
Buzz Burbank, whose real name is Michael J. Elston was born October 7, 1953 (age 72), was the news reporter for The Mike O'Meara Show. He is originally from Wichita, Kansas where his father and stepmother Phyllis live. He is a 1975 graduate of Wichita State University, where he majored in English. Burbank's career began at KLEO in Wichita in 1972. He has also worked in New York, Philadelphia, San Diego, Stereo KDWB Saint Paul/ Minneapolis and New Orleans, hosting talk and entertainment shows. He was the morning drive News Anchor at WBBM-FM in Chicago, Illinois and for Bonneville Chicago Radio Group, where he won the Associated Press award for Best Newscast. He served as news director at Fairbanks/WZZD Philadelphia.

Burbank began with Don and Mike on December 2, 1991. Don had known him from working together in Chicago and invited him to join the show. Since his first name is Michael, it would have caused mass confusion on-air with two people sharing the same name. Don's real name is also Mike, so he particularly demanded they rename Mr. Elston. Don suggested "Buzz", as it connotes a sense of readiness appropriately associated with a newsman. Mike suggested the alliterative "Burbank" as a tip of the hat to Gary Owens, the announcer for the TV show "Laugh-In", whose resonant timbre is similar to Buzz's delivery (Gary Burbank, a Cincinnati radio personality, adopted his on-air name for the same reason; Buzz and Gary are in no way related). As Gary Owens would open every episode of "Laugh-In" by saying "And now, from beautiful downtown Burbank", a reference to Burbank, California, where the show was shot, Mike suggested Elston's last name be "Burbank". This joke was reinforced as Don and Mike spent many years opening their program with the phrase "from beautiful toothless Fairfax", a reference to Fairfax, Virginia, home of the show's flagship station, WJFK-FM.

On May 14, 2012, Buzz announced he was leaving the show to start his own news-based podcast. However, Buzz retracted his decision after an agreement between Buzz and Mike was worked out to keep Buzz on TMOS.

A year later, Buzz Burbank's departure from TMOS would become a reality. Mike O'Meara announced on May 20, 2013, that Buzz resigned after the taping of the May 17, 2013, show. Mike O'Meara stated that Buzz Burbank wished to pursue other career opportunities. The Buzz Burbank News and Comment podcast debuted on June 11, 2013, on The RELM Network.

==== Marc Ronick ====
AKA Menasha, Spaz, Chronic. The show's former business manager was the brunt of Robb's Jew jokes. Marc was a former intern for the old Don & Mike Show one summer back in 1993. He reunited with Mike and the gang in January 2010 as one of their first sales executives. On February 12, 2010 (episode 49), Mike announced that he was promoting Marc to Business Manager.

On June 28, 2013, on Podcast No. 845, Mike O'Meara formally announced Marc Ronick resigned his position. Mike O'Meara referred to the departure as a mutual decision, stating Marc Ronick would continue to play other minor roles for the show.

Shortly thereafter, Ronick announced the launch of The RELM Network and his business partnership with Buzz Burbank and Lowell Melser (WBAL-TV).

==== R.J. Diaz ====
A.K.A. "Inchworm," "Mr. French," "The Butler," "The Riddler" R.J. joined the show by volunteering to become the Chief Engineer.

==== Matt "Pony Boy" Bluhm ====
Pony was the executive producer, server administrator, and sole customer service rep of the show from 2013 to 2023, and he also designed multiple iterations of the show website. He is a big fan of Japan, but not of driving at night.

==== Madeline "Maddy" Masiello ====
Maddy was a TMOS intern, then returned to work full time as an Associate Producer from 2018-2021. The daughter of former Buffalo mayor Anthony Masiello, Maddy was in charge of the video feed and social media outlets.

== Characters ==
- Internet Radio Tommy: Hosts his own show, The Internet Tommy Radio Show, which airs from his mother's basement. This wannabe disc jockey is often visited by Robb, Buzz and Oscar and is furiously picked on by his guests.
- Frankie: Mike's chihuahua. He often stops by to speak to the rest of the show's cast to complain about Mike and explain the frequent "presents" he leaves for everyone in the studio.
- Charly Stuangstabalack: (voiced by Mike O'Meara) The elderly employee of the show, with the mind of a child, drops by to comment on topics every once in a while.
- Sex Boy: This immature adolescent with a deep bass voice drops by to explain the intricacies of sex.
- Oscar's Papa: He calls into the show to speak to Oscar, expresses his disappointment in him, and attempts to steal Oscar's girlfriend from him.
- Bawlmer Billy Sikorsky: He is a sportscaster, known for his heavy Baltimore accent and disappointment at the state of the Baltimore Orioles; his catchphrase being "What a nightmare!"

== Affiliates ==
Call Sign	Frequency	City	Time
KCJJ	1630 kHz	Iowa City, Iowa	4:45 – 6:00 pm (Central)

KCJJ originally carried the Don and Mike Show and the Robb Spewak Show. It is the only affiliate that the guys have visited since the inception of The Mike O'Meara Show.

In December 2013, former affiliate WTNT (AM) changed formats, leaving no place for "TMOS". The show was also briefly carried on WAVD Ocean City ("The Wave 97.1 FM") in 2016.
