= Don Geronimo =

American radio personality

- Born: Michael L. Sorce; September 18, 1958 (age 68)
- Spouses: Freda Wright-Sorce (m. 1981; died 2005) Janet Sorce (m. 2009)
- Children: 2
- Presenting career
- Show: The Don Geronimo Show
- Stations: http://pod-god.com / Sacramento, CA
- Network: https://dongeronimopodcast.com
- Country: US
- Previous show: Don and Mike Show

Michael L. Sorce (born September 18, 1958), better known by his stage name Don Geronimo, is an American radio personality formerly featured on the nationally syndicated radio talk show Don and Mike Show.

== Career ==
Geronimo began his career in radio at the age of 13 when he went to work at Rockville, Maryland AM station WINX (now WLXE, a Spanish-language music station). He continued working at a variety of local stations, being fired at each for lacking the required FCC broadcaster's license, before forging a license. Geronimo landed what was then his dream job at WLS-FM in Chicago, Illinois in the early 1980s. He then moved to WBBM-FM (B96) to do the evening show. Eventually, he replaced Dick Biondi doing morning drive at the same station.

Geronimo returned to the Washington, D.C. area in 1985, doing afternoons at WAVA-FM. He moved to mornings in 1986, replacing Charlie & Harrigan. His partnership with Mike O'Meara, co-host of the Don and Mike Show, was forged at WAVA. Their show moved to WJFK-FM in 1991.

Washington Post radio reporter Marc Fisher features Geronimo in his book Something in the Air, on the rise and fall of radio in the United States. Fisher also conducted an interview with Geronimo prior to his first of three retirements, the first from The Don & Mike Show in 2008, during which Don spoke out about his frustration with the direction radio has taken following high profile decency events such as the Janet Jackson Super Bowl incident.

After only two months in retirement, Geronimo announced that he would return to the air on WOCM, a small, independently owned radio station in Ocean City, Maryland. Don Geronimo's Rockin' Soul Show featured popular music from the '70s and '80s. Geronimo described the show as "music that doesn't suck". After one month on the air at WOCM, Geronimo was fired from the station over creative differences. Don subsequently hosted a mid-morning talk show on WGMD (92.7 FM Rehoboth Beach, Delaware) from June 22, 2009 to October 13, 2009, when he retired for his second time, although he did some fill-in work at Classic Hits WCBS-FM in New York a few days in late November and December 2009.

Don Geronimo was named midday host of 1140 The Fan 1140 KHTK (AM), Sacramento effective on Monday, June 21, 2010. The four-hour program was scheduled Monday through Friday, noon to 4 pm local time. On January 27, Geronimo announced that he would be a regular on the TV show Good Day Sacramento, with his first appearance on February 14, 2011. On May 9, 2011, Geronimo announced that his contract with CBS was extended through 2014 and he was named Program Director for 1140 The Fan KHTK. As of July 11, 2011, Geronimo's show moved to the morning drive, 5:30–10 am local time after the "Rise Guys" left for a gig in San Francisco. At the same time, Don also ended his in-studio presence on Good Day Sacramento. He now occasionally contributes to GDS remotely via camera. On July 8, 2013, Geronimo's show moved to the midday slot on KHTK.

On Friday, October 4, 2013, The Don Geronimo Show was replaced by the Jason Ross show on CBS Sports Radio 1140 KHTK. A caller asked what happened, and Jason Ross simply explained, "CBS Sports Radio decided to go in another direction, which is sports. Don Geronimo is still employed by CBS Sports Radio." On October 16, 2013, Don went on the air on KHTK in Sacramento to thank those who supported him during his time in Sacramento. He said he was going to be doing a new project with CBS in the near future and it would be announced via his Twitter feed. On October 23, Don appeared on 106.7 The Fan's Lavar and Dukes show to announce his return to the station after five years, where he would appear weekdays from 7–10 p.m. local time, Saturdays from 9 a.m.–noon local time, and during Washington Redskins pre/post-game shows as well. On March 1, 2014, Geronimo stated that he would no longer be heard on WJFK anymore. He announced on his Twitter feed that "No one should be shocked I'm not in the plans for CBS/DC. I had opined recently on air how I didn't understand the logic. Now 30 more days."

On September 10, 2021, iHeartMedia announced that Sorce would host The Don Geronimo Show on WBIG in Washington D.C., starting September 23, 2021. The show aired during the 5:30am-10am drive-time slot. Geronimo was fired from WBIG on July 29, 2023 for making disparaging comments on the air about a female reporter at WUSA.

=== Radio history ===
Don has worked at the following stations:

Number	Date	Station	City
1	1973	WRWC	Rockton, IL
2	1974	WGEZ	Beloit, WI
3	1974	WYFE	Rockford, IL
4	1974	WNAM	Oshkosh, WI
5	1975	WOKY	Milwaukee, WI
6	1975	WROK (AM)	Rockford, IL
7	1976	WSPT	Stevens Point, WI
8	1976	WKTQ "13Q"	Pittsburgh, PA
9	1977	WXLO "99X"	New York City, NY
10	1978	WGBF	Evansville, IN
11	1978	WCAO	Baltimore, MD
12	1978	WWDC	Washington, DC
13	1978	WPRO-FM	Providence, RI
14	1980	WNDE	Indianapolis, IN
15	1980	WZPL (Then called "Kiss 99")	Indianapolis, IN
16		WDRQ	Detroit, MI
17	1979 - 1981	WPGC	Washington, DC
18	1982	KIIS-FM	Los Angeles, CA
19	1982	KFI	Los Angeles, CA
20	1982	WLS-FM	Chicago, IL
21		WBZZ "B94"	Pittsburgh, PA
22		WBBM-FM "B96"	Chicago, IL
23	March 1985–June 1991	WAVA-FM	Washington, DC
24	October 1991–April 2008; October 24, 2013–February 26, 2014	WJFK-FM	Washington, DC.
25	July 7, 2008–August 2008	WOCM	Ocean City, MD
26	June 22, 2009–October 13, 2009	WGMD	Rehoboth Beach, DE.
27	June 2010–October 3, 2013	KHTK	Sacramento, CA
28	April 2014	RELM	Sacramento, CA
29	August 2014 - September 2019	http://pod-god.com	Sacramento, CA
30	November 2021 - July 2023	WBIG-FM	Rockville, MD

Geronimo first appeared on air part-time on WINX in Rockville, Maryland in 1971.

In November and December 2009, Geronimo filled shifts on WCBS-FM in New York City.

=== Acting ===
Don has appeared in The Adventures of Brisco County, Jr., Babylon 5 and The King of Queens. He is a member of the Screen Actors Guild. He has stated on several occasions on the Don and Mike Show that he and his partner at that time, Mike O'Meara, spoke without authorization during their Babylon 5 taping, which was supposed to have been a non-speaking role for each. Rather than re-shoot the scene, the show's producers arranged for their union memberships. This paved the way for a speaking role on The King of Queens, where he spoke one line, "Lookin' good, Heffernan!" He has also co-hosted with Marty Bass post-game coverage of the Baltimore Ravens games for WJZ-TV (Channel 13).

== Personal life ==
=== Family ===
Don's first wife, Freda, died on July 10, 2005, in an automobile accident on Maryland Route 90 near Ocean City, Maryland, where the Sorces had their vacation home. Freda was a frequent contributor to the Don and Mike Show and her spirited interaction with Don was an integral part of the program. Following her death, Don took a hiatus from the show until August 1, 2005, when he returned to the air with an emotional solo broadcast.

Don married Janet Sorce on March 21, 2009, and has one son (Bart Sorce) and one daughter (Amy) from previous marriages.

On Friday, October 22, 2010, during the Don Geronimo live stage show Don slipped and fell off the stage. Don suffered head trauma and was admitted to a local hospital and later transferred to ICU.

=== Controversy ===
In 1994, Geronimo and his then radio partner Mike O'Meara were sued for $35 million by an anonymous University of Maryland student who claimed the pair had violated her privacy and inflicted emotional distress.

=== Retirements and returns ===
On February 4, 2008, Don announced his retirement from his radio show to pursue his personal life for a while. His last appearance on the Don and Mike Show was Friday, April 11, 2008, with Mike O'Meara to continue the show after that (as the Mike O'Meara Show). Don was widely expected to return to radio in some form in the future.

After only two months in retirement, Geronimo announced that he would return to the air on WOCM, a small, independently owned radio station in Ocean City, Maryland. Don Geronimo's Rockin' Soul Show aired weekdays from 1 pm – 3pm featuring popular music from the 1970s and 1980s. After four weeks, Geronimo left the station.

In May 2010, Geronimo announced that, beginning June 21, he would be returning to 1140 KHTK—a station which had formerly syndicated the Don and Mike Show—to host a mid-day show. On Friday, October 4, 2013, this new Don Geronimo Show was replaced on KHTK by The Jason Ross Show. Geronimo returned to the airwaves several days later to explain that KHTK decided to go with all sports programming, but that he would return to a CBS Radio station elsewhere soon.

Don Geronimo returned once again to the Washington, D.C., airwaves on WJFK-FM on October 24, 2013. His sports-oriented show aired weekdays from 7:00 to 10:00 pm and on Saturdays from 9:00 am to noon. Initially, he broadcast the show from a studio at CBS Radio's main building in Sacramento, then later from a studio at his Sacramento home when CBS internal politics prevented the show from being broadcast at the company’s building any longer. Co-hosts for the show were located at WJFK’s home studios in Lanham, Maryland. While it was intended that Geronimo would eventually move to the Washington area to do the show live at WJFK's studios, this never materialized after frequent preemptions and schedule changes. On March 1, 2014, Geronimo announced on Twitter he would no longer be heard on WJFK; The show he had broadcast on February 26, 2014, ended up being his last at WJFK.

On April 1, 2014, Geronimo began broadcasting a live podcast, also titled The Don Geronimo Show, weekdays on the RELM Network. The show was a commercial-free, uncensored, subscription-based podcast that listeners could stream live or download for offline listening. Geronimo described the show on Twitter as, “the show I always wanted to do.” The final broadcast of that incarnation of The Don Geronimo Show aired September 13, 2019, with Geronimo declaring a hiatus to allow him to work on other projects.

On November 16, 2021, The Don Geronimo Show began broadcasting during the 5:30-10:00 am drive time slot at suburban Washington, D.C., classic rock station WBIG-FM, an iHeartMedia affiliate in Rockville, Maryland, located only two miles from the station where he began his radio career at age 13. However, WBIG fired Geronimo in July 2023, after he made sexist comments towards WUSA9 sports reporter Sharla McBride while broadcasting from Washington Commanders training camp.
