= The Crime Files of Flamond =

US radio crime drama

- Other names: Crime Files of Flamond
- Genre: Crime drama
- Running time: 30 minutes
- Country of origin: United States
- Language: English
- Home station: WGN
- Syndicates: Mutual
- Starring: Everett Clarke
- Announcer: Bob Cunningham
- Written by: George Anderson
- Directed by: Myron Golden
- Produced by: W. B. Lewis
- Original release: 1944 – February 27, 1957
- Sponsored by: Peter Hand Brewery (1944– 1946); Brach's (1946–1948)

The Crime Files of Flamond was a radio crime drama in the United States. From 1946 to 1948 it was broadcast on WGN and syndicated to other stations by transcriptions. From January 7, 1953, to July 1, 1953, it was carried on the Mutual Broadcasting System. Mutual revived the program On April 4, 1956, and ran it until February 27, 1957.

== Format ==
The title character (identified by only the single name "Flamond") was described as a psychologist who "bypasses ballistics for brain-power." A 1947, article in Radio Mirror magazine said: "Flamond's adventures are not the rough-and-tumble, machine-gun blast, sock-'em-in-the-jaw type of drama. Most of his clients are average citizens who seek his aid in solving their problems."

Sandra Lake, Flamond's secretary, played an integral part in each episode, relating information as she typed a card that summarized aspects of that episode's case.

== Personnel ==
Mike Wallace (then billed as Myron Wallace) played the title role during the program's syndicated run. Everette Clarke portrayed Flamond in the episodes that were broadcast on Mutual. Sandra Lake was played by Patricia Dunlap in syndication and by Muriel Bremner on Mutual. Actors heard in supporting roles included Maurice Copeland, Harry Elders, and Ben Copeland. Bob Cunningham was the announcer.

The writer was George Anderson. Myron Golden was the director, and W. B. Lewis was the producer.

== Sponsors ==
The series was sponsored by Peter Hand Brewery (for Meister Brau beer) from 1944 to 1946 and by Brach's candy from 1946 to 1948.

== See also ==
- Crime Doctor
