= Dude Walker =

American voice-over talent and actor

Dude Walker is an American voice-over talent and actor based in New York City. He is known for his voice-over work in video games, movies, TV shows, and radio.

== Filmography ==
=== Television series ===
- Dead Silent - Himself - Narrator
- House of Cards - Presiding Officer
- The West Wing - Simon
- The High Court with Doug Benson - Narrator
- Celebrity Watch Party - Narrator
- Cold Case Files: Dead West - Narrator

=== Shorts ===
- Unrequited - Bob Hendry

=== Movies ===
- Minority Report - Reporter

=== Video games ===
- Grand Theft Auto: Episodes from Liberty City - Ram Jam FM Imaging
- Heroes of Newerth - Odin Allfather
- Star Wars: The Old Republic - Ardun Kothe, Security Officer Stansun, Additional Voices
- Star Wars: The Old Republic - Shadow of Revan - Ardun Kothe, Additional Voices
- The Elder Scrolls III: Morrowind

=== Documentary ===
- China... Thru' My Eyes!
- Dead Harvest - Dead Harvest Narrator
- Space Voyages - Himself - Narrator
- Undateable
