= KCJJ =

Hot adult contemporary radio station in Iowa City, Iowa

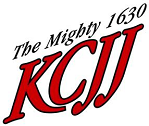
- Iowa City; United States
- Broadcast area: Eastern Iowa
- Frequency: 1630 kHz
- Branding: The Mighty 1630 KCJJ

Programming
- Language: English
- Format: Full service radio; hot adult contemporary
- Affiliations: ABC News; Motor Racing Network; Performance Racing Network; United Stations Radio Networks

Ownership
- Owner: Stephen Soboroff; (River City Radio, Inc.)

History
- First air date: January 15, 1977
- Former frequencies: 1560 kHz (1977–1997)

Technical information
- Licensing authority: FCC
- Facility ID: 87115
- Class: B
- Power: 10,000 watts (day); 1,000 watts (night)
- Transmitter coordinates: 41°36′3″N 91°30′4″W

Links
- Public license information: Public file; LMS
- Webcast: Listen live
- Website: www.1630kcjj.com

KCJJ (1630 kHz, "The Mighty 1630") is a radio station licensed to Iowa City, Iowa. The station is owned by Stephen Soboroff's (Steve Bridges) River City Radio, Inc.

KCJJ broadcasts with 10,000 watts during the day and 1,000 watts at night. It can be heard throughout Eastern Iowa during the day and in many states in the central and eastern United States at night. KCJJ streams on its website and through TuneIn and the KCJJ app. In studio shows are streamed on YouTube.

== Programming ==
KCJJ has a full service format with hot adult contemporary music. The Morning Show is hosted by "Captain" Steve Bridges, Jim Hunter, Tom Suter, and Pat Harty. Middays are handled by Tommy Lang, and Nights by Molly Suter. Weekends include Tom and Liam Heath. Local News is aired hourly and High School Sports are featured nightly. KCJJ is affiliated with ABC and CNN. The station airs weathercasts from Severestudios.com, the syndicated Lex and Terry Show, and NASCAR auto racing.

== History ==
KCJJ originated as an application for a new station on 1560 kHz in Iowa City, which was filed in 1971, but was not issued a construction permit until 1976. The station began regular broadcasting on January 15, 1977.

=== Expanded Band assignment ===
On March 17, 1997, the Federal Communications Commission (FCC) announced that 88 stations had been given permission to move to newly available "Expanded Band" transmitting frequencies, ranging from 1610 to 1700 kHz, with KCJJ authorized to move from 1560 kHz to 1630 kHz. A construction permit for the expanded band station was assigned the call sign KCJK on November 10, 1997. The two stations swapped call signs on October 3, 1998, with AM 1560 changing from KCJJ to KCJK, and AM 1630 changing from KCJK to KCJJ.

FCC policy provided that original stations and their expanded band twins could operate simultaneously for up to five years, after which owners would have to turn in one of the two licenses. It was decided to transfer full operations to the expanded band station, and on May 7, 2002, the license for the original station on 1560 kHz (KCJK) was cancelled, with AM 1630 continuing as KCJJ.
