= Don and Mike Show =

American national radio talk show

- Don and Mike Show logo
- Genre: Talk
- Running time: 4 hours
- Country of origin: United States
- Language: English
- Home station: WJFK-FM
- Syndicates: 26 affiliates
- Starring: Don Geronimo and Mike O'Meara
- Announcer: Dude Walker
- Created by: Don Geronimo and Mike O'Meara
- Produced by: John Nolan, Frank Murphy, Diana Silman, Charles Broyhill, Lisa Herndon, John Normand, BethAnn McBride, Robb Spewak
- Original release: December 11, 1985 – April 11, 2008

The Don and Mike Show was an American nationally syndicated radio talk show hosted by the shock jocks Don Geronimo and Mike O'Meara, which aired from December 1985 through April 11, 2008. The show debuted on WAVA-FM in 1985 as The Morning Zoo with Don and Mike. The official name of the show became The Don and Mike Show when the duo moved to WJFK-FM in 1991. In the later years, the show was carried on 20–30 stations across the United States by the CBS-owned Westwood One Radio Network. The show's flagship station was 106.7 WJFK-FM in Washington, D.C. In 2007 the show ranked #66 in the Talkers Magazine Heavy 100. Geronimo retired in 2008. The show's last live regular episode with Geronimo was broadcast March 13, 2008 and Geronimo hosted a farewell show April 11, 2008. After Geronimo's retirement, the remaining cast members formed the Mike O'Meara Show.

== Personalities ==
The show was co-hosted by O'Meara and Geronimo. News briefs and occasional commentary were provided by Buzz Burbank. The show was most recently produced by former show intern Robb Spewak. Phone calls were screened by Joe Ardinger .

The show included four news reporters over the course of its run. David Haines (1985–1989), the program's original newsman, died on July 10, 2005 Laurie Neff was the second newsperson.

Geronimo announced on February 4, 2008, that he would leave the show on May 30. That date was moved up to April 11, 2008, in a surprise announcement from the WJFK program director which also included the return of Beth Ann McBride as producer. The show was then known as The Mike O'Meara Show. It continued along with a similar format, minus Don, up until July 2009 when the show was cancelled following the decision to turn WJFK into a sports talk station. Westwood One also continued to syndicate the show in its new lineup up until its cancellation. The Mike O'Meara Show took a 5-month hiatus and returned as a daily podcast in December. Don Geronimo broadcast out of Washington D.C. WJFK 106.7 The Fan for a brief stint in 2013. In April 2014, Geronimo joined former D&M partner Buzz Burbank's RELM Network to host his own podcast, The Don Geronimo Show, lasting only four months, citing RELM did not pay him. Burbank denied the claim, saying Geronimo "was paid every penny he was owed to that point".

Geronimo now hosts and owns his own show.
