= Mr. Man (website) =

Website featuring male nudity

- Website type: Internet pornography
- Available in: English
- Website: www.mrman.com
- Registration: Optional (previews only)
- Launched: October 2013

Mr. Man is a website that specializes in locating, rating, and posting instances of male nudity in film and television. The site is a spin-off from the popular site Mr. Skin and went live in October 2013.

== History ==
Launched 14 years after its parent site, Mr. Man was designed as a "Mr. Skin for Women," although in the first month following its launch, nearly 80% of their paid memberships were from gay males rather than women. Nevertheless, the site has grown in popularity with women since then, and as of May, 2014, the ratio was closer to 60% gay men and 40% women. The site is primarily an entertainment website, compared with a pornographic one because it contains content from mainstream movies and television, and also combines the male nudity with "Mr. Skin’s signature brand of bawdy, boisterous comedy".

Site founder Jim McBride promoted the site heavily during his appearance in February 2014 appearance SiriusXM's The Howard Stern Show. He has also promoted it on his numerous other radio appearances on such shows as Lex and Terry, The Bob & Tom Show, "Heidi and Frank", "Jarrett, Harry, and Spike: The Game 87.7 FM Chicago", "Drew Lane: Detroit Sports 105.1", "Paul and Young Ron", "The Mike Calta Show", and "Roger and JP: WBAB Long Island".
