= The Rude Awakening Show =

Radio talk show

The Rude Awakening Show is a United States morning radio talk show that airs from 6am until 10am weekdays on WOCM, a radio station based in Ocean City, Maryland. The show is simulcast via IRIE Radio. It is hosted by Chicago-born radio personality David "Bulldog" Rothner. It premiered on WOCM on January 10, 2005 after a six-year run on St. Maarten radio station Laser 101, one of the four stations of the Philipsburg Broadcasting radio network The show is broadcast from above Seacrets, a bar, restaurant, and nightclub located in Ocean City. Because of its location on the Delmarva peninsula the show can be heard in four states: Maryland, Delaware, Virginia and New Jersey.

== Overview ==
The show features a variety of guest interviews from celebrities to politicians, musicians to athletes, psychics to porn stars, doctors and artists. The show also has regular features from adult webmaster Mr. Skin and Drew Curtis from Fark.com. For local listeners, the show features daily surf reports from Lee at Malibu's Surf Shop.

The cast of the show has varied since its premiere. In addition to Bulldog, the show currently features:

- "Coach", enough said.
- "The Dude", he's the cool guy.
- "Marla", Producer & Phone Screener Extraordinaire.
- Leighton Moore, station owner.
