= WOCM =

Radio station in Ocean City, Maryland

- Selbyville, Delaware; United States
- Broadcast area: Ocean City, Maryland
- Frequency: 98.1 MHz
- Branding: Ocean 98

Programming
- Format: Adult Album Alternative

Ownership
- Owner: Irie Radio

History
- First air date: 1965
- Former call signs: WSBL
- Call sign meaning: We are Ocean City Maryland

Technical information
- Facility ID: 2200
- Class: A
- ERP: 3,000 watts
- HAAT: 143.0 meters
- Transmitter coordinates: 38°25′20″N 75°8′23″W

Links
- Website: irieradio.com

WOCM (98.1 FM, "Ocean 98") is an AAA/Rock radio station in the Ocean City, Maryland, area.

The radio station's studios are located at Seacrets, a massive restaurant and nightclub campus located along Assawoman Bay in Ocean City. The station features an eclectic mix of rock, reggae, and other modern hits, in a format not unlike a college radio station.

WOCM was one of the nation's first independent radio stations to broadcast over the Internet a live video feed of its jocks and visiting musical performers from its website.

WOCM Studios at Seacrets, Jamaica USA (Ocean City, MD)

== History ==
WOCM is owned by Leighton Moore, who founded Seacrets in 1988, and is managed by David "Bulldog" Rothner, host of the station's "Rude Awakening Morning Show."

This station originally signed on the air at 97.9 FM with the call letters WSBL (Selbyville) and featured a country music format.

National talk radio personality Don Geronimo briefly hosted "Don Geronimo's Rockin' Soul Show" on WOCM, after having retired from the syndicated Don and Mike Show. The notoriously brusque deejay was fired by Rothner after a month on the air.
