= Ron Kershaw =

American television news reporter and director (1943–1988)

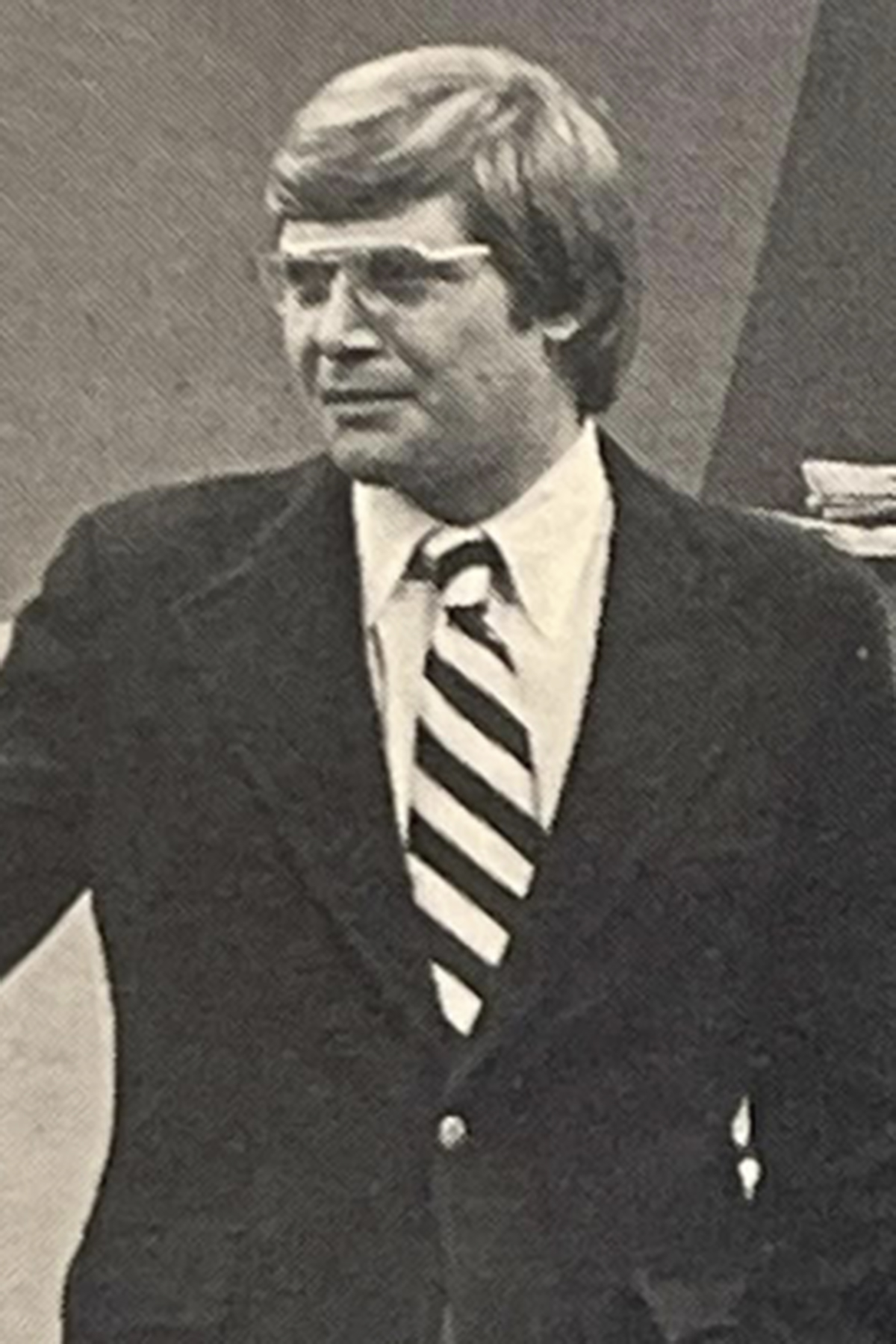
- Born: August 19, 1943; North Carolina, US
- Died: July 3, 1988 (aged 44); Chicago, Illinois, US
- Occupation(s): television news director, reporter
- Years active: 1974-1988
- Known for: Action News

Ron Kershaw (August 19, 1943 – July 3, 1988) was an American television news reporter. Kershaw was the news director in several U.S. markets, including New York City, Chicago and Baltimore.

== Early life ==
Kershaw grew up in Hendersonville, North Carolina, and later moved to Arizona where he attended Glendale Community College. From 1961 to 1969 he served in the United States Air Force.

== News director ==
In 1974, Kershaw was hired by WBAL-TV in Baltimore to shore up its sagging news ratings. He introduced the Action News format, hired new talent, such as Mike Hambrick And Ron Smith and moved the station from last to first in less than a year. Sue Simmons and Spencer Christian were also among Kershaw's protégés.

In 1979, Kershaw moved on to WNBC-TV in New York, where he collaborated with Peter Sang in bringing the "control room" set into TV news, taking the station from last in the ratings to a market leader in two years. Kershaw was also mentor to Bucky Gunts, who worked for Kershaw in Baltimore and Chicago. In 1982, Kershaw NBC promoted Kershaw to be the program producer of NBC Sports.

== Personal life and death ==
While in Houston, Kershaw had been dating Jessica Savitch, a news reporter with a rival television station in Texas. Kershaw helped Savitch develop her reporting skills during their stormy ten-year relationship. The relationship was depicted in the made-for-television movie: Almost Golden, about Savitch's life.

In 1987, Kershaw met Giselle Fernandez, whom he had hired as a reporter at WBBM-TV. They were engaged to be married when Kershaw died of pancreatic and liver cancer on July 3, 1988, at age 44. Kershaw is survived by a daughter, Lee Ann and a son, Beau Kershaw, an award-winning photojournalist, who once worked at Kershaw's old station, WBAL-TV in Baltimore. Young Kershaw's awards include an Emmy Award three Emmy nominations, a Grantham Prize and the duPont-Columbia silver baton.
