= South Milwaukee, Wisconsin =

- City
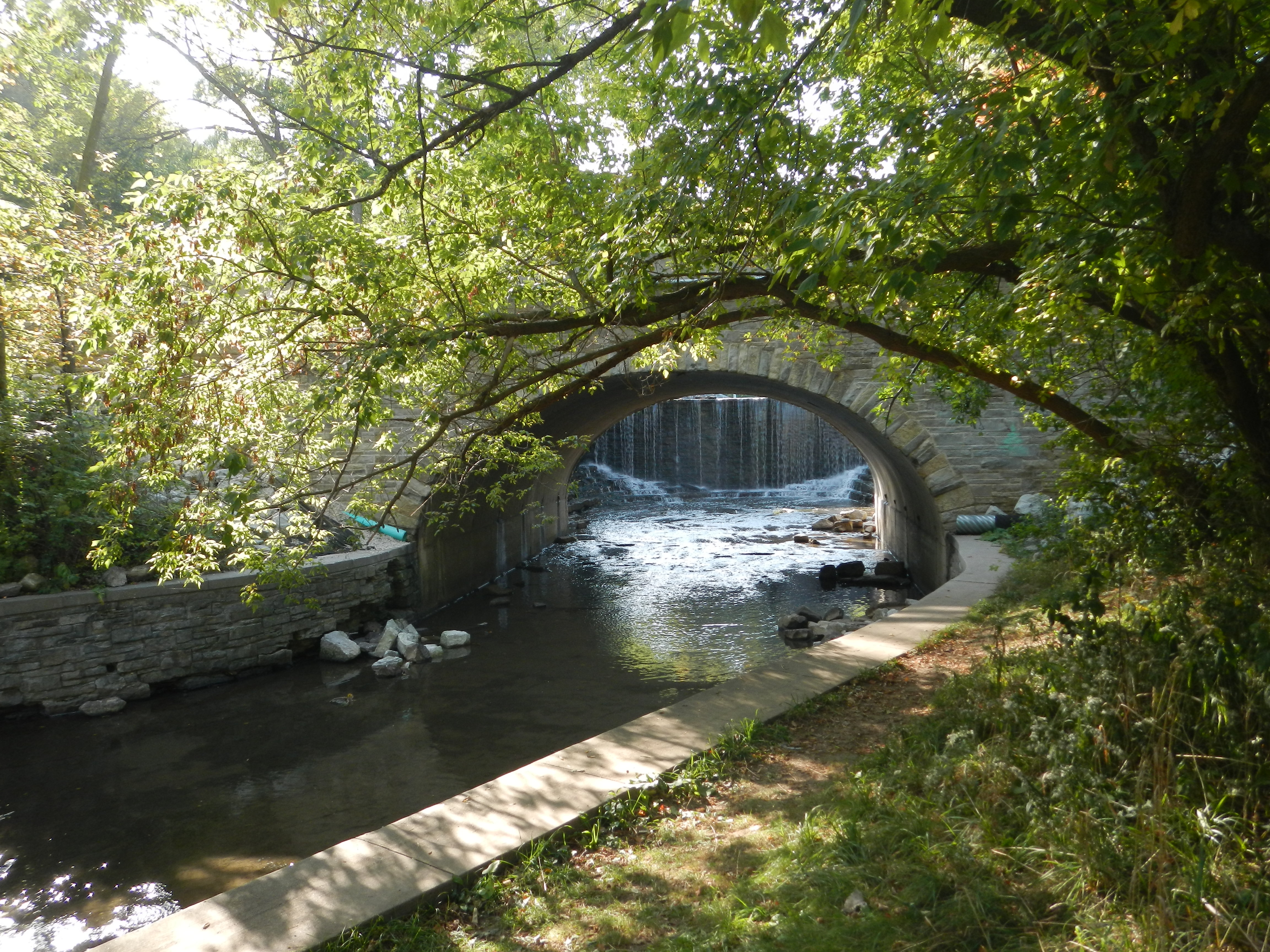
- Oak Creek Parkway
- Motto: Proud past. Promising future.
- Interactive map of South Milwaukee, Wisconsin
- Location within Wisconsin Location within the United States
- Coordinates: 42°54′40″N 87°51′51″W
- Country: United States
- State: Wisconsin
- County: Milwaukee

Area
  - Total: 4.84 sq mi (12.53 km^{2})
  - Land: 4.83 sq mi (12.51 km^{2})
  - Water: 0.0077 sq mi (0.02 km^{2})
- Elevation: 669 ft (204 m)

Population (2020)
  - Total: 20,795
  - Estimate (2021): 20,517
  - Density: 4,286.1/sq mi (1,654.89/km^{2})
- Time zone: UTC−6 (Central (CST))
  - Summer (DST): UTC−5 (CDT)
- ZIP code: 53172, 53175
- Area code: 414
- FIPS code: 55-75125
- GNIS feature ID: 1574469
- Website: southmilwaukee.gov

South Milwaukee is a city in Milwaukee County, Wisconsin, United States. The population was 20,795 at the 2020 census. Situated on the western shore of Lake Michigan, South Milwaukee developed as a streetcar suburb located 5 miles (8.0 km) south of Milwaukee.

== History ==
South Milwaukee was laid out in 1891 by the South Milwaukee company within the Town of Oak Creek, with the purpose of serving as a rival industrial suburb of the City of Milwaukee, and was named from its location south of Milwaukee. South Milwaukee was incorporated as a village in 1892, then as a city in 1897. South Milwaukee has a rich immigrant history, as immigrants from England and Germany made up a large portion of the population in the early 1900s.

== Geography ==
South Milwaukee is located at 42°54′40″N 87°51′51″W (42.911016, −87.864030).

According to the United States Census Bureau, the city has a total area of 4.81 square miles (12.46 km^{2}), of which 4.80 square miles (12.43 km^{2}) is land and 0.01 square miles (0.03 km^{2}) is water.

== Demographics ==
Historical population
Census	Pop.	Note	%±
1900	3,392		—
1910	6,092		79.6%
1920	7,598		24.7%
1930	10,706		40.9%
1940	11,134		4.0%
1950	12,855		15.5%
1960	20,307		58.0%
1970	23,297		14.7%
1980	21,069		−9.6%
1990	20,958		−0.5%
2000	21,256		1.4%
2010	21,156		−0.5%
2020	20,795		−1.7%
2025 (est.)	20,517		−1.3%
U.S. Decennial Census

=== 2020 census ===
As of the 2020 census, South Milwaukee had a population of 20,795 and included 4,429 families. The median age was 41.4 years. 20.7% of residents were under the age of 18, 7.4% were from 18 to 24, 26.2% were from 25 to 44, 27.3% were from 45 to 64, and 18.4% were 65 years of age or older. 49.3% of residents were male and 50.7% were female. For every 100 females there were 97.3 males, and for every 100 females age 18 and over there were 96.3 males age 18 and over.

99.8% of residents lived in urban areas, while 0.2% lived in rural areas.

There were 9,039 households in South Milwaukee, of which 25.9% had children under the age of 18 living in them. Of all households, 40.7% were married-couple households, 22.4% were households with a male householder and no spouse or partner present, and 28.6% were households with a female householder and no spouse or partner present. About 34.1% of all households were made up of individuals, 30.8% had one or more people aged 65 or older, and 14.2% had someone living alone who was 65 years of age or older.

There were 9,588 housing units, of which 5.7% were vacant. The homeowner vacancy rate was 1.0% and the rental vacancy rate was 5.0%.

Racial composition as of the 2020 census
Race	Number	Percent
White	16,885	81.2%
Black or African American	759	3.6%
American Indian and Alaska Native	186	0.9%
Asian	331	1.6%
Native Hawaiian and Other Pacific Islander	4	0.0%
Some other race	795	3.8%
Two or more races	1,835	8.8%
Hispanic or Latino (of any race)	2,704	13.0%

=== 2010 census ===
As of the census of 2010, there were 21,156 people, 9,043 households, and 5,475 families living in the city. The population density was 4,407.5 inhabitants per square mile (1,701.7/km^{2}). There were 9,722 housing units at an average density of 2,025.4 per square mile (782.0/km^{2}). The racial makeup of the city was 91.6% White, 2.0% African American, 0.8% Native American, 1.1% Asian, 2.1% from other races, and 2.2% from two or more races. Hispanic or Latino of any race were 8.0% of the population.

There were 9,043 households, of which 28.5% had children under the age of 18 living with them, 43.3% were married couples living together, 11.9% had a female householder with no husband present, 5.4% had a male householder with no wife present, and 39.5% were non-families. 32.8% of all households were made up of individuals, and 12.7% had someone living alone who was 65 years of age or older. The average household size was 2.31 and the average family size was 2.93.

The median age in the city was 40.3 years. 21.8% of residents were under the age of 18; 8.4% were between the ages of 18 and 24; 26% were from 25 to 44; 28.1% were from 45 to 64; and 15.6% were 65 years of age or older. The gender makeup of the city was 49.0% male and 51.0% female.

=== 2000 census ===
As of the census of 2000, there were 21,256 people, 8,694 households, and 5,616 families living in the city. The population density was 4,447.5 people per square mile (1,716.9/km^{2}). There were 9,122 housing units at an average density of 1,908.6 per square mile (736.8/km^{2}). The racial makeup of the city was 94.81% White, 1.04% African American, 0.58% Native American, 0.69% Asian, 0.04% Pacific Islander, 1.36% from other races, and 1.47% from two or more races. Hispanic or Latino of any race were 4.01% of the population.

There were 8,694 households, out of which 30.2% had children under the age of 18 living with them, 49.8% were married couples living together, 10.7% had a female householder with no husband present, and 35.4% were non-families. 30.1% of all households were made up of individuals, and 11.2% had someone living alone who was 65 years of age or older. The average household size was 2.40 and the average family size was 3.00.

In the city, the population was spread out, with 23.9% under the age of 18, 8.0% from 18 to 24, 30.3% from 25 to 44, 21.1% from 45 to 64, and 16.6% who were 65 years of age or older. The median age was 38 years. For every 100 females, there were 94.5 males. For every 100 females age 18 and over, there were 91.9 males.

The median income for a household in the city was $44,197, and the median income for a family was $54,474. Males had a median income of $38,146 versus $27,121 for females. The per capita income for the city was $20,925. About 4.5% of families and 6.0% of the population were below the poverty line, including 7.5% of those under age 18 and 6.6% of those age 65 or over.

== Economy ==
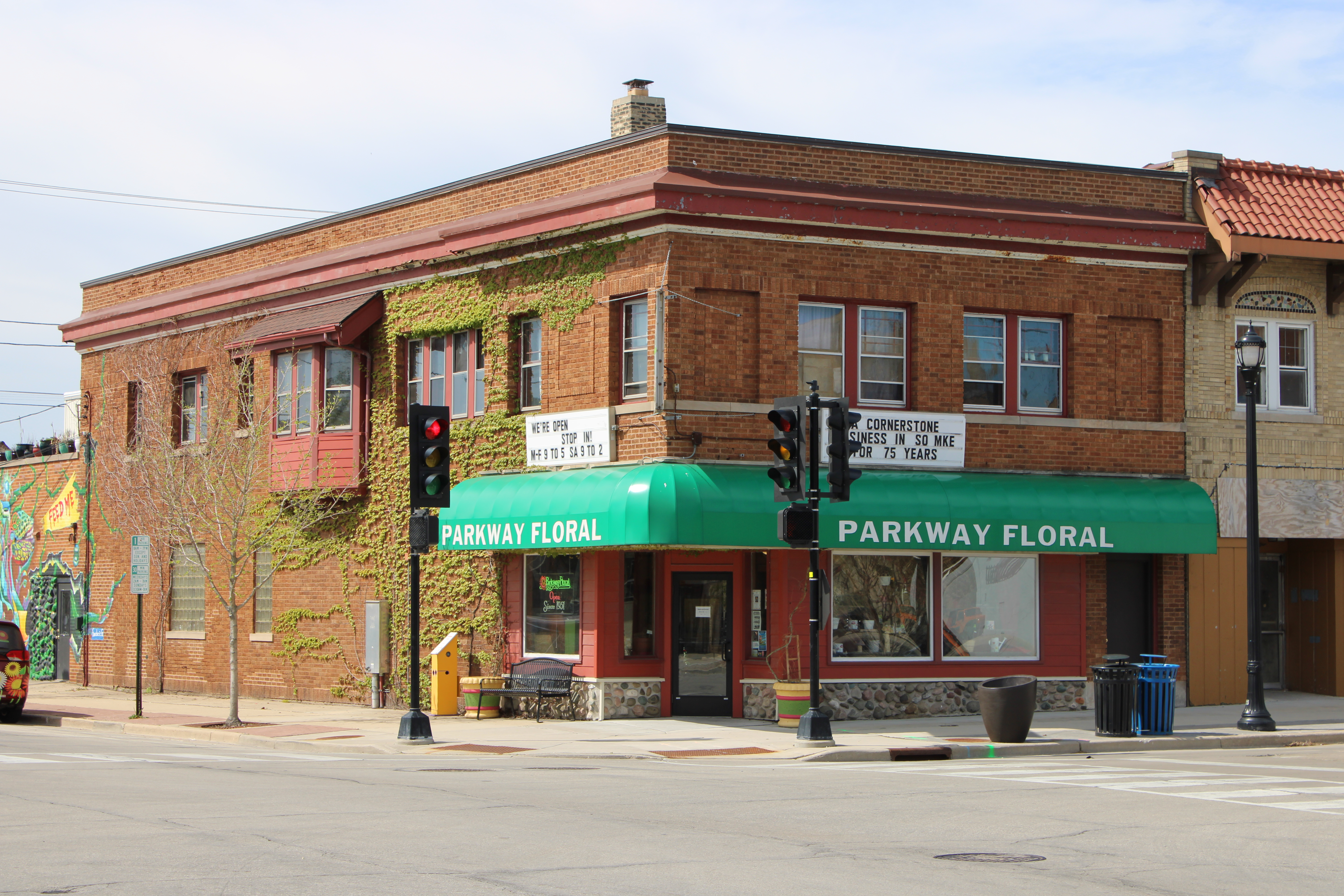
Parkway Floral in downtown South Milwaukee

South Milwaukee was the headquarters of Bucyrus International, formerly Bucyrus-Erie, which is known for constructing large shovels and dragline excavators, including Big Muskie, the world's largest mobile earth-moving machine. Bucyrus shovels were used in the construction of the Panama Canal.

In November 2012 Caterpillar Mining bought Bucyrus International for $8.6 billion and will make a goal to become a "one-stop shop" for mining companies worldwide.

Grant Park South Milwaukee WI

== Parks and recreation ==
Within South Milwaukee's borders is Grant Park, part of the Milwaukee County Park System. Grant Park features the Oak Leaf Bike trail, tennis courts, a swimming beach, an 18-hole golf course and the Seven Bridges Hiking Trail along the shore of Lake Michigan.

In 2005, the South Milwaukee Performing Arts Center was built adjacent to the new South Milwaukee High School. This Performing Arts Center, which is open to the public, hosts a variety of entertainment.

== Transportation ==
The city lies on the southern end of Milwaukee County Transit System Route 15.

South Milwaukee was served by passenger rail until 1971, via the South Milwaukee Passenger Station. Today, the former depot is listed on the National Register of Historic Places. Freight railroad services are provided by the Union Pacific Railroad.

== Notable people ==
- William P. Atkinson, member of the Wisconsin State Assembly
- Greg Brower, member of the Nevada State Senate and former U.S. Attorney, born in South Milwaukee
- Jerry Dreva, avant-garde artist and leader of 1970s glam-rock group Les Petite Bon Bons
- John W. Grobschmidt, member of the Wisconsin State Assembly
- Richard Grobschmidt, member of the Wisconsin State Assembly and Wisconsin State Senate, lived in South Milwaukee, graduated from South Milwaukee High School
- Roger Sherman Hoar, Massachusetts State Senator and author who lived in South Milwaukee
- Jackie Kashian, comedian born in South Milwaukee and graduated from South Milwaukee High School
- Reginald Lisowski, American professional wrestler, better known by his ring name, "The Crusher"
- Kurt Nimphius, NBA player born in South Milwaukee and graduated from South Milwaukee High School
- Jeff Plale, Wisconsin Railroad Commissioner and former legislator
- Phil Sobocinski, NFL player, was born in South Milwaukee
- George Sokolowski, Wisconsin State Representative, was born in South Milwaukee
- Gary George Wetzel, Medal of Honor recipient, was born in South Milwaukee
- Chester Yorton, former Mr. America and Mr. Universe, grew up in South Milwaukee
- Chuck Zehner, former host of the PBS series Tracks Ahead, lived in South Milwaukee
