= Chuck Zehner =

Chuck Zehner (January 9, 1942 – December 2, 2000) was the producer and host of the PBS/Milwaukee Public Television series Tracks Ahead. He hosted the show from 1990 to 2000. He died on December 2, 2000, of a heart attack in South Milwaukee, Wisconsin. After his death, Spencer Christian took over and is the current host of Tracks Ahead.

== Tracks Ahead ==
At the dawn of cable television, Zehner, a Milwaukee train enthusiast, began producing and hosting the interview format show Just Trains on Milwaukee's local access channel on Viacom Cable. Eventually the show was picked up on the cable network around Milwaukee, After 72 shows Milwaukee's WMVS Channel 10 (PBS) agreed to air a new magazine format show On Track in the Milwaukee market. For the second season it was renamed Tracks Ahead and expanded to the PBS network.
