= John Hambrick =

Broadcast journalist, actor and announcer

- Born: June 21, 1940; Conroe, Texas, US
- Died: September 10, 2013 (aged 73); Round Rock, Texas, US
- Occupations: Television news anchor, narrator, actor, announcer
- Years active: 1963–2000
- Children: 3
- Relatives: Judd Hambrick; Mike Hambrick

John James Hambrick (June 21, 1940 – September 10, 2013) was an American broadcast journalist, reporter, actor, voice over announcer and TV documentary producer.

== Career ==
=== Broadcast journalist ===
Hambrick began his television career in 1963 at KRBC-TV in Abilene, Texas; this was followed by stints as a reporter and anchor at KFDX-TV in Wichita Falls and KHOU-TV in Houston over the next two years. In 1966 he took an anchoring job at WCPO-TV in Cincinnati and, after less than two years there he was recruited by its sister station in Cleveland, WEWS, to become its main news anchor. With much fanfare on December 25, 1967, 27-year-old Hambrick made his Cleveland television debut on WEWS as anchor of the 7:00 and 11:00 P.M. newscasts, which included commentaries by Dorothy Fuldheim. A full promotional advertisement was printed in both The Plain Dealer and the Cleveland Press newspapers.

In 1970, Dave Patterson joined Hambrick as co-anchor, with Fuldheim continuing as commentator; they would help station's news broadcast maintain the position as Cleveland's top television news program in the local Nielsen ratings, to where it had risen during Hambrick's tenure. Hambrick then departed for KABC-TV in Los Angeles in September 1975, and Ted Henry joined Patterson as co-anchor.

After two years as news director and 5:00 and 11:00 P.M. co-anchor on KABC-TV, Hambrick moved on to anchor for three years at KRON-TV in San Francisco. In January 1980 he joined WNBC-TV in New York City as first a reporter and weekend anchor, then weeknight co-anchor alongside Chuck Scarborough for the next five years.

In spring 1985, WNBC-TV chose not to renew Hambrick's contract. He then was recruited by WTVJ in Miami to replace Ralph Renick, the station's original news anchor who retired in April of that year. Hambrick joined WTVJ in July 1985 and spent the next four years as 6:00 and 11:00 P.M. co-anchor. Hambrick then moved to crosstown rival WCIX (now WFOR-TV) at the start of 1990, remaining there until September 1993. His final television job was a brief stint at KBMT in Beaumont, Texas, around 1999.

=== The Florida Highwaymen (2002) ===
In 2002, Hambrick and his son Jack co-produced an hour-long PBS-TV documentary film about the Florida Highwaymen, a group of pioneering African-American Florida artists. The film, titled The Highwaymen: Florida's Outsider Artist, included interviews with a portion of the artists, their mentor, late renowned Florida landscape painter A.E. Backus, and more than 100 original Highwaymen paintings. The film was produced by their production company, Everglades Productions. Hambrick also served as the project's narrator.

=== Music ===
In 1972 Hambrick wrote and recorded a rock/country-western album, Windmill in a Jet Filled Sky, under the Brown Bag Records music label, while moonlighting at his job at WEWS in Cleveland. The album was largely overlooked by consumers, in spite of positive critical reviews. Hambrick never abandoned his full-time television career, but did not record any more music.

=== Supporting actor roles ===
Hambrick was a registered member of the Screen Actors Guild, and had supporting and/or bit parts in the movie Telefon, the old 1950s TV series Playhouse 90 and, most recently, the hit NBC-TV series Friday Night Lights. In 1960, Hambrick appeared in one episode of the 1950s CBS-TV series General Electric Theater. Since 2003, Hambrick has appeared in four movies: Mia's Father, Wonderful World, Kings of the Evening, and the Texas-based, Gabriel Folse directed film Guilty.

Hambrick was the older brother of retired newscasters Judd Hambrick, who worked alongside John at KABC-TV for a brief period in 1975–76 and also worked in Cleveland (from 1977 to 1985 and from 1993 to 1999 for WJW-TV and WKYC-TV); and Mike Hambrick, who is now a business consultant. John was also the father of television producer Jack Hambrick.

== Cancer diagnosis and death ==
It was announced on July 23, 2013, that Hambrick had been diagnosed with terminal lung cancer. He died at a hospital on September 10, 2013. He was 73.

== Awards and accomplishments ==
Hambrick has received numerous citations for his journalism. Amongst his accomplishments are:

- Emmy - Best Newscast - WNBC-TV, NY, 1983–1984
- Emmy - Cardinal Cooke Funeral - WNBC-TV, NY, 1983–1984
- Emmy - Florida's Obscenity Showdown - WCIX, Miami, 1991
- Silver Circle Award by Academy of Television Arts & Sciences - Miami, 1990
- Long Island Press Club Award - 1981-1982
