= WUTB =

Television station in Baltimore

- Baltimore, Maryland; United States
- Channels: Digital: 26 (UHF), shared with WBFF; Virtual: 24

Programming
- Affiliations: 24.1: Roar

Ownership
- Owner: Sinclair Broadcast Group; (Chesapeake Television Licensee, LLC)
- Sister stations: WBFF, WNUV

History
- First air date: December 24, 1985
- Former call signs: WKJL-TV (1985–1987); WHSW (1987–1992); WHSW-TV (1992–1998)
- Former channel numbers: Analog: 24 (UHF, 1985–2009); Digital: 41 (UHF, 2000–2018), 46 (UHF, 2018–2020)
- Former affiliations: Religious ind. (1985–1987); HSN (1986–1998); UPN (1998–2006); MyNetworkTV (2006–2021)
- Call sign meaning: United Television Baltimore

Technical information
- Licensing authority: FCC
- Facility ID: 60552
- ERP: 420 kW
- HAAT: 372.8 m (1,223 ft)
- Transmitter coordinates: 39°20′10.4″N 76°38′57.9″W

Links
- Public license information: Public file; LMS

WUTB (channel 24) is a television station in Baltimore, Maryland, United States, airing programming from the digital multicast network Roar. It is owned and operated by Sinclair Broadcast Group alongside Fox/MyNetworkTV affiliate WBFF (channel 45) and co-managed with CW affiliate WNUV (channel 54). The stations share studios on 41st Street off the Jones Falls Expressway in the Woodberry neighborhood of north Baltimore. Through a channel sharing agreement, WUTB and WBFF transmit using the latter station's spectrum from an antenna adjacent to the studios.

== History ==
=== Prior history of channel 24 in Baltimore ===
The channel 24 allocation in Baltimore was originally occupied by WMET-TV, which began broadcasting on March 1, 1967, as the first UHF station in Baltimore and the city's fourth. It was a low-budget and low-powered station that was sister to WOOK-TV/WFAN-TV in Washington, D.C. Both stations were owned by United Broadcasting Company. The original channel 24 was headquartered in the former Avalon Theatre on Park Heights Avenue. In 1972, both stations ceased broadcasting due to financial difficulties.

=== As WKJL/WHSW ===
In February 1977, Jesus Lives, Inc., whose president hosted a syndicated talk show of the same name, applied to build a new station on channel 24. The firm promised to use the station "as a tool to spread the Gospel of Jesus Christ". A competing applicant, Buford Television of Maryland, eyed the station for possible use to transmit subscription television. Jesus Lives ended the comparative hearing in December 1980 by buying out Buford Television's bid.

The construction of WKJL-TV went very slowly. The founder, Rev. Philip Zampino, moved to Florida, and the license fight had saddled Jesus Lives with legal fees. By 1982, the station project a late 1984 launch. $75,000 had been raised to purchase and prepare a site in the Randallstown area, of $100,000 needed. However, fundraising continued to lag, and so too did construction activities. Jesus Lives, which renamed itself Look and Live Ministries, accepted a $100,000 loan from Liberty Baptist College (now Liberty University), owned by Jerry Falwell, in late 1984 to accelerate the process. Right before going on air, Look and Live agreed to sell the station to Family Media Inc., a subsidiary of Christian publishing company Thomas Nelson.

Family Media completed construction, and on December 24, 1985, channel 24 returned to Baltimore nearly 14 years after it had left, as WKJL-TV. Family Media harbored intentions of possibly expanding with more stations to feature family programming and conservative-oriented news. It also briefly tried its hand at a local children's show, Pop's Place with Stu Kerr.

However, the Baltimore entertainment market had changed rapidly around the time that WKJL-TV started. Where Baltimore had one independent station, it suddenly had three: WBFF, WKJL-TV, and WNUV-TV, which had devoted its evenings to Super TV subscription service until March 31, 1986. The boom in independents coincided with a flattening of national advertising revenues, squeezing stations economically. In this environment, Family Media bowed out after less than a year and filed to sell the station to Silver King Broadcasting, the stations division of the Home Shopping Network (HSN), which was purchasing outlets in major markets. In October 1986, the station added 18 hours a day of HSN programming, conserving six hours daily of its existing programming and a six-hour religious block on Sunday mornings. The FCC granted full approval in January 1987, at which time the station began 24-hour HSN broadcasting with the new call sign of WHSW.

=== As WUTB ===
HSN owned WHSW for just a decade before an unexpected buyer appeared. In 1997, Sinclair Broadcast Group signed a group affiliation deal with The WB that saw several of its UPN affiliates, including WNUV, switch to that network. This would have left UPN without a Baltimore station. Further, Silver King, which was preparing to debut its "CityVision" concept for major-market independents, did not feel Baltimore was large enough to support one. UPN half-owner Chris-Craft Industries, through its United Television division (unrelated to United Broadcasting Company), spent $80 million to buy WHSW.

On January 18, 1998, the WNUV affiliation switch to The WB took effect, and channel 24 began airing UPN programming under new WUTB call letters. Days prior, the FCC had approved the sale of the station. WUTB was thrown together in four weeks, allowing UPN to remain on the air in the market without a single day of lost network programming. In its first year, the station immediately began outperforming the national ratings for UPN. Chris-Craft ran the station out of then-sister station WWOR-TV's facilities in Secaucus, New Jersey, and fed the station's programming to its transmitter site in Baltimore; this included WWOR's local news coverage of the September 11 attacks. On July 25, 2001, Fox Television Stations purchased WUTB and the other Chris-Craft stations; the purchase led to some speculation that WBFF would lose Fox programming. WBFF, along with Sinclair's 19 other Fox affiliates, would renew their affiliations in November 2002, keeping UPN on WUTB.

=== MyNetworkTV era, sale to Sinclair ===
WUTB's logo as My24 from September 2006 to June 2013; after Sinclair took control of the station, its on-air brand was changed to MyTV Baltimore.

WUTB's logo as MyTV Baltimore from June 2013 to July 2021.

On January 24, 2006, CBS Corporation and the Warner Bros. Entertainment unit of Time Warner announced that they would shut down The WB and UPN and merge some of their programming on a new network called The CW. However, none of the Fox-owned UPN stations were chosen as charter affiliates for the new network, immediately dropping UPN branding; with many major-market stations needing programming, News Corporation created MyNetworkTV to service its stations, including WUTB, and others passed over by The CW. WNUV then affiliated with The CW in May.

On May 15, 2012, as part of a five-year affiliation agreement extension between Fox and Sinclair's 19 Fox affiliates (including WBFF) through 2017, Fox included an option for Sinclair to purchase WUTB, exercisable from July 1, 2012, to March 31, 2013. In exchange, Fox received an option to buy any combination of six Sinclair-owned CW and MyNetworkTV affiliates (two of which were standalone stations affiliated with the latter service) in three of four markets: Raleigh (WLFL and WRDC), Las Vegas (KVCW and KVMY), Cincinnati (WSTR-TV) and Norfolk, Virginia (WTVZ). On November 29, 2012, Sinclair exercised its option to purchase WUTB through Deerfield Media for $2.7 million.

In January 2013, Fox announced that it would not buy any of the Sinclair stations included in the purchase option. On May 6, 2013, the FCC granted its approval of WUTB to Deerfield Media, which was formally consummated on June 1. Sinclair began operating WUTB under a local marketing agreement, and operations moved to the WBFF-WNUV studio center in Woodberry.

=== Shift of MyNetworkTV to a WBFF subchannel ===
In July 2021, WUTB's "My TV Baltimore" programming was moved to WBFF's second subchannel, with TBD programming, previously carried by the WBFF subchannel, in turn moving to WUTB.

On August 12, 2025, Sinclair announced that it would acquire full ownership of WUTB for $775,000, creating a legal duopoly with WBFF; the sale was completed on November 18.

== Newscasts ==
On September 4, 2006, WUTB began simulcasting the weekday morning and 10 p.m. newscasts from former Washington sister station, Fox-owned WTTG. Branded by the station as My 24 News, an on-screen logo bug with the My 24 News brand was placed on the bottom left hand corner of the screen. Management at both stations cited the decision to simulcast the news programs as a by-product of cross-regional news interests and increasing overlap between the Baltimore and Washington media markets.

During the 2006 MLB postseason, WTTG's 10 p.m. newscast aired on Washington's MyNetworkTV station WDCA under the name Fox 5 News at 10 Special Edition, while continuing to be simulcast on WUTB. The same situation occurred in 2007, but the newscast was known as My 20 News at 10. When Fox Sports or other programming delayed the 10 p.m. newscast from airing on WTTG, it was still produced for WUTB. The station dropped the morning news simulcast after the November 30, 2007, edition and the 10 p.m. simulcast was discontinued by January 2008.

== Technical information ==
=== Subchannel ===
Subchannels of WBFF and WUTB
License	Channel	Res.	Short name	Programming
WBFF	45.1	720p	WBFF45	Fox
WBFF	45.2	720p	MyTV	Independent with MyNetworkTV
WBFF	45.4	480i	Charge!	Charge!
WUTB	24.1	480i	WUTB	Roar

Through an affiliation agreement between the MyNetworkTV and former owner Fox Television Stations, WUTB began carrying Bounce TV on 24.2 in March 2012. The network moved to WMAR-TV's third subchannel on September 15, 2014.

=== Analog-to-digital conversion ===
WUTB shut down its analog signal, over UHF channel 24, on June 12, 2009, the official date on which full-power television stations in the United States transitioned from analog to digital broadcasts under federal mandate. The station's digital signal remained on its pre-transition UHF channel 41, using virtual channel 24.

=== Spectrum sale and channel-sharing agreement ===
WUTB's spectrum was sold for $122 million in the 2016-2017 FCC incentive auction. Sinclair then arranged a channel-share with WBFF.
