= Ron Smith (radio host) =

American journalist

- Born: Ronald Coleman Smith; December 2, 1941; Troy, New York, United States
- Died: December 19, 2011 (aged 70); Shrewsbury, Pennsylvania, United States
- Occupations: Radio host, political commentator, TV news anchor, reporter
- Years active: 1968–2011
- Spouse: June Ray
- Children: 5

Ronald Coleman Smith (December 2, 1941 – December 19, 2011) was an American talk radio show host on WBAL in Baltimore, Maryland.

== Early life ==
A native of Troy, New York, Smith dropped out of high school at age seventeen. He served in the Marine Corps from 1959 to 1963. Following his discharge, he moved to Albany, New York, where he worked in community theater. In 1963 he enrolled in Northeast Broadcasting School and after graduating, worked as a disk jockey at WHAV in Haverhill, Massachusetts.

== Broadcast career ==
He began his television reporting career at WTEN-TV in Albany in 1968. Five years later, in 1973, he became a weekend anchor at WBAL-TV in Baltimore. From 1976 to 1980 he was co-anchor on that station's evening "Action News" broadcast, sharing the news desk with the likes of Sue Simmons, Mike Hambrick, Spencer Christian and Stan Stovall.

On August 5, 1984, after a four-year stint as a stockbroker, Smith became a radio show host at WBAL-AM. Calling himself "The Voice of Reason," his show changed after the start of the Iraq War to focus more on interviews with personalities and newsmakers, both conservatives and liberals. When WBAL cancelled Rush Limbaugh's program in June 2006, his show expanded to four hours, from 2 to 6 pm ET, but was returned to its three-hour format in April 2007 when another host was found for the noon to three spot. He would continue broadcasting on radio until he retired for health reasons in 2011.

In September 2011, Smith was recognized by being selected as the first annual recipient of The Charles Carroll of Carrollton Award in honor of his twenty-seven years of bringing the concepts of The Constitution to his massive listening audience.

== Political views ==
Thomas DiLorenzo, a friend of Smith, categorized him as an "Old Right" conservative. Smith was a critic of the Bush administration and the Iraq War.

While Smith usually took conservative or paleoconservative political positions, he also frequently criticized Republicans. He supported Governor Robert L. Ehrlich, but referred to George H. W. Bush as "Joe Isuzu." He reluctantly supported the American invasion on Afghanistan, but opposed regime change in Iraq. He frequently addressed issues about the right to own and carry a firearm and the immorality of gun control on his program. In addition, his favorite topics included the discussion of unintended consequences of government programs, corrupt politicians, and what he viewed as the disastrous state of public education, especially in Baltimore.

In an op-ed for the Baltimore Sun on March 10, 2011, he described the US military's treatment of detained alleged WikiLeaks source Chelsea Manning as torture.

== Illness and death ==
On October 17, 2011, Smith announced on-air that he had "grade four pancreatic cancer that's metastasized to your liver, your abdominal cavity, the lungs and so on." On November 17, 2011, Smith announced on-air that "After consultation among all those involved, it was determined that additional chemotherapy was a futile way to go ... there isn't going to be any miracle. I'm okay with it."

On November 28, 2011, Smith announced his retirement from WBAL, citing his dependence on home hospice care. He died on December 19, 2011, aged 70.
