= Rod Daniels =

Rod Daniels is an American television news broadcaster. He was the former evening television news anchor at WBAL-TV, Channel 11, the longtime Hearst Communications-owned station and NBC-TV affiliate in Baltimore, Maryland. He retired in 2015 after more than 30 years of service at the same station.

Daniels graduated from William Paterson University in Wayne, New Jersey (part of the New Jersey state system of higher education) in 1975 with a Bachelor of Arts degree in speech communications; he later received a President's Medal award from his alma mater in 2004.

Daniels began his career as a weekend sports anchor at WIS-TV in Columbia, South Carolina. He then moved to WTAE-TV in Pittsburgh, Pennsylvania as a weekend anchor and reporter, and later to WISN-TV in Milwaukee. He worked at WBAL-TV (Channel 11) in Baltimore, Maryland from 1984 to 2015.

He received the Catholic Archdiocese Medal of Honor for Communications for his coverage of church activities in the Roman Catholic Church.

During Pope John Paul II's visit to Baltimore in 1995, Daniels was chosen by the hosting Roman Catholic Archdiocese of Baltimore to serve as announcer / host of the celebration Mass at the downtown baseball stadium of Oriole Park at Camden Yards (part of the Camden Yards Sports Complex).
