= Woodberry, Baltimore =

Woodberry Clipper Mill, Television Hill
- Neighborhood of Baltimore
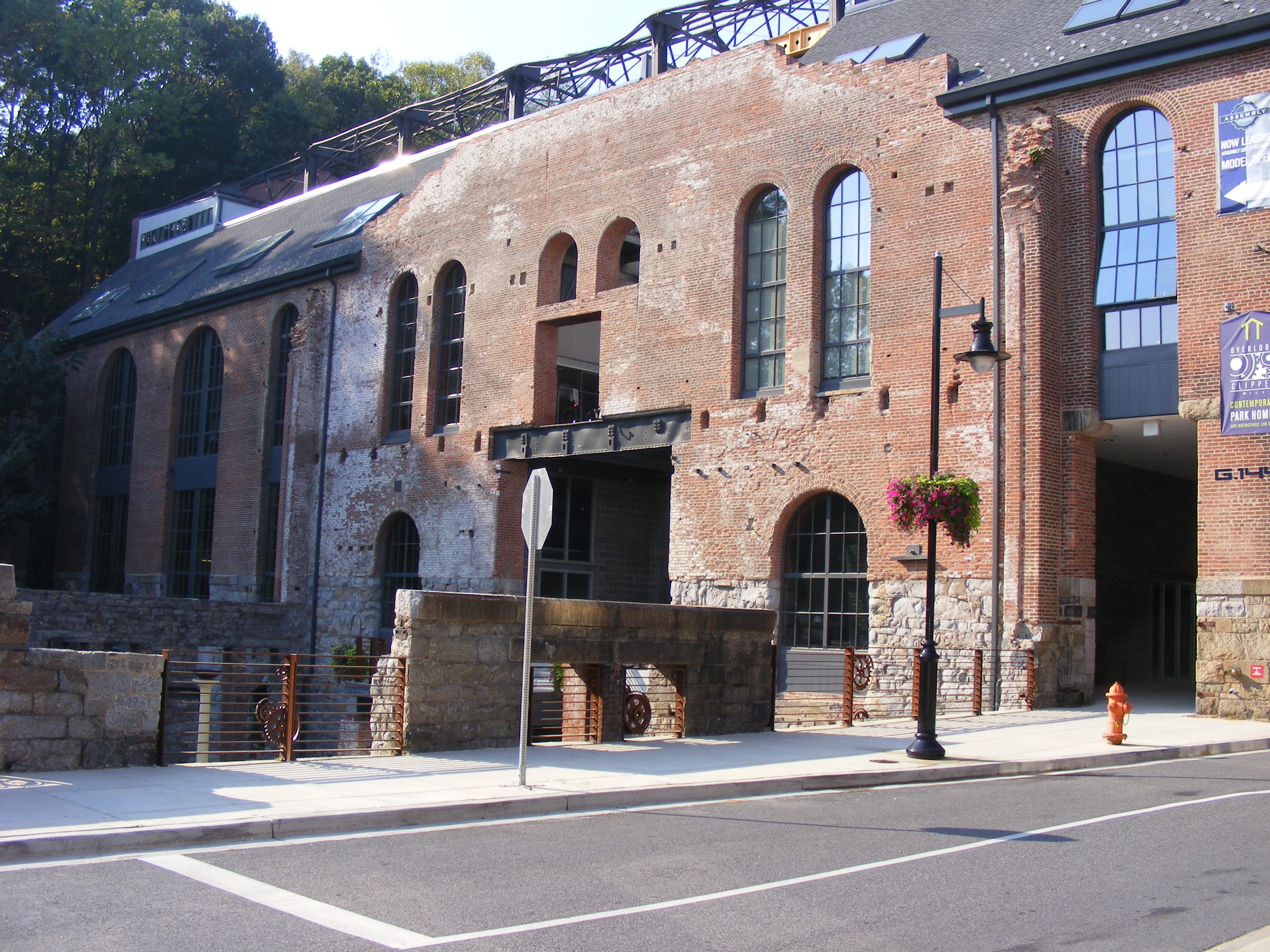
- Woodberry Mill
- Interactive map of Woodberry; Clipper Mill, Television Hill
- Country: United States
- State: Maryland
- City: Baltimore
- Time zone: UTC-5 (Eastern)
  - Summer (DST): EDT
- ZIP code: 21211
- Area code: 410, 443, and 667

- Woodberry Historic District
- U.S. National Register of Historic Places
- U.S. Historic district
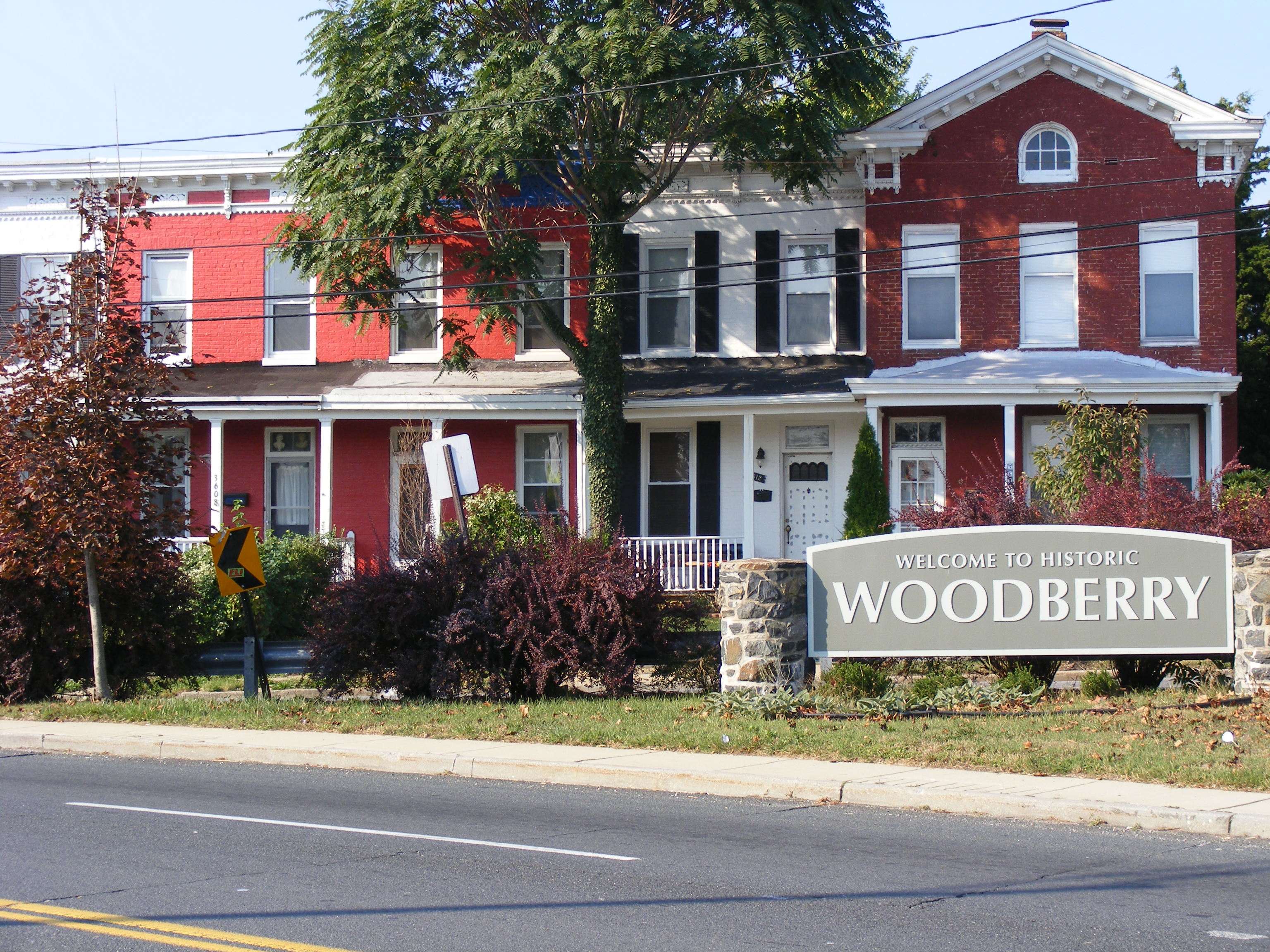
- The Woodberry neighborhood of Baltimore.

- Location within Baltimore Location within Maryland Location within the United States
- Location: Roughly Clipper Ave, Druid Park Dr., and Girard, Hooper, Keystone, Malden, Parkdale, and Rockrose Aves., Baltimore, Maryland
- Coordinates: 39°20′05″N 76°38′52″W
- Area: 45 acres (18 ha)
- Built: 1843
- Architect: Morling, Frank L.; et al.
- Architectural style: Gothic Revival, Italianate, Et Al.
- NRHP reference No.: 03001326
- Added to NRHP: December 29, 2003

Woodberry is a neighborhood located in the north-central area of Baltimore, Maryland, USA. A largely residential, middle-class area, Woodberry is a historic community bordered on the north by Cold Spring Lane, on the south by Druid Hill Park, on the west by Greenspring Avenue, and on the east by the Jones Falls Expressway and the Jones Falls. Woodberry is located within Postal Zip code 21211.

Community organizations include the Concerned Citizens of Woodberry.

Greenspring Trails is a locally popular trail.

== Television Hill ==
39°20′5″N 76°38′59″W

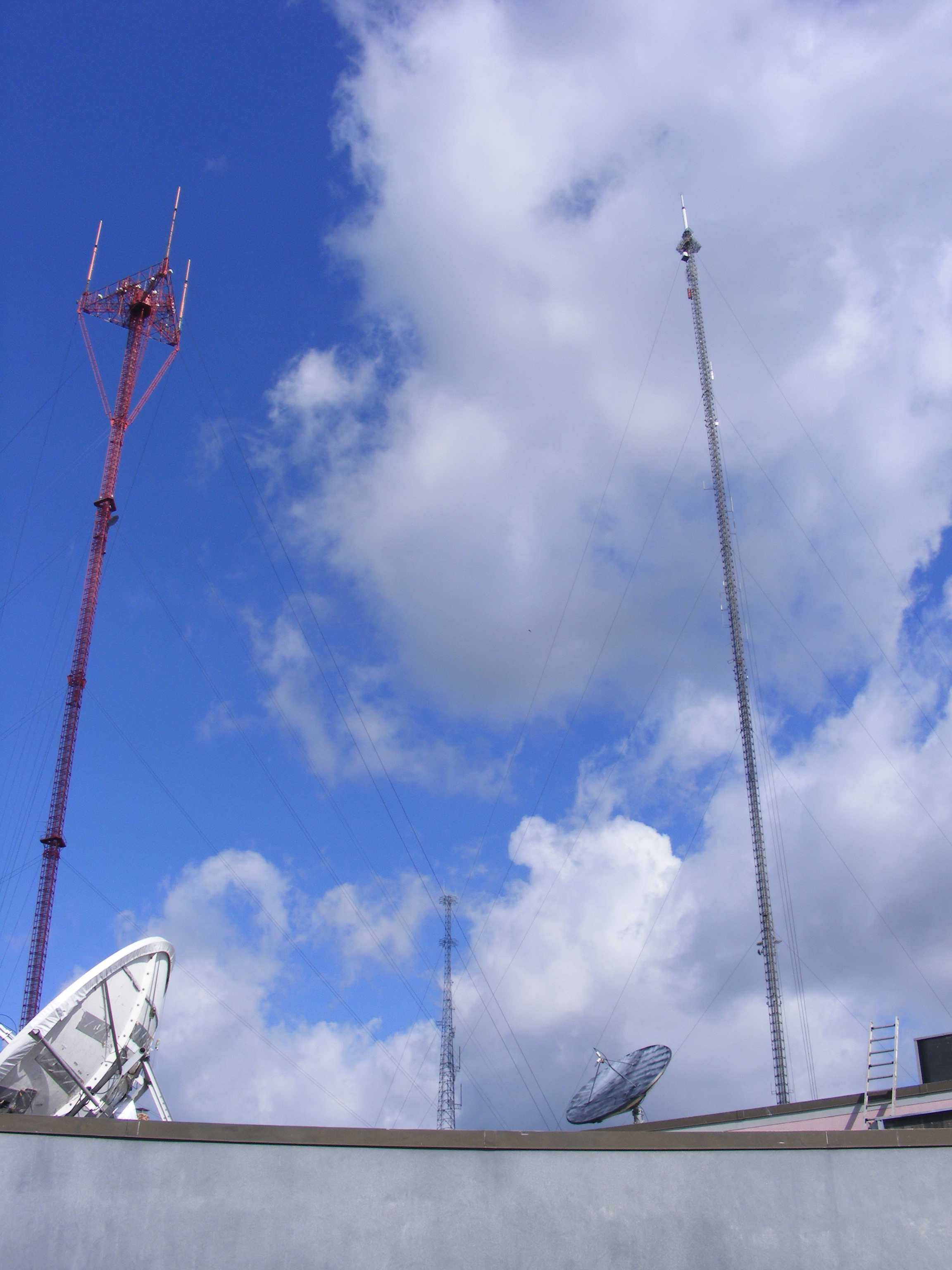
Television Hill's TV towers

Woodberry also houses the facilities for four of Baltimore's commercial television stations, and because of its altitude, it also is the site of two large broadcasting masts. This area, once known as Malden Hill, is also known as Television Hill (or simply TV Hill). The first television station and transmission tower were completed in 1948.

TV Hill is the transmitting site for four of the city's television stations and two radio stations. Three of the TV outlets, WMAR-TV (channel 2), WBAL-TV (channel 11), and WJZ-TV (channel 13)–along with radio stations WIYY (97.9 FM) and WWMX (106.5 FM)–transmit from a red-colored, tri-mast candelabra tower, which stands 997 feet (304 meters) above ground level.

Two other television stations, Sinclair Broadcast Group-owned WBFF (channel 45) and WNUV (channel 54), along with radio station WZFT (104.3 FM), transmit from a single tower just to the northeast of the candelabra; this mast stands 1,280 feet (390 meters) above ground level. A third, shorter tower also handles communications for various municipal service agencies of the City of Baltimore (e.g., police, fire, public works).

Five television stations also have their broadcasting studios located on TV Hill: WJZ-TV, located at the end of Malden Avenue and to the west of the towers; the WBAL Building (which is also home to WIYY and WBAL radio), on Hooper Avenue to the northeast; and WBFF/WNUV (and WUTB), which share facilities on West 41st Street, just southeast of the towers. (The WMAR-TV studios are located on York Road, at the Baltimore City/Baltimore County line.)

== Housing stock ==
Some of the first housing situated in what is now Television Hill was built by David Carroll for his textile mill workers.

Though there are the occasional apartment buildings, much of Woodberry's housing stock consists of two- and three-story rowhouses built in the early 20th century.

== Demographics ==
At the 2000 U.S. Census, there were 1,100 people living in the neighborhood. The racial makeup of Woodberry was 72.1 percent White, 22.1 percent African American, 0.9 percent Native American, 1.4 percent Asian, 1.3 percent from other races, and 1.8 percent from two or more races. Hispanic or Latino of any race comprised 1.8 percent of the population. 61.4 percent of occupied housing units were owner-occupied. Twelve percent of housing units were vacant.

More than 95% of those in the civilian labor force were employed, 2.5 percent were unemployed, and 39.2 percent were not in the labor force. The median household income was $36,806.

== Companies ==
- Franklin Balmar

== Public transit ==
Woodberry is served by the Woodberry Light Rail Station on Union Avenue. Bus lines 21 and 22 also serve the neighborhood.

== See also ==
- List of Baltimore neighborhoods
