= WBFF =

Television station in Baltimore

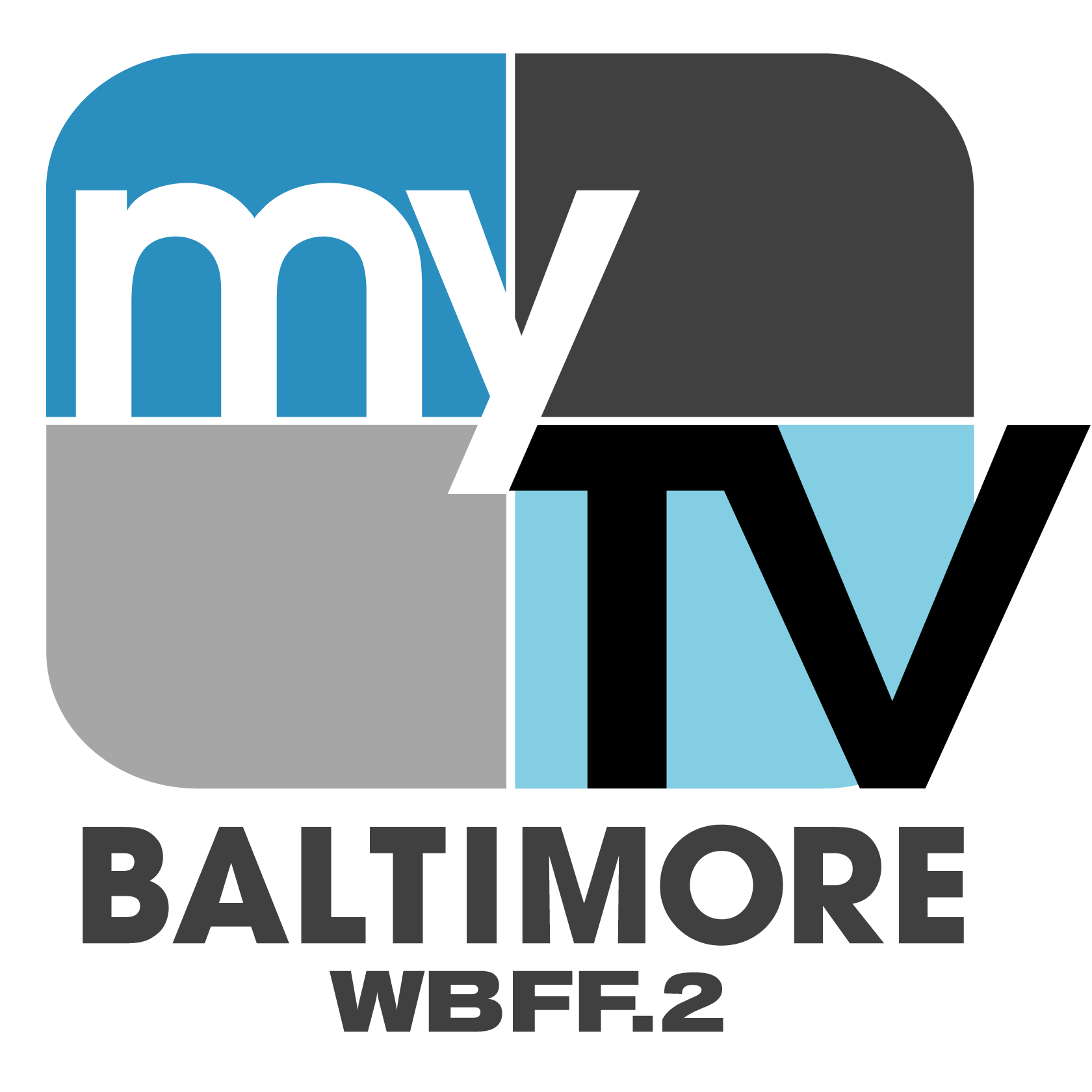
- Baltimore, Maryland; United States
- Channels: Digital: 26 (UHF), shared with WUTB; Virtual: 45
- Branding: Fox 45; MyTV Baltimore (45.2)

Programming
- Affiliations: 45.1: Fox; 45.2: Independent with MyNetworkTV; 45.4: Charge!

Ownership
- Owner: Sinclair Broadcast Group; (Chesapeake Television Licensee, LLC)
- Sister stations: WUTB, WNUV

History
- Founded: 1966
- First air date: April 11, 1971
- Former channel numbers: Analog: 45 (UHF, 1971–2009); Digital: 46 (UHF, 2004–2020)
- Former affiliations: Independent (1971–1986)
- Call sign meaning: "Baltimore's Forty-Five" (originally "Baltimore's Finest Features")

Technical information
- Licensing authority: FCC
- Facility ID: 10758
- ERP: 420 kW
- HAAT: 372.8 m (1,223 ft)
- Transmitter coordinates: 39°20′10.4″N 76°38′57.9″W

Links
- Public license information: Public file; LMS
- Website: foxbaltimore.com (45.1); mytvbaltimore.com (45.2)

WBFF (channel 45) is a television station in Baltimore, Maryland, United States, affiliated with Fox and MyNetworkTV. It is one of two flagship stations of Sinclair Broadcast Group (based in nearby Hunt Valley), alongside ABC affiliate WJLA-TV (channel 7) in Washington, D.C., and is sister to WUTB (channel 24) and co-managed with CW affiliate WNUV (channel 54).

The three stations share studios on 41st Street off the Jones Falls Expressway on "Television Hill" in the Woodberry neighborhood of north Baltimore. Through a channel sharing agreement, WBFF and WUTB transmit using the former station's spectrum from an antenna adjacent to the studios. The 1,280-foot (390 m) tall tower stands near the earlier landmark "candelabra tower" from the late 1950s in use by the city's original three main VHF stations (WMAR-TV, WBAL-TV, and WJZ-TV).

== History ==
WBFF first came on the air on April 11, 1971, founded by what was then called the Chesapeake Television Corporation, which was controlled by Julian Sinclair Smith. The original meaning of its call sign was "Baltimore's Finest Features" because it primarily aired old movies in its earliest years. It was Baltimore's second commercial UHF station and second independent station, signing on four years after WMET-TV (channel 24, frequency now occupied by WUTB) began operations. In its early years, WBFF was a general entertainment station. For example, The Baltimore Sun wrote in 1990 that WBFF had been "the home of scratchy prints of Kojak".

In afternoons, WBFF had a local children's show titled "Captain Chesapeake" (played by George Lewis) along with his side-kick "Mondy" the sea monster played by James Uhrin (who continued to work at WBFF under the alias "Traffic Jam Jimmy").

This WBFF logo dates to the mid-1980s. The "C" in the logo is for Sinclair Broadcast Group's forerunner, Chesapeake Television.

Despite its financial troubles, WBFF became profitable enough that Julian Smith decided to expand his broadcast interests. Through a Chesapeake Television subsidiary, Commercial Radio Institute, Smith launched a new independent station in Pittsburgh, WPTT (now WPNT), in 1978. In 1984, Commercial Radio Institute signed on Smith's third station, independent WTTE in Columbus, Ohio. That same year, WBFF received local competition again when WNUV-TV, then a two-year-old subscription television outlet, began to adopt a general entertainment schedule during the daytime and full-time by 1986.

In 1985, Julian Smith merged his three stations into the Sinclair Broadcast Group, and around this time one of his sons, David D. Smith, took a prominent role in the operations of the three stations. In 1986, Sinclair agreed to affiliate WBFF and WTTE with the fledgling Fox Broadcasting Company, which debuted on October 9 of that year. The growth and rise of Fox coincided with that of Sinclair Broadcast Group, which expanded its reach beyond Baltimore, Columbus and Pittsburgh during the 1990s.

WBFF's news department opened in April 1991. On June 3, 1991, the News at Ten debuted on WBFF, co-anchored by Lisa Willis (formerly of WWOR-TV in Secaucus, New Jersey) and Jeff Barnd. Baltimore Sun TV critic David Zurawik found the debut edition to be "visually interesting" but criticized the story selection: "What Channel 45 offered last night instead of hard news were features on money, health and entertainment."

Then, in September, Sinclair took the bold step of challenging WMAR-TV's pending license renewal and filing its own competing application for a new station. As WMAR-TV had been sold the previous June to the E. W. Scripps Company, Sinclair argued that an out-of-town corporation could not effectively serve the city's public interest and the valuable channel allocation—a channel 2 analog signal traveled a very long distance under normal conditions—should be granted to an established local broadcaster instead. The gambit did not work, and WMAR-TV remained on channel 2.

WBFF nearly lost its Fox affiliation in 1994 when Fox entered talks with WJZ-TV, but it opted to affiliate with CBS instead. WBAL-TV was also considered after the station dropped CBS, but opted to affiliate with NBC instead.

In 1996, Channel 45 began airing Baltimore Ravens games via the NFL on Fox; the station is given at least two games a season to air (usually when the team plays host to an NFC team at M&T Bank Stadium); starting in 2014, when the NFL instituted its new 'cross-flex' broadcast rules, games can be arbitrarily moved from WJZ-TV to WBFF. Additionally, the station aired all Thursday Night Football games involving the Ravens from 2018 to 2021 through Fox's exclusive contract.

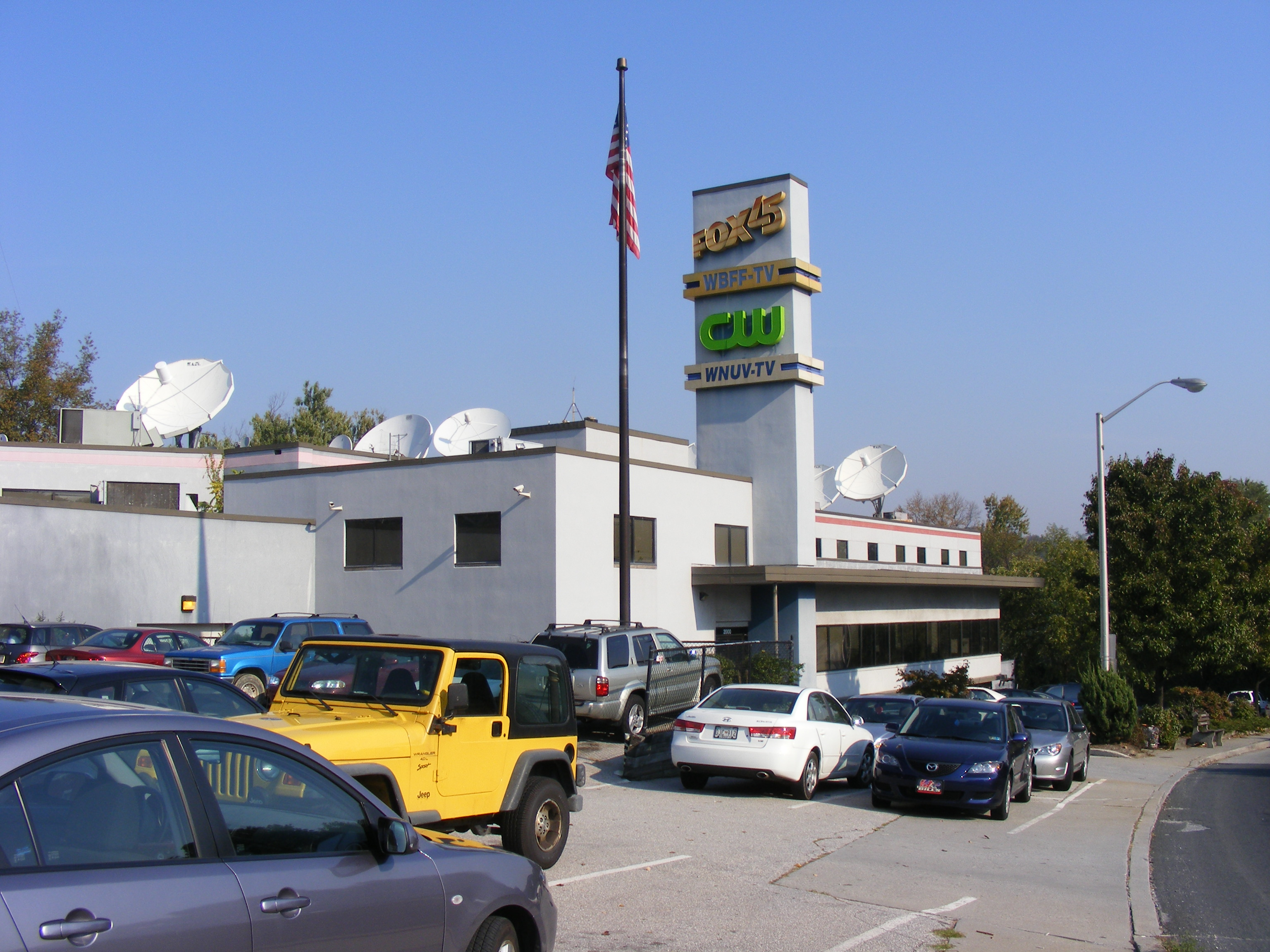
WBFF and WNUV's combined studio and office facility, in Baltimore's Woodberry neighborhood.

Sinclair purchased ABRY Communications, owner of WNUV, in 1994. As duopolies were not allowed at the time, channel 54 was spun off to Glencairn Ltd., a company owned by former Sinclair executive Edwin Edwards. However, Glencairn's stock was almost entirely owned by the Smith family. In effect, Sinclair now had a duopoly in Baltimore—and had emasculated its major rival in its hometown. Sinclair further circumvented the rules by taking over WNUV's operations under a local marketing agreement (LMA), with WBFF as senior partner.

Sinclair tried to buy Glencairn outright in 2001, but was unable to buy WNUV due to the FCC's rules on duopolies. Despite its relatively large size, the Baltimore market has only seven full-power stations (or six, if two stations licensed in the market that are operated by Maryland Public Television are treated as one)—two fewer than what FCC regulations allowed to legally permit a duopoly (the FCC required a market to have eight unique station owners once a duopoly was formed, effectively limiting duopolies to markets with at least nine full-power stations). Glencairn changed its name to Cunningham Broadcasting and retained ownership of WNUV. However, nearly all of Cunningham's stock is held in trusts owned by the Smith family. This de facto duopoly continues to this day, while the close relationship between Sinclair and Glencairn/Cunningham has led to claims that Cunningham is a corporate shell that Sinclair uses in order to evade FCC ownership restrictions.

While WBFF entered the new century thriving both locally and as a Fox affiliate, its network partner threatened the station's immediate future. In 2001, Fox's parent company, the News Corporation, became the new owner of Baltimore's UPN affiliate WUTB (the former WMET-TV) through its purchase of most of Chris-Craft Industries' television holdings. Rumors abounded that Fox was considering moving its programming from WBFF to WUTB. In a move made clearly to protect its home interests, Sinclair persuaded Fox to sign a long-term contract to keep WBFF with the network. The same threat re-emerged in January 2006, when UPN owner CBS Corporation and Time Warner, owners of The WB Television Network, announced that those two networks would be shut down and replaced by the new CW Television Network. However, a month after The CW's formation, News Corporation announced that WUTB and its other UPN affiliates would become the nuclei of its new MyNetworkTV service.

On May 1, 2006, the station launched its .2 digital channel with retro programming, the first non-weather subchannel in the market.

On May 15, 2012, Sinclair Broadcast Group and Fox agreed to a five-year extension to the network's affiliation agreement with Sinclair's 19 Fox stations, including WBFF, that would run through 2017. This included an option (that was exercisable from July 1, 2012, to March 31, 2013) to allow Sinclair to purchase WUTB, resulting in the creation of a virtual triopoly with WBFF and WNUV; while giving Fox the option to buy any combination of six CW and MyNetworkTV affiliates (two of which were standalone stations affiliated with the latter service) owned by Sinclair in three of four markets: Raleigh (WLFL and WRDC), Las Vegas (KVCW and KVMY), Cincinnati (WSTR-TV) and Norfolk (WTVZ). Under the agreement and the WUTB purchase option, Sinclair would pay $52.7 million to continue WBFF's affiliation with Fox; however, if Fox exercised the option to buy any of the Sinclair stations that were included in the option, the affiliation payments would decrease to $25 million. On November 29, 2012, Sinclair exercised its option to purchase WUTB through Deerfield Media for $2.7 million. Following the completion of the sale, WUTB began to be operated by Sinclair under a local marketing agreement, as with Deerfield's other stations. In January 2013, Fox announced that it would not exercise its option to buy any of the Sinclair stations included in the earlier purchase option. On May 6, 2013, the FCC granted its approval of WUTB to Deerfield Media. Sinclair officially took over the operations of WUTB eight days later, although the sale was not formally consummated until June 1. With the completion of the WUTB sale, this made Baltimore the largest market where one company (outside of non-commercial public television station groups) operated a virtual triopoly between full-power stations. WBFF remained the only station in the Baltimore market never to change its primary network affiliate.

On the afternoon of April 28, 2016, WBFF's studios were evacuated in response to a threat by a person wearing a hoax bomb; the suspect also allegedly set his vehicle on fire in the station's parking lot. The suspect was later shot and apprehended by police; besides a desire to share end times prophecy content with the station (a USB drive with videos was confiscated by a security guard), no specific motive for the incident was determined.

== WBFF-DT2 ==
On May 1, 2006, WBFF launched a new service on its second digital subchannel (45.2) originally called WBFF-2, which was later renamed Good TV. This digital-only channel featured classic television programs (its format predated the existence of several nationally distributed digital multicast networks focused on classic television programming such as MeTV, Antenna TV and Retro Television Network). In addition, "Good TV" offered expanded coverage of church services on Sunday mornings, local events, and paid programming. This channel ceased broadcasting on or around September 30, 2008, to make way for This TV until 2017, when it was replaced with TBD programming. In July 2021, TBD moved to WUTB; that station's previous "My TV Baltimore" programming, including the MyNetworkTV lineup, in turn moved to the 45.2 subchannel.

== News operation ==
WBFF presently broadcasts 55 hours of locally produced newscasts each week (with 9 1/2 hours each weekday, four hours on Saturdays and 3 1/2 hours on Sundays); in regards to the number of hours devoted to news programming, it is the highest local newscast output among Baltimore's broadcast television stations as well as in the state of Maryland in general. It is also the highest output of Sinclair Broadcast Group's stations (both out of its Fox affiliates and the company's overall television stations).

Sinclair decided to invest in developing a news department for WBFF, with the station launching a nightly 10 p.m. newscast on June 3, 1991, co-anchored by Lisa Willis (formerly of WWOR-TV) and Jeff Barnd. The station added a weekday morning newscast in March 2000. In February 2003, it added a weeknight 11 p.m. newscast that was broadcast from Sinclair's now-defunct centralized news service, News Central, located in Hunt Valley. The start time of the weekday morning newscast was moved to 5:30 a.m. and an early evening newscast at 5:30 p.m. was subsequently added to the schedule in January 2005. On June 2, 2008, WBFF became the first Baltimore television station to begin broadcast its local newscasts in high definition.

Jeff Barnd, a former WBFF news anchor, also hosted and provided commentary for the Sinclair-distributed syndicated news program American Crossroads. WBFF was featured in an episode during the third season of The Simple Life. On that episode, Paris Hilton and Nicole Richie took control of the station's weekday morning newscast. The two read the weather forecast and messed with the teleprompter. Tony Harris, later a CNN anchor, was once WBFF's lead anchor (co-anchoring with Lisa Willis). In 2015, former WJZ-TV co-anchor Kai Jackson was named the station's lead anchor.

On January 24, 2011, WBFF expanded its weekday morning newscast from four to five hours to 5–10 a.m. weekdays, with the 9 a.m. edition called Fox 45 Good Day Baltimore. On April 9, 2012, WBFF expanded its early evening newscast by adding another half-hour at 5 p.m., shifting Judge Judy to a full-hour at 4 p.m.; the 5:30 p.m. newscast remained, but was treated as a separate newscast. In 2015, the station added a 4 p.m. newscast pushing Judge Judy back to 3 p.m. On January 20, 2013, WBFF debuted weekend morning newscasts, featuring a two-hour Saturday morning newscast and three hours of newscasts on Sunday mornings (with the third hour of the Sunday newscast airing after Fox News Sunday).

=== Controversy ===
On December 21, 2014, WBFF's news operation came under criticism for airing a video that some alleged had misleading edits. The video was of a protest over police brutality in the aftermath of the killing of Eric Garner, where protesters, led by a Baltimore woman named Tawanda Jones, chanted "We won't stop. We can't stop till killer cops are in cellblocks." The video, as edited and shown on the station's 10 p.m. newscast, made it seem like protesters were chanting "kill a cop". A day after the video aired, WBFF issued an apology over the edited video online, saying the report reflected an "honest misunderstanding" of what the protesters were chanting, and that the report has been removed from the station's website. A news anchor for the station later made an in-person apology to Jones, who appeared during the station's 5:30 p.m. newscast.

In the aftermath of the incident, reporter Melinda Roeder and photographer Greg McNair were fired from the station in connection with their alleged involvement with the video. The station's news director at the time, Mike Tomko, was suspended for one day.

The station would again stoke controversy in June 2024, when the guild for The Baltimore Sun revealed that several stories in the newspaper had been repurposed from the news staff of WBFF without their prior knowledge, including existing content being edited around WBFF's own reporting rather than that of the reporter of The Sun. The paper had been acquired in February of the same year by a consortium led by Sinclair chairman David Smith and Armstrong Williams, a conservative commentator who owns several stations that have shared services agreements with Sinclair and whose weekly program is carried by its stations. The station came under fire at the same time for alarmism involving its coverage of crime occurring in the Fells Point neighborhood.

In December 2024, The Sentencing Project released a report analyzing how juvenile crime was reported on six of Baltimore's leading media outlets. In the report, the organization found that problematic coverage of youth crime was especially prevalent on WBFF, with the station being much more likely to air fear-inducing and sensationalized coverage of crime incidents involving juveniles and perceived leniency in the justice system compared to other local news outlets, with 53 percent of stories about crime in Baltimore published from January to June 2024 being focused on juveniles and that 80 percent of the outlet's crime stories asserted that citywide youth crime rates were rising. This was despite city youth only making up about five percent of arrests in the city and actual juvenile crime data showing a mix of trends, but overall long term trends toward a decline in juvenile crime. The report also alleged that reporters associated with WBFF and the Sinclair Broadcast Group engaged in bullying toward state legislators, with lawmakers reporting being chased to their cars "by media persons confronting them about a fictitious youth crime wave narrative that often relied on the repetition of sensationalized stories lacking the basics of sound reporting".

=== Notable former on-air staff ===
- Kristen Berset – sports anchor
- Tony Harris
- Veronica Johnson – meteorologist (1991–1993)
- Jon Leiberman
- Bob Marella – host of Bingo Break (1994)
- Lori Stokes – reporter (1991–1992)
- Amber Theoharis

== Technical information ==
=== Subchannels ===
The station's signal is multiplexed:

Subchannels of WBFF and WUTB
License	Subchannel	Res.	Short name	Programming
WBFF	45.1	720p	WBFF45	Fox
WBFF	45.2	720p	MyTV	Independent with MyNetworkTV
WBFF	45.4	480i	Charge!	Charge!
WUTB	24.1	480i	WUTB	Roar

=== Analog-to-digital conversion ===
WBFF shut down its analog signal, over UHF channel 45, on February 17, 2009, the original target date on which full-power television stations in the United States were to transition from analog to digital broadcasts under federal mandate (which was later pushed back to June 12, 2009). The station's digital signal remained on its pre-transition UHF channel 46, using virtual channel 45.

WBFF announced in September 2015 that test broadcasts would begin in Baltimore and Washington, D.C., for ATSC 3.0 (dubbed "Futurecast") via a two-transmitter SFN with one transmitter in each city on UHF 43 delivering 4K UHDTV and mobile feeds to viewers. This station, named WI9XXT, began experimental broadcasts on August 24, 2015, and the special temporary authority ended on February 25, 2016. WI9XXT's broadcasts were from WRC-TV's tower in the northwest section of Washington, and from WBFF's tower in Woodberry, Baltimore.

As a part of the repacking process following the 2016–2017 FCC incentive auction, WBFF relocated to UHF channel 26 in 2020.
