= WNUV =

Television station in Baltimore

ATSC 3.0 station
- Baltimore, Maryland; United States
- Channels: Digital: 25 (UHF); Virtual: 54
- Branding: The CW Baltimore

Programming
- Affiliations: 54.1: The CW; for others, see § Technical information and subchannels

Ownership
- Owner: Cunningham Broadcasting; (Baltimore (WNUV-TV) Licensee, Inc.)
- Operator: Sinclair Broadcast Group
- Sister stations: WBFF, WUTB

History
- First air date: July 1, 1982
- Former call signs: WNUV-TV (1982–1998)
- Former channel numbers: Analog: 54 (UHF, 1982–2009); Digital: 40 (UHF, 1998–2018)
- Former affiliations: FNN (1982–1984); Super TV (1982–1986); Independent (1984–1995); UPN (1995–1998); The WB (1998–2006)
- Call sign meaning: Station was founded by New-Vision, Inc.

Technical information
- Licensing authority: FCC
- Facility ID: 7933
- ERP: 750 kW
- HAAT: 372.8 m (1,223 ft)
- Transmitter coordinates: 39°20′10.4″N 76°38′57.9″W

Links
- Public license information: Public file; LMS
- Website: cwbaltimore.com

WNUV (channel 54) is a television station in Baltimore, Maryland, United States, affiliated with The CW. It is owned by Cunningham Broadcasting and operated by Sinclair Broadcast Group alongside Fox/MyNetworkTV affiliate WBFF (channel 45) and WUTB (channel 24). The stations share studios on 41st Street off the Jones Falls Expressway on Television Hill in the Woodberry neighborhood of north Baltimore; WBFF and WNUV are also broadcast from the same tower on the hill.

WNUV began broadcasting on July 1, 1982. During the day, it ran specialty programming from the Financial News Network, which was subsidized by its nighttime broadcast of Super TV, a subscription television service that operated in the Washington and Baltimore areas. Super TV peaked at 30,000 Baltimore subscribers in August 1983, but even though the city of Baltimore was late to be wired for cable, the industry suffered a national decline in the mid-1980s, and WNUV ceased airing Super TV on March 31, 1986. In preparation for its closure, the station had begun to recast itself as a general-entertainment independent station as early as 1984. The founding owner and namesake, New-Vision, Inc., sold the station to ABRY Communications in 1989; ABRY upgraded the transmitter and increased the station's visibility with a campaign allowing residents to vote on programming choices.

ABRY attempted to sell WNUV to Glencairn, Ltd.—a forerunner to Cunningham, owned by former Sinclair employee Edwin Edwards and the mother of the Smith children that controlled Sinclair—in 1993. The deal was met with public scrutiny, and though it initially fell apart, ABRY signed a local marketing agreement directly with Sinclair in 1994 before transferring the license to Glencairn the next year. WNUV affiliated first with UPN in 1995 before switching to The WB in a group deal in 1998 and The CW upon those two networks' merger in 2006. The station aired a WBFF-produced early evening newscast from 1997 to 2005; for most of its history since Sinclair began programming channel 54, it has been used as a test bed for television transmission technologies.

== History ==
=== Early years: Super TV ===
There had been several expressions of interest in Baltimore's ultra high frequency (UHF) channel 54 in the late 1960s and early 1970s. Two applications were considered for the channel in 1967, and the Zamoiski Company held a construction permit for channel 54 as WUHF-TV in the early 1970s. However, it was not until June 23, 1977, when New-Vision, Inc. tendered for filing an application for channel 54, specifying possible use for subscription television (STV) programming. New-Vision found itself in competition with Peter and John Fellowship, owners of Christian FM station WRBS-FM, which had filed by late 1978. The latter group dropped out, leaving New-Vision uncontested for the channel and resulting in the Federal Communications Commission (FCC) granting the firm a construction permit in June 1979. From the name of the company, channel 54 took the call letters WNUV. Also signed before the station was built was a contract that would have seen the station broadcast Wometco Home Theater as its subscription service.

Construction of the station's tower in Catonsville began in April 1982, ahead of a July 1 launch. The independent station aired syndicated reruns and the Financial News Network during the day leading into the subscription service Super TV at night and on weekend afternoons. Super TV was already in business in Washington, where its scrambled programs had been airing on WCQR since November 1981. The star attraction on Super TV was a package of Baltimore Orioles baseball games. For a $20 decoder deposit, a $49 installation charge, and a $19 monthly service fee (plus an optional package of late-night adult movies), subscribers could watch the Orioles, special events, and 70 movies a month. Super TV's entry in the Baltimore market convinced competing independent WBFF (channel 45) to abandon its plans to pursue subscription programming despite receiving FCC approval, and it also accumulated 30,000 subscribers in Baltimore (alongside 55,000 more in greater Washington) within a year of starting up. The ad-supported portion of the station also experimented with some local programming, such as a daily newsmagazine, Say Baltimore, that aired in 1984.

However, as the early 1980s progressed, subscription television would experience headwinds nationally due to a recession and the development of cable television in major cities. As early as January 1984, WNUV general manager Mark Salditch realized that Super TV likely was not going to be around much longer and began preparing the station for a future without subscription programming. For the 1984–85 television season, channel 54 overhauled its daytime schedule to be more typical for a general-entertainment independent, and the station launched a promotion campaign to make viewers aware that it offered more than subscription programming. One element of the revamped channel 54 was a series of "Pet of the Day" station IDs featuring the dogs, cats, and birds of regional viewers, an idea taken from KTZO in San Francisco.

In October 1985, Subscription Television of Greater Washington, which owned Super TV, announced it would cease broadcasting over WCQR in Washington at year's end and retune subscribers' equipment to receive WNUV if they fell within its coverage area. However, the number of subscribers continued to fall rapidly, from 28,000 in late 1985 to 14,000 in early 1986. As a result of the company's failure and WNUV's desire to become a full-time commercial independent, Super TV broadcast for the last time on March 31, 1986.

=== Going full-time independent ===
With Super TV no longer broadcasting, WNUV overhauled its evening programming and made aggressive moves in an effort to become what Salditch called "the Cadillac of independents". Later that year, the station picked up The Tonight Show Starring Johnny Carson, an NBC program not cleared by WMAR-TV; the program had previously aired on WBFF, which dropped Carson to make room for The Late Show Starring Joan Rivers.

New-Vision sold WNUV to a company formed by Boston investors Andrew Banks and Royce Yudkoff in a deal announced in December 1988. Banks and Yudkoff formed ABRY Communications—named from their initials. The FCC approved their purchase in March 1989, and the new owners embarked on a campaign to upgrade the station's transmitting equipment; the power levels that had been adequate for specially designed antennas as an STV station were insufficient for typical over-the-air receiving equipment. In addition, ABRY moved its corporate headquarters to Baltimore. ABRY also aimed to capitalize on WBFF's commitment to the expanding Fox network to case channel 54 as Baltimore's only true independent station. It launched a campaign allowing the public to vote on programs for its schedule, a promotional tool successful enough that ABRY duplicated it in relaunching KSMO-TV in Kansas City in 1991.

In 1994, WNUV picked up the broadcast rights to some Baltimore Orioles games produced by Home Team Sports. The station showed Orioles games through 2006, sharing what ultimately was a package of 65 over-the-air telecasts with WJZ-TV; only WJZ-TV carried games in 2007. From 1993 to 1994, the station aired Late Show with David Letterman in lieu of WBAL-TV, which declined to carry the show.

=== Sale to Glencairn, Ltd. ===
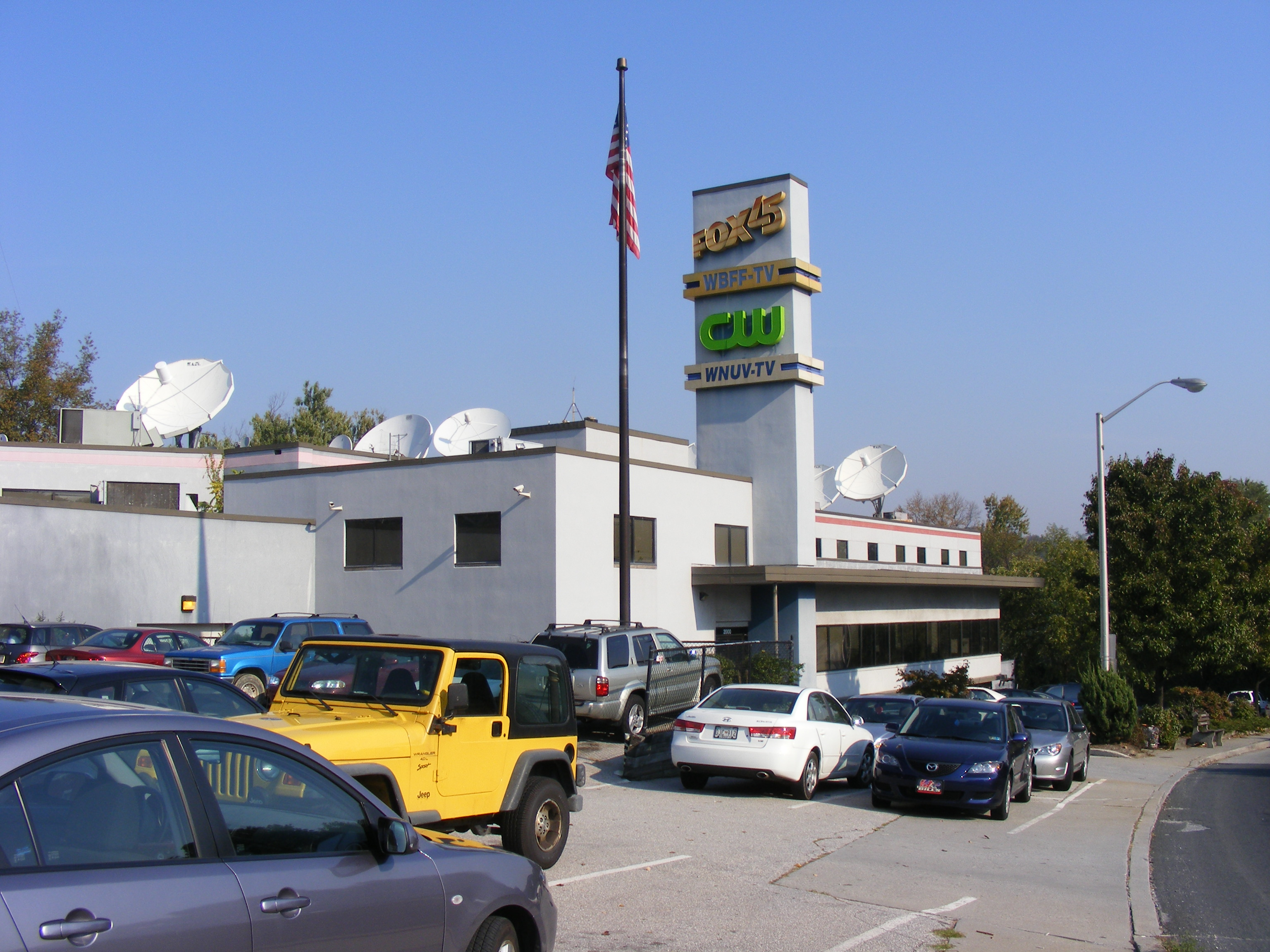
WNUV operates from WBFF's studio in Baltimore.

In August 1993, ABRY announced that it had sold two stations—WNUV and WVTV in Milwaukee, the latter of which it managed and held an option to buy—to Edwin "Eddie" Edwards, who already owned WPTT in Pittsburgh. The deal concerned some in the broadcasting industry. Edwards had a close connection to Sinclair Broadcast Group; he had previously worked for the company, and in Pittsburgh, Edwards brokered most of WPTT's broadcast day to Sinclair. The move represented some turnabout given that two years prior, when Edwards bought WPTT so that Sinclair could purchase Pittsburgh Fox affiliate WPGH-TV, ABRY had filed through a third party a petition to deny on the transaction, alleging that Sinclair exercised continued control by way of seller financing. It had explicitly done so through counsel in fear that Sinclair would retaliate by encouraging program suppliers to bypass WNUV in favor of WBFF. In addition, some program syndicators fretted that possible Sinclair combinations such as WBFF–WNUV gave the company excessive leverage over the buying of syndicated shows in those markets.

Scripps-Howard Broadcasting, owner of WMAR-TV, filed a petition to deny on the transfer of WNUV to Edwards in October. It charged that Edwards and Carolyn Smith (née Cunningham), the mother of the four Smith brothers that owned Sinclair, were being used by the brothers as a vehicle to create what in essence would be a duopoly—ownership of two TV stations in a market—which at the time was not allowed by the FCC. It cited the structure of the proposed buyer's parent company. While Edwards was the only voting shareholder in Glencairn, Ltd., 70 percent of the non-voting shares in the firm were held by Carolyn Smith, and Scripps's petition to deny also pointed to prior business dealings between her and Sinclair as well as to a proposed local marketing agreement (LMA) to allow Sinclair to manage WNUV's affairs. The Scripps petition was dismissed by Edwards as an attempt to set up roadblocks to Black ownership of broadcasters and as retaliation for a 1991 challenge by the Smiths to WMAR-TV's broadcast license.

The original application for Glencairn to purchase WNUV was withdrawn in April 1994, but ABRY continued to express interest in selling the station to Sinclair. ABRY then signed an LMA directly with Sinclair for WNUV and WVTV, concurrently with the company selling two stations outright to the firm. With the LMA in place, Scripps ultimately decided that continued protest was pointless and dropped its objection to a revised version of the sale, leading to WNUV becoming a Glencairn property.

=== Affiliations with UPN and The WB ===
WBFF–WNUV management opted to affiliate channel 54 with the United Paramount Network (UPN) over The WB when both networks began in January 1995 because UPN had more conventional affiliation agreements, specifying network compensation payments, than The WB. That network was forced to settle for coverage on local cable systems and a low-power UHF station, Towson State Television.

However, on July 21, 1997, Sinclair signed an affiliation agreement with The WB to switch the affiliations of WNUV and four other UPN affiliates to the network. The move put UPN on the back foot; the network contested the validity of the action in Maryland courts, where it lost twice. WNUV became a WB affiliate on January 18, 1998. One of UPN's corporate parents, United Television, acquired home shopping outlet WHSW (channel 24) and hastily relaunched it as WUTB to give the network a continued presence in Baltimore.

The relationship between Sinclair and Glencairn received renewed attention in 1999, when the company sought to acquire more stations and the FCC detected contradictions in its financial representations. By this time, Edwards only owned three percent of Glencairn's equity, with the rest being held by Carolyn Smith and trusts for the benefit of her grandchildren. In December 2001, Sinclair was fined $40,000 by the FCC for illegally controlling Glencairn. Sinclair filed to acquire WNUV outright from the company, renamed Cunningham Broadcasting, in 2002; it attempted again in 2003, when it appeared that the FCC would remove a restriction only allowing new duopolies in markets with more than eight independent TV station owners (which Baltimore lacked).

In 2006, The WB and UPN were shut down and replaced with The CW, which offered programming from both predecessor networks. However, Sinclair was late to sign an agreement with the network. The news of the merger resulted in Sinclair announcing, two months later, that most of its UPN and WB affiliates would join MyNetworkTV, a new service formed by the News Corporation, which was also owner of the Fox network; the core stations for this effort were Fox's UPN stations, including WUTB. It was not until May 2, 2006, that Sinclair entered into a deal to affiliate WNUV and five other stations it operated with The CW.

=== Testing new technologies ===
Since the late 1990s, Sinclair has used WNUV as a testing ground for new television transmission technologies. Sinclair was the first Baltimore broadcaster to start airing digital simulcasts of its stations, with WBFF and WNUV both beginning digital broadcasts on February 27, 1998. WNUV's analog signal on UHF channel 54 was shut down on February 17, 2009, the original target date on which full-power television stations in the United States were to transition from analog to digital broadcasts under federal mandate (which was later pushed back to June 12). The station's digital signal remained on its pre-transition UHF channel 40, using virtual channel 54.

In July 2009, Washington, D.C.-area TV stations became a test market for Mobile DTV, and WNUV was one of the participating stations.

WNUV received FCC authorization in 2013 to begin conducting tests of the OFDM-based DVB-T2 terrestrial television standard and other future television broadcast standards, with the aim of identifying the feasibility of next-generation standards for mobile device usage and 4K ultra HD; the experimental broadcasts began on the morning of March 27, 2013. The tests ran between 1 a.m. and 5 a.m. and did not interrupt cable reception; the lost programs were aired on a subchannel of WBFF.

As a part of the repacking process following the 2016-2017 FCC incentive auction, WNUV was reassigned to UHF channel 25 and was to relocate by March 2020. Because it did not have to wait for any other stations to move first, WNUV moved to channel 25 on September 1, 2018, to allow new spectrum licensee T-Mobile to begin operations.

WNUV's signal became the Baltimore market's ATSC 3.0 (NextGen TV) lighthouse station on June 24, 2021. As required by FCC rules, WNUV's existing ATSC 1.0 channels relocated to other stations in the market to preserve service to existing ATSC 1.0 receivers. In November 2022, Sinclair signed a memorandum of understanding with South Korean automaker Hyundai for development of ATSC 3.0 technologies in the automotive industry; WNUV began broadcasting information to support a demonstration of an in-car entertainment platform being conducted at a Hyundai dealership in Baltimore.

== Newscasts ==
WNUV launched a 6:30 p.m. newscast in March 1997 called UPN 54 News at 6:30 (changed to WB 54 News at 6:30 in January 1998). The newscast shared the same news set and anchors as WBFF's 10 p.m. newscast; the idea of news in this evening time slot had been first floated in 1995. In January 2005, Sinclair replaced WNUV's 6:30 p.m. newscast with a new half-hour early evening newscast on WBFF, airing at 5:30 p.m. weeknights.

== Technical information and subchannels ==
WNUV offers four subchannels, which are broadcast under hosting arrangements by four Baltimore TV stations. Uniquely, the main CW subchannel is broadcast from two Maryland Public Television transmitters: WMPT (Annapolis) with virtual channel 54.1 and WMPB (Baltimore) with virtual channel 54.11. This is a quirk resulting from FCC rules which require any ATSC 3.0 station to use channel-sharing to maintain ATSC 1.0 service of its primary subchannel to 95% of its previous coverage area; WNUV could not reach a channel-sharing agreement with any in-market station which provides adequate coverage due to capacity limits, and it was found that neither MPT station alone reached the threshold.

Subchannels provided by WNUV (ATSC 1.0)
Subchannel	Res.	Short name	Programming	ATSC 1.0 host
54.1	720p	CWWNUV	The CW	WMPT and WMPB
54.2	480i	Antenna	Antenna TV (4:3)	WMAR-TV
54.3	480i	Comet	Comet	WBAL-TV
54.4	480i	TheNest	The Nest	WBAL-TV

=== ATSC 3.0 lighthouse service ===
In turn, WNUV broadcasts most of the market's major stations in ATSC 3.0 format. The transmitter is on Television Hill in the Woodberry neighborhood of north Baltimore.

Subchannels of WNUV (ATSC 3.0)
Subchannel	Res.	Short name	Programming
2.1	720p	WMAR	ABC (WMAR-TV)
11.1	1080i	WBAL	NBC (WBAL-TV)
22.1	1080i	WMPT	PBS (WMPT)
45.1	720p	WBFF	Fox (WBFF)
45.10	1080p	T2	T2
45.11	1080p	PBTV	Pickleballtv
54.1	720p	WNUV	The CW

Subchannel broadcast with digital rights management
Subchannel streamed via the Internet
