= Spencer Christian =

American television broadcaster

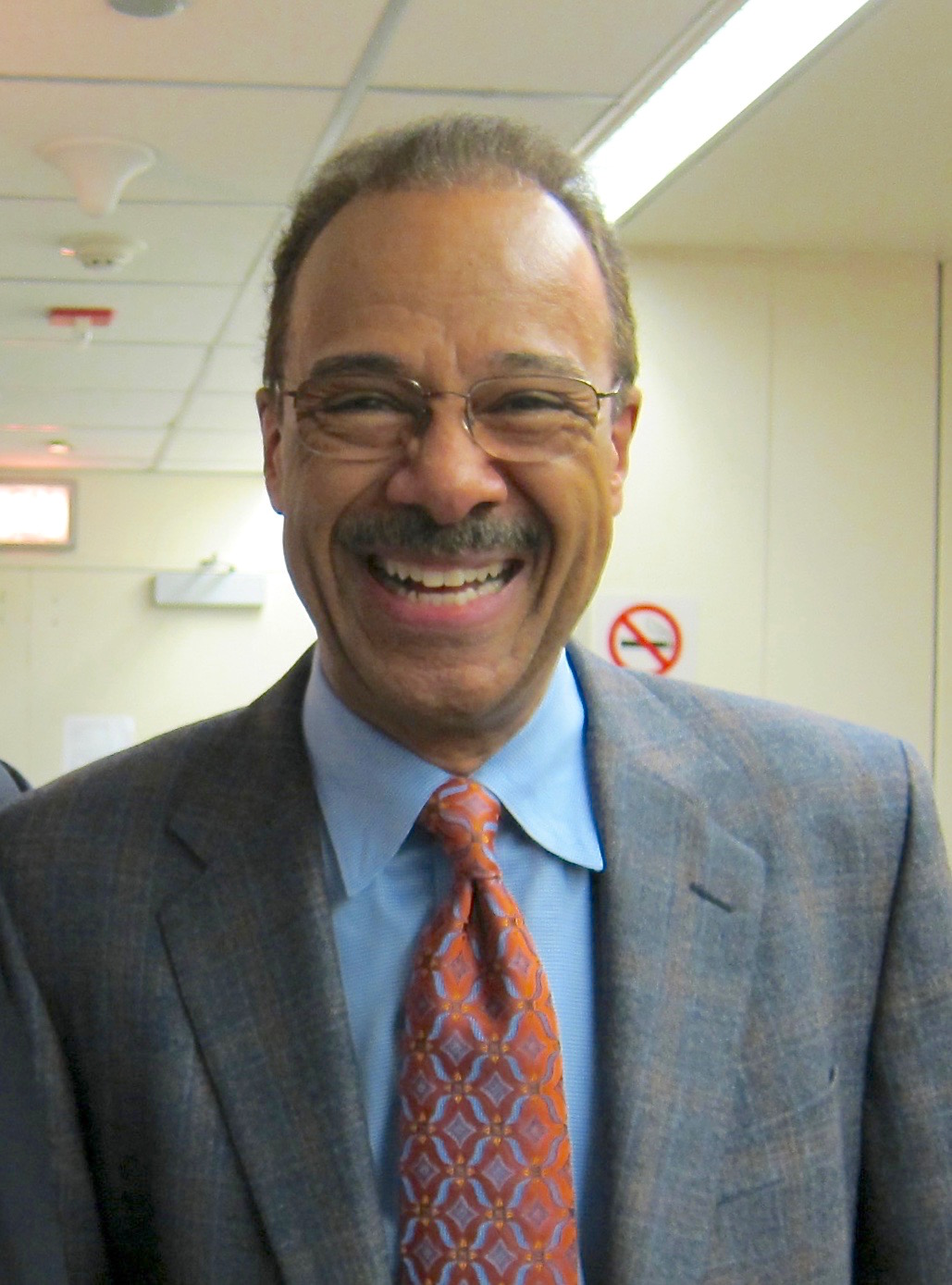
- Spencer Christian in 2012.
- Born: July 23, 1947 (age 79); Newport News, Virginia, United States
- Other names: E. Spencer Christian, Jr.
- Education: B.A. English, Journalism
- Alma mater: Hampton University
- Occupations: Broadcaster, journalist, author
- Years active: 1971-present
- Employer(s): KGO-TV (ABC7), San Francisco
- Known for: Good Morning America (1986-1998); The View from the Bay (2006-2010)
- Spouse(s): Diane Chambers (1970-2000); Lynette Courtney (2007-present)

Spencer Christian (born July 23, 1947) is an American television broadcaster, best known as the former weather forecaster for ABC's Good Morning America from 1986 to 1998. He currently is the weather forecaster for ABC-owned KGO-TV in San Francisco. Christian is also the author of several children's books.

== Biography ==
Christian was born in Newport News, Virginia in 1947. He began his broadcasting career at WWBT in Richmond, Virginia as a news reporter, covering state and local politics, the public school system, and landmark cases in the Fourth US Circuit Court of Appeals. His first stint as a weatherman came in 1975, in Baltimore, Maryland, when he was hired by news director Ron Kershaw at WBAL-TV to join the station's Action News team which included Sue Simmons, Mike Hambrick, Ron Smith, Curt Anderson and Joe Krebs.

From there, Christian moved to New York City's WABC-TV, where he served as a general assignment reporter, weatherman and sportscaster for Eyewitness News from 1977 to 1986. In August 1986, Christian joined Good Morning America as their weather forecaster. In addition, he occasionally traveled throughout the United States and abroad, reporting on a wide range of topics from current events to human interest stories.

From 1992 to 1993, Christian was also seen on the BET cable network as the host of the music game show Triple Threat.

For decades, Christian had a serious gambling addiction. He describes his addiction and his recovery in his 2018 book, You Bet Your Life: How I Survived Jim Crow Racism, Hurricane Chasing, and Gambling.

Christian left Good Morning America at the end of 1998 and was replaced by longtime friend Tony Perkins and began doing weather forecasts at KGO-TV in San Francisco, California in January 1999, a position he holds to this day. He was host of HGTV's Spencer Christian's Wine Cellar from 1995 to 1999.

Christian has also hosted the PBS train series Tracks Ahead since 1997. In 2006, he began hosting the popular afternoon show in San Francisco, The View from the Bay. In June, 2014, Christian temporarily returned to the set of Good Morning America as a substitute weather forecaster while Ginger Zee was having her wedding. He also returned on November 19, 2015, to celebrate the 40th Anniversary of Good Morning America.

In 1996, Christian appeared in a music video of the song Change Like the Weather by Bounty Killa (feat. Busta Rhymes and Junior Reid).

He is a member of the Beta chapter of Iota Phi Theta fraternity.

== Bibliography ==
Spencer Christian co-authored the following books with Antonia Felix:

- Can it Really Rain Frogs: The World's Strangest Weather Events, 1997, ISBN 978-0471152903
- Is There a Dinosaur in Your Backyard: The World's Most Fascinating Fossils, Rocks, and Minerals, 1998, ISBN 978-0471196167
- Shake, Rattle, and Roll: The World's Most Amazing Volcanoes, Earthquakes, and Other Forces, 1997, ISBN 978-0471152910
- What Makes the Grand Canyon Grand? The World's Most Awe-Inspiring Natural Wonders, 1997, ISBN 978-0471196174

With co-author Tom Biracree, he wrote:

- Electing Our Government: Everything You Need to Know to Make Your Vote Really Count, 1996, ISBN 978-0312143244

He also wrote:

- Spencer Christian's Geography Book, 1995, ISBN 978-0312131807
- Spencer Christian's You Bet Your Life: How I Survived Jim Crow Racism, Hurricane Chasing, and Gambling, 2018, ISBN 978-1682616390
