= WBAL-TV =

Television station in Baltimore

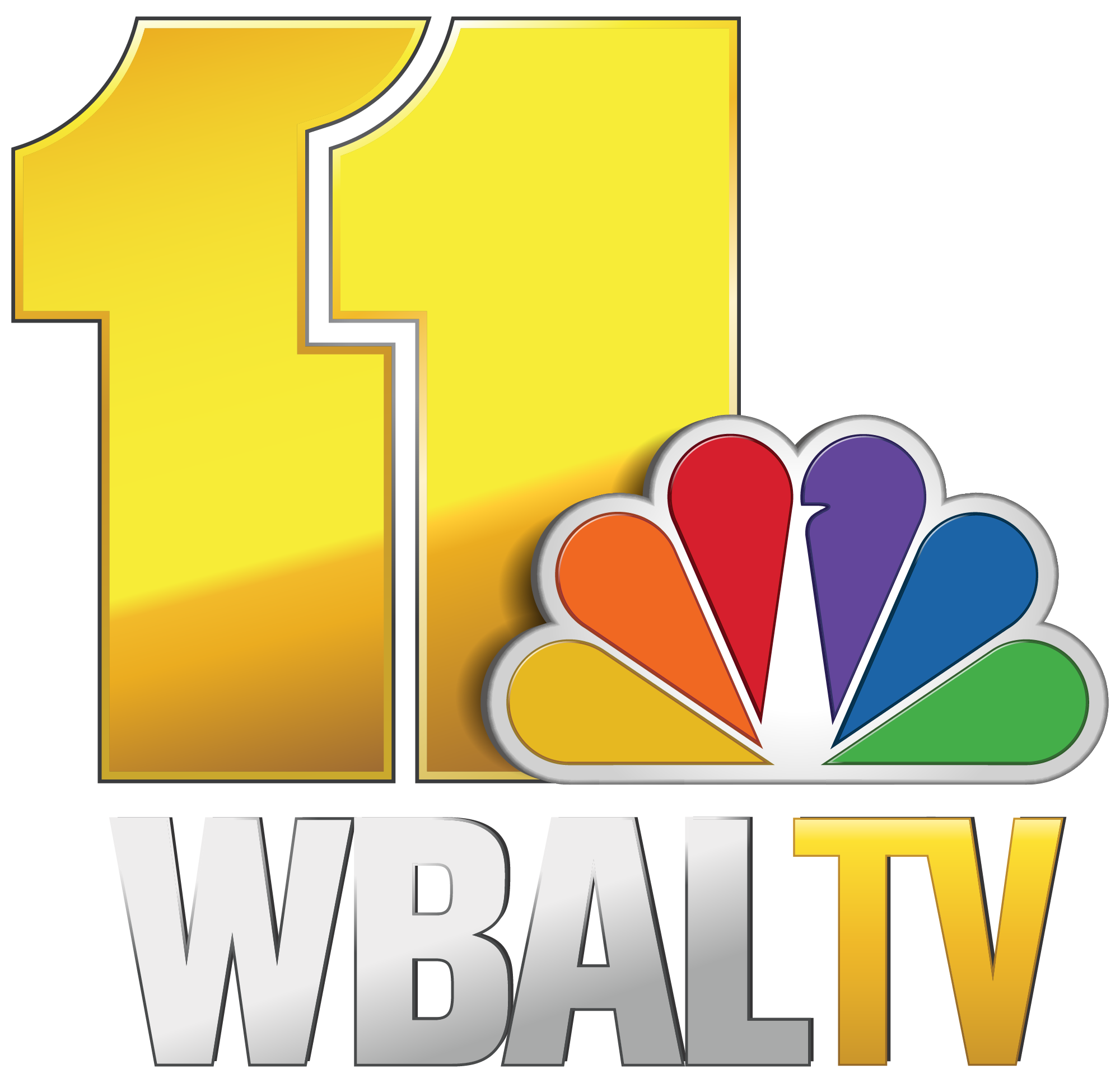
- Baltimore-Annapolis, Maryland; United States
- Channels: Digital: 12 (VHF); Virtual: 11
- Branding: WBAL-TV 11; 11 News; MeTV Baltimore (11.2)

Programming
- Affiliations: 11.1: NBC; for others, see § Subchannels

Ownership
- Owner: Hearst Television; (WBAL Hearst Television Inc.)
- Sister stations: WBAL, WIYY

History
- Founded: May 1946
- First air date: March 11, 1948
- Former channel numbers: Analog: 11 (VHF, 1948–2009); Digital: 59 (UHF, 1998–2009), 11 (VHF, 2009–2020)
- Former affiliations: NBC (1948–1981); CBS (1981–1995)
- Call sign meaning: Baltimore

Technical information
- Licensing authority: FCC
- Facility ID: 65696
- ERP: 30 kW
- HAAT: 305 m (1,001 ft)
- Transmitter coordinates: 39°20′5″N 76°39′2″W

Links
- Public license information: Public file; LMS
- Website: www.wbaltv.com

WBAL-TV (channel 11) is a television station in Baltimore, Maryland, United States, affiliated with NBC. It is the flagship property of Hearst Television, which has owned the station since its inception, and is sister to the company's sole radio properties, WBAL (1090 AM) and WIYY (97.9 FM). The three outlets share studios and offices on Television Hill in the Woodberry section of Baltimore, near the transmission tower that WBAL-TV also shares with WIYY and several other Baltimore television and radio stations.

== History ==
=== Early history ===
WBAL-TV began operations on March 11, 1948, from its original studios on North Charles Street in Downtown Baltimore. It is the second television station in Maryland, after WMAR-TV (channel 2). The station's parent, the Hearst Corporation, also owned WBAL radio and two local newspapers, the afternoon daily Baltimore News-Post and The Baltimore American on Sundays–which later merged as the News American in 1965 before shutting down in 1986.

WBAL-TV is one of two Hearst-owned broadcast properties to have been built and signed on by the company (the other being WTAE-TV in Pittsburgh), and the oldest to be continuously owned by Hearst through its various television subsidiaries through the years. At its launch, WBAL-TV was an NBC affiliate, owing to its radio sister's long affiliation with the NBC's radio networks.

Early programming on channel 11 included Musical Almanac, Look and Cook and Know Baltimore, along with news and sports productions. In the 1950s, the station introduced Romper Room, a children's program produced locally by Bert and Nancy Claster that eventually became a nationally franchised and syndicated program. Another long-running show of the 1950s was the weekday Quiz Club, co-hosted by local personalities Brent Gunts and Jay Grayson. Baltimore Sun local history columnist Jacques Kelly described it at the time of Grayson's death in June 2000, as "pure 1950s live television ... executed on a low budget ... the genial hosts ... ruled the 1 p.m. airwaves".

WBAL-TV produced several local bowling shows in the 1960s and early 1970s, including Strikes and Spares, Pinbusters, Duckpins and Dollars, Bowling for Dollars and Spare Time. The station even went as far as building and installing several "duckpin" bowling alleys at its studios. It also launched several children's entertainment shows during this period, such as Rhea and Sunshine, Pete the Pirate, P. W. Doodle, Heads Up, and the teen-oriented rock and roll music and the mid-1960s teen dancing on the Kerby Scott Show which introduced its "mod" fashions and "hippie" culture style of rock music to the area.

WBAL-TV has boasted many television firsts, including becoming the first Baltimore television station to broadcast in color, the first station in Maryland (and the eighth in the world) to acquire a videocassette machine (of the U-Matic format); the first station in Baltimore to acquire a mobile satellite news-gathering system (dubbed "NEWSTAR 11") and the first Baltimore station to hire an African-American news anchor and a Black news director.

In the late 1970s, ABC steadily rose in the ratings to become the number one network in prime time. Accordingly, the network began to seek upgrades to its slate of affiliates, which included some stations that either had poor signals or poorly performing local programming. WBAL-TV was invited to switch to ABC in 1977, but opted to remain with NBC out of concerns about the poor ratings for ABC's then-recently revamped evening newscasts (a situation that would be improved in the coming years).

=== Switch to CBS ===
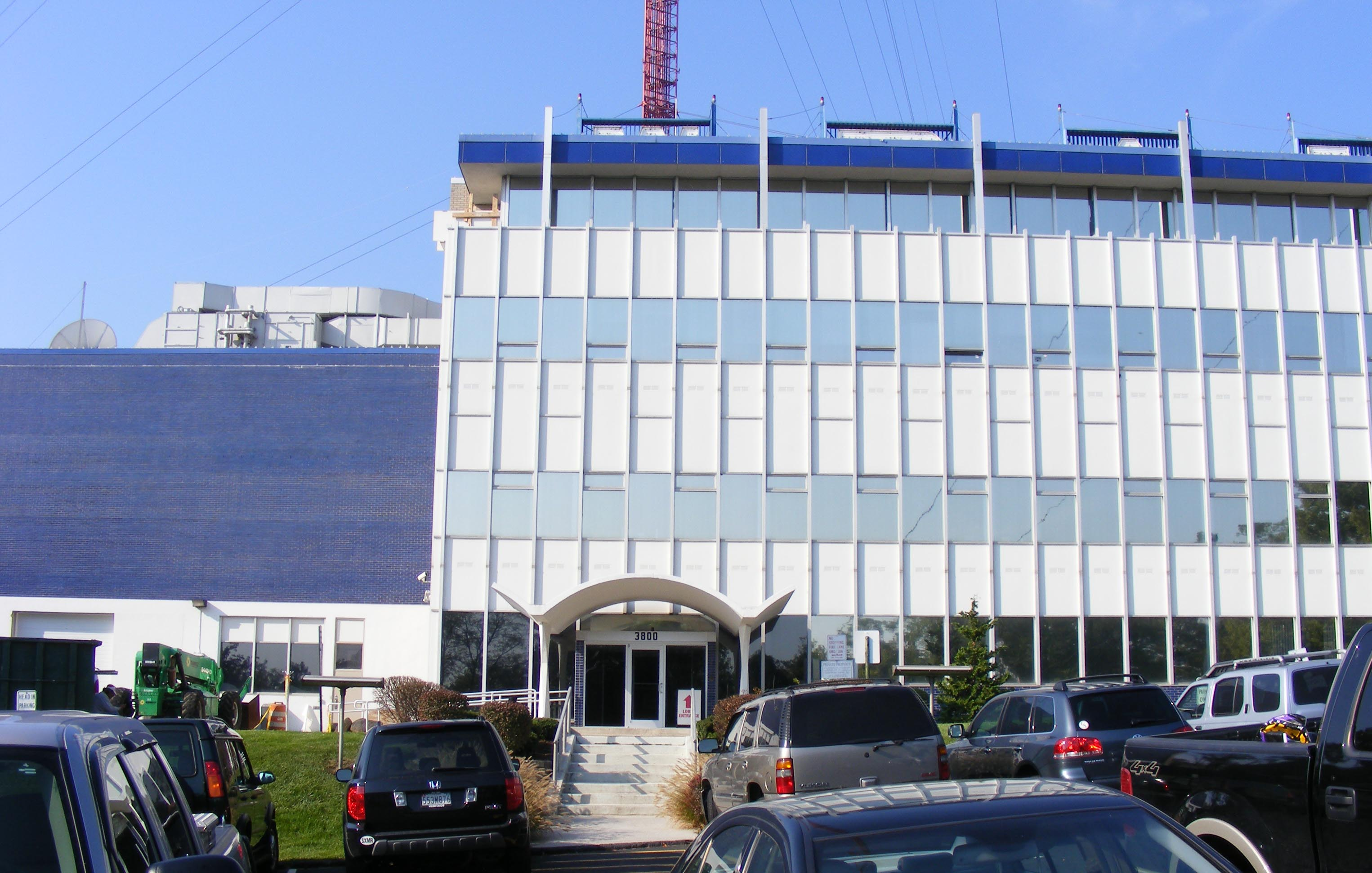
The WBAL-TV modernistic glass walled studio and offices facility with huge call sign letters on the roof, visible from passing on the Jones Falls Expressway (Interstate 83), on "Television Hill" near Woodberry in north-central Baltimore, opened in 1962.

On March 3, 1981, CBS announced that it would be ending its 33-year affiliation with WMAR-TV, then owned by the A. S. Abell Company (then-publishers of the Baltimore Sun), and moving its programming to WBAL-TV. Among its reasons for making the switch, CBS cited channel 11's strength in local news ratings and overall non-network programming as opposed to WMAR-TV, which heavily preempted the network in favor of syndicated programs, local public affairs and sports coverage; CBS also cited low ratings for WMAR's newscasts. WBAL-TV's first stint as an NBC affiliate ended on August 30, 1981, when the two station exchanged networks–the first affiliation swap to occur in Baltimore. The last NBC program to air on channel 11 until 1995 was a rerun from the evening before the switch of the first episode of Saturday Night Live, with host George Carlin.

=== Return to NBC ===
On June 16, 1994, the E. W. Scripps Company, present owners of WMAR-TV, negotiated with ABC to affiliate with its Baltimore station as part of a multi-station deal also involving KNXV-TV in Phoenix and WFTS-TV in Tampa. ABC agreed to the deal as a condition of retaining its affiliations with WXYZ-TV in Detroit and WEWS-TV in Cleveland; CBS was seeking to affiliate with both of those stations, as it was about to lose current affiliates WJBK and WJW to Fox in a separate affiliation deal with New World Communications. The move left NBC without a Baltimore affiliate and incumbent ABC affiliate WJZ-TV (channel 13) without a network; one month later, CBS and Westinghouse Broadcasting (Group W) formed a partnership which renewed the network's affiliations with Westinghouse-owned KDKA-TV in Pittsburgh and KPIX-TV in San Francisco and caused WJZ-TV and two other Westinghouse-owned NBC affiliates, WBZ-TV in Boston and KYW-TV in Philadelphia, to switch their affiliations to CBS (Westinghouse would eventually acquire CBS in November 1995).

Having lost the CBS affiliation to WJZ-TV, WBAL-TV had the choice of affiliating with either NBC or Fox. On July 27, 1994, NBC announced that it would move to WBAL-TV, with station management citing NBC's sports programming as a factor; Fox would remain on its existing affiliate, WBFF (channel 45). Channel 11 rejoined NBC on January 2, 1995; it had sought to make the switch on August 29, 1994, in time for the new television season, but Group W and CBS agreed to not make the switch until January. In the interim, any CBS shows WBAL turned down would air on WJZ-TV instead, while WBAL aired NBC programs preempted by WMAR-TV. The final CBS program to air on channel 11 before it rejoined NBC was the made-for-TV movie A Father for Charlie at 9 p.m. Eastern Time; this was directly preceded by an hour-long program explaining the switch, which preempted an airing of the Chicago Hope episode "Heartbreak" (which could still be viewed in much of the market via WUSA in Washington).

== Programming ==
=== Preemptions and deferrals ===
During its initial run as an NBC affiliate, WBAL-TV preempted the first season of Saturday Night Live (which was titled NBC's Saturday Night) because of concerns regarding its fairly edgy content for the time; instead, the station aired movies in the comedy show's time slot throughout that season; those in Baltimore who sought to view the program at the time could view it on NBC O&O WRC-TV in Washington, which was available over-the-air in most of the adjacent area. When it cleared the network's entire late night Saturday lineup in the summer of 1976, the station purchased it mainly for the monthly newsmagazine Weekend, on which the sketch program's Weekend Update segments are based, and which NBC insisted the station pick up alongside SNL as part of a package deal. The program began running on the station—initially for a trial period—on August 14, 1976, with WBAL-TV airing a disclaimer before the program warning that it contained mature material.

As a CBS affiliate, WBAL-TV preempted an hour of the network's daytime schedule every day, as well as half of its Saturday morning cartoon lineup. Channel 11 also did not run CBS' late night programming. Baltimore viewers who wanted to see the entire CBS lineup could be able to view those programs through WDVM-TV/WUSA in Washington, which, as with WRC-TV, was available over-the-air in most of the adjacent Baltimore area and preempted little network programming. The station also preempted Late Show with David Letterman in favor of continuing with The Arsenio Hall Show when it debuted in the fall of 1993; in response, CBS arranged for WNUV to carry the Letterman series instead.

WBAL-TV is one of the few NBC affiliates that do not air the fourth hour of Today (which can be seen in the area via NBC O&O WRC-TV in Washington).

=== Sports programming ===
In 1970, when the then-Baltimore Colts moved to the newly formed and realigned American Football Conference as part of the AFL–NFL merger of professional football of 1970, WBAL-TV displaced WMAR-TV (which had aired most of the team's games since 1956) as the station of record for the team (as NBC was the rightsholder for all AFC games). During its first season as such, the station provided coverage of the Colts' victory in Super Bowl V in 1971. This partnership continued until 1981, when WMAR-TV became the team's unofficial home station again for their last three seasons in Baltimore (although the station continued to air Colts games in those three seasons, they were limited to home interconference contests). When the reorganized Baltimore Ravens began play in 1996 after moving the old Cleveland Browns franchise to Maryland, WBAL-TV became the new team's station of record, but only for two seasons; in 1998, most games were moved to WJZ-TV. Presently, WBAL-TV airs any Ravens games when they play on NBC's Sunday Night Football and on Monday Night Football contests exclusive to ESPN, the latter being a benefit of Hearst's 20 percent ownership of ESPN.

The station aired any Baltimore Orioles baseball games as part of NBC's broadcast contract with Major League Baseball from the establishment of the new Orioles franchise in 1954 (move of the old St. Louis Browns to the city) until 1981; it also aired all of the Orioles' postseason games through NBC's limited contract from 1995 to 2000. During its time as a CBS station, WBAL-TV also broadcast select games involving the Orioles through CBS's MLB broadcast contract from 1990 to 1993. From 1964 until his retirement in 1995, Vince Bagli was WBAL-TV's sportscaster. His colleagues at the station called him the "Dean of Baltimore Sports".

=== News operation ===
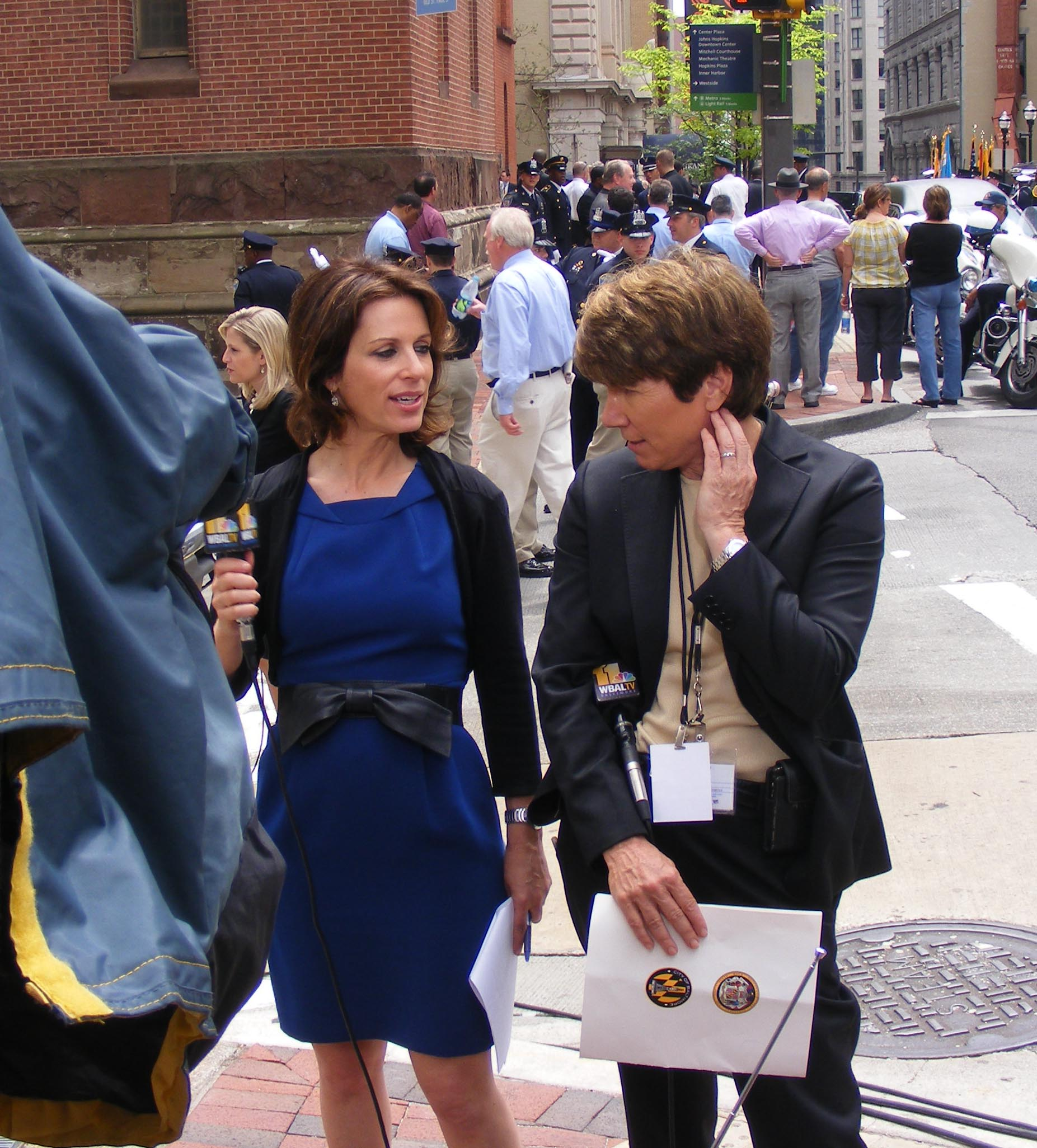
WBAL-TV, Channel 11 longtime reporters Deborah Weiner and Jayne Miller prepare for a live shot outside old St. Paul's Church (Episcopal) at North Charles and East Saratoga Streets during the funeral there of former Baltimore City Mayor, Maryland Governor, and Comptroller William Donald Schaefer, April 27, 2011

WBAL-TV presently broadcasts 35 hours of locally produced newscasts each week (with five hours each weekday, 4 1/2 hours on Saturdays and 5 1/2 hours on Sundays); the station also produces a weekly public affairs program on Sunday mornings called 11 TV Hill.

Appropriately for a station with roots in a newspaper, channel 11 has a rich news tradition. WBAL's newscasts have spent the better part of its history in either first or second place in the ratings. It led the ratings from the 1960s until WJZ-TV passed it in the early 1970s. However, for the better part of the last 40 years, WBAL-TV had waged a spirited battle for first place in the ratings with WJZ-TV. In recent years, WBAL-TV's newscasts placed first at 5, 6 and 11 p.m. However, in the November 2009 Nielsen ratings sweeps period—the first since the debut of The Jay Leno Show—WBAL's 11 p.m. newscast fell precipitously from first to a distant second behind WJZ (by contrast, the 11 p.m. newscast on WRC-TV in nearby Washington, D.C. was one of the least affected late-night newscasts of any NBC affiliate or owned-and-operated station in the country; it continued to dominate its competitors). WBAL still continued to lead at 5 and 6 p.m. until the November 2011 sweeps period. Since NBC took Leno off of prime time in February 2010—in part due to complaints from WBAL and other affiliates about effects on its newscasts—viewership of channel 11's late newscast has often come close to the WJZ newscast. However, since the November 2011 sweeps period, WJZ's newscasts took the lead in nearly all time slots but WBAL is still a strong second.

In 1974, WBAL introduced the Action News format to Baltimore. Characterized by short, usually 90 second, news "packages" and upbeat introductory news themes, Baltimore's Action News briefly replaced WJZ as the number one news station in Baltimore during the mid-1970s. The architect of the success was news director Ron Kershaw, who had come to Baltimore from Texas and was considered somewhat ahead of his time. He brought in talented anchors like Sue Simmons and Spencer Christian but also replaced long-time local news anchor Rolf Hertsgaard with controversial out-of-towner Don Harrison and streamlined the news operation. Kershaw later brought other innovations to WNBC-TV in New York City and WBBM-TV in Chicago as news director at those stations.

WBAL-TV lent then-meteorologist Sandra Shaw to Hearst sister station WDSU-TV in New Orleans on September 1, 2008, to assist with the Louisiana station's coverage of Hurricane Gustav.

On January 3, 2009, WBAL-TV became the second station in Baltimore (behind WBFF) to begin broadcasting its local news programming in high definition. Only the in-studio cameras and footage from the station's helicopter were in HD at the time of the switch. For over a year, most field reports were still in pillarboxed 4:3 standard definition. Most field reports are switched from 16:9 widescreen enhanced definition to 16:9 high definition in March 2012. On March 5, 2012, WBAL debuted a half-hour 10 p.m. newscast on its WBAL Plus digital subchannel, which competes against an hour-long newscast on WBFF.

On January 12, 2015, WBAL-TV expanded their morning newscast 11 News Today to 4:30 a.m.

News anchor Rod Daniels retired from WBAL-TV in 2015 after more than 30 years with the station.

==== Awards and achievements ====
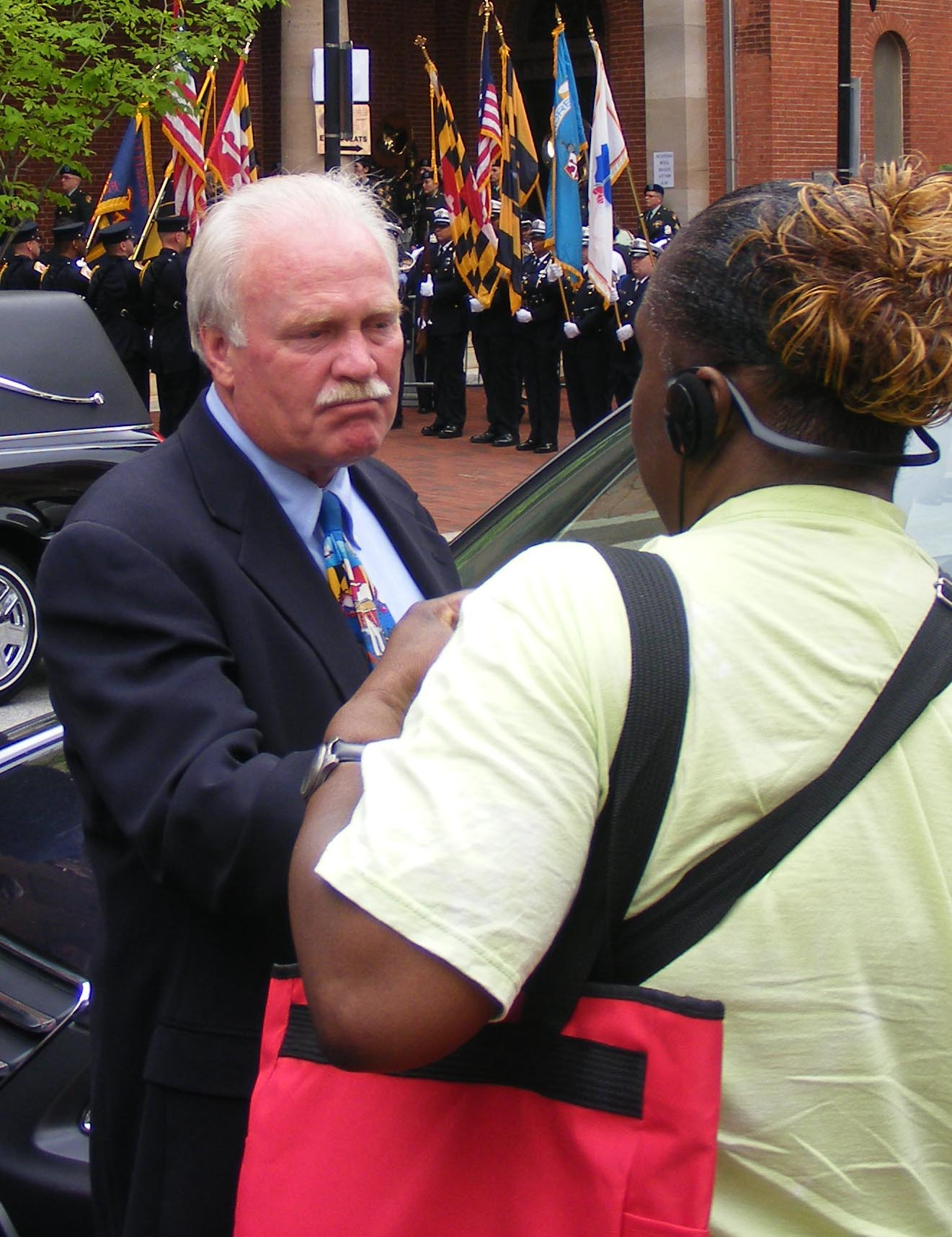
Former WBAL-TV reporter Rob Roblin, April 27, 2011.

WBAL-TV became the first Baltimore television station to win a Peabody Award for local news coverage, specifically of their Chesapeake Bay pollution investigation (and the first Baltimore television station to win the award in any category in more than fifty years). WBAL's news department was also awarded as one of the top three Best Television Newscasts by the National Headliners Association, alongside WFAA in Dallas, and WBAL's Boston sister station WCVB-TV. The station has also won regional Edward R. Murrow Awards, the George Polk Award and the American Bar Association Gavel Award for excellence in reporting and journalism; it has also been rated the most outstanding television news operation in Baltimore (by the Associated Press and United Press International).

==== Notable former on-air staff ====
- Curt Anderson
- Sade Baderinwa
- Campbell Brown
- Ron Canada – newscaster (1970s–early 1980s)
- Spencer Christian
- Carol Costello
- Rod Daniels (1984–2015)
- Mike Hambrick
- Vicki Mabrey
- Royal Parker (1962–mid-1990s)
- Lisa Salters
- Gerry Sandusky — Sports Director (1988–2026)
- Sue Simmons
- Ron Smith
- Julius Westheimer (1916–2005) – financial and business news/commentary

== Technical information ==
=== Subchannels ===
The station's signal is multiplexed:

Subchannels of WBAL-TV
Subchannel	Res.	Short name	Programming
11.1	1080i	WBAL-DT	NBC
11.2	480i	MeTV	MeTV
11.3	480i	Story	Story Television
11.4	480i	GetTV	Great
11.5	480i	QVC	QVC
54.3	480i	Comet	Comet (WNUV)
54.4	480i	TheNest	The Nest (WNUV)

Subchannel broadcast with MPEG-4 video
Broadcast on behalf of another station

WBAL-TV carries a digital subchannel on 11.2, which launched in August 2005 as "11 Insta-Weather Plus", an affiliate of NBC Weather Plus until the network folded in November 2008; after that, the subchannel carried automated local and regional weather information provided by NBC Plus until April 2009, when an alternate programming format was adopted featuring local weather information, newscasts and other special programming. On March 5, 2012, WBAL launched a 10 p.m. newscast on the subchannel (which was renamed "WBAL Plus" the previous year).

On July 24, 2012, Hearst Television renewed its affiliation agreement with MeTV through 2015, to maintain existing affiliations with eight Hearst-owned stations that were already carrying the digital multicast network. As part of the renewal, Hearst also signed agreements to add the network as digital subchannels of WBAL-TV and sister stations KCRA-TV in Sacramento, WCVB-TV in Boston, KOCO-TV in Oklahoma City and WXII-TV in Greensboro. MeTV was added to subchannel 11.2 on September 10, 2012.

=== Analog-to-digital conversion ===
WBAL-TV shut down its analog signal, over VHF channel 11, on June 12, 2009, the official date on which full-power television stations in the United States transitioned from analog to digital broadcasts under federal mandate. The station's digital signal relocated from its pre-transition UHF channel 59, which was among the high band UHF channels (52–69) that were removed from broadcasting use as a result of the transition, to its analog-era assignment of VHF channel 11. Several VHF digital stations received permission for a power increase later that month after stations experienced signal problems as a result of changing their digital channel from UHF to VHF. WBAL-TV chose to test its equipment before making a commitment.

As a part of the repacking process following the 2016-2017 FCC incentive auction, WBAL-TV relocated to VHF channel 12 on July 2, 2020, using virtual channel 11. WJZ-TV concurrently moved to channel 11, WBAL-TV's former digital channel before the repacking.
