= Phil Sobocinski =

American football player (1945–2026)

No. 53
- Position: Center

Personal information
- Born: December 6, 1945; South Milwaukee, Wisconsin, U.S.
- Died: February 21, 2026 (aged 80)
- Listed height: 6 ft 3 in (1.91 m)
- Listed weight: 235 lb (107 kg)

Career information
- High school: South Milwaukee
- College: Wisconsin (1963-1966)
- NFL draft: 1967: undrafted

Career history
- Baltimore Colts (1967-1968)*; Atlanta Falcons (1968)
- * Offseason or practice squad member only

Career NFL statistics
- Games played: 7
- Games started: 6
- Stats at Pro Football Reference

Phillip Lee Sobocinski (December 6, 1945 – February 21, 2026) was an American professional football player who was a center for the Atlanta Falcons of the National Football League (NFL). He played college football for the Wisconsin Badgers. He played seven games in the NFL for the Falcons in 1968.

After his football career ended, he earned a PhD in educational administration and later became a school district superintendent.

Sobocinski died on February 21, 2026, at the age of 80.
