= Judd Hambrick =

American journalist

- Born: Judd F. Hambrick; Tulsa, Oklahoma, U.S.
- Occupations: radio/television news anchor, news reporter, journalist
- Years active: 1961-present

Judd Hambrick is an American former television newscaster and reporter. Hambrick grew up in Mount Pleasant, Texas.

== Biography ==
=== Career, accomplishments, and awards ===
Hambrick began his broadcasting career in radio in 1961, while still a sophomore at Mount Vernon High School in Mount Vernon, Texas, where he graduated in 1963. Hambrick then attended the University of Texas at Austin, obtaining his degree in journalism in 1967. He began his career in television news at KTBC-TV in Austin.

By 1972, Hambrick had moved on to WCAU-TV in Philadelphia and served as co-anchor of their evening news programs with John Facenda, better known outside of Philadelphia as the "voice" of NFL Films. Hambrick's stay at WCAU lasted only one year. During the next three years, he anchored at KDFW-TV in Dallas, KABC-TV in Los Angeles and KTVU in the San Francisco Bay Area.

In 1977, Hambrick arrived in Cleveland, Ohio, where he became an anchor of the evening newscasts on WJKW-TV (now WJW-TV). Hambrick won a local Emmy Award in 1979, and helped the station's newscast become the top rated news program in Cleveland. He left WJKW in 1981, moving the following year to rival WKYC-TV, where he served in a similar capacity until 1985.

Hambrick spent the next several years away from anchoring television news, though he worked on several business news ventures with NBC through his own production company.

Hambrick ended his self-imposed hiatus from TV news in 1992, when he briefly joined KTUL-TV in Tulsa as an anchor. Hambrick soon returned to WKYC in Cleveland for one final anchoring stint from 1993 to 1999. During his broadcast career, he also worked in markets such as Memphis, Atlanta, and Honolulu.

=== Word games ===
In addition to his television exploits, Hambrick has had a successful side career as a word game creator. Working with the creators of the crossword game Scrabble, Hambrick created a series of puzzles called Scrabblegrams (also called Scrabble Brand Grams) and published several volumes of books containing the puzzles, which consist of five different sets of letters. For each set of letters the goal is to make the highest scoring word possible, and each rack may have some sort of score bonus attached. All Scrabble scoring rules apply, including the 50-point bonus for using all seven letters. Scrabblegrams has also been syndicated to newspapers as a feature by Tribune Media Company in the past, and is currently under the distribution of Andrews McMeel Syndication for international markets only.

In North America, Hambrick created a second word game for newspapers called Word Scrimmage. The game is similar in nature to the Scrabblegrams, but with a football motif and different bonuses attached such as 60 points for using all of the letters.

=== Personal life ===
Judd Hambrick is the brother of newscasters John Hambrick (deceased) and Mike Hambrick. John co-anchored alongside Judd at KABC-TV during 1975–76, also worked in Cleveland (at WEWS from 1967 to 1975), and had stints at stations in New York City and Miami. Younger sibling Mike worked in several markets such as Phoenix, Pittsburgh, Baltimore, and Washington, D.C. A nephew, Jack Hambrick (John's son), also went into the television business as a news reporter and now, along with his father, has become a documentary filmmaker.

Hambrick, who is now semi-retired, lives with his wife in Florence, Alabama after pursuing some business ventures for a time in both the Belden and nearby Saltillo, Mississippi areas. Hambrick continues to work in mostly free-lance video news media production.
