= Tracks Ahead =

Television series

Tracks Ahead is a television series about railroading, produced by Milwaukee PBS, originally solely for their station WMVS, then syndicated to public television stations, starting in 1990.

In general, the series examines all aspects of railroading, both in the United States and in the rest of the world. Content covers a wide range of railroad-related materials. This includes scenic rail journeys, short-line railroads, layouts (in various gauges of model, tinplate, scale, garden), artists, photographers, and other railroad related material.

== Background ==
At the dawn of cable television, Chuck Zehner, a Milwaukee train enthusiast, began producing and hosting the interview format show Just Trains on Milwaukee's local access channel on Viacom Cable. Eventually the show was picked up on the cable network around Milwaukee, After 72 shows Milwaukee's WMVS Channel 10 (PBS) agreed to air a new magazine format show On Track in the Milwaukee market. For the second season it was renamed Tracks Ahead and expanded to the PBS network.

== History ==
The first season (released 1990) was hosted by Charles E. "Chuck" Zehner and the second season (released 1992) by Ward Kimball. Both were later repackaged and re-released with Spencer Christian as the host. All subsequent series have featured Christian.

The primary audience for the series is women (ages 25–63) and children (ages 3–18) by 63.4%. The remaining audience is railroad interest groups.

Season 5 was the first in 1080i high definition; season 6 was the first to incorporate 5.1 enhanced (surround sound) audio.

Tracks Ahead 7 started airing in January 2009. As with the previous two seasons, it is in high definition, with digital 5.1 surround sound. The 14-part season includes segments from Japan, the Caribbean, Patagonia, and all around the United States.

Tracks Ahead 8 starting airing in 2011 and marked the final season produced by series originator David K. Baule.

Tracks Ahead 9 began production in 2012, with the final series reaching air in 2015. TA9 was produced by Milwaukee PBS Producer Kevin F. Pulz and featured the introduction of drone production and continued many other innovative technologies that have garnered Tracks Ahead multiple awards for production throughout the years.

All programs are free offerings to public television stations and carried on around 200 TV markets in the US. As of 2008, the series can also be found in Japan, Romania, Germany and other European countries. Season 5 was licensed to HDNet in 2001, but that arrangement expired.

== Episodes ==
=== Season 1 (1990) ===
- Cleveland RTA (February 25, 1990)
- Indianapolis Children's Museum (March 4, 1990)
- Northern Railcar Wheelshop (March 11, 1990)
- Amtrak Chicago (March 18, 1990)
- California State Railroad Museum (March 25, 1990)
- Roaring Camp & Big Trees Railroad (April 1, 1990)
- Moffat Tunnel (April 8, 1990)
- Ward Kimball (April 15, 1990)
- Wm. K. Walthers (April 22, 1990)
- Santa Fe Piggyback (April 29, 1990)
- Lionel Trains (May 6, 1990)
- Railroad Museum of Pennsylvania (May 13, 1990)
- Minnesota Commercial Railroad (May 20, 1990)

=== Season 2 (1992) ===
- LS&I Railroad (February 23, 1992)
- Krupp Mak Locomotive Works (March 1, 1992)
- East Broad Top Railroad (March 8, 1992)
- The Tehachapi Loop (March 15, 1992)
- Germany's ICE Trains (March 22, 1992)
- Mt. Washington Cog Railway (March 29, 1992)
- San Diego Light Rail (April 5, 1992)
- Cass Scenic Railroad (April 12, 1992)
- BART (April 19, 1992)
- Union Pacific Harriman Dispatch (April 26, 1992)
- Jungfrau Railroad (May 3, 1992)
- Amtrak Beech Grove (May 10, 1992)
- Grand Canyon Railway (May 17, 1992)

=== Season 3 (1995) ===
- Intermodal Shipping (March 9, 1995)
- The Wisconsin Central (March 16, 1995)
- Clarke Dunham (March 23, 1995)
- Chile (March 30, 1995)
- Amtrak Chef (April 6, 1995)
- Alaska Railroad (April 13, 1995)
- Transportation Test Center (April 20, 1995)
- Paraguay (April 27, 1995)
- Renssalaer Railroad Club (May 4, 1995)
- Apalachicola Railroad (May 11, 1995)
- Iowa Electric Railroads (May 18, 1995)
- New Orleans Streetcars (May 25, 1995)
- Morrison & Knudsen (June 1, 1995)

=== Season 4 (1998) ===
- Rail Safari (March 12, 1998)
- White Pass (March 19, 1998)
- Trolley Museum (March 26, 1998)
- Tank Cars (April 2, 1998)
- Narrow Gauge (April 9, 1998)
- Middle Rhine (April 16, 1998)
- Vintage Diesel (April 23, 1998)
- Custom Building (April 30, 1998)
- Rail Motor Cars (May 7, 1998)
- Bailey Yard (May 14, 1998)
- Track Maintenance (May 21, 1998)
- Logging (May 28, 1998)
- Floating Railroad (June 4, 1998)

=== Season 5 (2002) ===
- Circus Train (February 24, 2002)
- Copper Canyon (March 3, 2002)
- The Indian Pacific RR (March 10, 2002)
- Road Railers (March 17, 2002)
- Northlandz (March 24, 2002)
- The Ghan (March 31, 2002)
- The King of Toy Trains (April 7, 2002)
- Trains of Cuba (April 14, 2002)
- Cable Cars (April 21, 2002)
- New Zealand by Rail (April 28, 2002)
- Union Station (May 5, 2002)
- Pacific Fruit Express (May 12, 2002)
- Puffing Billy (May 19, 2002)

=== Season 6 (2006) ===
- Alco PA1 (January 8, 2006)
- Wisconsin & Southern Railroad (January 15, 2006)
- Digital Command Control (January 22, 2006)
- Ireland Steam Tour (January 29, 2006)
- Amusement Park Trains (February 5, 2006)
- The White Creek Railroad (February 12, 2006)
- Grand Canyon Hotels (February 19, 2006)
- Holiday in Cincinnati (February 26, 2006)
- Carpathian Logging Railroad (March 5, 2006)
- Miniature Wonderland (March 12, 2006)
- The Great Train Story (March 19, 2006)
- Rügen Island Railway (March 26, 2006)
- Empire Builder (April 2, 2006)
- G Gauge in Mesa (April 9, 2006)

=== Season 7 (2008–2009) ===
- Ohio Central Railroad (November 1, 2008)
- Maine Narrow Gauge (November 8, 2008)
- Japan's Meitetsu Railroad (November 22, 2008)
- Young Guns of Steam (November 29, 2008)
- Palo Verde & Western Railroad (December 20, 2008)
- Japan's Bullet Trains (December 27, 2008)
- The Dakota Southern Railroad (January 3, 2009)
- Railroads in Patagonia (January 10, 2009)
- Panama Canal Railway (January 17, 2009)
- Los Angeles Rail Transit (January 24, 2009)
- Railtown 1897 (January 31, 2009)
- EnterTRAINment Junction (February 7, 2009)
- Strasburg Railroading (February 14, 2009)
- St Kitts Scenic Railway (February 21, 2009)

=== Season 8 (2011–2012) ===
- Harz Mountain Railway (December 26, 2011)
- Greeley Freight Station Museum (January 2, 2012)
- ChiTown Union Station (January 9, 2012)
- Saxony Narrow Gauge Railways (January 16, 2012)
- The Flying Yankee (January 23, 2012)
- Wheeling & Lake Erie Railroad (January 30, 2012)
- The Mollibahn (February 6, 2012)
- FairPlex (February 13, 2012)
- Arkansas & Missouri Railroad (February 20, 2012)
- Adobe Mountain Railroad Park (February 27, 2012)
- Western Pacific Railroad Museum (March 5, 2012)
- California Zephyr (March 12, 2012)
- Trans Siberian Railroad (part 1) (March 19, 2012)
- Trans Siberian Railroad (part 2) (March 26, 2012)

=== Season 9 (2015) ===
- Skunk Train (January 31, 2015)
- Wanamaker, Kempton and Southern (February 7, 2015)
- Oregon Coast Scenic Railroad (February 14, 2015)
- QJ Steam (February 21, 2015)
- Saxon Taura Holiday Park (March 21, 2015)
- Entertainment Junction (March 28, 2015)
- Taltree Arboretum (April 23, 2015)
- Miller F Gauge (April 30, 2015)
- Layout Under-Glass (May 7, 2015)
- LGB Friends (May 14, 2015)
- Tweetsie Railroad (May 21, 2015)
- Iowa Interstate Railroad (May 28, 2015)
- Images of the Past (June 4, 2015)
