= Mike Hambrick =

American journalist and TV/Radio news anchor/presenter

Mike Hambrick (born in Tyler, Texas) is an American television anchor, reporter, and correspondent who has worked on network television stations such as WJLA-TV in Washington, D.C., WRC-TV in Washington, D.C., KTVT-TV in Dallas, KTAR-TV (now KPNX) in Phoenix, WPXI-TV in Pittsburgh, Pennsylvania, and WBAL-TV in Baltimore in 1975. Hambrick was also a news anchor for WPXI-TV in Pittsburgh, where he also served as managing editor.

== Early life ==
Hambrick was born in Tyler, Texas and grew up in Northeast Texas, where he began his broadcasting career. At age 15, he worked for his local radio station broadcasting disk jockey.

Hambrick's TV news career to him to television stations in
Baltimore, Maryland,
Pittsburgh, Pennsylvania,
Phoenix, Arizona,
Memphis, Tennessee,
Cleveland, Ohio,
Dallas-Fort Worth, Texas,
Washington, D.C.,
and then New York City.
He retired from TV News after many years in Washington, D.C.

== Family ==
He is brother to veteran newscasters Judd Hambrick, and John Hambrick, and the uncle of newscaster Jack Hambrick (John's son). Hambrick is divorced. He has three children and six grandchildren.

== Awards and honors ==
Hambrick has won a number of awards for his work, which include:

- Several Emmy awards
- Edward R. Murrow Award for Excellence in Broadcasting for his documentary about the D-Day invasion during the World War II

== America's Business News anchor ==
America’s Business with Mike Hambrick was a one-hour weekly news and information program. Hambrick's second nationally syndicated radio program was Freedomline with Mike Hambrick and was acclaimed by Radio America Network as "an exceptional newsmagazine program and an important voice the defense of the rights of individuals."

== Sources ==
- America's Business News summary and Mike Hambrick Biography
- America's Business News Official Website
