= Lawrence North High School =

Location
- 7802 Hague Road; Indianapolis, Indiana 46256; United States; 39°53′46″N 86°02′05″W

Information
- Type: Public high school
- Motto: Once a wildcat always a wildcat
- Opened: 1974
- School district: Metropolitan School District of Lawrence Township
- Superintendent: Dr. Shawn A. Smith
- Principal: Jason Floyd
- Faculty: 146 (2019–20)
- Grades: 9 to 12
- Gender: Coed
- Enrollment: 2,832 (2023-2024)
- Campus type: Suburban
- Colors: Red and green
- Mascot: Wildcats
- Newspaper: North Star
- Yearbook: LYNX
- Feeder schools: Fall Creek Valley Middle School
- Website: lawrencenorth.ltschools.org

Lawrence North High School is a public high school in Indianapolis, Indiana, United States. The school was founded in 1974 (cornerstone laid)and graduated its first class in 1978. Lawrence North is one of two high schools in the Metropolitan School District of Lawrence Township, the other one being Lawrence Central High School.

== Academics ==
=== Enrollment ===
As of the 2019–20 school year, Lawrence North had an enrollment of 2,619 students. The student population is mostly African-American, followed equally by White and Latino. Thirteen percent of the students are involved in special education, ten percent qualify for English language learner support, and fifty-four percent qualify for free or reduced price lunch. The teachers, however, are seventy-seven percent white, and most of them have more than twenty years of teaching experience.

=== Awards and recognition ===
Lawrence North is recognized by the Indiana Department of Education as a Four-Star School, the highest honor that body can confer. It is also fully accredited by the North Central Association of Colleges and Schools.

=== Programs ===
Lawrence North offers 23 Advanced Placement courses, 38 dual credit courses, and houses an International Baccalaureate program, which was started in July 2003. It is also distinctive for being the only school in the district that is designated as a K-12 Spanish Language Immersion Program, a program recently recognized as an International Spanish Academy by Spanish Ministry of Education. Vocational courses are offered in neighboring McKenzie Center for Innovation and Technology. In addition, other World Languages program like French, German, and American Sign Language are also offered.

== Extracurricular activities ==
=== Athletics ===
Currently, it offer ten sports programs for both boys and girls, as well as several club and intramural teams. The Wildcats is a member of the Metropolitan Interscholastic Conference, a member conference of Indiana High School Athletic Association. They have won 17 state-level championships to date.

Lawrence North is a household name in Indiana high school boys basketball. They have won one national, four state, six regional, 17 sectional, and 16 conference titles under guidance of Jack Keefer, one of Indiana's most legendary basketball coach who had managed the program from its establishment in 1976, until his retirement in 2022. Shooting guard Brad Leaf led all Marion County, Indiana, scorers as a senior at Lawrence North in 1978 with a 25.5-point average, with a single-game high of 38 points.

The first state title came in 1989, when the team was led by Eric Montross. The next three titles came in a row from 2004 to 2006, guided by future NBA players Greg Oden and Mike Conley Jr. The program has also produced 13 Indiana All-Stars. Keefer is the first coach from Indiana to be named National High School Coach of the Year by USA Today, Sports Illustrated and the National High School Coaches Association in 2006, and inducted into the Indiana Basketball Hall of Fame in 2007. He is one of eight high school coaches in Indiana history to have 700 or more victories, and in 2016 the gymnasium was renamed in his honor.

IHSAA State Championships
Sport	Year(s)
Boys Basketball (4)	1989, 2004, 2005, 2006
Girls Basketball (2)	2020, 2025
Boys Track (5)	1990, 2001, 2002, 2003, 2025
Girls Track (2)	2009, 2011
Boys Wrestling (4)	1992, 1993, 2004, 2005

=== Marching band ===
Lawrence North's band program was merged with its Lawrence Central counterpart to form Marching Pride of Lawrence Township in 2014. It currently has more than 250 members, divided into various program such as marching band, color guard, winter guard, concert band, jazz band, and pep band. They are selected to participate in 2017 Rose Parade in Pasadena, California.

=== Student publication ===
The main publication of the school is North Star, a student-run newspaper that is published ten times a year. There is also yearbook program LYNX, video news program Cat's Eye, and literary magazine.

== Notable alumni ==
- Steve Bellamy – Sports and media entrepreneur, founder of The Tennis Channel and The Ski Channel
- Garrett Burhenn – MLB pitcher in the Detroit Tigers organization
- Eddie Casiano – Puerto Rican basketball player, former coach of Puerto Rico national basketball team
- Mike Conley Jr. – NBA player for Minnesota Timberwolves
- Omar Cooper – NFL wide receiver for the New York Jets, 2025 CFB National Champion with the Indiana Hoosiers
- Daeshon Francis (born 1996) – basketball player in the Israeli Basketball Premier League
- Nick Hardwick – Former NFL center for the San Diego Chargers
- Eron Harris - Former professional basketball player
- Chris Hill (basketball), Former professional basketball player for the Ligue Nationale de Basketball, Turkish Basketball League, & Basketball League Belgium
- Kenny Irwin Jr. – Former NASCAR driver, killed in crash in 2000
- Felisha Johnson – Ranked 14th at the 2016 Summer Olympics in women's shot put
- Caleb Jones – American football player for the Green Bay Packers
- Scott Leonard – Frontman of the music group Rockapella
- Brad Leaf – American-Israeli basketball player for Hapoel Galil Elyon and Maccabi Tel Aviv of the Israel Premier League
- Donaven McCulley - American football wide receiver
- Christine Montross – Psychiatrist and writer
- Eric Montross – Former NBA player for the Boston Celtics, Dallas Mavericks, New Jersey Nets, Philadelphia 76ers, Detroit Pistons and Toronto Raptors
- Greg Oden – Former NBA player for the Miami Heat and Portland Trail Blazers
- Will Patterson - Former professional football player
- Nick Roberts - Politician, elected to the Indianapolis City-County Council
- Ashley Spencer – Bronze medalist at the 2016 Summer Olympics in women's 400 metres hurdles
- Tiara Thomas – Singer-songwriter and record producer
- Kyle Walker - Politician, elected to the Indiana State Senate
- Nolan Watson – minor league baseball player
- Damon Watts - Former professional football player

== See also ==
- List of schools in Indianapolis
- List of high schools in Indiana

== See also ==
- List of high schools in Indiana
