= VODnet =

Video on demand television network

A VODnet is a Video On Demand-driven cable and satellite television network. It is a non-linear television network in that the content resides on a server and the consumer selects what they want to watch from a digital menu. This is in contrast to a linear network that shows scheduled programs throughout the day. Usually VODnets are genre portal based. For example, Sportskool and The Ski Channel would be found under "Sports" and MGM Channel would be under "Movies."

Currently, all major cable, satellite and telco distributors and most mid-size cable operators carry VODnets.

The majority of VODnets launched in 2007 and 2008.

== VODnets include ==
- FEARnet
- MGM Channel
- ExerciseTV
- The Ski Channel
- Lifeskool, formerly Mag Rack
- Wheels TV
- Karaoke Channel
- Havoc TV
- Music Choice
- Studio 4 Fitness
- Concert TV
- EuroCinema
- Film Festival
- Anime Network
- Players Network

== Criteria ==
Traditional Cable Networks that have VOD Video On Demand are not considered a VODnet because VOD is not the main distribution method for the channel. For example, Speed Channel which has VOD programming available through most cable and satellite providers, would not be considered a VODnet because their main distribution method is linear.

== Important facts ==
In October 2008, Mag Rack Entertainment acquired Lifeskool from Cablevision's Rainbow Media. Mag Rack then purchased Concert.tv. The founders of Concert TV did not stay after the deal.

In early 2009 Ripe Digital Entertainment went bankrupt. They had supposedly raised over $50 million but spent lavishly and were the victim of poor timing. ExerciseTV ceased distribution in November 2011 and was replaced on Time Warner Cable by Sportskool Fit, a new channel created by Sportskool.
