= Tennis News =

Tennis News is a news source for the sport of tennis.

== History ==
Bob Larson's Tennis News, based in Minneapolis, Minnesota, has been owned and operated since 1974 by Bob Larson and reports daily and hourly on the state of the game, the pro players and the industry. Tennis News features no editorial only hard news. Larson spends all day on the phone with tennis industry insiders and packaged up tennis. He also goes to the US Open and BNP Paribas Open in Indian Wells where he has a second home. At the US Open, Larson has a bench that he sits at all day long bumping into people and getting scoops.

Bob Larson's Tennis News operates www.tennisnews.com, and publishes Daily Tennis News Business, Daily Tennis News World News, Daily Tennis News Pro Tour Men, Daily Tennis News Pro Tour Women, Weekly Tennis News, Daily Tennis Jobs.

== Other properties ==
Daily Tennis is the daily emailed tipsheet that goes out to the tennis industry insiders. Juniortennisnews.com is the main source of tennis news for junior tennis players in the US. College News is an emailed daily newsletter to college coaches and players and tennis celebs is a weekly emailed newsletter highlighting celebrity oriented tennis news.

== Tennis News Person of the Year Award ==
Tennis News awards the tennis industry's annual "Person of the Year" Award. The award was started in 2005 and is named The Bellamy after its first recipient Steve Bellamy the founder of The Tennis Channel. The award is announced the first week of the year in Bob Larson's Daily Tennis News and is presented in March during the BNP Paribas Open in Indian Wells, California.

Winners include:

- 2005 - Steve Bellamy - founder of The Tennis Channel
- 2006 - Peter Burwash - founder of Peter Burwash International
- 2007 - Arlen Kantarian - former CEO of the USTA
- 2008 - Nick Bollettieri - founder of Nick Bollettieri Tennis Academy
- 2009 - Jon Muir - Wilson Racquet Sports and Tennis Industry Association
- 2010 - Stacy Allaster - CEO of WTA
- 2011 - BNP Paribas - tennis sponsor
- 2012 - Bob Bryan and Mike Bryan - Tennis Players
- 2013 - Larry Ellison - Owner of BNP Paribas Open
