= Alex Bogomolov Jr. =

Russian-American tennis player

Alex Bogomolov Jr. Алекс Богомолов
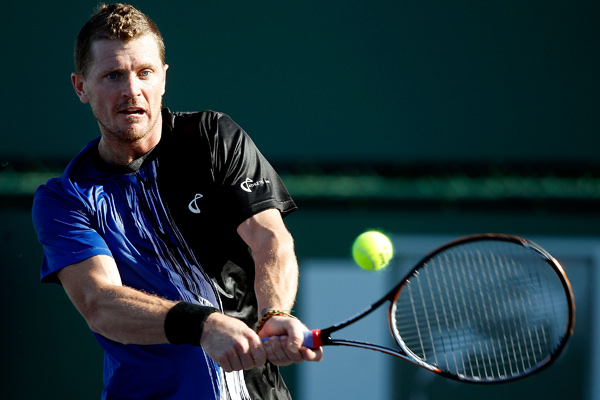
- Bogomolov in 2011
- Full name: Aleksandr Aleksandrovich Bogomolov Jr.
- Country (sports): United States (2002–2011); Russia (2012–2014)
- Born: April 23, 1983 (age 42) Moscow, Russian SFSR, Soviet Union
- Height: 1.78 m (5 ft 10 in)
- Turned pro: 2002
- Retired: 2014
- Plays: Right-handed (two-handed backhand)
- Prize money: $1,946,779

Singles
- Career record: 70–107 (at ATP Tour and Grand Slam-level, and in Davis Cup)
- Career titles: 0
- Highest ranking: No. 33 (31 October 2011)

Grand Slam singles results
- Australian Open: 2R (2006, 2012)
- French Open: 1R (2004, 2011, 2012)
- Wimbledon: 3R (2011)
- US Open: 3R (2011)

Other tournaments
- Olympic Games: 2R (2012)

Doubles
- Career record: 27–37 (at ATP Tour and Grand Slam-level, and in Davis Cup)
- Career titles: 1
- Highest ranking: No. 100 (3 October 2011)

Grand Slam doubles results
- US Open: 3R (2012)
- Last updated on: December 12, 2013.

Alex Bogomolov Jr.
Medal record

Representing United States

Pan American Games
Bronze medal – third place	2003 Santo Domingo	Doubles

Aleksandr Aleksandrovich Bogomolov Jr. (Russian: Александр Александрович «Алекс» Богомолов; born April 23, 1983), nicknamed Bogie, is a Russian-American former professional tennis player.

== Tennis career ==
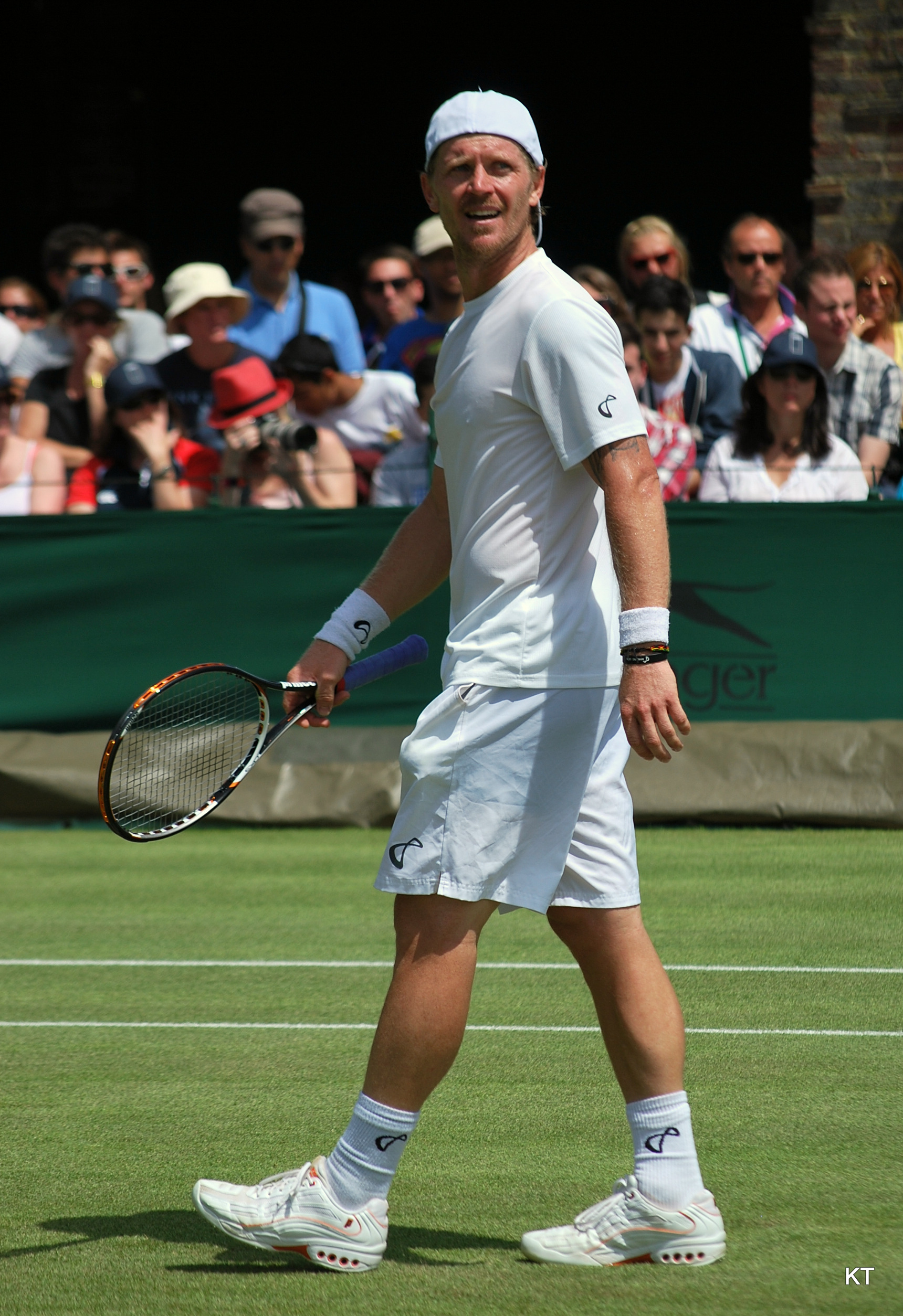
Bogomolov at the 2012 Wimbledon Championships

Born in Moscow, Russia, the 5' 10" Bogomolov's father, Alex Sr., was a Soviet tennis coach who worked with Larisa Neiland, Yevgeny Kafelnikov, and Andrei Medvedev.

In 1998 he won the USTA National Boys' 16 Championships, defeating Andy Roddick in the final.

After losing in the first round of his first Grand Slam appearance at Wimbledon, Bogomolov was beaten by David Nalbandian in the first round of the 2001 US Open.

In 2005, he was suspended for eight weeks after a positive doping test from the Australian Open. The banned substance found was salbutamol. Bogomolov admitted taking the substance through an inhaler to treat exercise-induced asthma and that he had not applied for a medical exemption. The tribunal decided he had not intentionally taken the drug in an effort to boost his performance and so the usual two-year ban did not apply, however he lost the prize money and ranking points earned at several competitions during the relevant time period.

In July 2008, he won the Shotgun 21 world championship at the Pacific Palisades Tennis Center, defeating John Isner in the semifinal, and Phillip King in the final, twice by the score of 21–20. In September Bogomolov beat world no. 83 Bobby Reynolds, 6–2, 4–6, 6–3, in Waco, Texas. After having surgery on his left wrist in late 2008, Bogomolov began work at the Gotham Tennis Academy.

In July 2009 at the Hall of Fame Championships, he defeated Arnaud Clément of France, 1–6, 6–3, 6–4.

In 2011 Bogomolov won his first Challenger title in three years in Champaign-Urbana over Amer Delić, 5–7, 7–6, 6–3. That same year Bogomolov defeated Andy Murray 6–1, 7–5, in the second round of the Miami Masters 1000 but lost to John Isner in the third round. At the 2011 Farmers Classic, Bogomolov was defeated by Ernests Gulbis in the semifinals, 2–6, 6–7. In the first round of the Western & Southern Open he defeated Robby Ginepri 6–4, 6–3 . After defeating an out-of-sorts world no. 10 Jo-Wilfried Tsonga 6–3, 6–4 in the second round, he faced a rematch with Andy Murray in the third, this time losing 2–6, 5–7.

At the US Open, he lost in the third round to John Isner, 6–7, 4–6, 4–6. At the end of the 2011 season he was named the ATP's most improved player after rising from no.166 in the ATP rankings at the beginning of 2011 to no. 33 at season's end. On December 1, the International Tennis Federation ruled him eligible to compete for Russia in the Davis Cup.

In the 2012 Australian Open Bogomolov was seeded 32: his first ever Grand Slam seeding. He achieved a joint personal best by progressing to the 2nd round where he lost in 5 sets in Michaël Llodra.

Bogomolov retired at the end of 2014. His final match was a straight sets loss to Tatsuma Ito in the second round of qualifying at the 2014 US Open.

== Personal ==
Bogomolov was married to American tennis player Ashley Harkleroad. The two split up in the fall of 2006 after less than two years, and divorced. "I think we were too young to be married," Harkleroad said. "And I think he's better off without me." He is now engaged to his girlfriend Luana, with whom he has a son, Maddox.

== ATP career finals ==
=== Doubles: 1 (1–1) ===
Legend Grand Slam Tournaments (0–0) ATP World Tour Finals (0–0) ATP World Tour Masters 1000 (0–0) ATP World Tour 500 Series (0–0) ATP World Tour 250 Series (1–1)	Finals by surface Hard (1–1) Clay (0–0) Grass (0–0) Carpet (0–0)

Outcome	W–L	Date	Tournament	Surface	Partner	Opponents	Score
Runner-up	0–1	Sep 2004	China Open, China	Hard	(United States) Taylor Dent	(United States) Justin Gimelstob (United States) Graydon Oliver	6–4, 4–6, 6–7^{(6–8)}
Winner	1–1	Jul 2011	Atlanta Tennis Championships, United States	Hard	(Australia) Matthew Ebden	(Germany) Matthias Bachinger (Germany) Frank Moser	3–6, 7–5, [10–8]

== Performance timelines ==
Key
W	F	SF	QF	#R	RR	Q#	DNQ	A	NH

(W) winner; (F) finalist; (SF) semifinalist; (QF) quarterfinalist; (#R) rounds 4, 3, 2, 1; (RR) round-robin stage; (Q#) qualification round; (DNQ) did not qualify; (A) absent; (NH) not held; (SR) strike rate (events won / competed); (W–L) win–loss record.

=== Singles ===
	United States											Russia			
Tournament	2001	2002	2003	2004	2005	2006	2007	2008	2009	2010	2011	2012	2013	2014	W–L
Grand Slam tournaments
Australian Open	A	A	1R	1R	A	2R	Q2	A	A	Q3	Q3	2R	1R	1R	2–6
French Open	A	A	A	1R	A	A	A	Q1	A	Q3	1R	1R	Q2	Q1	0–3
Wimbledon	A	A	A	A	A	A	A	Q2	Q1	Q1	3R	1R	1R	A	2–3
US Open	1R	1R	1R	1R	1R	A	Q2	A	Q1	Q2	3R	1R	2R	Q2	3–8
Win–loss	0–1	0–1	0–2	0–3	0–1	1–1	0–0	0–0	0–0	0–0	4–3	1–4	1–3	0–1	7–20
Olympic Games
Summer Olympics	Not Held			A	Not Held			A	Not Held			2R	NH		1–1
ATP Masters Series
Indian Wells Masters	A	A	A	2R	A	A	A	A	A	Q1	1R	1R	Q1	1R	1–4
Miami Masters	A	A	1R	1R	A	2R	A	A	A	A	3R	1R	A	1R	3–6
Monte Carlo Masters	A	A	A	A	A	A	A	A	A	A	A	A	A	A	0–0
Rome Masters	A	A	A	A	A	A	A	A	A	A	A	1R	A	Q1	0–1
Madrid Masters	A	A	A	A	A	A	A	A	A	Q1	A	1R	A	A	0–1
Canada Masters	A	A	A	2R	A	A	A	A	1R	A	2R	1R	3R	A	4–5
Cincinnati Masters	A	A	A	1R	A	A	A	A	A	A	3R	2R	Q1	A	3–3
Shanghai Masters	Not Masters Series								A	A	2R	1R	A	A	1–2
Paris Masters	A	A	A	A	A	A	A	A	A	A	2R	A	A	A	1–1
Win–loss	0–0	0–0	0–1	2–4	0–0	1–1	0–0	0–0	0–1	0–0	7–6	1–7	2–1	0–2	13–23
Career statistics
Titles–Finals	0–0	0–0	0–0	0–0	0–0	0–0	0–0	0–0	0–0	0–0	0–0	0–0	0–0	0–0	0–0
Year-end ranking	700	168	115	125	217	221	189	165	309	166	33	129	88	308	

=== Doubles ===
Tournament	2005	2011	2012	2013	W–L
Grand Slam tournaments
Australian Open	A	A	2R	A	1–1
French Open	A	A	1R	A	0–1
Wimbledon	A	2R	1R	A	1–2
US Open	1R	1R	3R	A	2–3
Win–loss	0–1	1–2	3–4	0-0	4–7

== See also ==
- List of sportspeople sanctioned for doping offences

Awards
Preceded by (Kazakhstan) Andrey Golubev	ATP Most Improved Player; 2011	Succeeded by (Australia) Marinko Matosevic
