= Full Measure with Sharyl Attkisson =

Sunday morning American public affairs show

- Genre: Public affairs/investigative news magazine
- Created by: Scott Livingston
- Presented by: Sharyl Attkisson
- Theme music composer: 615 Music
- Opening theme: "Sinclair News Package" by 615 Music
- Country of origin: United States
- Original language: English
- No. of seasons: 4
- No. of episodes: 119

Production
- Executive producer: Batt Humphreys
- Producer: Kim Skeen
- Production locations: Sinclair Broadcast Group Washington Bureau, Washington, D.C.
- Camera setup: Multi-camera
- Running time: 22 minutes
- Production company: Sinclair Television Group

Original release
- Network: Syndication
- Release: October 4, 2015 – present

Related
- News Central

Full Measure is an American Sunday morning political affairs and investigative news magazine series hosted by investigative journalist Sharyl Attkisson. The program is produced, broadcast, and syndicated by the Sinclair Television Group. It is shown on most television stations operated by the Sinclair Broadcast Group division, initially broadcast at 9:30 a.m. Eastern Time on Sundays in some stations and later in the day by others. It is also streamed live-to-air on the program's website, FullMeasure.news. Topics often include coverage of government spending or actions considered inappropriate.

== Format ==
Full Measure is named after a line in the Gettysburg Address honoring soldiers who died fighting for the United States. The show differs from other Sunday public affairs programs because it does not utilize the common week-in-review political discussion or panel discussion formats, which Attkisson intended to avoid due to the prevalence of existing programs formatted this way. The magazine-format program instead features a mix of multiple long-form reports conducted by Attkisson and a team of correspondents – with a focus on investigative "accountability journalism" centering on political and socioeconomic issues (including wasteful project spending by state and federal governments, political whistleblowing, and fraud and abuse of power by corporations and special interest groups).

The reports featured on the program deal mainly with topical matter that Attkisson considers to be "untouchable topic[s]" by other news organizations, intended to be reported in a manner that would not be "steer[ed] in a [ideological] direction just to prove a point". Although it departs from the standard Sunday morning talk show format, Full Measure also features interviews with political figures in the news. The premiere broadcast on October 4, 2015 featured an interview conducted by Attkisson with Republican presidential candidate Donald Trump. Sinclair executive David Smith met with Trump during the 2016 election year, in which he told the future president, "We are here to deliver your message." It was part of a pitch to have reporters embedded in the Trump campaign.

== Production and development ==
On April 22, 2015, Sinclair Broadcast Group announced that it reached an agreement with Attkisson to host a half-hour weekly Washington, D.C.–based news program that would debut on most of Sinclair's ABC, NBC, CBS, Fox, and CW-affiliated stations in 79 markets, including those operated by partner companies such as Deerfield Media and Cunningham Broadcasting that fall. The creation of the Full Measure program came as Sinclair began to venture further into original programming development (having already produced a weekly program for Ring of Honor after its 2011 purchase of the wrestling promotion, as well as owning the American Sports Network syndication service, and the distribution of The Right Side with conservative commentator Armstrong Williams, who has an interest in Howard Stirk Holdings, another company close to Sinclair), a move solidified through an investment/development deal with The Tornante Company (owned by former Walt Disney Company CEO Michael Eisner) which was announced that July.

Attkisson had been working as a freelance correspondent for Sinclair's Washington bureau since 2014 after she resigned as Washington, D.C. bureau correspondent for CBS News the year before, following claims detailed in her 2014 book, Stonewalled, that computers in Attkisson's CBS office were hacked and infected with spyware, and that the correspondent experienced editorial interference from CBS News management while trying to report in a manner she perceived as fair. The contentious topics related to the Obama administration, such as the investigation of the 2012 Benghazi attack and the rollout of the Patient Protection and Affordable Care Act. Attkisson had filed reports syndicated to the Sinclair group's news-producing stations for their local evening newscasts, and then she officially joined the Sinclair bureau full-time in June 2015.

In announcing the program, its title, and premiere date, Sinclair Television Group vice president of news Scott Livingston stated that the program's goal is "to provide the context and perspective on major issues impacting our viewers", and he noted that Attkisson's "unwavering commitment to exposing government waste, abuse and impropriety will be the foundation of our news program". Several former CBS News production staff members were hired for the program, including its executive producer, Batt Humphreys (who formerly served as executive producer of The Early Show and as the division's director of Standards and Practices).

Sinclair gave Attkisson editorial control of Full Measure, allowing it to deal with topics that may be perceived as controversial or having a political or ideological agenda. Sinclair has been criticized by some media advocacy groups in the past for its syndicated weekly conservative commentary segments hosted by company vice president Mark Hyman since 2003 and has produced programs critical of Democratic candidates in past presidential elections.
