= Action Sport Networks =

Action Sport
- Industry: Television
- Founder: Steve Bellamy
- Headquarters: United States
- Key people: Steve Bellamy (chair)
- Products: movies
- Brands: The Ski Channel; The Surf Channel; Skate Channel

Action Sport Networks is a network of three specialty sports video-on-demand channels.

== Background ==
About 1997, Steve Bellamy had the idea of cable channel for skiing and started work on the concept. He switch to working on a tennis channel concept given the broader audience for tennis. In 2005, Bellamy and the rest of the Tennis Channel's management was swept out by the owners.

== History ==
In 2006, Bellamy became Chief Executive Officer of Action Sport Networks. In April 2007, Bellamy announced the formation of The Ski Channel television Video on demand channel that would focus on mountain oriented sports, activity and lifestyle initial under the banner of his Atonal Sports and Entertainment company. In August 2012, Bellamy announced that he's launching a second Action Sports Networks outlet, the Surf Channel in mid-September. By 2015, Bellamy was made chairman of Action Sport Networks.

== The Surf Channel ==
The Surf Channel
- February 2011

History
- Launched: September 2012

Links
- Website: thesurfchannel.com

Availability

Streaming media
- Youtube: Surfchannel

The Surf Channel is a sports, travel and lifestyle video on demand channel. Programs are also available on YouTube. The channel is expected to be available in 20 million homes via the video on demand services of cable and satellite companies like DirecTV, Dish Network, Comcast, Cox Communications, Filmon.com and YouTube. The channel is expected to generate its revenue primarily from advertising instead of user fees.

In February 2011, the channel began filming its original programs. During the August 2012 US Open of Surfing in Huntington Beach, Steve Bellamy announced that he's launching a third outlet, the Surf Channel, that will devote itself to beach, water and board sports, lifestyle and travel, in mid-September. At the open, the channel made the Association of Surfing Professionals board aware that it was interest in re-airing contest and highlights. From the open, the channel had already posted in August some content on YouTube on which the channel had a preferred partnership agreement for surf content. The initial program was The Endless Summer.

Most of the programs consist of movies and originals. On YouTube, the channel has as separate programming slate. Manulele Incorporated is a producer of programming for the channel under its executive producer Mike Latronic. Original films included “Winter”, "The Story” and a Shane McConkey documentary.
