= David Kozlowski =

American tennis player

David "Koz" Kozlowski is an American tennis teaching professional and tennis commentator.

Kozlowski is one of the first 17 Master Professionals in the world, as certified by the USPTA. He was named the USTA Broadcaster of the Year in 2000 and Pro of the Year three times – 1978 in Alabama, 1997 in Florida, and National Pro of the year in 2001.

Koz produces and hosts the "Inside Tennis with the Koz" program, which was broadcast for five years on The Tennis Channel, before continuing on IndieTennis.com.
