= Chris Ripley =

Canadian media executive

- Education: University of Western Ontario (BA)
- Known for: CEO of Sinclair Broadcast Group

Christopher S. Ripley is a Canadian media executive. He is the president and CEO of Sinclair Broadcast Group.

== Background ==
Chris Ripley has been the president and CEO of Sinclair Broadcast Group since January 2017 after working as their chief financial officer from April 2014 to January 2017. Ripley is also an investor director of Hibu.

Before joining Sinclair, Ripley was a managing director at UBS Investment Bank’s global media group and head of their Los Angeles office. At UBS, Ripley advised, managed, and structured various financings along with acquisition and merger transactions in the entertainment and broadcast sectors. Before that position, he was a principal in Prime Ventures and an analyst in the investment banking division at Donaldson, Lufkin & Jenrette.
