= Palisades Tennis Center =

Palisades Tennis Center is a tennis academy located in Pacific Palisades, California. It is known to be the birthplace of The Tennis Channel television network, Liveball and Shotgun 21. It is also known for attracting a large celebrity following. Hilary Swank, Kate Hudson, Elisabeth Shue and numerous others play there regularly. Stories in many publications have been done on center including Tennis, Inside Tennis and Tennis Life.

The Tennis Channel was founded on court one at the tennis center by Steve Bellamy, the founder of Palisades Tennis Center, after he was frustrated by how little tennis was on television set against how popular tennis was at his center.

LiveBall is a game specialized at the center that is now used all over the world.

Shotgun 21 is a tournament format exclusive to the Palisades Tennis Center, but is starting to roll out across the country. Numerous other pros and celebrities were in the draw including Taylor Dent, Donald Young, Robert Kendrick, Ashley Harkleroad, Alexandra Stevenson and Elisabeth Shue, Donna Mills, Josh Morrow and Chad Lowe. The event has been sponsored by Wilson and Fender Guitars both years.
