= The Ski Channel =

- Country: United States
- Broadcast area: National
- Headquarters: Pacific Palisades, California

Programming
- Picture format: 1080i

Ownership
- Owner: Action Sport Networks
- Sister channels: Surf Channel; Skate Channel

History
- Launched: December 25, 2008

Links
- Website: theskichannel.com

The Ski Channel is a video on demand cable, satellite and telco television channel distributed on Comcast, Time Warner Cable, DirecTV, Verizon FiOS, Brighthouse Networks, Cablevision, RCN, AT&T U-Verse and Cox Communications. The technical term for a channel of this type is VODnet. It features mountain oriented sports, activity and lifestyle content and is devoted to year-round mountain activities such as skiing, snowboarding, hiking, biking, backpacking, climbing and other mountain sports. The channel launched on December 25, 2008. Tennis doubles team Bob and Mike Bryan are investors in the channel. It was founded by Steve Bellamy who also founded Tennis Channel.

== Background ==
About 1997, Bellamy had the idea of cable channel for skiing and started work on the concept. He switch to working on a tennis channel concept given the broader audience for tennis. In 2005, Bellamy and the rest of the Tennis Channel's management was swept out by the owners.

== History ==
In April 2007, Bellamy announced the formation of The Ski Channel television Video on demand channel that would focus on mountain oriented sports, activity and lifestyle. That announcement brought a long term cable distribution deal with Time Warner and advertising deals with: Panasonic, Fender Guitars, Marquis Jets and Mirage Resorts. Panasonic's President, Andy Nelkin stated they were going to use the networks affluent audience to market their new 107 inch hi definition television that cost $70,000. Shortly after a flurry of programming announcements were made with ski film maker Rage Films, episodic television series Ride Guide and a series with legendary action sports photographer Tony Harrington, entitled, "Storm Hunter".

A big announcement was a partnership with Olympic Gold Medalist Jonny Moseley that made Moseley an investor in the channel, a spokesperson and gave Moseley a signature show on the network. The Moseley announcement came at “The Ski Channel Baby Shower” and was attended by ski and snowboard stars: Julia Mancuso, Kirstina Koznick, Lauren Ross and Dash Longe. Alexandra Paul, Donna Mills, Melissa Rivers, Dawnn Lewis, Jaron Lowenstein, Scott Grimes, Kevin Durand, Amy Pietz, Jason Gray Stanford, Sinjin Smith, Pam Shriver and George Lazenby attended as well.

On November 17, 2008, it was reported by Business Week that the channel had added DirecTV and Verizon to its list of distributors, that it was launching on Christmas Day of 2008 and that it had acquired the broadcast rights to classic Warren Miller movies. The channel was launched on December 25, 2008. Cox and Bright House were also on board as launch carriers.

On June 1, 2009, it was announced that The Ski Channel had entered into a long term partnership with AT&T Uverse that would put the channel available as a fee on-demand service. The channel also made its first theatrical licensing deal for the Universal Pictures film, First Descent, featuring Shawn White, facing down Alaska's "extreme slopes".

In July 2010, The Ski Channel announced a deal with Comcast that brings the network to 43 million US television households when added to the previous distribution. The channel also announced that a mid-October grass-roots film tour would feature the debut of channel produced ski films before they air on the service channel.

== Programs ==
The network broadcasts events, movies, destination travel, news, equipment, instructional, real estate and all the different sports and activities that take place in the mountains in both the summer and winter. The channel has announced event rights that include the World Heli Championships that takes place in New Zealand and is the billed as the most extreme sporting event in the world, World Freeski Championships, the Subaru US Freeskiing Tour, The North Face Snowboard Tour and the Teva Mountain Games. Olympic Gold Medalist, Jonny Moseley has his own show called “Air It Out With Jonny Moseley.”

== Cable and Satellite Distribution ==
Currently, The Ski Channel is available on 7 of the largest television distribution companies Time Warner Cable, DirecTV, Cox Communications, Verizon FiOS, Brighthouse Networks, AT&T U-Verse and Dish Network. Comcast reached a carriage agreement on July 19, 2010.
