= Will Patterson =

American football player (born 1987)

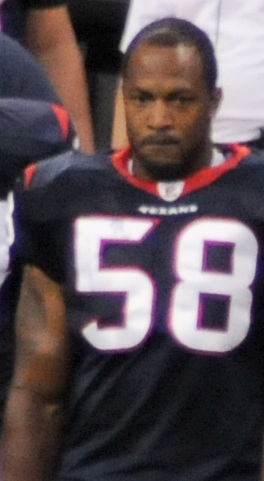
- Patterson in 2010 with the Houston Texans

No. 52
- Position: Linebacker

Personal information
- Born: July 20, 1987 (age 39)
- Listed height: 6 ft 1 in (1.85 m)
- Listed weight: 237 lb (108 kg)

Career information
- High school: Indianapolis (IN) Lawrence North
- College: Indiana
- NFL draft: 2010: undrafted

Career history
- Houston Texans (2010)*; Virginia Destroyers (2011)*; Iowa Barnstormers (2012)
- * Offseason or practice squad member only

Career AFL statistics
- Total tackles: 22.5
- Sacks: .5
- Forced fumbles: 0
- Stats at ArenaFan.com

William Louis Patterson (born July 20, 1987) is an American former football linebacker. Patterson played college football for the Indiana Hoosiers. Patterson signed with the Iowa Barnstormers of the Arena Football League (AFL) in 2012.

== Early life ==
Patterson attended Lawrence North High School in Indianapolis, Indiana, where he was a standout member of the football and track and field programs.

College recruiting
Name	Hometown	School	Height	Weight	40^{‡}	Commit date
William Patterson; DB	Indianapolis, Indiana	Lawrence North H.S.	5 ft 11 in (1.80 m)	206 lb (93 kg)	4.6	Nov 21, 2005
William Patterson; DB	Recruit ratings: Scout: Rivals: (NR)					
Overall recruit ranking: Scout: 243 (LB) Rivals: -- (DB), 9 (IN) ESPN: -- (DB)
‡ Refers to 40-yard dash; Note: In many cases, Scout, Rivals, 247Sports, On3, and ESPN may conflict in their listings of height, weight and 40 time.; In these cases, the average was taken. ESPN grades are on a 100-point scale.; Sources: "Indiana Football Commitment List". Rivals.; "Indiana College Football Recruiting Commits". Scout.; "ESPN". ESPN.; "Scout.com Team Recruiting Rankings". Scout.; "2006 Team Ranking". Rivals.com.

Patterson committed to Indiana University on November 21, 2005. It was Patterson's only FBS scholarship offer.

== College career ==
Patterson was an Indiana captain in both 2008 and 2009.

=== Statistics ===
Indiana Hoosiers
Season	Tackles						Interceptions				
Season	Solo	Ast	Total	Loss	Sacks	FF	Int	Yards	Avg	TD	PD
2006	26	15	41	4.5	1.0	1	1	7	7.0	0	4
2007	59	45	104	8.0	2.0	3	1	45	45.0	0	4
2008	42	13	55	8.5	1.5	0	1	0	0.0	0	4
2009	46	21	67	4.0	1.5	0	0	0	--	0	0
Career	173	94	267	25.0	6.0	4	3	52	17.3	0	12
