= Nolan Watson (baseball) =

American baseball player (born 1997)

- Pitcher
- Born: January 25, 1997 (age 29); Indianapolis, Indiana, U.S.
- Bats: Right Throws: Right
- Stats at Baseball Reference

Nolan Michael Watson (born January 25, 1997) is an American former professional baseball pitcher. He was drafted by the Kansas City Royals in the first round of the 2015 Major League Baseball draft, but never appeared in the major leagues.

== Career ==
At the time of the 2015 Major League Baseball draft, Watson was 5–1 for Lawrence North High School, with an 0.63 ERA and 70 strikeouts in 44 2/3 innings. Prior to the draft, he was ranked 56th by Baseball America's annual rankings of prospects. He committed to play college baseball for the Vanderbilt Commodores.

=== Kansas City Royals ===
After his senior year, the Kansas City Royals selected Watson with the 33rd overall pick in the draft. He signed for $1,825,200.

After signing, Watson was assigned to the rookie-level Burlington Royals, going 0–3 with a 4.91 ERA and 16 strikeouts in 11 starts. Watson spent 2016 with the Single-A Lexington Legends where he posted a 3–11 record, a 7.57 ERA, 60 strikeouts, and a 1.75 WHIP over 24 starts. In 2017, he played for Lexington, Burlington, and the rookie-level Arizona League Royals, appearing in 22 games (18 starts) where he struggled to a 1–12 record with a 7.87 ERA and 53 strikeouts. In 2018, Watson played for both Lexington and the High-A Wilmington Blue Rocks, pitching to a combined 10–10 record with a 5.24 ERA and 93 strikeouts in 24 total starts between both affiliates.

Watson began the 2019 season with Wilmington, but pitched in only one game due to injury. He underwent Tommy John surgery in May 2019. Watson did not play in a game in 2020 due to the cancellation of the minor league season because of the COVID-19 pandemic. Watson returned to action in 2021, splitting the season between the Double-A Northwest Arkansas Naturals and the High-A Quad Cities River Bandits. However, Watson struggled to a 6.30 ERA with 46 strikeouts in 75 2/3 innings of work. Watson elected free agency after the season on November 7, 2021.

=== San Diego Padres ===
On February 14, 2022, Watson signed a minor league contract with the San Diego Padres. He spent the year with the Double-A San Antonio Missions, posting a 4–6 record and 5.84 ERA with 94 strikeouts across 29 games (17 starts).

Watson split the 2023 campaign between San Antonio and the Triple-A El Paso Chihuahuas. In 26 games (23 starts) split between the two affiliates, he accumulated a 4–6 record and 5.21 ERA with 94 strikeouts across 91 innings pitched.

Watson made 8 starts Triple-A El Paso in 2024, working to a 4–2 record and 6.81 ERA with 38 strikeouts over 35 2/3 innings pitched. He elected free agency following the season on November 4, 2024.

=== CTBC Brothers ===
On June 5, 2025, Watson signed with the CTBC Brothers of the Chinese Professional Baseball League.
