= Sharyl Attkisson =

American writer, journalist, television reporter/correspondent

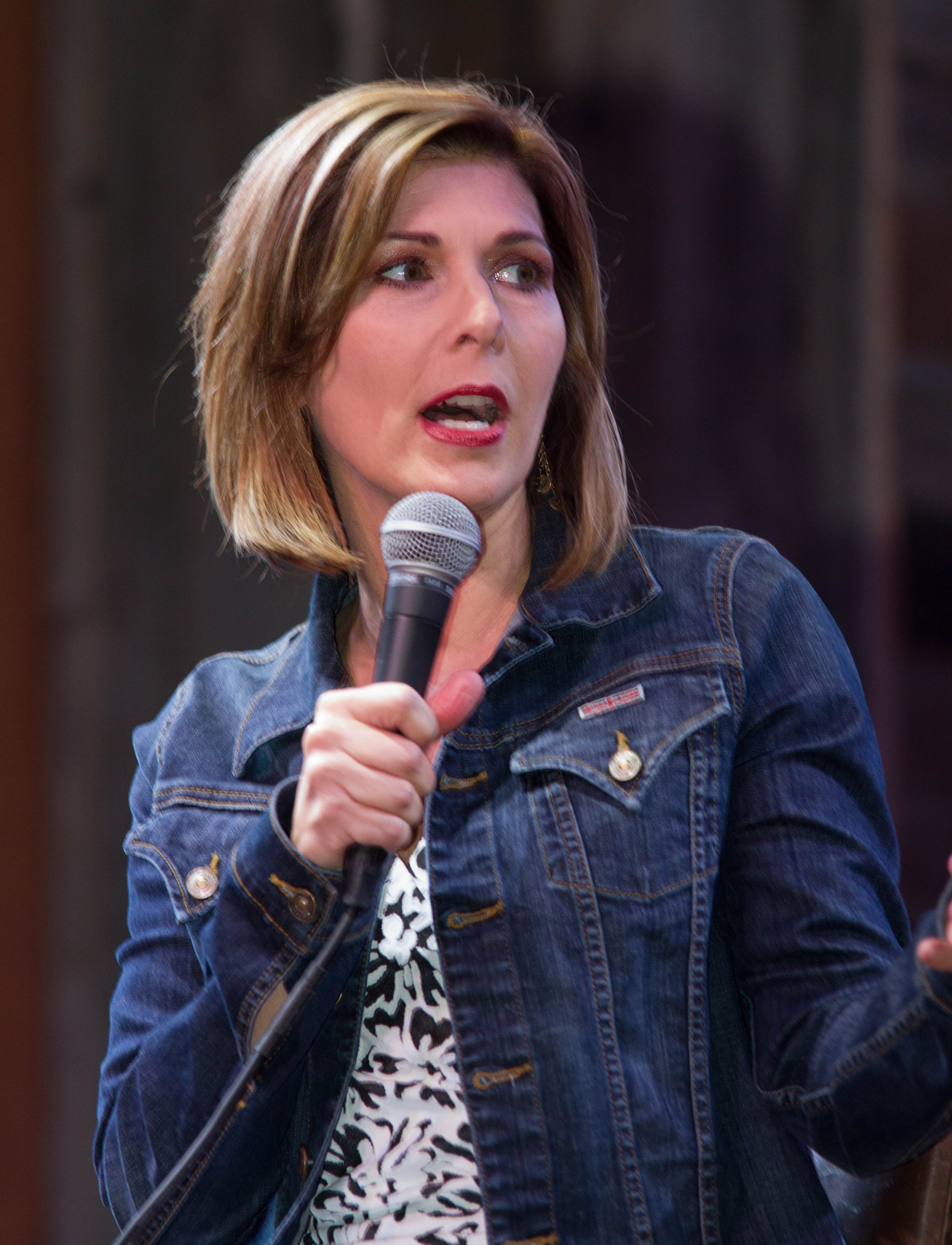
- Attkisson in 2014
- Born: January 26, 1961 (age 65); Sarasota, Florida, U.S.
- Education: Riverview High School, Sarasota, Florida; University of Florida
- Occupations: Writer, journalist, television correspondent
- Spouse: James Attkisson (m. 1984)
- Children: 1
- Website: sharylattkisson.com fullmeasure.news

Sharyl Attkisson (born January 26, 1961) is an American journalist and television correspondent. She hosts the Sinclair Broadcast Group TV show Full Measure with Sharyl Attkisson.

Attkisson is a five-time Emmy Award winner, and a Radio Television Digital News Association (RTNDA) Edward R. Murrow Award recipient. She was formerly an investigative correspondent in the Washington bureau for CBS News and a substitute anchor for the CBS Evening News and then went to The Daily Signal, a news feed from think tank The Heritage Foundation.

Attkisson resigned from CBS News in 2014, after 21 years with the network. She later wrote the book Stonewalled, in which she alleged that CBS News failed to give sufficient coverage of Barack Obama controversies, such as the 2012 Benghazi attack. Attkisson has received criticism for publishing stories suggesting a possible link between vaccines and autism, a claim that has been rejected by the scientific community.

== Early life and education ==
Attkisson, née Thompson, was born in Sarasota, Florida, into a family of seven children. She attended Wilkinson Elementary and Riverview High School. Her father was a lawyer, but she spent most of her life with her stepfather, an orthopedic surgeon. Attkisson attended the University of Florida, graduating in 1982 with a degree in broadcast journalism from the College of Journalism and Communications.

== Career ==
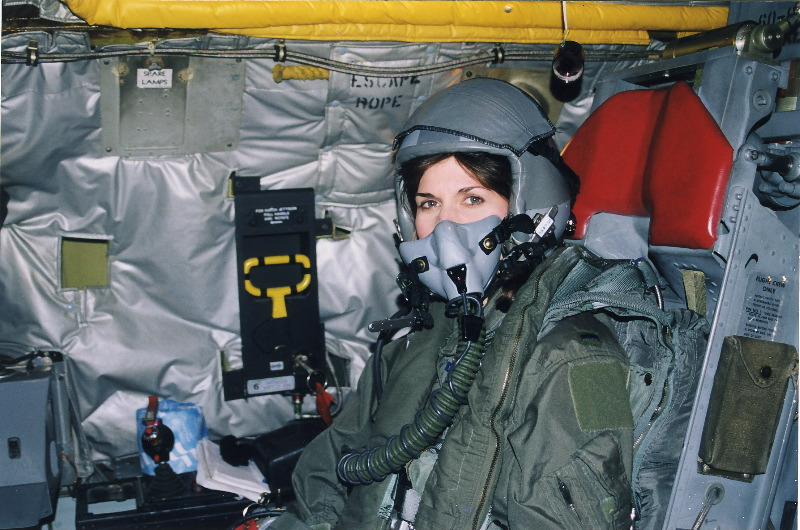
Attkisson on a USAF B-52 in April 1999

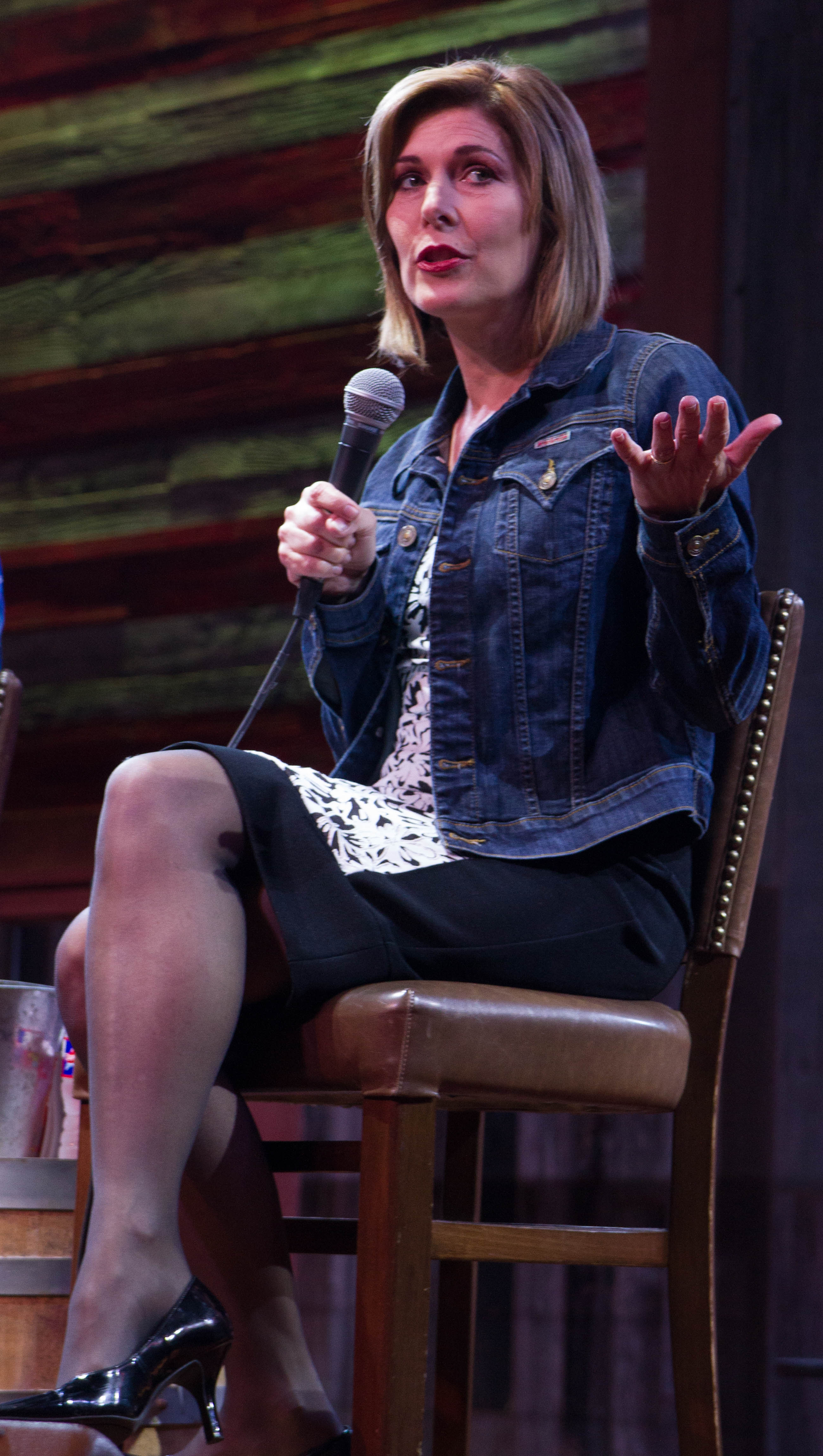
Attkisson at the Redneck Country Club music venue in Stafford, Texas in December 2014, where she spoke and signed copies of Stonewalled, a book she authored that year

Attkisson began her career in broadcast journalism as a reporter at WUFT-TV, the PBS station in Gainesville, Florida, in 1982. She later worked as an anchor and reporter at WTVX-TV in Fort Pierce/West Palm Beach from 1982 to 1985, at WBNS-TV, the CBS affiliate in Columbus, Ohio, from 1985 to 1986, and at WTVT in Tampa, from 1986 to 1990.

From 1990 to 1993, Attkisson was an anchor for CNN, and served as a key anchor for CBS covering space exploration in 1993. Attkisson left CNN in 1993, moving to CBS, where she anchored the television news broadcast CBS News Up to the Minute until January 1995, then became an investigative correspondent based in Washington, D.C.

She served on the University of Florida's Journalism College Advisory Board (1993–1997) and was its chair in 1996. The university gave her an Outstanding Achievement Award in 1997. From 1996 to 2001, Attkisson hosted the PBS health-news magazine HealthWeek.

Attkisson received an Investigative Reporters and Editors (I.R.E.) Finalist award for Dangerous Drugs in 2000. In 2001, Attkisson received an Investigative Emmy Award nomination for Firestone Tire Fiasco from the National Academy of Television Arts and Sciences.

In 2002, she co-authored the college textbook Writing Right for Broadcast and Internet News. Later that same year she won an Emmy Award for her investigative journalism about the American Red Cross. Attkisson was part of the CBS News team that received the RTNDA-Edward R. Murrow Awards in 2005 for Overall Excellence.

In 2006, Attkisson served as Capitol Hill correspondent for CBS, one of a small number of female anchors covering the 2006 midterms. Attkisson was a member of the CBS News team that received RTNDA-Edward R. Murrow Awards in 2008 for Overall Excellence.

In 2008, when Hillary Clinton said she dodged sniper fire in Bosnia, Attkisson, who was on the trip, refuted Clinton's account, saying the trip to Bosnia was risky but that there were no bullets to dodge. The Washington Post also expressed skepticism and reported that there were no 'documented security threats' included in a review of 100 news articles from the time. The day after Attkisson's report on the CBS Evening News, Clinton admitted there was no sniper fire and said she "misspoke".

In 2009, Attkisson won an Investigative Emmy Award for Business and Financial Reporting for her exclusive reports on the Troubled Asset Relief Program (TARP) and the bank bailout.

In 2010, Attkisson was nominated for two Emmy Awards for investigations into members of Congress and waste of tax dollars. In July 2011, Attkisson was again nominated, for Follow the Money investigations into Congressional travel to the Copenhagen climate summit, and problems with aid to Haiti earthquake victims.

In 2012, Attkisson received an award reporting on ATF's Fast and Furious gunwalker controversy from Accuracy in Media, a conservative news media watchdog group. In June 2012, Attkisson's investigative reporting for the gunwalker story also won the CBS Evening News the Radio and Television News Directors Association's National Edward R. Murrow Award for Excellence in Video Investigative Reporting. In July 2012, Attkisson's Gunwalker: Fast and Furious reporting received an Emmy Award.

The following year, Exposing the Business of Congress, which examined the impact of lobbyists on the United States Congress, was awarded an Emmy for investigative journalism in a newscast, while her work on Green Energy Going Red and Libya: Dying for Security led to nominations. Exposing the Business of Congress was also nominated for a 2013 Gerald Loeb Award in the broadcast category.

On March 10, 2014, Attkisson resigned from CBS News in what she stated was an "amicable" parting. Politico reported that according to sources within CBS there had been tensions leading to "months of hard-fought negotiations" – that Attkisson had been frustrated over what she perceived to be the network's liberal bias and lack of dedication to investigative reporting, as well as issues she had with the network's corporate partners, while some colleagues within the network saw her reporting as agenda-driven and doubted her impartiality. Erik Wemple, in his Washington Post blog, said CBS News had greater resources to deal with potential litigation than Attkisson as an individual and commented "if her nearly aired stories are as bulletproof as she suggests, where’s the risk?" He quoted Sonya McNair, a spokesman for CBS News, who had told him the operation "maintains the highest journalistic standards in what it chooses to put on the air. Those standards are applied without fear or favor."

Attkisson's book Stonewalled: One Reporter's Fight for Truth Against the Forces of Obstruction, Intimidation, and Harassment in Obama's Washington was published by Harper later in 2014 and became a New York Times best seller.

Her second book, The Smear: How Shady Political Operatives and Fake News Control What You See, What You Think, and How You Vote, was published by HarperCollins in summer 2017. It also became a New York Times best seller.

In 2017, Attkisson created a media bias chart that was reused by right-wing blog PJ Media and characterized as "a bastardization" of that produced by Ad Fontes Media. According to PolitiFact, this chart "labels anything not overtly conservative as 'left'". The news outlets with a purported left bias include the Associated Press, Reuters, the American television networks ABC, NBC/CNBC, and CBS, The New York Times, The Washington Post, CNN, NPR, Politico, and USA Today. BuzzFeed News reported in August 2018 that Attkisson indicated on her website that she compiled the "subjective" chart "from various sources and your feedback". She linked "various sources" to a study from the Pew Research Center, a Washington think tank that BuzzFeed said "measures audience bias, not the alleged bias of an outlet and a college library's website that cites another college library's project describing media outlets." Attkisson's chart includes such websites as InfoWars (to which Attkisson is reported to link from her own site).

Her book Slanted: How the News Media Taught us to Love Censorship and Hate Journalism was published in November 2020.

=== Anti-vaccine reporting ===
By 2014, Attkisson had published stories attempting to link vaccines with autism, a position rejected by the scientific community. Seth Mnookin, Professor of Science Writing at the Massachusetts Institute of Technology, described Attkisson as "one of the least responsible mainstream journalists covering vaccines and autism. Again and again, she's parroted anti-vaccine rhetoric long past the point that it's been decisively disproved."

According to Snopes, in a January 2019 episode of her television show Full Measure, Attkisson mischaracterized the significance of statements made in 2007 by a medical expert, Andrew Zimmerman, regarding a hypothetical relationship between vaccines and autism. Snopes said that Attkisson falsely claimed that the Omnibus Autism Proceeding (OAP), which refuted claims of a causal link between vaccines and autism, was based primarily on Zimmerman's testimony, and that Zimmerman's nuanced views on the subject were kept hidden from the public by the federal government until 2018. On the program, anti-vaccination activist Robert F. Kennedy Jr., called this "one of the most consequential frauds, arguably in human history." Per Snopes, the OAP's verdict that there is no causal link between vaccines and autism was based on testimony by nine expert witnesses, and the views that Attkisson said were kept secret had already been made public in 2006 and were mentioned in the OAP. Surgical oncologist David Gorski was sharply critical of the segment, calling it "nonsense" and a "conspiracy theory".

== Legal suits ==
=== Computer hacking allegations ===
In May 2013, while still employed by CBS, Attkisson alleged that her personal and work computers had been "compromised" for more than two years. CBS News stated that it had investigated her work computer and found evidence of multiple unauthorized accesses by a third party in late 2012. The U.S. Department of Justice denied any involvement.

In late January 2015, Attkisson appeared before the Senate Judiciary Committee during a confirmation hearing for Loretta Lynch, President Obama's nominee to replace outgoing Attorney General Eric Holder. As part of her appearance in front of that committee, a report by the Office of Inspector General (OIG) was released stating that "their investigation was not able to substantiate... allegations that Attkisson's computers were subject to remote intrusions by the FBI, other government personnel, or otherwise" and the deletion seen in Attkisson's video "appeared to be caused by the backspace key being stuck, rather than a remote intrusion".

In March 2015, Attkisson and her family filed suit in the Superior Court of the District of Columbia against Holder, Postmaster General Patrick R. Donahoe, and unnamed agents of the US Department of Justice, the US Postal Service and the United States, alleging that they had been subject to illegal surveillance activities. The government then moved her case to a D.C. federal court, and the case was eventually transferred to a federal court in Virginia. In 2017, federal judge Leonie Brinkema dismissed Attkisson's case, finding that Attkisson's lawsuit failed to allege sufficient facts to make a plausible claim that either defendant personally engaged in the alleged surveillance".

Attkisson appealed to the U.S. Court of Appeals for the Fourth Circuit in 2019, which affirmed the lower court's dismissal of the case. Two of the three judges on the panel agreed dismissal was justified because plaintiffs failed to name specific agents being accused of surveillance, and that they "failed to act diligently in pursuing that discovery", citing "significant periods of inactivity". Judge James Wynn Jr. wrote a dissenting opinion claiming that delays were not the fault of plaintiffs, but due to Justice Department lawyers deliberately using tactics to delay the process and "run out the clock" before Attkisson's lawyers could find those being accused. Judge Wynn found it plausible that "Attkisson never got a meaningful opportunity to pursue her claims".

In January 2020, Attkisson renewed her efforts, filing a complaint at federal courts in Baltimore, Maryland and Alexandria, Virginia alleging that the Obama administration had spied upon her and her family. She said in the Maryland deposition: "The plaintiffs first acquired the details regarding key individuals involved in the surveillance in August 2019 from a person involved in the wrongdoing who has come forward to provide information". In May 2020, Attkisson returned to this issue and said "I would say I may not be one of the first victims, but I am one of the first people who was able to identify myself as a target of illegal spying under the Obama administration". The source was later identified as Ryan White, an adherent of the QAnon conspiracy theory. Her lawsuit was dismissed by a federal judge in 2021, who ruled that Rosenstein was protected by qualified immunity and that, even if true, none of the allegations took place in Maryland, where the court has jurisdiction.

== Personal life ==
In 1984 Attkisson married James Attkisson, a sheriff's deputy, and with him has one daughter. Attkisson is a fifth-degree black belt master in tae kwon do.

== Bibliography ==
- Attkisson, Sharyl; Vaughan, Don R. (2002). Writing Right for Broadcast and Internet News. Allyn & Bacon.
- Attkisson, Sharyl (2014). Stonewalled: My Fight for Truth Against the Forces of Obstruction, Intimidation, and Harassment in Obama's Washington. HarperCollins Publishers.
- Attkisson, Sharyl (2017). The Smear: How Shady Political Operatives and Fake News Control What You See, What You Think, and How You Vote. HarperCollins Publishers.
- Attkisson, Sharyl (2020). Slanted: How the News Media Taught Us to Love Censorship and Hate Journalism. HarperCollins Publishers.
- Attkisson, Sharyl (2024). Follow the Science: How Big Pharma Misleads, Obscures, and Prevails. HarperCollins Publishers.
