= Julian Sinclair Smith =

American electrical engineer and television executive (1920–1993)

- Born: May 5, 1920; Baltimore, Maryland, U.S.
- Died: April 19, 1993 (aged 72); Baltimore, Maryland, U.S.
- Education: Johns Hopkins University (BS)
- Occupations: Electrical engineer Television executive
- Known for: Founding Sinclair Broadcast Group
- Spouse: Carolyn Beth Cunningham (m. 1949)
- Children: 4, including David

Julian Sinclair Smith (May 5, 1920 – April 19, 1993) was an American electrical engineer and television executive. He founded the Sinclair Broadcast Group, which grew from a single UHF television station in Baltimore to become one of the largest television broadcasting companies in the United States.

== Early life and education ==
Smith was born on May 5, 1920, in Baltimore, Maryland, the son of a grain exporter. He attended the Boys' Latin School of Maryland and developed an early interest in electronics. During World War II, he served in the U.S. Navy at the Great Lakes Naval Station, where he instructed navigators on sonar technology.

After the war, Smith studied electrical engineering at Johns Hopkins University while working as an engineer at WFBR-AM radio station. He graduated with a Bachelor of Science degree in 1952. Following graduation, he held aerospace engineering positions at Johns Hopkins' Applied Physics Laboratory, Martin Marietta, and Fairchild-Hiller. He also purchased and operated a downtown electronics trade school in Baltimore until 1979.

== Career ==
In 1958, Smith founded the Commercial Radio Institute, a broadcasting trade school in Baltimore, and applied for an FM radio license. In 1960, WFMM-FM (93.1 MHz) went on the air as a classical music station, with Smith building much of the equipment himself.

Anticipating the potential of UHF television, Smith applied for a UHF license after the Federal Communications Commission mandated UHF capabilities in new TV sets. In 1971, he launched WBFF-TV (Channel 45) in Baltimore under the Chesapeake Television Corporation. The station featured old movies, syndicated reruns, and children's programming, with startup costs of about $1.3 million and over $3 million invested in programs.

In 1974, Smith sold WFMM-FM and used the proceeds to acquire WPGH-TV in Pittsburgh. Expansion continued with stations in Columbus, Ohio (WTTE), Bloomington, Indiana (WIIB-TV, later WTTV), and St. Petersburg, Florida (WTTA).

In 1986, the company was incorporated as Sinclair Broadcast Group, named after him. His son David became CEO in 1988.

== Personal life and death ==
Smith married Carolyn Beth Cunningham in 1949. They had four sons: Frederick G. (a dentist and vice president), David D. (executive chairman), J. Duncan (vice president and secretary), and Robert E. (director).

Smith died on April 19, 1993, at his home in Roland Park, Baltimore, at age 72, after a long battle with Parkinson's disease. He was survived by his wife, four sons, two brothers, and 13 grandchildren.

== Legacy ==
The Julian Sinclair Smith Award, presented by the Columbus Metropolitan Library Foundation, honors contributions to education and lifelong learning, reflecting Smith's passion for knowledge.

Sinclair Broadcast Group, now Sinclair, Inc., operates nearly 200 television stations across the U.S.
