= Mark Hyman (commentator) =

American political commentator and TV executive

Mark E. Hyman is an American political commentator and former television executive. He was vice president for corporate relations for Sinclair Broadcast Group, the largest chain of local television stations in the United States, until 2005. Hyman became a visible presence during local news broadcasts over Sinclair's stations, many of which aired on The Point—a controversial daily televised commentary presented by Hyman. In 2010, Hyman's commentaries returned to select Sinclair-owned stations under the title Behind the Headlines with Mark Hyman.

== Biography ==
Hyman is a 1981 graduate of the United States Naval Academy and was a captain in the United States Navy Reserve. He was a vice president and spokesman of Sinclair Broadcast Group and until 2000 was its lobbyist in Washington, D.C.

== The Point ==
Beginning in 2001, he created conservative one-minute editorial segments called The Point that were broadcast on many of the group's 62 stations, at the end of local news programs.

The program became known for its political commentary. Hyman gave his opinions on topics such as perceived liberal bias in media, rise of agnosticism in America, and terrorism. During the 2004 US presidential election period he favored incumbent George W. Bush, and criticized Democratic opponent John Kerry. Sinclair Broadcast supported the US-led war in Iraq, and Hyman went to Iraq with a Sinclair news crew to find positive stories to counteract negative media coverage.

On November 2, 2006, after more than five years and 2,000 daily commentaries, Hyman announced he planned to drop his daily commentary at the end of the month, citing a desire to spend more time with his four children. The final The Point commentary aired on November 30.

== After The Point ==
Hyman continues to offer his conservative opinions in print and online for American Spectator magazine. Hyman's editorials returned to select Sinclair-owned stations in a dozen TV markets under the title Behind the Headlines with Mark Hyman in December 2010.

Hyman retired from Behind the Headlines in 2018, due to brain tumor that was later found to be non-cancerous.

He authored a book about various scandals in American history, published in October 2019: Washington Babylon: From George Washington to Donald Trump, Scandals that Rocked the Nation.
