= ExerciseTV =

American defunct video-on-demand service

- Company type: Joint venture
- Founded: January 2006; 20 years ago
- Owners: Comcast; Time Warner Cable; New Balance; Jake Steinfeld
- Key people: Chris Mansolillo; Jake Steinfeld
- Industry: Video on demand
- Employees: 8 (2009)

ExerciseTV was an American video-on-demand (VOD) service available to digital cable customers. The network received around eight million views every month.

ExerciseTV workouts ranged from cardio and abs to yoga, pilates and personal training.

== History ==
ExerciseTV was launched in January 2006 by Jake Steinfeld and was a joint venture between him, Comcast, Time Warner Cable, and New Balance. The service was managed by Comcast, with New Balance and Time Warner Cable acting as additional equity partners. It was available in the United States via the digital cable services of Comcast, Time Warner Cable, Cox Communications and Bresnan Communications.

ExerciseTV shut down on December 31, 2011.
