= Sportskool =

Sportskool is a US-based cable television network dedicated to sports instruction, exercise and entertainment. Sportskool was launched as a free on-demand channel in 2004 by Rainbow Media Holdings now known as AMC Networks, which at the time was a subsidiary of Cablevision. Sportskool was acquired in October, 2008 by Grace Creek Media, Inc, a television production and distribution company headquartered in Annapolis, MD. Sportskool's programming consists largely of sports, fitness and yoga instruction featuring professional athletes and coaches like Mia Hamm (soccer) Bode Miller (skiing) Misty May Trainor (volleyball) and Tony Gwynn (baseball) and the US Navy Seals (fitness). In 2010, Sportskool produced the six-part series "For Coaches & Parents: It's More Than A Game," with Hollywood actor and youth coach Sean Astin. The channel also features sports documentaries, including the original production "Yogi Berra: Deja Vu All Over Again", "Women and the Waves", and “Sean White: Wizard of Winter Games” among others.

US television providers carrying Sportskool’s free on-demand channel include Cablevision, Comcast, Time Warner, Brighthouse and Verizon FiOS, reaching more than 37 million households. Sportskool programming is also available through seven subscription channels on Roku and other streaming devices. Each subscription channel is dedicated to a specific sports category or activity. Channels include Sportskool Yoga, Fitness, Golf, Team Sports, Extreme Sports, Endurance Sports, and Women’s Sports. In 2012, Sportskool launched a 24/7 linear channel that is available in select markets around the world. Sportskool programming is available in a number of markets outside the US, including India, Indonesia, Singapore, Hong Kong, The Philippines, Malaysia, and Australia.

On May 9, 2013, Google announced that SportskooPlus would be among the first 53 paid subscription channels offered on YouTube.
