= Steve Bellamy =

American businessman

- Occupation(s): Sports; Entertainment
- Employer: Kodak
- Known for: founding: Tennis Channel; The Surf Channel; The Ski Channel
- Title: President of Motion Picture and Entertainment
- Board member of: Chairman, Action Sport Networks

Steve Bellamy is an entrepreneur in sports and entertainment known for founding niche cable television networks, including the Tennis Channel, The Surf Channel, The Skate Channel, and The Ski Channel. He is a writer/director/producer of six feature films, including Winter and The Story, and one of the producers of The Game Changers on Netflix. He is the inventor of LiveBall and the founder of the Tennis Channel Open. He was named the President of Motion Picture and Entertainment at Kodak in 2015.

== Early life and education ==
Bellamy attended Indiana University from 1983 to 1986 where he graduated with a business degree. He was the commencement speaker at that school in 2008 and won the university's Distinguished Entrepreneur Award in 2005.

== Career ==
Bellamy founded Atonal Tennis, Inc. in 1985 which owned and operated the Palisades Tennis Center, Cheviot Hills Tennis, Santa Monica Tennis Center, Westwood Tennis Center and Westchester Tennis Center. While running those tennis centers, Bellamy invented LiveBall which is played in tennis centers around the world.

=== Sports Channels ===
In 2001, The Tennis Channel (TTC) was founded by Steve Bellamy. The channel was launched in Spring 2003. Bellamy had planned to use the Tennis Channel Open, a Tennis Channel acquisition, as the core event as a part of a larger "Tennispalooza". In 2005, Bellamy left to start The Ski Channel.

In 2006, Bellamy became chief executive officer of Action Sport Networks. In April 2007, Bellamy announced the formation of The Ski Channel, which would focus on mountain-oriented sports, activities, and lifestyle. The channel, launched via his company Atonal Sports and Entertainment, signed a long-term agreement with Time Warner Cable.

During the 2012 US Open of Surfing in Huntington Beach, Bellamy announced that he was launching the Surf Channel, devoted to beach, water and board sports, lifestyle and travel, in mid-September.

In 2015, he was made chairman of Action Sport Networks. Bellamy was named Kodak President of Motion Picture and Entertainment in October 2015.

=== Atonal Sports and Entertainment ===
Atonal Sports and Entertainment owned and operated several tennis centers, a film company, Atonal Films and TV, and Palisades Sound Recording Studio. Atonal Films produced documentaries. Sports facilities owned by Atonal included the Palisades Tennis Center, Westwood Tennis Center, Cheviot Hills Tennis Center, Santa Monica Tennis Center and the LA Golf Academy.
