= Tennis Channel =

American television channel devoted to tennis

- Country: United States
- Broadcast area: Nationwide; International
- Headquarters: Santa Monica, California

Programming
- Language: English
- Picture format: 1080i (HDTV); 480i (SDTV)

Ownership
- Owner: Sinclair Broadcast Group
- Sister channels: The T; T2; Pickleballtv

History
- Launched: May 15, 2003; 23 years ago

Links
- Webcast: Live Feed
- Website: Official Website

Availability

Streaming media
- Service(s): DirecTV Stream, FuboTV, Sling TV, YouTube TV

Tennis Channel is an American sports digital cable and satellite television network owned by the Sinclair Television Group subsidiary of the Sinclair Broadcast Group. It is devoted to events and other programming related to the game of tennis, along with other racquet sports such as badminton, pickleball, and racquetball. Launched on May 15, 2003, the channel is headquartered in Santa Monica, California, and produces its programming out of an HD-capable broadcast center in the Los Angeles suburb of Culver City.

As of November 2023, Tennis Channel is available to approximately 38,000,000 pay television households in the United States-down from its 2019 peak of 63,000,000 households.

== History ==
In 2001, Tennis Channel was founded by Steve Bellamy in the shed in his backyard; Bellamy soon hired Bruce Rider to head up programming and marketing. A group known as the "Viacom Mafia"—a group that includes Viacom's former CEOs, Philippe Dauman and Frank Biondi, and current CEO, Thomas E. Dooley—became involved in the founding of the channel. This group invested and rounded up additional investors, Bain Capital Ventures, J.P. Morgan Partners, Battery Ventures, Columbia Capital, Pete Sampras and Andre Agassi, who as a group invested about $100 million. These founders felt with other single sports channel like the Golf Channel succeeding with a mostly male demographic and tennis having viewer of both sexes and of a desirable high-end demographic that a tennis channel would draw in advertisers. The channel officially launched on May 15, 2003, after its first live event, a Fed Cup tie in Lowell, Massachusetts, was broadcast in April as part of a "sneak preview". Barry MacKay was one of the original commentators.

In 2005, Tennis Channel acquired the ATP Tour's Franklin Templeton Tennis Classic in Scottsdale (which it had held the television rights to) from IMG, and moved it to Las Vegas as the Tennis Channel Open in 2006. Tennis Channel announced plans to hold women's and junior events alongside it.

In 2005, after struggling viewership (having only reached a subscriber base of 5 million by 2006), attributed to a lack of coverage of high-profile tournaments (such as the Grand Slam), the channel's David Meister was replaced by Ken Solomon. On February 1, 2006, Tennis Channel became a charter member of the new Association of Independent Programming Networks. Tennis Channel's senior vice president of distribution Randy Brown was a co-founder of the group, alongside The American Channel's Doron Gorshein.

Outbidding ESPN by more than double, Tennis Channel acquired the cable rights to the French Open in 2006. The network then sub-licensed approximately half of the package to ESPN, at a higher price than ESPN had offered to the French Tennis Federation for the entire package. In 2008, Tennis Channel sold the Tennis Channel Open event back to the ATP, citing growth of its core businesses tied to its rapid acquisitions of Grand Slam tournament rights; beginning 2009, Tennis Channel also split cable rights to the US Open with ESPN.

In April 2013, Al Jazeera Media Network was speculated as expressing interest in purchasing the channel to complement beIN Sports, though nothing came of this. The channel opened an online store selling professional and lifestyle golfing merchandise and gear on August 14, 2013. The store is operated by Delivery Agent under the Shop TV brand.

In 2013, Tennis Channel launched its TV Everywhere service Tennis Channel Everywhere. On May 25, 2014, the network also launched Tennis Channel Plus, a new direct-to-consumer subscription service including coverage of additional events not seen on television, also including digital rights to the French Open outside of the finals. Tennis Channel carriers receive a cut of profits from the service.

In 2015, Tennis Channel acquired rights to the Citi Open, an ATP World Tour 500 and WTA International tournament in Washington, D.C., under a four-year contract. The event was formerly part of the US Open Series, but withdrew due to frustration over ESPN (rightsholder of the series due to its new contract to be exclusive broadcaster of the US Open proper) only promising a limited amount of television coverage.

=== Sinclair era ===
On January 27, 2016, Sinclair Broadcast Group, the largest owner of over-the-air television stations in the United States, announced that it would acquire Tennis Channel for $350 million. In the statement announcing the purchase Sinclair CEO David Smith said that Tennis Channel had high-quality content and advertisers, though it had been valued low and was under-distributed. Sinclair also gets greater than $200 million of net operating losses to offset its future taxes. The deal was closed on March 2, 2016. Days later, Tennis Channel announced an extension to its contract for the French Open. In addition, citing its preference to hold rights to the entire tournament, ESPN dropped its sub-licensing agreement with Tennis Channel for the French Open, giving it exclusive cable rights to the tournament (with NBC continuing to be the broadcast television rightsholder).

In March 2017, Sinclair additionally acquired Tennis magazine and Tennis.com, seeking to integrate Tennis Channel with them to boost its cross-platform presence.

In October 2018, it was announced that Tennis Channel had acquired rights to the 46 overseas events of the WTA Tour under a five-year deal beginning in 2019, replacing beIN Sports. beIN had acquired the WTA Tour rights as part of a larger deal covering 30 countries, but the deal faced criticism from U.S. viewers due to the network's narrow carriage (only serving half as many households as Tennis Channel, with several top providers having also dropped the channel that August), as well as frequent scheduling conflicts favoring soccer coverage.

In 2019, Tennis Channel reached a five-year extension of its rights to the Citi Open. The tournament also re-joined the US Open Series under new ownership.

In October 2020, Tennis Channel renewed its rights to the ATP Tour, and also added rights to Masters 1000 events held in North America beginning in 2021 (previously aired by ESPN under a separate contract). This made Tennis Channel the exclusive U.S. broadcaster of all Masters 1000 events.

== On-air personalities ==
- Prakash Amritraj
- Paul Annacone
- Jimmy Arias
- Tracy Austin
- James Blake
- Danielle Collins
- Jim Courier
- Lindsay Davenport
- Vicky Duval
- Jan-Michael Gambill
- Brett Haber
- Dani Klupenger
- Mark Knowles
- Nick Monroe
- Kamau Murray
- Martina Navratilova
- Nicolas Pereira
- Andrea Petkovic
- Ted Robinson
- Andy Roddick
- Chanda Rubin
- Leif Shiras
- Coco Vandeweghe
- Steve Weissman
- Jon Wertheim
- Ari Wolfe

== Streaming channels ==
- Tennis Channel (formerly Tennis Channel Plus from 2014–2024), a subscription streaming service featuring overflow content that was not aired on television. In November 2024, Tennis Channel Plus was replaced by a direct-to-consumer version of Tennis Channel, adding access to programming from the cable network. Tennis Channel Plus content also became available at no additional charge via TV Everywhere authentication for existing television subscribers.
- The T (2018), a free streaming channel with best-of programming, offered through the Tennis Channel app/website.
- T2 (2022), a free ad-supported streaming television (FAST) channel primarily for overflow live tennis matches not airing on Tennis Channel. The channel is found on FAST channel aggregators such as Amazon Freevee and The Roku Channel, as well as over-the-top streaming services Hulu with Live TV and YouTube TV which carry the main channel. 22 ATSC 3.0 broadcast television stations controlled by Sinclair also include T2 as a virtual channel; though it appears to receivers as a typical digital subchannel, it is streamed using the television's Internet connection instead of through the broadcast signal.
- Pickleballtv (PBTV), an ad-supported pickleball streaming channel launched in November 2023 that is co-owned with the United Pickleball Association, the parent company of the Professional Pickleball Association Tour (PPA Tour) and Major League Pickleball (MLP). The network is available through Tennis Channel's app/website and pickleballtv.com's dedicated website, as well as several other streaming platforms such as Plex TV, FuboTV, Amazon Fire TV and Roku.

== Programming ==
The network broadcasts live tournaments, news, one-on-one interviews, game analysis and skills instruction. Tennis Channel provides extensive coverage of the Davis Cup, Billie Jean King Cup and Hopman Cup as well as other tournaments throughout the year. Until 2025, Tennis Channel was the exclusive cable rightsholder of the French Open; while it previously sub-licensed portions of this coverage to ESPN, this arrangement ended in 2015. Rights to the tournament moved to TNT Sports under an agreement reached in June 2024.

=== Original series ===
- ATP … Tennis (in 2004). Weekly series on the ATP tours.
- Bag Check (in 2004). A look at what is in pro players' racquet bag.
- Center Court with Chris Myers (in 2004). Interview show with top pros and coaches.
- Girls on Tour (in 2004). Behind-the-scenes with the WTA Tour.
- Inside Tennis with the Koz (in 2004). David Kozlowski hosted tip and interview show.
- Match Point America (in 2004). Weekly professional circuits highlight magazine show.
- No Strings (in 2004). Personal lives of the pros.
- One-Minute Clinic (in 2004). Top coaches run live-action tennis technique drills.
- Open Access 04 (in 2004). Follows the tours giving "a first-hand account of the top players outside the lines."
- Pro File (in 2004). Profiling top and upcoming players on both tours.
- Tennis Insiders (in 2004). On-location panel discussion.
- On Court with USPTA (in 2004). Instructional show.
- Dennis Van der Meer (in 2004) Host is PTR founder and president. PTR is a tennis teacher and coach educating and certifying company.
- The Changeover (in 2018) Sports, travel and pop culture collide as Freedom Wynn and his famous friends travel around the country exploring tennis and much more.
- Good Trouble With Nick Kyrgios (in 2024) Nick Kyrgios' video podcast series where he explores celebrities' personal journeys
- Served with Andy Roddick (in 2024) "A weekly adjacent podcast with the former World No. 1 for all things tennis and more!"

=== High-definition ===
The Tennis Channel launched an HD simulcast on December 31, 2007.

== Carriage disputes ==
On September 4, 2011 during the US Open, Tennis Channel pulled its signal from Verizon FiOS, Cablevision, Suddenlink Communications, Mediacom, WOW!, Knology and General Communication Inc. systems after the providers declined to accept a new agreement that the Tennis Channel made with the National Cable Television Cooperative (a group which the seven providers are members). Along with a fee increase, the agreement also required that the Tennis Channel be moved from their optional sports package to their digital basic tiers. Tennis Channel returned to Verizon FiOS on January 17, 2012.

In July 2012, the Federal Communications Commission ruled in favor of Tennis Channel following a three-year dispute between the network and Comcast over placement on extra-fee sports tier. As a result of the ruling, Comcast was prompted to remove Tennis Channel from its sports package tier, available to customers via an extra charge, and carry the network on the same basic cable tier as Comcast-owned Golf Channel and NBCSN. The FCC found Comcast's previous handling of the network to be discriminatory. This marked the first time that a cable distributor was found to have violated federal anti-discrimination rules. Comcast successfully disputed the ruling in 2013, continuing to carry Tennis Channel on its sports package. Tennis Channel appealed to the Supreme Court, but was denied a hearing.
