= List of radio stations in Delaware =

The following is a list of radio stations in the U.S. state of Delaware, which can be sorted by their call signs, frequencies, cities of license, and formats.

== Stations ==
List of radio stations in Delaware
Call sign	Frequency	City of license	Format	Notes
WAFL	97.7 FM	Milford	Contemporary hit radio	
WCHK-FM	101.3 FM	Milford	Country	
WDDE	91.1 FM	Dover	Public radio (NPR)	
WDEL	1150 AM	Wilmington	Talk radio	
WDOV	1410 AM	Dover	Talk radio	
WDSD	94.7 FM	Dover	Country	
WGMD	92.7 FM	Rehoboth Beach	Talk radio	
WHGE-LP	95.3 FM	Wilmington	Community radio/variety	
WIHW-LP	96.1 FM	Dover	Christian radio	
WILM	1450 AM	Wilmington	Talk radio	
WIZU-LP	99.9 FM	Newark	Community radio/science talk	
WJKI-FM	103.5 FM	Bethany Beach	Classic rock	
WJWL	900 AM	Georgetown	Regional Mexican	
WKDB	95.3 FM	Laurel	Spanish contemporary hits	
WKNZ	88.7 FM	Harrington	Christian contemporary	
WLBW	92.1 FM	Fenwick Island	Christian contemporary (K-Love)	
WMHS	88.1 FM	Pike Creek	Campus/variety (Red Clay Consolidated School District)	
WMPH	91.7 FM	Wilmington	Campus/variety (Brandywine School District)	
WNCL	930 AM	Milford	Classic hits	
WNJD	102.3 FM	Hartly	Talk radio	
WOCM	98.1 FM	Selbyville	Album adult alternative	
WRBG-LP	106.5 FM	Millsboro	Community radio/variety	
WRDX	92.9 FM	Smyrna	Adult contemporary	
WRTX	91.7 FM	Dover	Public radio/classical/jazz	(Note: Satellite of WRTI.)
WSTW	93.7 FM	Wilmington	Contemporary hit radio	
WSUX	1280 AM	Seaford	Spanish adult hits	
WTMC	1380 AM	Wilmington	Traffic reports (DDOT)	
WUSX	98.5 FM	Seaford	Talk radio	
WVCW	99.5 FM	Wilmington	Christian radio (VCY America)	
WVUD	91.3 FM	Newark	College/free-form (University of Delaware)	
WWSX-LP	99.1 FM	Rehoboth Beach	Album adult alternative	
WWTX	1290 AM	Wilmington	Sports radio (FSR)	
WXDE	105.9 FM	Lewes	Talk radio	
WXHL-FM	89.1 FM	Christiana	Urban gospel	
WXHM	91.9 FM	Middletown	Urban gospel	(Note: Satellite of WXHL-FM.)
WZBH	93.5 FM	Millsboro	Active rock	
WZEB	101.7 FM	Ocean View	Rhythmic contemporary	

== Defunct ==
- WNWK
- WRJE

== See also ==
- Delaware § Media

== Bibliography ==
- Chas. A. Alicoate, ed. (1957), "Amplitude Modulation Stations - AM: Delaware", Radio Annual and Television Yearbook, New York: Radio Daily Corp., OCLC 10512206 – via Internet Archive
- "AM Stations in the U.S.: Delaware", Radio Annual Television Year Book, New York: Radio Television Daily, 1963, OCLC 10512375 – via Internet Archive
