= WAMS =

WAMS may refer to:

- WAMS-LD, a low-power television station (channel 29, virtual 35) licensed to serve Minster-New Bremen, Ohio, United States
- WKHI (FM), a radio station (94.9 FM) licensed to serve Newark, Maryland, United States, which held the call sign WAMS from 2016 to 2018
- WICO-FM, a radio station (101.1 FM) licensed to serve Snow Hill, Maryland, which held the call sign WAMS-FM from 2011 to 2014
- WGBG (AM), a radio station (1590 AM) licensed to serve Ocean City, Maryland, known as WAMS in 2011 and 2012
- WRJE, a radio station (1600 AM) licensed to serve Dover, Delaware, United States, known as WAMS from 2000 to 2002, in 2007, and from 2009 to 2011
- WNWK, a defunct radio station (1260 AM) licensed to serve Newark, Delaware, known as WAMS from 2002 to 2007
- WTMC, a radio station (1380 AM) licensed to serve Wilmington, Delaware, known as WAMS prior to 2000
- Windows Azure Media Services, a PaaS offering for video encoding, content protection, streaming, and/or analytics.
