= WBAL =

WBAL may refer to:

- WBAL (AM), a radio station (1090 AM) licensed to Baltimore, Maryland, United States
- WBAL-TV, a television station (channel 12, virtual 11) licensed to Baltimore, Maryland, United States
- WIYY-FM, a radio station (97.9 FM) licensed to Baltimore, Maryland, United States, which formerly used the call sign WBAL-FM
