= WXXY (disambiguation) =

WXXY is the call sign of a radio station in Houghton, New York.

WXXY or WXXY-FM was formerly the call sign of these stations:

- WRJE 1600 AM (Dover, Delaware) (2007–2009)
- WEHA 88.7 FM (Port Republic, New Jersey) (2003–2008)
- WPNA-FM 103.1 FM (Niles, Illinois) (1998–2003)
