= WJKI =

WJKI may refer to:

- WJKI (AM), a radio station (1320 AM) licensed to serve Salisbury, Maryland, United States
- WJKI-FM, a radio station (103.5 FM) licensed to serve Bethany Beach, Delaware, United States
