= WSRY =

- Elkton, Maryland; United States
- Frequency: 1550 kHz
- Branding: Reach Gospel Radio

Programming
- Format: Urban gospel

Ownership
- Owner: Priority Radio, Inc.
- Sister stations: WXHL-FM 89.1 FM Christiana, Delaware; WXHM 91.9 FM Middletown, Delaware

History
- First air date: August 22, 1963
- Former call signs: WSER (1963–2002); WXHL (2002–2005)

Technical information
- Licensing authority: FCC
- Facility ID: 21621
- Class: D
- Power: 1,000 watts day 1 watt night
- Transmitter coordinates: 39°35′45″N 75°47′50″W
- Translators: 100.9 W265BG (Elkton); 107.3 W297CA (Wilmington, Delaware)

Links
- Public license information: Public file; LMS
- Webcast: Listen Live
- Website: reachgospelradio.com

WSRY (1550 AM) is a radio station broadcasting an urban gospel music format. Licensed to Elkton, Maryland, United States. The station is currently owned by Priority Radio, Inc.

== History ==
The station's call letters were WSER when it first signed on. The day was Thursday, August 22, 1963, and as "the transmitter came to life with regular programming for Cecil County" listeners heard a special opening ceremony. County and town officials were on hand, and the Rev. Howard O. Van Sice, pastor of the First Baptist Church of Elkton, gave the invocation."

For nearly 40 years, the studio on Maloney Road just outside of Elkton was the County's daytime spot on the dial, the airwaves being filled with conversation about Cecil County in between the hits of the day.

The station was a starting point for many broadcasting careers, including that of late ESPN personality Tom Mees. Brian Barrabee's First Philadelphia Properties sold the station in late 1999 to a Delaware-based religious group (Faith City Church) and it became a Moody Broadcasting affiliate in February 2000, later simulcasting WXHL-FM's Contemporary Christian music programming. The station changed its call letters to WXHL on February 15, 2002. The station changed its call sign to the current WSRY and became an ESPN/all sports station in 2005, later reverting to simulcasting WXHL-FM in 2009.
