= WVBH (FM) =

- Beach Haven West, New Jersey; United States
- Broadcast area: Ocean County, New Jersey
- Frequency: 88.3 MHz
- Branding: Reach Gospel Radio

Programming
- Format: Urban gospel

Ownership
- Owner: Priority Radio, Inc.

History
- First air date: 2000; 26 years ago

Technical information
- Licensing authority: FCC
- Facility ID: 89740
- Class: A
- ERP: 100 watts
- HAAT: 130 meters (430 ft)
- Transmitter coordinates: 39°42′56″N 74°17′32″W
- Translator: W276CW 103.1 MHz (Atlantic City)

Links
- Public license information: Public file; LMS
- Website: reachgospelradio.com

WVBH (88.3 FM, "Reach Gospel Radio") is a radio station licensed to Beach Haven West, New Jersey serving the Monmouth/Ocean radio market. The station is owned by Priority Radio, Inc. It airs an urban gospel format rebroadcasting WXHL-FM from Newark, Delaware.

The station was assigned the WVBH call letters by the Federal Communications Commission on April 28, 2000.

The Call letters stand for "Voice of Beach Haven".

== Coverage area ==
The station covers Ocean and northern Atlantic Counties in New Jersey on 88.3 FM.

The WVBH antenna is co-located with WBBO-FM and WCHR-FM on a tower located near the intersection of Route 72 and the Garden State Parkway in Manahawkin.

== Ownership ==
In November 2003, Priority Radio Inc. reached a deal to acquire the construction permit for WVBH from JC Radio Inc. The reported sale price was $400,000.
