= WKHW =

WKHW may refer to:

- WKHW (FM), a radio station (88.5 FM) licensed to serve Halifax, Pennsylvania, United States
- WBBX (FM), a radio station (106.1 FM) licensed to serve Pocomoke City, Maryland, United States, which held the call sign WKHW from 1996 to 2009
