= WGXM =

WGXM may refer to:

- WGXM (FM), a radio station (91.1 FM) licensed to serve Calypso, North Carolina, United States
- WEHA, a radio station (88.7 FM) licensed to serve Port Republic, New Jersey, United States, which held the call sign WGXM from 2008 to 2009
