= WDDE =

Public radio station in Dover, Delaware

- Dover, Delaware; United States
- Frequency: 91.1 MHz (FM)

Programming
- Language: English
- Format: Public affairs/News/Talk
- Affiliations: BBC World Service; National Public Radio; Public Radio International

Ownership
- Owner: Delaware First Media Corporation

History
- First air date: August 17, 2012
- Call sign meaning: Dover, DElaware

Technical information
- Licensing authority: FCC
- Facility ID: 175387
- Class: A
- ERP: 2,100 watts
- HAAT: 72 meters (236 ft)
- Transmitter coordinates: 39°00′49.6″N 75°30′29.3″W

Links
- Public license information: Public file; LMS
- Website: www.delawarepublic.org

WDDE (91.1 FM) is an NPR-member radio station based out of Dover, Delaware. It is owned and operated by Delaware First Media Corporation, and is the first and only full-fledged public radio station based in Delaware. WDDE's studios are located at cottage number 504 for sponsored programs on the Delaware State University campus on College Road, and its transmitter is located on Mid State Road in Frederica near Felton, Delaware.

WDDE broadcasts a variety of national and international programming from NPR, BBC World Service, and Public Radio International as well as local news created by WDDE's staff. WDDE's website features multimedia coverage of Delaware, including 24/7 live streaming audio coverage, archived stories from WDDE and its online predecessor, DFM News, and timely special events coverage from political debates to concerts.

WMPH 91.7 and WMHS 88.1 in Wilmington simulcasts WDDE's programming on weekday mornings and afternoons. The station is working to build additional repeaters in the rest of the state.

Although WDDE has a collaborative partnership with both Delaware State University and the University of Delaware, it is run independently from both institutions.

== History ==
WDDE traces its roots to 2010, when several longtime Delaware journalists founded Delaware First Media and launched DFM News, an online news site focused on Delaware news. Many of them had worked at WHYY-FM-TV in Philadelphia, and had been laid off when the stations scaled back coverage of Delaware events. The move particularly rankled Delaware residents and elected officials, since WHYY-TV is licensed to Wilmington. Indeed, Wilmington city officials went as far as to challenge the renewal of WHYY-TV's license in 2009.

A year later, they learned that a construction permit for a noncommercial station in Dover was on the verge of expiring. Maryland's Salisbury University, owner of WSCL, the NPR member for the Delmarva Peninsula, had won the permit in 2007, but opted not to use it. With the support of former Weekend Edition Sunday host Liane Hansen, who now lives in Bethany Beach, Delaware First Media secured the backing needed for a full-fledged NPR member station. In 2011, Delaware First Media briefly brought the station online in 2011 as a repeater of WSCL's sister station, WSDL in Ocean City, before taking it offline pending its full launch.

WDDE began broadcasting on August 17, 2012 from its studio on the Delaware State University campus in Dover. Philadelphia's two full NPR members, WHYY-FM and WRTI, have long claimed much of Delaware as part of their primary coverage areas; the latter has long operated repeaters in Wilmington and Dover. However, until WDDE's launch, Delaware had been the only state without a full-fledged NPR station within its borders.

The station's first president, Micheline Boudreau was previously head of WHYY's Dover bureau and reported for Delaware Tonight, the long-running news program that was canceled in the 2009 cutback. Another WHYY alumnus, Tom Byrne is the station's news director. Jane Vincent is the current president of the station.

== See also ==
- Institute for Nonprofit News (member)
