= WGMD =

- Logo since 2022
- Rehoboth Beach, Delaware; United States
- Broadcast area: Sussex County, Delaware; Worcester County, Maryland; Kent County, Delaware; Wicomico County, Maryland
- Frequency: 92.7 MHz

Programming
- Format: Talk
- Affiliations: Fox News Radio; AccuWeather; Compass Media Networks; Genesis Communications Network; Premiere Networks; Salem Radio Network; USA Radio Network; Westwood One; Baltimore Orioles Radio Network; Baltimore Ravens Radio Network; Philadelphia Phillies Radio Network

Ownership
- Owner: DataTech Digital, LLC
- Sister stations: WUSX

History
- First air date: September 21, 1975 (as WLRB)
- Former call signs: WLRB (1975–1980)
- Call sign meaning: Initials in the original partners' names

Technical information
- Licensing authority: FCC
- Facility ID: 55906
- Class: A
- ERP: 2,600 watts
- HAAT: 132 meters (433 ft)
- Transmitter coordinates: 38°42′14.8″N 75°11′59.3″W
- Repeater: 98.5 WUSX (Seaford)

Links
- Public license information: Public file; LMS
- Webcast: Listen live
- Website: thetalkofdelmarva.com

WGMD (92.7 FM) is a radio station licensed to serve Rehoboth Beach, Delaware, Sussex County and the five other counties known as Delmarva. The station has been owned by the same family since 1980. In 2022, the company transitioned its ownership when the next generation purchased WGMD from its original owners. Resort Broadcasting Company, LLC, which operated WGMD from 1980 to 2022 is now DataTech Digital which includes WUSX in Seaford. Both air a news, talk, and sports radio format. The station has been assigned these call letters by the Federal Communications Commission since March 30, 1980.

On December 1, 2021, WGMD began simulcasting on WUSX (98.5 FM) in Seaford.

The station's registered trademark is "The TALK Of Delmarva".

== Format ==
WGMD, The Talk of Delmarva, can be heard on 92.7 or 98.5. Some shows and special events can be viewed at TheTalkofDelmarva.com or IndustryNewsOnline.com. The Talk of Delmarva features 11 hours of local programming featuring Mike Bradley, Jake Smith, MJ Powell, and Max Powers. Syndicated radio includes Dan Bongino, Rob Carson, Charlie Kirk, Mark Levin, Sean Hannity, BIll O'Reilly, Rita Crosby, and George Noory. Weekend programming includes local talk with Max Powers, the Rehoboth Foodie, The Pet Show, The Car Doctor, and The Dirt Doctor, among others. WGMD is also an affiliate of the Baltimore Orioles Radio Networks and NASCAR on weekends.

== Local and regional news ==
In 2018 and 2019 WGMD was recognized as Best News and Best Sports station downstate by the readers of Delaware Today magazine.

Additionally, WGMD News placed in the 2020 national competition of the National Federation of Press Women.

As a radio affiliate of the Maryland News Network, WGMD broadcasts daily agricultural reports, daily morning and afternoon traffic reports and other features of local and regional interests.

== National news ==
Local and regional news is supplemented by Fox News Radio.

== Weather ==
Hourly Weather and Marine Weather services are provided by AccuWeather.
