= WWTX =

Coordinates: 39°44′3″N 75°31′44″W

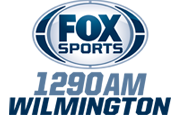
- Wilmington, Delaware; United States
- Broadcast area: Wilmington metropolitan area
- Frequency: 1290 kHz
- Branding: Fox Sports 1290

Programming
- Format: Sports
- Affiliations: Fox Sports Radio; Baltimore Orioles Radio Network; Baltimore Ravens Radio Network

Ownership
- Owner: iHeartMedia, Inc.; (iHM Licenses, LLC)
- Sister stations: WILM (AM), WDOV, WDSD, WRDX

History
- First air date: April 21, 1947; 79 years ago (as WTUX)
- Former call signs: WTUX (1947–1978); WJBR (1978–2003)

Technical information
- Licensing authority: FCC
- Facility ID: 14373
- Class: D
- Power: 2,500 watts days 32 watts nights
- Repeater: 92.9 WRDX-HD2 (Smyrna)

Links
- Public license information: Public file; LMS
- Webcast: Listen Live
- Website: foxsports1290am.iheart.com

WWTX (1290 kHz) is a commercial AM radio station licensed to Wilmington, Delaware. It airs a sports radio format, with most programming from Fox Sports Radio. The studios are on McKee Road in Dover.

WWTX is a Class D radio station. It transmits 2,500 watts daytime, using a non-directional antenna. To protect other stations from interference, at night it reduces power to 32 watts. The transmitter is on East 7th Street in Wilmington, near Brandywine Creek. Programming is also heard on the HD Radio digital subchannel of sister station 92.9 WRDX.

== Programming ==
WWTX carries most of the Fox Sports Radio national line up, including Dan Patrick and Colin Cowherd in middays. It serves as the flagship station for University of Delaware Fightin' Blue Hens Women's Basketball and also broadcasts local high school football and high school basketball games. It carries Baltimore Orioles baseball and Baltimore Ravens football games.

The high school football season schedule begins with the DFRC Kickoff Classic and concludes with the DIAA State Championship each year. In the summer, Fox Sports 1290, along with partner station WDOV simulcast the DFRC Blue-Gold All*Star Game benefiting Delawareans with intellectual disabilities. Included in WWTX high school baseball coverage are the semifinal and championship games of the DIAA State Tournament. Matt Janus, the 2014 NSSA Delaware Sportscaster of the Year winner, handles play-by-play duties for Blue Hens Women's Basketball on 1290 AM. 2011 NSSA Delaware Sportswriter of the Year, Jon Buzby, and Marty Sheehan team up for high school sports broadcasts.

== History ==
The station signed on the air in 1949. Its original call sign was WTUX. It started out as a daytimer, powered at 500 watts and required to go off the air at sunset. It was owned by Port Frere Broadcasting with studios at 1496 Market Street in Wilmington.

In 1976, the Reynolds Family, who owned successful FM station WJBR, acquired WTUX, to combine with 99.5 MHz. At first, WTUX continued its Middle of the Road (MOR) format, with adult popular music, news and sports. But a few years later, management decided to make 1290 AM a simulcast of WJBR-FM, with both stations playing beautiful music. They aired quarter-hour sweeps of mostly soft instrumental music, with some Broadway and Hollywood show tunes.

Over time, WJBR 1290 was given permission to increase its power to 2,500 watts and add nighttime service at 32 watts. In 1985, WJBR-AM-FM were sold to CRB Broadcasting, which later was acquired by Capstar Broadcasting. Capstar was later folded into Clear Channel Communications, the forerunner to today's iHeartMedia. Meanwhile, WJBR-FM was sold to the NextMedia Group for $32.4 million.

In 2003, WJBR changed its callsign to WWTX. It became a Fox Sports Radio network affiliate. In September 2014 WWTX rebranded as "Fox Sports 1290" after 11 years as "1290 The Ticket".
