= WILM (AM) =

- Wilmington, Delaware; United States
- Broadcast area: Philadelphia metropolitan area
- Frequency: 1450 kHz
- Branding: News Radio 1450 WILM

Programming
- Format: News/Talk
- Affiliations: Fox News Radio; Compass Media Networks; Premiere Networks; Salem Radio Network

Ownership
- Owner: iHeartMedia, Inc.; (iHM Licenses, LLC)
- Sister stations: WRDX, WDOV, WDSD, WWTX

History
- First air date: 1928; 98 years ago
- Former call signs: WTBQ (1928–1929)
- Call sign meaning: Wilmington

Technical information
- Licensing authority: FCC
- Facility ID: 16438
- Class: C
- Power: 1,000 watts unlimited
- Transmitter coordinates: 39°44′03″N 75°31′43″W
- Repeater: 94.7 WDSD-HD2 (Dover)

Links
- Public license information: Public file; LMS
- Webcast: Listen live (via iHeartRadio)
- Website: wilm.iheart.com

WILM (1450 kHz) is a news/talk AM radio station broadcasting in Wilmington, Delaware. The station is owned by iHeartMedia. WILM is known as the station where radio and television talk show Joe Pyne developed the confrontational style now standard in radio and TV talk shows. Another well-known WILM personality was Tom Mees (ESPN) who worked at the station in the 1970s.

== History ==
WILM signed on the air in 1928, as WTBQ, then in 1929, the call-letters changed to WILM.

During the 1930s and 1945 WLIM was an NBC Blue Network affiliate carrying shows, and News, during a Golden Age of Radio.

In the 1950s and 1960s WILM, under the ownership of Ewing Hawkins, experimented with various music formats, including Top-40 and MOR (middle-of-the-road). For a time, the WILM deejays were known as the "Flip Top Jocks." One of the program directors was Dean Tyler, who would later go on to be an influential broadcaster and manager in Philadelphia radio. In the early 1970s WILM adopted an Adult contemporary music format and featured an all-night block of rhythm and blues music geared to the city's African-American community. At this time, the station was affiliated with the Mutual Broadcasting System.

In January 1976, WILM switched to an all-news format, using the short-lived NIS (News and Information Service), operated by NBC. When the NIS ceased operations shortly thereafter, WILM continued on with its news format. Eventually the station modified its format and affiliated with the CBS radio network for news and features. The station also kept a secondary affiliation with the Mutual Broadcasting System, which carried The Larry King Show.

By the 1990s, WILM had added syndicated talk programming throughout its lineup. The station became one of the first to add, then, the first to drop Rush Limbaugh's daily show from its schedule. A former program director said the decision was made due to incompatibilities with sales and audience demand but has since acknowledged the station chose not to pay increased carriage fees. During this period, another Wilmington station with a stronger signal, WDEL also adopted a full-time news and talk format, beginning direct competition with WILM, including picking up Rush Limbaugh's program.

By 2000, WILM began to shift toward talk radio. Mike Gallagher's syndicated show joined local host John Watson on the station's daily schedule. An evening hour featured a cavalcade of amateur talk radio hosts; most were members of the Wilmington-area community. Weekend programming was almost exclusively all satellite talk by 2004.

In 2004, owner Sally V. Hawkins sold WILM to Clear Channel Communications (now iHeartMedia) for $4 million. On July 28, 2006, WILM dropped the national newscasts from CBS Radio and switched to Fox News Radio. Clear Channel moved WILM into a new broadcast facility shared with its other Delaware stations. The new facility allows automated operation and Clear Channel reduced WILM's local air staff and local programming and added syndicated talk programming including Rush Limbaugh, Sean Hannity and Michael Savage. Both Limbaugh and Hannity had been carried by WDEL during a period when it dominated local ratings in the talk format, although these programs have not received comparable ratings on WILM.

In 2010, Clear Channel dropped WILM's morning news block programming and replaced it with a local talk show hosted by Bruce Elliott, who had previously done a weekend talk show at WBAL in Baltimore. In 2011, about six months after Elliott's arrival, Clear Channel dropped WILM's late morning local talk show hosted by John Watson and replaced it with a syndicated program hosted by Glenn Beck (which Clear Channel distributes). Almost all programs on WILM are simulcast on Clear Channel's WDOV in Dover. WILM, which once boasted about its large local news staff, now carries local news from WDOV. Sunday morning programs on WILM are generally public access shows which include health, real estate, gardening and Italian-American programs.

== Notable alumni ==
- Tom Donahue - Top 40 DJ in Philadelphia and Los Angeles, d. 1975
- Tom Mees - Sports broadcaster, ESPN Radio, d. 1996
- Joe Pyne - Nationally syndicated talk show host, d. 1970
