= WZEB =

Radio station in Ocean View, Delaware

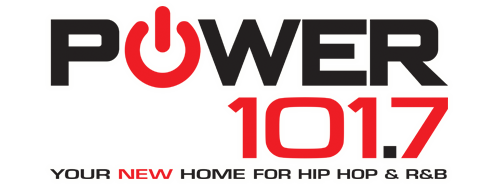
- Ocean View, Delaware; United States
- Broadcast area: Salisbury–Ocean City
- Frequency: 101.7 MHz
- Branding: Power 101.7

Programming
- Language: English
- Format: Rhythmic contemporary

Ownership
- Owner: The Voice Radio Network
- Sister stations: WJKI; WJKI-FM; WJWL; WKDB; WKHI

History
- First air date: May 1985
- Former call signs: WOVU (1985–1989); WRKE (1989–1998); WRBG (1998–2001)

Technical information
- Licensing authority: FCC
- Facility ID: 53993
- Class: A
- ERP: 3,300 watts
- HAAT: 136 meters (446 ft)
- Transmitter coordinates: 38°31′24.4″N 75°17′53.7″W

Links
- Public license information: Public file; LMS
- Webcast: Listen live
- Website: power1017.com

WZEB (101.7 FM) is a commercial radio station broadcasting a contemporary hit radio format. Licensed to Ocean View, Delaware, United States, the station serves the Salisbury-Ocean City market. The station is owned by The Voice Radio Network.

== History ==
The station was originally put on the air around May 1985, as WOVU, licensed to Ocean View, Delaware. The station had an adult contemporary format that stayed on the air until 1989. In 1989, Tony Q. Foxx bought WOVU. The call letters were changed to WRKE and the name was changed to "101.7 Kiss-FM", changing to an urban adult contemporary format with a lean toward soft urban adult contemporary (love songs). Kiss-FM stayed on the air until 1998, when Tony sold the station to Great Scott Broadcasting.

Great Scott Broadcasting, who had also bought WSUX (98.5 FM), put on a classic hits format, known as "BIG-Classic Hits 98.5 & 101.7". The call letters were changed to WRBG to match the name of the station. In April 2001, WRBG was broken off and flipped to "Today's Hit Music B101-7" and the call letters were changed to WZEB. The station was targeted the females 18-49 demographic. Two years later, the station was paired with WKDB to expand its coverage area. On August 25, 2009, GSB ended the simulcast on WKDB, but that station returned to the simulcast in late 2011.

On November 1, 2014, WZEB split from its simulcast with WKDB and changed its format to urban contemporary, branded as "Power 101.7". On February 27, 2020, WZEB changed its format to rhythmic contemporary music, while retaining the "Power 101.7" branding. On September 12, 2025, WZEB changed its format to contemporary hit radio, again retaining the "Power 101.7" branding.
