= Allan Prell =

- Born: September 20, 1937
- Died: December 10, 2016 (aged 79)

Allan V. Prell (September 20, 1937 – December 10, 2016) was a former WBAL talk show host.

== Career ==
He was ranked among “the Heavy Hundred” (top) talk radio hosts from 1999 to 2001 by Talkers Magazine. Talkers Magazine February issue 1999-2000-2001 Prell earned a dedicated audience for his outspoken liberal views and sarcastic debates with callers who disagreed with him. His caustic one-liners and humorous hang ups were considered daring at the time, but are now commonly replicated by more conservative talk show personalities like Mark Levin. Prell is a two-time winner of the Edward R. Murrow Award for Investigative Journalism, as well as numerous awards from the Associated Press. In Reno, he published the muckraking weekly paper, “The Citizen”. He was arrested and briefly jailed for trespassing to photograph the infamous local brothel, The Mustang Bridge Ranch. He was fired from Reno's KOLO after reporting about corruption in local law enforcement. He received his next radio job (1966) in Los Angeles at KLAC based on the personal recommendation of Joe Pyne, after Pyne interviewed Prell about his Reno exploits. Other stations Prell hosted call-in programs on included: WTOP Washington; WEEL Fairfax, VA (also program director), where he hosted the midday Party Line and Date Line call-in shows; WLMD (now WACA) Laurel, MD; WRNG Atlanta; KIRO Seattle; and WBAL Baltimore (where he worked for 17 years). Prell also hosted The Movie Show On Radio, a weekly syndicated program heard in 80 markets. Prell left radio broadcasting in 2005. His character was the inspiration for the call-in parody series, The Papa Prell Show, which aired on college radio stations from 1983 to 1994.

Allan Prell had also authored several books, including Kaching, the Collective Wisdoms of Kaching (1997), Crystal Daze (2010), Meth for Less (2010), Brothers Prell (2011), The Killing of Andrew Mybull (2014)
