= WNWK =

Radio station in Newark, Delaware (1964–2012)

- Newark, Delaware; United States
- Broadcast area: Wilmington, Delaware
- Frequency: 1260 kHz

Ownership
- Owner: José Roberto Ekonomo and Aida Esperanza Ekonomo; (Eko Media Group, Inc.)

History
- First air date: August 18, 1964
- Last air date: March 8, 2012 (license cancellation)
- Call sign meaning: "Newark"

Technical information
- Facility ID: 2646
- Class: D
- Power: 1,000 watts (day); 42 watts (night)
- Transmitter coordinates: 39.6443°N 75.7300°W

WNWK (1260 AM, "Sabrosa 1260") was a radio station broadcasting in Spanish in Newark, Delaware. The station was last owned by Jose Roberto Ekonomo and Aida Esperanza Ekonomo, doing business as Eko Media Group, Inc.

== History ==
=== WNRK ===
In June 1961, the Federal Communications Commission approved the grant of a construction permit to Herman Handloff for a new radio station to serve Newark, Delaware. The station would operate during the daytime only on 1260 kHz. Handloff, however, would not live to build the station; the 50-year-old Newark lawyer and businessman died of a heart ailment in Miami on April 8, 1962. Handloff's death almost derailed plans to build the radio station, but in an unprecedented action, the FCC reversed its rescission of the construction permit in order to allow it to be sold to Radio Newark, Inc. for $67,200. The new owner was headed by J. Gordon Smith and William S. Cook of Dover, who had previously run station WDOV in that city.

Construction of the facilities, located on Walther Road, took place throughout 1964. However, the station missed several announced start dates, including April, May 15, and June; the last delay was caused when the fabricator of a critical antenna component was forced to temporarily take it out of production to handle a top-priority Army contract. At last, WNRK signed on at 6 a.m. on August 18, 1964; a highlight of the first day was an interview with Herman Handloff's widow. WNRK's programming followed a "good music" policy and emphasized local news and information for Newark. It was the 11th radio station in Delaware and the first to be located in Newark. Cook bought WARV in Warwick, Rhode Island, in 1967. A subsidiary of WNRK, Vistavue, wired homes in Newark and western New Castle County for cable television beginning in 1969.

J. Gordon Smith died in a 1971 plane crash; three years later, the Cook family bought out his estate's shares in Radio Newark, which became known as Cook Broadcasting in 1978. Cook raised the station's power to 1,000 watts in 1980. That same year, Al Campagnone, who had been involved in Delaware broadcasting since the early 1960s, was named as the station's news director;

=== Campagnone era ===
In the early 1980s, high interest rates forced Cook Broadcasting into financial trouble, resulting in the station being foreclosed upon in January 1984 by Heller-Oak Communications Finance Corporation of Chicago. Cook had failed to pay a $457,000 loan made by the finance corporation in the late 1970s. Campagnone was appointed the receiver and then bought the station through his ARC Broadcasting company for $500,000. By this time, WNRK aired an adult contemporary format with an emphasis on local news programming. Campagnone turned around the station's finances, and a ratings survey in October 1985 showed that WNRK rated number one in Newark, helped by the station poaching popular DJ Bruce Davis from WDEL in Wilmington. The late 1980s brought WNRK the Baltimore Orioles radio network affiliation for Delaware, as well as an expansion in broadcast hours to midnight; the station also was affiliated with the Motor Racing Network. The station later added Washington Redskins football telecasts and then made headlines when it opted to drop the Redskins for the Dallas Cowboys, making it just one of three East Coast stations to carry their games; the decision brought attention to the station, which paid a measly $800 for the rights and hoped to expand its audience base with the change.

1994 brought WNRK's 30th anniversary, and with it, the station's first-ever format change, from contemporary music to oldies; its hookup with the ABC "Pure Gold" satellite oldies service also meant the station would go 24-hours for the first time. That same year, the station added a 90-minute show on Saturdays in Spanish, the first time a Delaware commercial radio station had a program in the language.

=== Klepac ownership ===
In 2000, Campagnone elected to sell the WNRK tower site to a developer proposing a subdivision of 74 town houses, citing the need to reduce costs amid a consolidating industry. The station went off the air in June, and the six-month silence that followed also marked the end of Campagnone ownership; he retired to California, and Vincent Klepac, owner of gospel station WQVL in Dover doing business as Capitol Broadcasting, bought the license for $140,000. WNRK briefly broadcast from Dover before returning to new studios on Main Street in Newark.

Not long after the sale was finalized, however, the station relaunched completely as WAMS, trading on the heritage of the former WAMS in Wilmington. After reorganizing as East Coast Broadcasting in 2004, the station changed call letters five times in three years, being known as WNWK for one week in February 2004 and WRJJ for less than a month in 2006. Ultimately, the WNWK call letters were put on the station on January 11, 2007.

=== Ekonomo ownership ===
The final transfer of ownership in the 1260 facility's history occurred in 2007, when José Roberto and Aida Esperanza Ekonomo acquired WNWK from East Coast for $200,000. Under Ekonomo ownership, the station broadcast a Regional Mexican format as Sabrosa 1260.

In 2011, the Ekonomos made a deal with Salem Communications to take WNWK off the air so that Salem could improve the signal of WWRC in Washington, D.C., which operates on the same frequency. The station's license was surrendered on March 8, 2012, one day before WWRC began program test authority with its improved signal, per the terms of the Interference Reduction Agreement between Salem and WNWK. The Ekonomos continued to own and operate WRJE in Dover until its license was canceled in November 2015.
