= WBBX (FM) =

- Pocomoke City, Maryland; United States
- Frequency: 106.1 MHz
- Branding: Sunny 106.1 Feel Good 80s and More

Programming
- Format: Adult Contemporary
- Affiliations: Baltimore Ravens Radio Network

Ownership
- Owner: Vince Klepac; (Vinco Media LLC)

History
- First air date: 1992 (as WMYJ)
- Former call signs: WMYJ (1991–1994); WWVV (1994–1995); WKHI (1995–1996); WKHW (1996–2009); WXSH (2009–2020)

Technical information
- Licensing authority: FCC
- Facility ID: 67576
- Class: A
- ERP: 4,000 watts
- HAAT: 104 meters (341 ft)
- Transmitter coordinates: 38°4′36.4″N 75°32′16.7″W

Links
- Public license information: Public file; LMS
- Webcast: Listen live (via iHeartRadio)

WBBX (106.1 MHz) is an FM radio station broadcasting an classic hits format. Licensed to Pocomoke City, Maryland, United States, the station is owned by Vinco Media LLC (Vince Klepac). The station was assigned the WBBX call letters by the Federal Communications Commission on February 6, 2020.

== History ==
The original call sign of the station was WMYJ in 1992. During two months of 1994, the call letters were changed to WWVV in 1994. While the station was licensed to Great Scott Broadcasting, it was operated under a local marketing agreement (LMA) by Bay Broadcasting. Prior to 2005, the station was a simulcast of WBEY, a country music station.

In 2005, the simulcast ended and the station switched its programming to SAM-FM, a variety hits programming format distributed by satellite by Westwood One.

In August 2007, WKHW dropped the format and the SAM-FM programming. The station overlapped Great Scott's own programming on WKHI (107.7 FM) which had a similar variety hits format serving the same geographic area.

The station then became known as "K-Rock", broadcasting a classic rock format.

=== Silent ===
In Summer 2008, Bay Broadcasting's LMA with Great Scott Broadcasting ended in a dispute and the station went silent on June 23, 2008. WKHW was granted permission by the Federal Communications Commission (FCC) to temporarily shut off its transmitter. Granted on August 21, 2008, this "remain silent" authority was to expire on February 17, 2009. The broadcast license for this station would automatically expire as a matter of law if the station did not resume broadcast operations by 12:01 a.m. on June 24, 2009. On April 13, 2009, while the station remained silent, the call sign was changed to WXSH.

=== Studio 106 ===
On June 22, 2009, WXSH returned to the air at 106.1 FM with a rhythmic oldies format branded as "Studio 106". On August 25, 2009, GSB started a simulcast with WKDB out of Laurel, Delaware. On August 4, 2010, the station went dark again.

=== Máxima 106.1 FM ===
On October 29, 2011, WXSH became Máxima 106.1 FM, a Spanish-language radio station managed by Hola Media Network. This station simulcast WJWL, Máxima 900.

=== The Vault ===
On November 3, 2014, WXSH changed its format to classic rock, branded as "The Vault" and simulcasting WJKI-FM 103.5 from Bethany Beach, Delaware.

=== Xtra 106.1 ===
With the sale of WXSH pending FCC approval, the station went dark for several weeks in early December 2018. On December 17, 2018, the new Xtra 106.1 was launched, playing "Delmarva's Greatest Hits of All Time".

=== 94.9KHI simulcast ===
On May 1, 2019, WXSH dropped "Delmarva's Greatest Hits of All Time", and started simulcasting WKHI (94.9 FM).

=== Xtra 106.1 reboot ===
On June 7, 2019, WXSH dropped the WKHI simulcast and relaunched Xtra 106.1.

=== B106.1 ===
On February 6, 2020, WXSH rebranded as "B106.1" under new WBBX call letters.

On July 1, 2024, the station rebranded as Delmarva Gold B 106.1 playing an oldies format.
