= WJWL =

- Georgetown, Delaware; United States
- Broadcast area: Delmarva Peninsula
- Frequency: 900 kHz
- Branding: La Raza

Programming
- Language: Spanish
- Format: Regional Mexican

Ownership
- Owner: Edwin Andrade; (The Voice Radio, LLC)
- Sister stations: WJKI; WJKI-FM; WKDB; WKHI; WZEB

History
- First air date: June 23, 1951
- Former call signs: WJWL (1951–1987); WSEA (1987–1991); WSSR (1991–1998)

Technical information
- Licensing authority: FCC
- Facility ID: 25007
- Class: D
- Power: 1,000 watts (day); 145 watts (night)
- Transmitter coordinates: 38°42′26.4″N 75°24′17.7″W
- Translators: 93.1 W226CW (Georgetown); 106.7 W294CH (Georgetown)

Links
- Public license information: Public file; LMS
- Webcast: Listen live
- Website: holamusica.com/station-wjwl/

WJWL (900 kHz) is a AM radio station licensed to serve Georgetown, Delaware. The station airs a Regional Mexican format known as "La Raza". The studios and AM transmitter are located on U.S. Route 113 northwest of Georgetown. The station is repeated by two FM translators, covering Georgetown and Laurel.

== History ==
=== Early years ===
On December 13, 1950, Rollins Broadcasting received a construction permit from the Federal Communications Commission (FCC) for a new daytime-only radio station on 900 kHz in Georgetown. The station signed on June 23, 1951, the first in Sussex County and an independent outlet. Soon after the station launched, in October 1952, John W. Rollins, co-owner of Rollins Broadcasting with his brother O. Wayne and Lieutenant Governor of Delaware from 1953 to 1957, announced plans to file for a television station on channel 40, which would have been the first on the Lower Peninsula. The station was never opened, but Rollins continued to expand its Delaware media holdings with the 1954 acquisition of WAMS (1380 AM) in Wilmington.

However, Rollins wanted to reach a larger market. After its attempt to increase power from 1,000 to 5,000 watts was dismissed in 1954, Rollins filed to move WJWL from Georgetown to Philadelphia, if it could get a new frequency in Georgetown, 1250 kHz, which would use the station's present equipment. In July 1955, the application was changed to be that of a new station for Philadelphia, though another applicant was awarded the frequency in 1957.

=== Scott ownership ===
Rollins sold WJWL to Herbert Scott and his Scott Broadcasting in 1960 for $400,000. Herbert Scott continued to own and manage WJWL, airing a middle-of-the-road music format, and its FM counterpart WSEA (93.5 FM), which he had put on air in July 1969; he had become the largest individual owner of radio stations in the United States by the time he died in 1984 of a heart attack. Ed Marzoa, who had been the founding station manager in 1951 and had hosted a talk show, Hot Line, since 1967, was forced out in 1979. The station had adopted a country music format by 1983.

The call letters were changed from WJWL to WSEA on September 3, 1987—by which time the station aired an adult standards format—and again to WSSR on January 18, 1991. Adult standards gave way to news/talk in 1997. The change, however, lasted less than a year, and the station reverted to adult standards in early 1998, at the same time reclaiming its heritage WJWL call letters.

=== Spanish and two sales ===
WJWL would change from standards to Spanish-language programming in 2010, becoming Spanish contemporary hit radio station "Máxima", simulcast on WXSH (106.1 FM). The Máxima programming was produced by Hola Media Network, Inc., under a local marketing agreement (LMA) with Great Scott Broadcasting.

The death of Mitch Scott in 2013, after a battle with leukemia, was the catalyst for the end of Great Scott's operations on Delmarva. Sale preparations began in September 2013. The stations were split up between Adams Radio Group and The Voice Radio Network the next year, with The Voice slated to buy WJWL. After the deal, an apparent major problem soon emerged that threatened the entire transaction, as Hola Media Network, the LMA operator of WJWL, claimed it had first right of refusal to buy the station. Great Scott claimed it did not know about any such right, given that the late Mitch Scott had negotiated the programming agreement. The protest, also dismissed by the FCC, was highly unusual, as Edwin "Kevin" Andrade was the head of Hola and The Voice Radio Network. After a settlement was reached in the deal in March 2015, Adams Radio Group CEO Ron Stone called the purchase of the Scott Delmarva cluster "the longest deal in my lifetime". The Voice continued to operate WJWL as Máxima—now being simulcast with WKDB (95.3 FM)—and in 2015, Adams sold the station and its accompanying FM translator to The Voice for $60,000.

After the sale, WJWL became a separate station, airing a Regional Mexican format known as La Raza. However, it also lost much of its power. As part of a dismantling of its tower, the former 10,500-watt station reduced power; on February 12, 2016, WJWL was granted an FCC construction permit to move to a nearby transmitter site, downgrade from Class B to Class D, decrease day power to 1,000 watts and decrease night power to 145 watts.

== Translators ==
Call sign	Frequency	City of license	FID	ERP (W)	HAAT	Class	Transmitter coordinates	FCC info
W226CW	(93.1 MHz) FM	Georgetown, Delaware	151579	250	55 m (180 ft)	D	38°37′34.0″N 75°14′01.0″W	LMS
W294CH	(106.7 MHz) FM	Georgetown, Delaware	200516	250	75 m (246 ft)	D	38°30′12.4″N 75°39′38.7″W	LMS
