= John Sandusky =

American football player and coach (1925–2006)

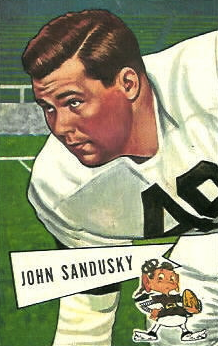
- Sandusky on a 1952 football card

No. 49, 78, 77
- Position: Tackle

Personal information
- Born: December 28, 1925; Philadelphia, Pennsylvania, U.S.
- Died: March 5, 2006 (aged 80); Coral Springs, Florida, U.S.
- Listed height: 6 ft 1 in (1.85 m)
- Listed weight: 251 lb (114 kg)

Career information
- High school: South Philadelphia
- College: Villanova (1946–1949)
- NFL draft: 1950: 2nd round, 18th overall pick

Career history

Playing
- Cleveland Browns (1950–1955); Green Bay Packers (1956)

Coaching
- Villanova (1957–1958) Assistant coach; Baltimore Colts (1959–1972) Offensive/defensive line coach; Baltimore Colts (1972) Head coach; Philadelphia Eagles (1973–1975) Offensive line coach; Miami Dolphins (1976–1994) Offensive line coach

Awards and highlights
- As player: 3× NFL champion (1950, 1954, 1955); First-team All-American (1949); As coach: Super Bowl champion (V); 2× NFL champion (1959, 1968)

Career NFL statistics
- Games played: 82
- Games started: 59
- Fumble recoveries: 10
- Stats at Pro Football Reference

Head coaching record
- Career: NFL: 4–5 (.444)
- Coaching profile at Pro Football Reference

John Thomas "Sandy" Sandusky Jr. (December 28, 1925 – March 5, 2006) was an American professional football player and coach. He played seven seasons as an offensive and defensive tackle in the National Football League (NFL) during the 1950s for the Cleveland Browns and the Green Bay Packers before starting a 36-year career as an assistant coach. He was head coach of the Baltimore Colts for part of the 1972 season.

Sandusky grew up in Philadelphia and attended the nearby Villanova University. He played tackle on Villanova's football team and was named a first-team All-American in 1949, his senior year. The Browns selected him in the second round of the 1950 NFL draft. Sandusky played six seasons for the Browns, who won NFL championships in 1950, 1954 and 1955 behind an offense that featured quarterback Otto Graham and end Dante Lavelli. He spent the 1956 season with the Packers before ending his playing career.

Sandusky started coaching at Villanova for two years before being hired as an assistant with the Baltimore Colts in 1959. He spent 13 seasons in Baltimore overseeing the offensive and defensive lines under head coaches Weeb Ewbank, Don Shula and Don McCafferty. Led by quarterback Johnny Unitas, the Colts won an NFL championship in 1959 and beat the Dallas Cowboys to win Super Bowl V in 1970. When McCafferty was fired midway through the 1972 season, Sandusky replaced him as head coach. Sandusky himself was fired after the season, however, and went on to spend three years as an assistant for the Philadelphia Eagles, followed by 19 seasons with the Miami Dolphins under Shula. His son Gerry is a radio broadcaster in Baltimore and calls Baltimore Ravens games.

== Early life and college ==
Sandusky, who was of Polish and Irish heritage, grew up in South Philadelphia and attended South Philadelphia High School. After graduating in 1945, and serving his country in World War II, he enrolled at Villanova University outside of Philadelphia, where he was a starting tackle for four years. Villanova had winning records in each year Sandusky played there between 1946 and 1949 under head coaches Jordan Olivar and Jim Leonard. The team won the Harbor Bowl after the 1948 season. Sandusky was named a first-team All-American by the New York Sun in 1949, his senior year.

== Professional career ==
The Cleveland Browns of the National Football League (NFL) selected Sandusky 18th overall in the second round of the 1950 draft. He played mostly as a defensive tackle early in his career, but also worked on offense following the retirement of Lou Rymkus in 1952. Led by a strong defense and an offense that featured quarterback Otto Graham and end Dante Lavelli, the Browns advanced to the NFL championship in each of Sandusky's six seasons with the team. The team beat the Los Angeles Rams to win the championship in 1950, but lost the ensuing three championship games to the Rams and twice to the Detroit Lions. Cleveland beat the Lions to win the title in 1954, however, and won it again in 1955 over the Rams.

Cleveland coach Paul Brown traded Sandusky along with halfback Chet Lyssy to the Green Bay Packers in August 1956 for a late-round draft pick in 1957. While Brown called Sandusky a "fine football player", the coach wanted to replenish the roster with younger players. Sandusky played one year for the Packers before leaving football.

== Coaching career ==
After retiring as a player, Sandusky began a long coaching career. His first job was as an assistant at his alma mater Villanova in 1957. He stayed there until 1959, when he was hired by Baltimore Colts head coach Weeb Ewbank, who had been an assistant with the Browns when Sandusky played in Cleveland. He was initially the defensive line coach for the Colts, who finished Sandusky's first season with a 9–3 win–loss record and won the NFL West behind an offense led by quarterback Johnny Unitas and halfback Lenny Moore. The Colts went on to win the NFL championship over the New York Giants.

The Colts fired Ewbank in early 1963 and replaced him with Don Shula, who had been an assistant with the Detroit Lions and played with Sandusky in Cleveland in 1951 and 1952. Shula retained Sandusky on his staff when he took over, and the Colts went on to win the NFL West with a 12–2 record in 1964. The team was heavily favored to win the NFL championship game, but lost to the Browns by a 27–0 score. By 1965, Sandusky was the Colts' offensive line coach as the team continued to succeed with Unitas at quarterback. The Colts won the NFL Championship in 1968, but lost to the AFL Champion New York Jets in Super Bowl III.

Sandusky stayed on as an assistant when Shula left after the 1969 season and was replaced by Don McCafferty. The Colts finished with an 11–2–1 win–loss–tie record in 1970 and beat the Dallas Cowboys to win Super Bowl V. The team reached the conference championship game the following year, but faltered at the beginning of the 1972 season. After starting with a 1–4 record, Baltimore general manager Joe Thomas fired McCafferty in October, saying the team was going to replenish its roster with younger players. The move was one of Thomas's first after new Colts owner Robert Irsay hired him at the beginning of the season. Thomas named Sandusky the team's new coach and charged him with replenishing the roster. At Thomas's urging, Sandusky immediately benched Unitas and replaced him with Marty Domres, a quarterback acquired from the San Diego Chargers in a preseason trade. While Unitas was in his 17th season and reaching the end of his career, taking him out was a controversial decision because of the success he had.

Sandusky's run as head coach of the Colts was unsuccessful. Baltimore suffered a last-minute loss to the New York Jets in Sandusky's first game, followed by another loss to the Miami Dolphins. The Colts won four of their next five games, however, and finished the season with a 5–9 record. Although Sandusky managed a 4–5 win–loss record as coach, Thomas fired him and his coaching staff immediately after the season, saying he made the move only "because I thought it should be done."

When Mike McCormack was hired as head coach of the Philadelphia Eagles in early 1973, he brought Sandusky in as an offensive assistant. Sandusky spent three years under McCormack, who had played with Sandusky as an offensive tackle for the Browns in 1954 and 1955.

Sandusky rejoined Shula in 1976, becoming the offensive line coach for the Dolphins. He replaced Monte Clark, who had left the team to become head coach of the San Francisco 49ers. He stayed with the Dolphins for 19 seasons through 1994, all of them under Shula. The Dolphins advanced to the Super Bowl twice during Sandusky's tenure with the team, in 1982 and 1984, but lost both times. He was offered a job as director of pro personnel for the Colts before the team moved to Indianapolis in 1984, but he declined it, saying he wanted to stay near his family in Florida.

Sandusky coached a number of linemen later inducted into the Pro Football Hall of Fame during his 36-season coaching career, including Art Donovan, Gino Marchetti and Jim Parker with the Colts and Jim Langer and Dwight Stephenson with the Dolphins.

== Later life and death ==
Sandusky was inducted into the South Philadelphia High School Hall of Fame in 1973. Sandusky's son Joe died in 1978 of pneumonia, and his wife Ruth died in 1985. Sandusky was married to his second wife, Shirley, until he died of complications from Alzheimer's disease, which was diagnosed in 2001, and internal bleeding while hospitalized in 2006. He had four living children at the time of his death and four Step-children. One of his sons, Gerry Sandusky, is the sports director at WBAL-TV in Baltimore and calls Baltimore Ravens games. Sandusky was considered a talented assistant. Long-time New York Giants general manager Ernie Accorsi once called him "the greatest coach in the history of the league that never got a chance".
