= WDSD =

- Dover, Delaware; United States
- Broadcast area: Dover, Delaware
- Frequency: 94.7 MHz (HD Radio)
- Branding: 94-7 WDSD

Programming
- Format: Country
- Subchannels: HD2: Simulcast of WILM (talk)
- Affiliations: Delaware Fightin' Blue Hens; Motor Racing Network

Ownership
- Owner: iHeartMedia, Inc.; (iHM Licenses, LLC)
- Sister stations: WILM (AM), WDOV, WRDX, WWTX

History
- First air date: 1956; 70 years ago
- Former call signs: WDOV-FM (1956–1970); WDSD (1970–1997); WRDX (1997–2007)

Technical information
- Licensing authority: FCC
- Facility ID: 4669
- Class: B
- ERP: 50,000 watts (analog); 500 watts (digital)
- HAAT: 115 meters (377 ft)
- Transmitter coordinates: 39°12′3.4″N 75°33′53.7″W

Links
- Public license information: Public file; LMS
- Webcast: Listen live (via iHeartRadio)
- Website: wdsd.iheart.com

WDSD (94.7 FM) is a commercial radio station licensed to serve Dover, Delaware. The station is owned by iHeartMedia, Inc. and broadcasts a country format.

WDSD broadcasts some sporting events, including NASCAR races, and is the flagship station for University of Delaware athletics. Some UD events are broadcast on sister station Fox Sports 1290 in Wilmington.

Logo under former slogan

The station has been assigned the WDSD call sign by the Federal Communications Commission since September 7, 2007, when it swapped call signs with sister station WRDX.

WDSD uses HD Radio.
