= WJKI (AM) =

Simulcasts WJKI-FM, Bethany Beach, Delaware
- Salisbury, Maryland; United States
- Broadcast area: Delaware: Laurel; Seaford; Maryland: Pocomoke City; Princess Anne; Salisbury; Snow Hill
- Frequency: 1320 kHz
- Branding: 103.5 & 102.9 The Vault

Programming
- Format: Mainstream rock
- Affiliations: Compass Media Networks; Westwood One

Ownership
- Owner: Edwin G. Andrade; (The Voice Radio, LLC)
- Sister stations: WJKI-FM; WJWL; WKDB; WKHI; WZEB

History
- First air date: 1957
- Former call signs: WSMD (1956); WICO (1956–2018)

Technical information
- Licensing authority: FCC
- Facility ID: 53485
- Class: D
- Power: 1,000 watts (day); 28 watts (night)
- Transmitter coordinates: 38°21′39.4″N 75°36′58.7″W
- Translator: See § Translators

Links
- Public license information: Public file; LMS
- Webcast: Listen live
- Website: www.thevaultrocks.com

WJKI (1320 kHz) is a AM radio station broadcasting a mainstream rock format. Licensed to Salisbury, Maryland, United States, the station is owned by Edwin G. Andrade, through licensee The Voice Radio, LLC, and features programming from Compass Media Networks and Westwood One.

On November 21, 2018, the then-WICO changed their format from regional Mexican to a simulcast of classic rock-formatted WJKI-FM 103.5 from Bethany Beach, Delaware, branded as "The Vault". The station changed its call sign to WJKI on November 30, 2018.

Previous logo

== Translators ==
Broadcast translators for WJKI
Call sign	Frequency	City of license	FID	ERP (W)	HAAT	Class	Transmitter coordinates	FCC info
W238BY	95.5 FM	Crisfield, Maryland	154039	50	82.3 m (270 ft)	D	38°4′36.4″N 75°32′16.7″W	LMS
W275CX	102.9 FM	Salisbury, Maryland	202562	250	81 m (266 ft)	D	38°21′39.4″N 75°36′58.7″W	LMS
