= WRDX =

- Smyrna, Delaware; United States
- Broadcast area: New Castle County; Kent County; Northern Delaware Beaches
- Frequency: 92.9 MHz (HD Radio)
- Branding: 92.9 TOM FM

Programming
- Format: Adult contemporary
- Subchannels: HD2: WWTX simulcast (Sports)

Ownership
- Owner: iHeartMedia, Inc.; (iHM Licenses, LLC)
- Sister stations: WILM (AM), WDOV, WDSD, WWTX

History
- First air date: 1993; 33 years ago (as WYHH)
- Former call signs: WYHH (1991–1994); WSRV (1994–1997); WDSD (1997–2007)

Technical information
- Licensing authority: FCC
- Facility ID: 4676
- Class: A
- ERP: 1,700 watts (analog); 17 watts (digital)
- HAAT: 115 meters (377 ft)
- Transmitter coordinates: 39°12′3″N 75°33′55″W

Links
- Public license information: Public file; LMS
- Webcast: Listen Live; Listen Live (HD2)
- Website: 929tomfm.iheart.com

WRDX (92.9 FM) is a radio station licensed to serve Smyrna, Delaware. It is owned by iHeartMedia, Inc., and airs an adult contemporary format.

The station was assigned its call letters by the Federal Communications Commission on September 7, 2007, when it swapped with sister station WDSD.

== Format flips ==
On October 21, 2008, WRDX dropped its hot adult contemporary format as "The River" for adult hits as "Tom FM".

On March 1, 2014, WRDX changed their format back to hot adult contemporary, still under the "Tom FM" branding.

On September 3, 2014, WRDX rebranded as "Mix 92.9".

On July 1, 2016, WRDX changed their format to Hot AC, branded as "92.9 Tom FM".

On either November 6 or November 7, 2020, WRDX changed its format from Hot AC to Christmas music still branded as "Tom FM", but changed its slogan to, "Delaware's Christmas Station". The format change happened on November 5, 2021, November 11, 2022, November 10, 2023, November 8, 2024, November 7, 2025 and November 6, 2026 and it usually ends on December 26 at midnight but on 2023 it lasted longer until January 2, 2024 at midnight, and on 2025 it lasted a bit longer until December 29, 2025 at midnight.
