= WUSX =

Simulcasting WGMD, Rehoboth Beach
- Seaford, Delaware; United States
- Broadcast area: Salisbury-Ocean City
- Frequency: 98.5 MHz

Programming
- Format: Talk
- Affiliations: Fox News Radio; AccuWeather; Genesis Communications Network; Salem Radio Network; USA Radio Network; Westwood One; Baltimore Orioles Radio Network; Baltimore Ravens Radio Network; Motor Racing Network; Philadelphia Phillies Radio Network

Ownership
- Owner: Mark Giuliani; (Datatech Digital LLC)
- Sister stations: WGMD

History
- First air date: 1972 (as WSUX-FM at 98.3)
- Former call signs: WSUX-FM (1972–1991); WECY-FM (1991–1995); WSUX (1995–1998); WGBG (1998–2016); WGBG-FM (2016–2018); WKHI (2018)
- Former frequencies: 98.3 MHz (1972–1998)

Technical information
- Licensing authority: FCC
- Facility ID: 4340
- Class: A
- ERP: 6,000 watts
- HAAT: 98 meters
- Transmitter coordinates: 38°36′47.4″N 75°35′10.7″W

Links
- Public license information: Public file; LMS
- Webcast: Listen live
- Website: www.wgmd.com

WUSX (98.5 FM) is an American radio station licensed to Seaford, Delaware, and serving Salisbury, Maryland, Ocean City, Maryland, Southern Delaware, Virginia, and the rest of Delmarva, with studios and cluster offices located in Salisbury. Its tower is located in Seaford. WUSX simulcasts a talk radio format with WGMD (92.7 FM) in Rehoboth Beach, Delaware.

== History ==
WSUX-FM 98.3 signed on the air in February 1972, carrying the programming of WSUX (1280 AM).

Previous studios were located along U.S. Route 13 in Seaford, Delaware. The station originally transmitted at 98.3 FM before moving to 98.5 FM in 1998. Previous formats included an easy listening format with call signs WSUX-FM (Sussex County) and WECY-FM (Easy).

On August 17, 2018, the station's WGBG-FM call sign and classic rock format moved from 98.5 FM to WKHI (107.7 FM) in Fruitland, Maryland, and 98.5 continued to simulcast 107.7 under a new WKHI call sign, until a new format was announced. The station changed its call sign again on August 24, 2018, to WUSX.

On September 17, 2018, WUSX split from its simulcast with WGBG-FM and began stunting towards a new format to launch on September 21, 2018, at 5 pm. On September 21, 2018 at 5 p.m., WUSX flipped to a gold-based country music format, branded as "US 98.5".

On November 30, 2021, WUSX was purchased by Mark Giuliani's Datatech Digital, LLC and changed format on December 1 from country to a simulcast of talk-formatted WGMD from Rehoboth Beach, Delaware.

== Former personalities ==
- Dave Fleetwood (1970s, now afternoons at WVLT/Vineland, New Jersey)
- Allan Frazier (1972–1980)
- Bob Mathers
- Dave Jackson (David Pinson)

== Transmitter ==
The transmitter is a class A transmitter, 6,000 watts, HAAT 98 meters, located in Seaford, Delaware. Facility ID 4340. Located on coordinates 38°36′47″N 75°35′12″W
