= WKHI (FM) =

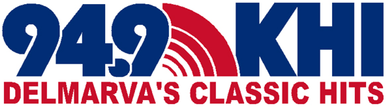
- Newark, Maryland; United States
- Broadcast area: Delmarva
- Frequency: 94.5 MHz
- Branding: 94.5 KHI

Programming
- Format: Classic hits
- Affiliations: Compass Media Networks; Westwood One

Ownership
- Owner: The Voice Radio Network; (The Voice Radio Network, LLC)
- Sister stations: WJKI; WJKI-FM; WJWL; WKDB; WZEB

History
- First air date: April 1, 2017 (as WAMS on 94.9 MHz)
- Former call signs: WMDS (2015–2016); WAMS (2016–2018)
- Former frequencies: 94.9 MHz (2017–2022)

Technical information
- Licensing authority: FCC
- Facility ID: 198742
- Class: A
- ERP: 4,700 watts
- HAAT: 113 meters (371 ft)
- Transmitter coordinates: 38°21′41.4″N 75°15′8.7″W

Links
- Public license information: Public file; LMS
- Webcast: Listen live
- Website: 945khi.com

WKHI (94.5 FM, "94.5 KHI") is a commercial radio station that is licensed to Newark, Maryland, United States, and serves the Delmarva Peninsula. The station is owned by The Voice Radio Network and broadcasts a classic hits format.

== History ==
The station was granted an initial construction permit for 94.9 FM in November 2015. Originally called WMDS, it switched its call sign to WAMS in May 2016. On April 1, 2017, the station signed on the air with a triple-A format as "94.9 WAMS", programmed under a Local marketing agreement between Miriam Media and Robin Rothschild. In October 2017, Seaford Media, LLC (now Vinco Media, LLC) purchased WAMS from Miriam Media; the new owner flipped the station to adult hits as "94.9 Jack FM" on November 1, moving that format from WSUX-FM.

On September 19, 2018, WAMS adopted the legacy WKHI call letters that were used previously at 99.9 FM (now WWFG) when it was a contemporary hit radio (CHR) station. On January 30, 2019, the station flipped to classic hits as "94.9 KHI". From May 1 to June 7, 2019, WKHI was simulcast on WXSH (106.1 FM).

In January 2020, WKHI was sold to The Voice Radio Network. The following month, the station relaunched its classic hits format with the new tagline "Delmarva's Super Hits", focusing on classic hits from the 1980s and 1990s. Promotion for the relaunch included former personalities of the 1990s CHR incarnation of WKHI.

In July 2022, WKHI changed frequencies to 94.5 FM.

Syndicated programming on WKHI includes Backtrax USA — the 1980s version on Saturdays and 1990s on Sundays.
