= Gerry Sandusky =

American sports broadcaster (born 1961)

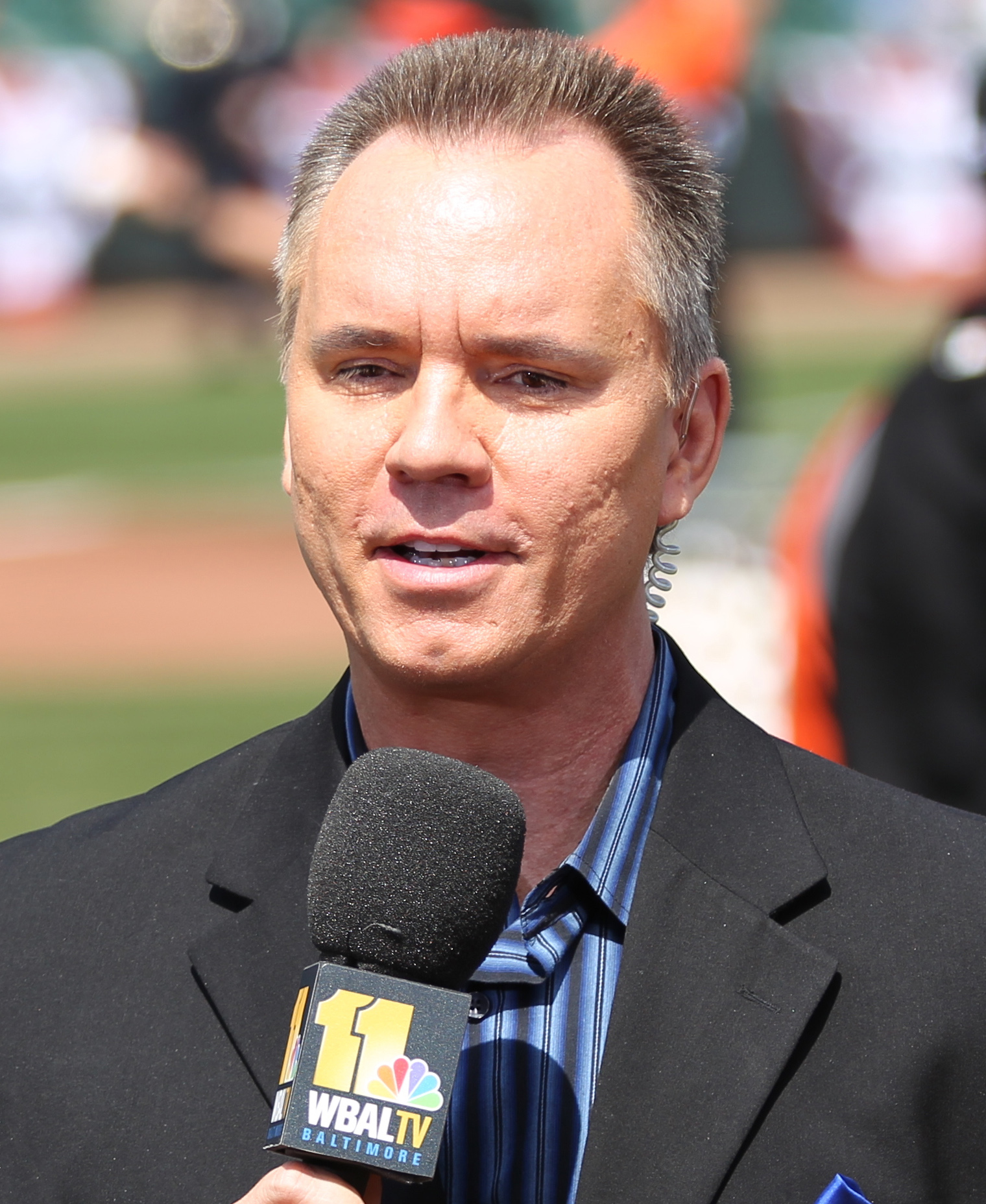
- Sandusky at Oriole Park at Camden Yards, 2012
- Born: Gerard Edward Sandusky; September 5, 1961 (age 65); Baltimore, Maryland
- Sports commentary career
- Genre: Play-by-play
- Sports: National Football League, basketball

Gerard Edward Sandusky (born September 5, 1961) is an American retired sports broadcaster. He worked as the sports director at WBAL-TV in Baltimore, Maryland, and did radio play-by-play for the Baltimore Ravens of the National Football League.

== Early life ==
Sandusky is the son of John Sandusky, who played in the NFL for the Cleveland Browns and Green Bay Packers, and who later was an assistant coach for several NFL teams, and head coach for the Baltimore Colts.

He is a 1983 graduate of Towson University, where he played football and basketball.

== Career ==
Sandusky began his career as a sportscaster for WSVN-TV in Miami, Florida. He joined WBAL-TV in 1988.

In addition to his duties with the Ravens, Sandusky broadcasts Towson University basketball games. Previously, he hosted the pre-game show for Baltimore Orioles broadcasts.

Sandusky is also the owner of The Sandusky Group, a media and communications consulting firm. He and his wife Lee Ann founded the Joe Sandusky Fund, which operates through the Baltimore Community Foundation and raises money for scholarships to financially needy youngsters in the Baltimore area. The fund is named after Sandusky's late brother, a football player at the University of Tulsa, who died of septic shock caused by pneumonia in 1978 at the age of 19.

His most noted catchphrase is "The hay's in the barn" which he uses whenever the Ravens secure a victory. His explanation of its origin:

The phrase comes from my college football coach Phil Albert. In the early 80's I played tight end on Towson University's team. I use the word "play" lightly since I didn't play in games very often. Near the end of each practice, Coach Albert would say, "The hay's in the barn." He meant all the hard work was done and all we had to do was finish up. Ironically, the only time I ever got into games was when the hay was in the barn.

In 2014, Gerry Sandusky authored his first book, Forgotten Sundays: A Son's Story of Love, Loss and Life from the Sidelines of the NFL. With a foreword by Baltimore Ravens Head Coach John Harbaugh, Forgotten Sundays is Gerry Sandusky's coming-of-age story about a son's relationship with his father. It is his story of love, loss, acceptance and living in the shadow of the NFL. On May 24, 2014, Sandusky introduced the book at a public book signing event at Greetings & Readings of Hunt Valley in Baltimore County.

He is not related to former Penn State assistant football coach and convicted child molester Jerry Sandusky.

On July 25, 2018, he appeared on The Daily Show as one of the guests in a segment about people who get harassing tweets because they have a similar name to someone infamous and get mistaken for this person.

On April 1, 2026, he announced he would retire to spend more time with his family.
