= WXHL-FM =

Radio station in Christiana, Delaware

- Christiana, Delaware; United States
- Broadcast area: Wilmington metropolitan area
- Frequency: 89.1 MHz
- Branding: Reach Gospel Radio

Programming
- Format: Urban gospel

Ownership
- Owner: Priority Radio, Inc.

History
- Former call signs: WXHL (1992–2002)

Technical information
- Licensing authority: FCC
- Facility ID: 73763
- Class: A
- ERP: 1,200 watts (vertical polarization); 1 watt (horizontal polarization)
- HAAT: 20 meters (66 ft)
- Transmitter coordinates: 39°40′38″N 75°39′47″W
- Translator: See § Translators
- Repeater: See § Full-powered stations

Links
- Public license information: Public file; LMS
- Webcast: Listen Live
- Website: reachgospelradio.com

WXHL-FM (89.1 MHz) is a non-commercial radio station licensed to Christiana, Delaware, and serving the Wilmington metropolitan area. It has an urban gospel radio format with some Christian talk and teaching programs and is owned by Priority Radio, Inc. It is part of the Reach Gospel Radio Network.

== History ==
The station was assigned the call letters WXHL on November 5, 1992. On February 15, 2002, the station changed its call sign to the current WXHL-FM.

On September 22, 2017, owner Priority Radio flipped its network of stations and translators from Christian AC "Reach FM" to urban gospel "Reach Gospel Radio".

== Other stations ==
In addition to the main station, WXHL-FM is relayed by 11 FM translators, two Class A FM stations (88.3 MHz WVBH in Beach Haven West, New Jersey and 91.9 MHz WXHM in Middletown, Delaware), and one AM station (1550 AM WSRY in Elkton, Maryland).

=== Full-powered stations ===
Call sign	Frequency	City of license	State	FID	Class	Power (W)	ERP (W)	FCC info
WXHM	91.9 FM	Middletown	Delaware	172314	A	—	280	LMS
WSRY	1550 AM	Elkton	Maryland	21621	D	1,000 (day); 1 (night)	—	LMS
WVBH	88.3 FM	Beach Haven West	New Jersey	89740	A	—	100	LMS

=== Translators ===
Call sign	Frequency	City of license	FID	ERP (W)	Class	FCC info
W294BN	106.7 FM	Dover, Delaware	37037	55	D	LMS
W265BG	100.9 FM	Elkton, Maryland	141390	250	D	LMS
W220CT	91.9 FM	Salisbury, Maryland	93022	20	D	LMS
W276CW	103.1 FM	Atlantic City, New Jersey	141366	19	D	LMS
W246AQ	97.1 FM	Collingswood, New Jersey	84808	10	D	LMS
W237CD	95.3 FM	Harrisonville, New Jersey	141376	80	D	LMS
W201BE	88.1 FM	Buffalo, New York	76995	38	D	LMS
W206BZ	89.1 FM	Lockport, New York	90134	27	D	LMS
W278AK	103.5 FM	Village Green-Green Ridge, Pennsylvania	85656	80	D	LMS
W206BY	89.1 FM	Sumter, South Carolina	92612	13	D	LMS
