= WDOV =

Radio station in Dover, Delaware

- Dover, Delaware; United States
- Frequency: 1410 kHz
- Branding: NewsRadio 1410 WDOV

Programming
- Format: News/Talk
- Affiliations: Fox News Radio; Premiere Networks; Compass Media Networks

Ownership
- Owner: iHeartMedia, Inc.; (iHM Licenses, LLC)
- Sister stations: WDSD, WILM (AM), WRDX, WWTX, WUSL, WIOQ, WRFF, WDAS-FM, WUMR, WDAS (AM), WZFT, WCAO, WQSR, WPOC

History
- First air date: June 25, 1948; 77 years ago
- Call sign meaning: "Dover"

Technical information
- Licensing authority: FCC
- Facility ID: 4670
- Class: B
- Power: 5,000 watts
- Transmitter coordinates: 39°12′3″N 75°33′55″W

Links
- Public license information: Public file; LMS
- Webcast: Listen Live
- Website: wdov.iheart.com

WDOV (1410 AM) is a radio station broadcasting a news/talk format. Programming is heard on W286BS 105.1 FM in Milford. Licensed to Dover, Delaware, United States, the station serves the Dover area. The station is currently owned by iHeartMedia, Inc. and features programming from Fox News Radio, Premiere Networks, and Compass Media Networks.

former logo

== History ==
William Courtney Evans received the construction permit to build a new radio station to broadcast during the day with 1,000 watts on 1410 kHz in Dover on November 28, 1947. The station was to have gone on the air June 24, 1948, only for a boiler to fail and cut power to all of the city of Dover. WDOV made it on the air the next day at 6 a.m., only to lose power several hours later before the electrical supply returned to normal that night. Evans sold WDOV to the Delaware State Capital Broadcasting Corporation in 1950. Six years later, the station was sold to the Dover Broadcasting Company, which had been formed by two men who already owned WOL in Washington, D.C.

In 1961, Hurricane Esther passed east of Delaware. WDOV, still a daytime-only station, stayed on the air at night on the evening of September 19 to broadcast emergency information—and commercials. That violation was one of several cited when the Federal Communications Commission ordered Dover Broadcasting to show cause why its licenses for WDOV and WDOV-FM should not be revoked in June 1962. The notice of hearing was unusual for the FCC of the time in that it allowed the commission to consider a fine in lieu of revocation. WDOV pleaded for a fine to be assessed instead of revocation, noting its position in a small market, poor financial condition and the negative reputation that the station's legal troubles had brought; ultimately, the FCC opted to levy a $5,000 fine. WDOV was approved in 1964 to increase its power to 5,000 watts and begin nighttime broadcasting at that power level, which it did in 1965.

Henry Rau, who had founded Dover Broadcasting and came to own 12 radio stations, died in January 1981. WDOV, by this time settled into a full-service adult contemporary format, and the sister FM—now WDSD—were sold to Joel Hartstone and Barry Dickstein of Hartford, Connecticut, in 1983 when the Rau Stations group opted to sell all of its properties.

Benchmark Communications, an owner of cable television franchises with 40,000 customers, acquired WDOV and WDSD as its first radio properties in January 1990. Under Benchmark, WDOV dropped its musical programming of adult standards and moved to news/talk in 1992. By the time Benchmark sold itself to Capstar Broadcasting Partners, a forerunner to iHeartMedia, in 1997, it owned 32 stations in the Southeast and Mid-Atlantic.

In 2015, WDOV and WILM began airing a morning show hosted by former Philadelphia television newscaster Larry Mendte.

== Programming ==
WDOV's programming is typical of that of most iHeartMedia, Inc. news talk stations, with Glenn Beck, Rush Limbaugh, Sean Hannity, and Coast to Coast AM.

iHeartMedia holds flagship rights to Delaware Blue Hens athletic events; football and men's basketball are heard on WDSD, while WDOV and WWTX in Wilmington air women's basketball broadcasts.
