= Tom Mees =

American sportscaster

- Tom Mees on the SportsCenter set.
- Born: October 13, 1949; Springfield, Pennsylvania, U.S.
- Died: August 14, 1996 (aged 46); Southington, Connecticut, U.S.
- Resting place: Holy Cross Burial Park and Mausoleum; East Brunswick, New Jersey
- Education: University of Delaware, 1972
- Occupation: Sportscaster
- Spouse: Michelle Mees
- Children: 2 daughters

Thomas E. Mees (October 13, 1949 – August 14, 1996) was an American sportscaster best known for his role in hosting and in the play-by-play role of professional and collegiate ice hockey and for being a prominent personality on ESPN during that network's early years.

== Early life and career ==
Mees began his career as a student at the University of Delaware in Newark. After graduation in 1972, he became the sports director at WILM-AM radio in Wilmington. Mees returned to Delaware in 1992 when he announced the Blue Hens' America East Championship for ESPN from the field house.

After six years in Wilmington and one year at WECA-TV in Tallahassee, Florida, Mees was hired by ESPN as one of their first on-air personalities for the network's launch in 1979 on September 7. In 2005, he was inducted into the Delaware Sports Hall of Fame.

== ESPN ==
Mees was a lead anchor on SportsCenter from 1979 to 1985 when he took on hosting and occasional play-by-play duties for NHL on ESPN. ESPN later lost the NHL contract to SportsChannel America, and he returned full-time to SportsCenter. When the NHL returned to ESPN in 1992–93, he worked NHL games as a play-by-play man during the season with Darren Pang, Brian Engblom, and John Davidson as his analysts, and he hosted SportsCenter in the off-season. Mees was an early advocate of NCAA Ice Hockey on ESPN, worked play-by-play for the men's Frozen Four (NCAA Hockey's championship tournament), and contributed to the increased visibility of that tournament.

Other sports Mees called for ESPN included college basketball, college football, and Major League Baseball. He also anchored the network's coverage of the United States Football League in the 1980s.

By the 15th anniversary of ESPN, Mees (along with Chris Berman and Bob Ley) was one of three original SportsCenter anchors still with the network.

== Death ==
On August 14, 1996, Mees, who did not know how to swim, drowned in a neighbor's swimming pool in Southington, Connecticut. Police initially said that Mees had jumped into the pool to save his younger daughter but later said they did not know how he ended up in the water and classified his death as an accident.

He and Michelle, his wife of almost 10 years, had two daughters: Lauren who was 8 years old and Gabrielle who was 4 at the time of his death.
