= WIYY =

Rock radio station in Baltimore

- Baltimore, Maryland; United States
- Broadcast area: Baltimore metropolitan area
- Frequency: 97.9 MHz (HD Radio)
- Branding: 98 Rock

Programming
- Language: English
- Format: Mainstream rock
- Subchannels: HD2: Simulcast of WBAL (news/talk)
- Affiliations: Baltimore Orioles; Baltimore Ravens; United Stations Radio Networks

Ownership
- Owner: Hearst Communications; (Hearst Stations Inc.)
- Sister stations: WBAL; WBAL-TV

History
- First air date: December 7, 1958
- Former call signs: WFDS-FM (1958–1960); WBAL-FM (1960–1977)

Technical information
- Licensing authority: FCC
- Facility ID: 65693
- Class: B
- ERP: 13,000 watts (analog); 270 watts (digital)
- HAAT: 294 meters (965 ft)
- Transmitter coordinates: 39°20′5″N 76°39′2″W

Links
- Public license information: Public file; LMS
- Webcast: Listen live
- Website: www.98online.com

WIYY (97.9 FM, "98 Rock") is a commercial radio station in Baltimore, Maryland. It is owned by Hearst Communications and broadcasts a mainstream rock radio format. WIYY shares studios and offices with sister stations WBAL (1090 AM) and WBAL-TV (channel 11) on Television Hill in the Woodberry section of Baltimore. WIYY's transmitter utilizes WBAL-TV's 'candlestick' antenna on the shared Television Hill candelabra tower.

WIYY and WBAL are the flagship stations of the Baltimore Ravens radio network and the Baltimore Orioles Radio Network. The two are the only radio stations owned by the Hearst Corporation.

== History ==
In January 1948, WMAR-FM signed on for the first time on 97.9, owned by the A.S. Abell Company, publishers of the Baltimore Sun and founders of WMAR-TV, Baltimore's first television station. WMAR-FM was a collaborative partner of Transit Rides Inc., a Taft Broadcasting division using the format's early years to develop a background music service specifically for public transportation. While many Americans were buying TV sets, few owned FM radios. After two years on the air, Abell decided to shut down WMAR-FM in June 1950 and turned in its license to the Federal Communications Commission. (The callsign WMAR-FM returned to Baltimore in 1968 when Abell bought the station on 106.5, now WWMX).

The 97.9 frequency remained silent until December 1958 when WFDS-FM signed on for the first time, a classical music outlet under the ownership of William S. Cook, a Baltimore native and professional engineer. Cook created WFDS-FM as one of the first radio stations in the United States to experiment with stereo. The Hearst Corporation purchased the station in April 1960 and retained classical music while changing the call sign to WBAL-FM.

In June 1975, WBAL-FM joined NBC Radio Network's 24-hour national "News and Information Service" (NIS) becoming an all news radio station on the FM dial, rare in that era. It was the largest market network affiliate of NIS not to be an NBC Radio owned-and-operated station. After two years of all-news and low ratings, NBC closed down NIS in late May 1977, but WBAL-FM bailed on the service early.

WBAL-FM switched its call sign to WIYY and began its rock music format on March 28, 1977. It has used the 98 Rock branding since the flip. WIYY is a rare radio station that has kept the same format for multiple decades.

In 2005, WBAL and WIYY were named the flagship stations of the Baltimore Ravens Radio Network. In 2022, WBAL and WIYY became the official broadcaster of the Baltimore Orioles. The Hearst stations took over that designation from the Orioles' previous flagship, WJZ-FM.

== Awards ==
In 2007, the station was nominated for the Radio & Records magazine Active Rock Station of the Year Award for the top 25 markets. Other nominees included WAAF in Boston, KBPI in Denver, WRIF in Detroit, WMMR in Philadelphia, and KISW in Seattle.

WIYY was a nominee for the 2012 "Major Market Radio Station of the Year" RadioContraband Rock Radio Award.
