= WEHA =

- Port Republic, New Jersey; United States
- Broadcast area: Atlantic City
- Frequency: 88.7 MHz

Programming
- Format: Urban gospel

Ownership
- Owner: Spread The Gospel Inc.

History
- First air date: March 2003
- Former call signs: WIBF (2000–2002); WIBF-FM (2002–2003); WXXY-FM (2003–2008, 2009); WGXM (2008–2009)

Technical information
- Licensing authority: FCC
- Facility ID: 87809
- Class: A
- ERP: 800 watts
- HAAT: 67.9 meters (223 ft)
- Translator: 100.3 W262CF (Pleasantville)

Links
- Public license information: Public file; LMS
- Website: wehavegospel.com

WEHA (88.7 FM) is a Stellar Award winning radio station broadcasting an urban gospel format. Licensed to the suburb of Port Republic, New Jersey, it serves the Atlantic City metropolitan area. It first began broadcasting in 2003 under the call sign WIBF. The station is owned by Spread The Gospel Inc.

== History ==
On March 22, 2000, In His Sign Network (later renamed In His Name Broadcasting), was granted the 88.7 frequency to be licensed to Port Republic, NJ, with the call letters of WIBF. The station stayed silent for three years, until March 2003, when the station signed on the air for the first time, testing the waters with an R&B oldies musical format. This format would only survive less than a month, for in April 2003, WIBF began simulcasting contemporary Christian station WXHL-FM out of Christiana, Delaware. The simulcast would also be short lived, for the WIBF call sign was forfeited on May 16, 2003, and changed to WXXY-FM. On July 21, 2003, WXXY-FM began broadcasting an 1980s music format, with the moniker, "South Jersey's Eighties Channel!" WXXY-FM also used jingles from JAM Creative Productions. The WXXY-FM call sign had previously been assigned to 103.1 FM in Chicago from 1998 until 2003, which broadcast a similar 1980s music format from 1999 to 2001.

On August 17, 2004, WXXY-FM changed formats once again, due to the station having financial difficulties. WXXY-FM went back to airing religious programming, using the moniker of "South Jersey's Gospel Music Station". Originally using the ABC feed of Musical Soul Food, the station quickly went to a local feed of gospel music. On June 17, 2008, the call sign was changed to WGXM, changed back to WXXY-FM on July 15, 2009, and most recently to WEHA on August 1, 2009.

On January 19, 2013, WEHA won a Stellar Award (the highest honor in gospel music) for Radio Station of the Year in the small market category.

== On-air personalities ==
On air personalities for WEHA include the station owners William and Elaine Hawkes (known on air as El Presidente and Ladie Prayze). El Presidente hosts Gospel Smooth which features Gospel Jazz, soul, and neo-soul. Ladie Prayze hosts Making His Praise Glorious featuring gospel music and the Hour Of Power where she plays 60 minute sermons from today's most renowned preachers of the Gospel. Thelma Witherspoon hosts In The Community with Thelma Witherspoon which features news, announcements, and interviews with various important figures in the south Jersey area. Benny G hosts the Benny G Morning Show and is known for his classic voice and humorous characters as wells as interviews with today's top Gospel artists. Darchild Gospel recording artist Tamyya J hosts Never Missed A Beat featuring Gospel Hip Hop and Rhythm and Praise music as well as interviews with Gospel Artists. Dr. Nicole P. Lyles-Belton aka Dr. NYC hosts Power By The Hour featuring interviews, music, and great topics tackled by Dr. Nyc. George C hosts Gospel Connection featuring the Gospel classics and contemporary music. Steffin Phifer aka Supa Steff serves as the station's Production Director and hosts “HashtagGospel with Supa Steff & THE SQUAD” along with E. Lee, The Real P-2, TalJay, Lady TY, Beyoncé Jerkins, and Minister D Hutt featuring unfiltered discussions on news headlines and lifestyle topics from a Christian perspective.
