= WJKI-FM =

- Bethany Beach, Delaware; United States
- Broadcast area: Bethany Beach, Delaware; Ocean City, Maryland; Milford, Delaware; Georgetown, Delaware
- Frequency: 103.5 MHz
- Branding: 103.5 & 102.9 The Vault

Programming
- Format: Mainstream rock
- Affiliations: Compass Media Networks; Westwood One

Ownership
- Owner: The Voice Radio Network; (The Voice Radio, LLC)
- Sister stations: WJKI; WJWL; WKDB; WKHI; WZEB

History
- First air date: 1996 (as WZSK)
- Former call signs: WJTI (1993–1995); WZSK (1995–1997); WJYN (1997–2000); WJNE (2000–2004); WJKI (2004–2018)

Technical information
- Licensing authority: FCC
- Facility ID: 30858
- Class: A
- ERP: 1,450 watts
- HAAT: 146 meters (479 ft)
- Transmitter coordinates: 38°34′21.4″N 75°6′56.6″W

Links
- Public license information: Public file; LMS
- Webcast: Listen live
- Website: www.thevaultrocks.com

WJKI-FM (103.5 MHz) is a radio station licensed to serve Bethany Beach, Delaware. The station is owned by The Voice Radio Network. It airs a mainstream rock format. The station has been assigned these call letters by the Federal Communications Commission since November 21, 2018.

With the sale of WXSH, the classic rock format is now being simulcast on WJKI (1320 AM; formerly WICO) and on 102.9 FM (W275CX).

Previous logo
