= List of Baltimore Ravens broadcasters =

The flagship radio stations of the professional American football team, the Baltimore Ravens, are Hearst-owned WIYY (98 Rock) and WBAL 1090 AM, with Kyle Youmans as the play-by-play announcer and Rod Woodson (Baltimore Ravens CB-S 1998–2001) as the color commentator. Gerry Sandusky had been the primary voice since the team changed flagship stations in 2006 until his retirement after the 2025 season. Long-time WMAR-TV sports director and anchor Scott Garceau and Tom Matte had previously formed the nucleus of the broadcast team for the franchise's first ten seasons.

The team's flagship station is WIYY/WBAL sister station WBAL-TV, which broadcasts NFL preseason games and team programming throughout the season. The programming is syndicated to WJLA-TV in Washington, WBOC-TV in Salisbury, WGAL in the Harrisburg–Lebanon–York–Lancaster, Pennsylvania market, and until 2017, was carried through the remainder of the team's region by CSN Mid-Atlantic. In January 2017, the Ravens announced that it had cut ties with CSN Mid-Atlantic, as the network was cutting back on its day-to-day coverage of other teams in the region in order to focus more extensively on the Washington Capitals and Wizards—whose games are broadcast by CSN Mid-Atlantic, and whose owner holds a stake in the network. The team announced that it would seek a new partner; until 2010, these rights were held by MASN.

The Ravens' regular season games are typically broadcast by WJZ-TV as part of CBS's rights to the AFC (also includes the 2024 Christmas Day game, which the NFL legally declared a CBS game that airs on primary market affiliates), but games may occasionally be broadcast on WBAL (Sunday Night Football or national non-ABC simulcast Monday Night Football because of Hearst ownership), WBFF-TV if the Ravens host an NFC team, and WMAR-TV (national ABC simulcast Monday Night Football and Thursday Night Football because of Scripps ownership).

== Radio announcers ==
Year	Flagship station	Play-by-play	Color commentator
2026	WBAL, WIYY	Kyle Youmans	Rod Woodson
2025	WBAL, WIYY	Gerry Sandusky	Rod Woodson
2024	WBAL, WIYY	Gerry Sandusky	Rod Woodson
2023	WBAL, WIYY	Gerry Sandusky	Rod Woodson
2022	WBAL, WIYY	Gerry Sandusky	Rod Woodson
2021	WBAL, WIYY	Gerry Sandusky	Obafemi Ayanbadejo
2020	WBAL, WIYY	Gerry Sandusky	Obafemi Ayanbadejo, Dennis Pitta
2019	WBAL, WIYY	Gerry Sandusky	Jarret Johnson
2018	WBAL, WIYY	Gerry Sandusky	Dennis Pitta, Jarret Johnson, Justin Forsett (away sideline reporter), Kirk McEwen (home sideline reporter)
2017	WBAL, WIYY	Gerry Sandusky	Stan White, Dennis Pitta (games 1–4), Todd Heap (games 5–8), Justin Forsett (games 9–12), Jarret Johnson (games 13–16)
2016	WBAL, WIYY	Gerry Sandusky	Stan White, Qadry Ismail
2015	WBAL, WIYY	Gerry Sandusky	Stan White, Qadry Ismail
2014	WBAL, WIYY	Gerry Sandusky	Stan White, Qadry Ismail
2013	WBAL, WIYY	Gerry Sandusky	Stan White, Qadry Ismail
2012	WBAL, WIYY	Gerry Sandusky	Stan White, Qadry Ismail
2011	WBAL, WIYY	Gerry Sandusky	Stan White, Qadry Ismail
2010	WBAL, WIYY	Gerry Sandusky	Stan White, Qadry Ismail
2009	WBAL, WIYY	Gerry Sandusky	Stan White, Rob Burnett
2008	WBAL, WIYY	Gerry Sandusky	Stan White, Rob Burnett
2007	WBAL, WIYY	Gerry Sandusky	Stan White, Rob Burnett
2006	WBAL, WIYY	Gerry Sandusky	Stan White, Rob Burnett
2005	WJFK, WLIF	Scott Garceau	Tom Matte
2004	WJFK, WLIF	Scott Garceau	Tom Matte
2003	WJFK, WLIF	Scott Garceau	Tom Matte
2002	WJFK, WLIF	Scott Garceau	Tom Matte
2001	WJFK, WLIF	Scott Garceau	Tom Matte
2000	WJFK, WLIF	Scott Garceau	Tom Matte
1999	WJFK, WLIF	Scott Garceau	Tom Matte
1998	WJFK, WLIF	Scott Garceau	Tom Matte
1997	WJFK, WLIF	Scott Garceau	Tom Matte, Bruce Cunningham (sideline reporter)
1996	WJFK, WLIF	Scott Garceau	Tom Matte, Bruce Cunningham

== Radio network ==
Ravens radio broadcasts air on seventeen stations spanning five states and the District of Columbia (updated as of 13 August 2026).

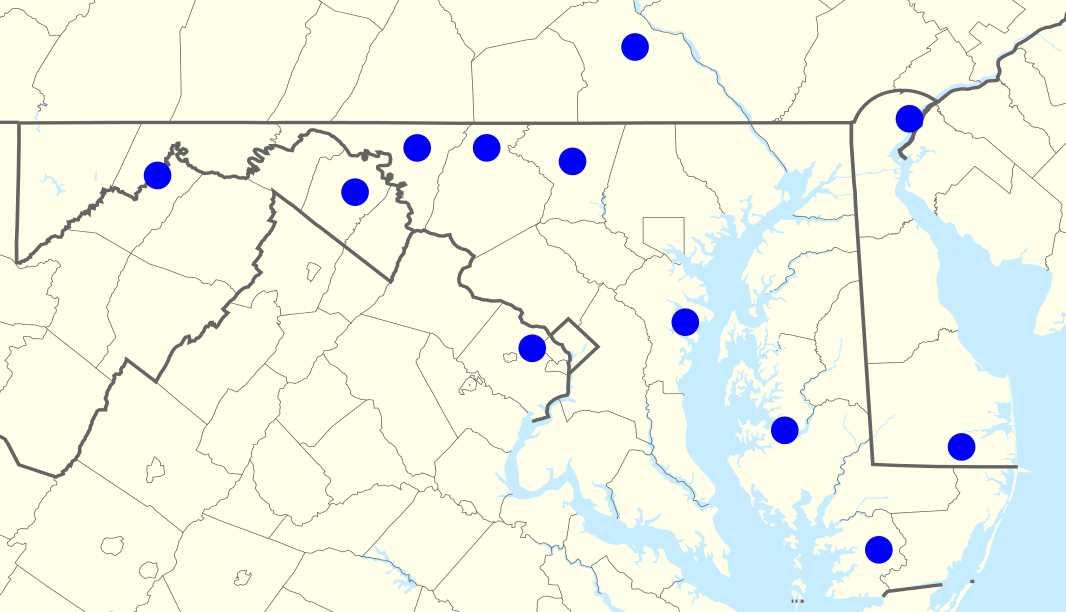
Map of radio affiliates.

Terrestrial Affiliates
State	Market	Frequency	Call Sign
Maryland	Baltimore	1090 AM	WBAL (co-flagship)
Maryland	Baltimore	97.9 FM	WIYY (co-flagship)
Maryland	Annapolis	810 AM	WYRE
Maryland	Cambridge	100.9 FM	WAAI
Maryland	Cumberland	1230 AM	WCMD
Maryland	Hagerstown	1490 AM	WARK
Maryland	Pocomoke City	106.1 FM	WBBX
Maryland	Silver Spring	93.5 FM	W228DI
	Washington, D.C.	630 AM	WSBN
Kentucky	Louisville	93.9 FM	WLCL
Pennsylvania	Hanover	98.5 FM	WYCR
Virginia	Charlottesville	107.5 FM	WCHV
Virginia	Harrisonburg	1360 AM	WHBG
Virginia	Richmond	106.1 FM	W291CL
West Virginia	Berkeley Springs	1010 AM	WCST
West Virginia	Keyser	1390 AM	WKLP
West Virginia	Martinsburg	1340 AM	WEPM
