= Beach Haven West, New Jersey =

Populated place in Ocean County, New Jersey, US

- Census-designated place
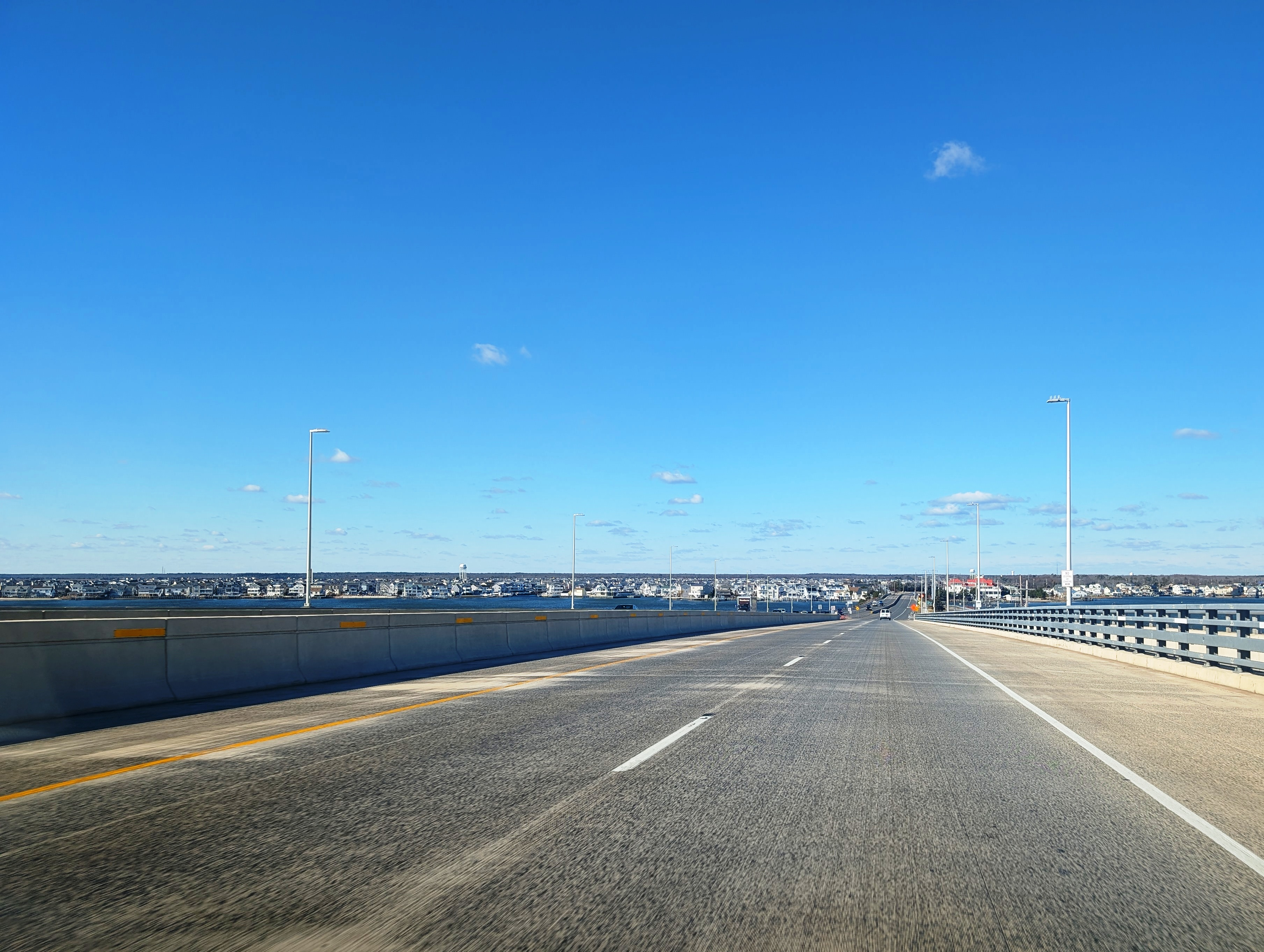
- Beach Haven West as seen from the Route 72 Manahawkin Bay Bridge

- Map of Beach Haven West CDP in Ocean County. Inset: Location of Ocean County in New Jersey.

- Location in Ocean County Location in New Jersey Location in the United States
- Coordinates: 39.670428°N 74.233123°W
- Country: United States
- State: New Jersey
- County: Ocean
- Township: Stafford

Area
  - Total: 2.12 sq mi (5.48 km^{2})
  - Land: 1.62 sq mi (4.20 km^{2})
  - Water: 0.49 sq mi (1.28 km^{2}) 25.47%
- Elevation: 3.3 ft (1 m)

Population (2020)
  - Total: 4,143
  - Density: 2,557.4/sq mi (987.4/km^{2})
- Time zone: UTC−05:00 (Eastern (EST))
  - Summer (DST): UTC−04:00 (Eastern (EDT))
- ZIP Code: 08050
- Area code: 609
- FIPS code: 34-04120
- GNIS feature ID: 02389182

Beach Haven West is an unincorporated community and census-designated place (CDP) constituting a part of the Jersey Shore community of Stafford Township, in southern Ocean County, within the U.S. state of New Jersey. As of the 2020 United States census, the CDP's population was 4,143, an increase of 247 (+6.3%) from the 3,896 recorded at the 2010 census, which in turn had reflected a decrease of 548 (−12.3%) from the 4,444 counted in the 2000 census.

== History ==
The site that Beach Haven West is located on was known as Remson Meadows along the Manahawkin Bayfront. In 1950, the salt marshes were bought by the Shapiro brothers, Herbert and Jerome, who developed vacation homes throughout the Jersey Shore. Using a dredge towed up from North Carolina, construction began on Beach Haven West's 130-plus saltwater lagoons and 5,000 single-family homes.

Beach Haven West was built in phases, the first opening in 1957. The first phase contained the lagoons and cul-de-sacs branching between Morris Boulevard and Jennifer Lane. By the early 1960s, the second phase was completed, this one spanning between Jonathan Drive and Walter Boulevard. Afterwards, the third phase was completed, which contained the development along Mill Creek Road between Route 72 and Jonathan Drive, as well as the Charles Boulevard spur. By the 1970s, the lagoon-front community was expanded down Mill Creek Road towards East Point.

The Shapiros later sold their remaining properties to Lincoln Properties, LLC, another shore development firm. They completed the Mill Creek Road section along Mill Creek down to Barnegat Bay at East Point, added the southern lagoons along Newell Avenue known as Village Harbour, and developed the Colony Lakes section by 1986.

Through satellite imagery, it is evident that the community was intended to expand below the delta of Mill Creek at the bay. Ghosts of about a dozen partially dredged lagoons in that area, as well as a curious curve in Newell Avenue, indicate the planned expansion. However, a lack of permits, increasing pressure from the EPA and the Wetlands Protection Act of 1970 kept the community from expanding further.

== Geography ==
According to the United States Census Bureau, Beach Haven West had a total area of 2.143 square miles (5.55 km^{2}), including 1.597 square miles (4.14 km^{2}) of land and 0.546 square miles (1.41 km^{2}) of water (25.47%).

The name "Beach Haven West" is a misnomer because it actually lies directly due north from the borough of Beach Haven. It can be speculated that "west" was chosen because the mainland is generally west of Long Beach Island, where Beach Haven is located.

== Demographics ==
Historical population
Census	Pop.	Note	%±
1980	3,020		—
1990	4,237		40.3%
2000	4,444		4.9%
2010	3,896		−12.3%
2020	4,143		6.3%
Population sources: 1950 1960 1970; 1980 1990 2000; 2010 2020

Beach Haven West first appeared as a census designated place in the 1980 U.S. census.

=== Racial and ethnic composition ===
Beach Haven West CDP, New Jersey – Racial and ethnic composition Note: the US Census treats Hispanic/Latino as an ethnic category. This table excludes Latinos from the racial categories and assigns them to a separate category. Hispanics/Latinos may be of any race.
Race / Ethnicity (NH = Non-Hispanic)	Pop 2000	Pop 2010	Pop 2020	% 2000	% 2010	% 2020
White alone (NH)	4,272	3,683	3,827	96.13%	94.53%	92.37%
Black or African American alone (NH)	16	14	1	0.36%	0.36%	0.02%
Native American or Alaska Native alone (NH)	1	4	6	0.02%	0.10%	0.14%
Asian alone (NH)	34	27	35	0.77%	0.69%	0.84%
Native Hawaiian or Pacific Islander alone (NH)	4	0	2	0.09%	0.00%	0.05%
Other race alone (NH)	0	0	2	0.00%	0.00%	0.05%
Mixed race or Multiracial (NH)	20	21	63	0.45%	0.54%	1.52%
Hispanic or Latino (any race)	97	147	207	2.18%	3.77%	5.00%
Total	4,444	3,896	4,143	100.00%	100.00%	100.00%

=== 2020 census ===
As of the 2020 census, Beach Haven West had a population of 4,143. The median age was 59.7 years. 10.0% of residents were under the age of 18 and 37.2% were 65 years of age or older. For every 100 females there were 97.8 males, and for every 100 females age 18 and older there were 97.8 males age 18 and older.

100.0% of residents lived in urban areas, while 0.0% lived in rural areas.

There were 2,010 households, of which 13.7% had children under the age of 18 living in them. Of all households, 56.0% were married-couple households, 18.9% were households with a male householder and no spouse or partner present, and 21.0% were households with a female householder and no spouse or partner present. About 29.2% of households were made up of individuals, and 16.2% had someone living alone who was 65 years of age or older.

There were 4,502 housing units, of which 55.4% were vacant. The homeowner vacancy rate was 1.8% and the rental vacancy rate was 14.3%.

=== 2010 census ===
The 2010 United States census counted 3,896 people, 1,915 households, and 1,212 families in the CDP. The population density was 2,439.1 people per square mile (941.7 people/km^{2}). There were 4,571 housing units at an average density of 2,861.7 units per square mile (1,104.9 units/km^{2}). The racial makeup was 97.33% (3,792) White, 0.49% (19) Black or African American, 0.23% (9) Native American, 0.72% (28) Asian, 0.00% (0) Pacific Islander, 0.69% (27) from other races, and 0.54% (21) from two or more races. Hispanic or Latino of any race were 3.77% (147) of the population.

Of the 1,915 households, 11.0% had children under the age of 18; 53.5% were married couples living together; 6.4% had a female householder with no husband present and 36.7% were non-families. Of all households, 32.1% were made up of individuals and 16.2% had someone living alone who was 65 years of age or older. The average household size was 2.03 and the average family size was 2.51.

10.0% of the population were under the age of 18, 5.6% from 18 to 24, 13.8% from 25 to 44, 36.9% from 45 to 64, and 33.7% who were 65 years of age or older. The median age was 57.9 years. For every 100 females, the population had 94.0 males. For every 100 females ages 18 and older there were 93.2 males.

=== 2000 census ===
As of the 2000 United States census there were 4,444 people, 2,086 households, and 1,372 families residing in the CDP. The population density was 849.4 people/km^{2} (2,200 people/mi^{2}). There were 4,514 housing units at an average density of 862.8 units/km^{2} (2,235 units/mi^{2}). The racial makeup of the CDP was 97.73% White, 0.36% African American, 0.02% Native American, 0.77% Asian, 0.09% Pacific Islander, 0.47% from other races, and 0.56% from two or more races. Hispanic or Latino of any race were 2.18% of the population.

There were 2,086 households, out of which 14.3% had children under the age of 18 living with them, 56.2% were married couples living together, 6.5% had a female householder with no husband present, and 34.2% were non-families. 28.9% of all households were made up of individuals, and 14.0% had someone living alone who was 65 years of age or older. The average household size was 2.13 and the average family size was 2.59.

In the CDP the population was spread out, with 12.6% under the age of 18, 4.8% from 18 to 24, 19.7% from 25 to 44, 35.0% from 45 to 64, and 27.9% who were 65 years of age or older. The median age was 53 years. For every 100 females, there were 94.1 males. For every 100 females age 18 and over, there were 91.7 males.

The median income for a household in the CDP was $45,508, and the median income for a family was $54,132. Males had a median income of $46,500 versus $30,491 for females. The per capita income for the CDP was $39,273. About 1.5% of families and 3.8% of the population were below the poverty line, including 1.5% of those under age 18 and 6.3% of those age 65 or over.

== Community ==
Many of the homes in Beach Haven West are summer residences for those who live in other parts of New Jersey, New York, Pennsylvania, Florida and other states, although year-round residents have become more frequent. The area is served by the Stafford Township School District from grades K-6, and the Southern Regional School District from grades 7–12.

=== Homes ===
The first model home, an expandable Cape Cod-style house, opened on Selma Drive in 1957. Like many Capes, this home had one finished floor with two bedrooms, the attic was capable of expansion with dormers, and there was an outside shower. The style was pure 1950s: wide-exposure asbestos siding, aluminum jalousie windows throughout, and dark wood paneling inside. The colors were all pastels, ranging from canary yellow, pistachio green, and bright pink, to name a few. Mass production methods were utilized to erect the homes efficiently.

The lots were all 50 feet wide along the lagoon and 80 feet deep running towards the street. Phase one featured 60-foot-wide (18 m) lots. Double lots and irregular lots were available along the bends and corners of the lagoon. In the 1950s, waterfront lots with a house sold for $6,990, and financing of $66 a month was available.

Soon, additional models were added and the two-bedroom cape was dropped. The least expensive was the Sandpiper model, totaling $11,990. which was a 3 bedroom ranch. Keeping the same modern architectural style, the three bedrooms were arranged along the front of the house facing the street. Behind them was a single full bath, a kitchenette, and a living room. All interior spaces featured exposed rafter vaulted ceilings with rigid insulation on the roof. Base models featured a screened porch stretching completely across the back of the house, which was covered by a long, gently sloping roof. A common upgrade was to have the porch enclosed with jalousie windows. The home was completed with an outdoor shower, an option of either a wooden bulkhead or a wooden deck along the lagoon, and two young willow trees in the back yard.

The largest model available was the Continental Riviera, which sold for about $23,000 in the 1970s. Homes in East Point and Village Harbour were built in the typical 1980s Post-Modern style. Colony Lakes homes were Colonial representative. All homes built by Lincoln were reversed living homes, where the bedrooms were downstairs and the living spaces on the second floor.

=== Beach Haven West Civic Association ===
Originally, the community had a recreation center located at intersection of Jonathan Drive, Morris Boulevard, Jennifer Lane, and Jeffrey Drive. The rec center featured a clubhouse, boat slips, and a swimming pool, which was the center of the Beach Haven West social scene throughout the 1950s and 1960s. By the 1980s, the pool was infilled and the clubhouse demolished. Modern 1980s-style homes were later built on the site, and belong to some of few homes in the complex which do not have waterfront access.

The Civic Association has been revitalized, and continues to operate at a new location on Mill Creek Road. It serves the community in many capacities, from "Mom and Me" playgroups and other Stafford Recreation-sponsored programs, to other usergroup functions (Stafford Township Regular Republican Club meetings) as well as a voting location on Election Days.
