= WKDB =

Radio station in Laurel, Delaware

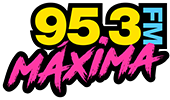
- Laurel, Delaware; United States
- Broadcast area: Salisbury-Ocean City
- Frequency: 95.3 MHz
- Branding: Máxima 95.3

Programming
- Language: Spanish
- Format: Contemporary hit radio

Ownership
- Owner: Ritmo Broadcasting, LLC
- Operator: The Voice Radio Network
- Sister stations: WJKI; WJKI-FM; WJWL; WKHI; WZEB

History
- First air date: 1991
- Former call signs: WDNO (1989–1997); WJNE (1997–2000); WQJH (2000–2003)

Technical information
- Licensing authority: FCC
- Facility ID: 16661
- Class: A
- ERP: 6,000 watts
- HAAT: 100 meters (330 ft)
- Transmitter coordinates: 38°30′12.4″N 75°39′37.7″W

Links
- Public license information: Public file; LMS
- Webcast: Listen live
- Website: holamusica.com/station-wkdb

WKDB (95.3 FM) is a commercial radio station broadcasting a Spanish contemporary hit radio format. Licensed to Laurel, Delaware, United States, the station serves the Salisbury-Ocean City area. The station is owned by The Voice Radio Network.

On August 24, 2009, Great Scott Broadcasting broke apart. The B 101.7/95.3, and began simulcasting Studio 106.1 on 95.3 FM with an old school R&B format. The format was dropped in late 2011, as the station reverted to a simulcast of WZEB.

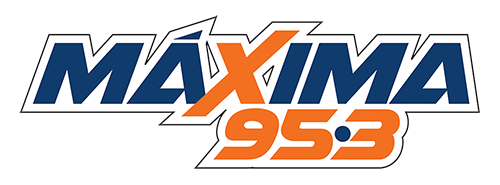
Previous logo

On November 3, 2014, WKDB changed its format to Spanish hits, branded as "Máxima 95.3".
