= WMHS (FM) =

- Pike Creek, Delaware; United States
- Broadcast area: Wilmington, Delaware
- Frequency: 88.1 MHz
- Branding: EDge Radio

Programming
- Format: Variety

Ownership
- Owner: Red Clay Consolidated School District

History
- First air date: 1998
- Former call signs: WBMO (1999–2000)
- Call sign meaning: McKean High School

Technical information
- Licensing authority: FCC
- Facility ID: 90384
- Class: A
- ERP: 88 watts (vert.)
- HAAT: 37 meters (121 ft)
- Transmitter coordinates: 39°45′27″N 75°40′02″W

Links
- Public license information: Public file; LMS

WMHS (88.1 FM, "EDge Radio") is a high school radio station licensed to serve Pike Creek, Delaware, United States. The station is owned by the Red Clay Consolidated School District and operated by the students of Thomas McKean High School. It airs a variety format.

The station has been assigned these call letters by the Federal Communications Commission since January 12, 2000.

== See also ==
- WMPH: Brandywine School District station at Mount Pleasant High
- List of community radio stations in the United States
