= WRJE =

Radio station in Dover, Delaware (1957–2016)

- Dover, Delaware; United States
- Broadcast area: Dover, Delaware
- Frequency: 1600 kHz
- Branding: Sabrosa Radio

Programming
- Format: Regional Mexican

Ownership
- Owner: EKO Media Group, Inc.

History
- First air date: August 2, 1957
- Last air date: January 13, 2016 (Note: Date of license cancellation.)
- Former call signs: WKEN (1957–1997); WQVL (1997–2000); WAMS (2000–2002); WNRK (2002); WKEN (2002); WIBF (2002–2004); WKEN (2004–2005); WRJE (2005–2007); WAMS (2007); WXXY (2007–2009); WDPZ (2009); WAMS (2009–2011); WMHZ (2011); WAMS (2011)

Technical information
- Facility ID: 21632
- Class: B
- Power: 5,000 watts daytime; 1,000 watts nighttime
- Transmitter coordinates: 39°10′11″N 75°33′13″W

WRJE (1600 AM) was a radio station licensed to Dover, Delaware. It first began broadcasting in 1957 under the call sign WKEN, and remained licensed until 2016.

== History ==
The station went on the air August 2, 1957, as WKEN. It became WQVL on February 23, 1997, and was renamed WAMS on January 31, 2001. The station was unrelated to WTMC (1380 AM), a radio station in Wilmington which used the WAMS call sign from 1947 to 2000. The call sign was briefly changed to WNRK on March 26, 2002, then reverted to WKEN less than two months later. On July 21, 2002, the call sign was changed to WIBF to match WIBF-FM 88.7 in Port Republic, New Jersey, which it had been simulcasting. On October 13, 2004, the station reverted to its original call sign WKEN for a third time. The original call sign remained in effect for almost a year until September 28, 2005, when the call sign was again changed to WRJE. The WAMS call sign returned to 1600 AM for a second time on January 11, 2007, and remained until July 10, 2007, when the call sign was changed to the call letters WXXY, again to match WXXY-FM 88.7 in Port Republic, which it was once again simulcasting.

By June 2008, the FM station in New Jersey dropped the WXXY-FM call sign for WGMX and dropped the simulcast. By 2009, WXXY was still broadcasting a gospel music format and had added an FM translator on 98.7 MHz in Dover with the call sign "W254AT". The station branded itself "Praise 98.7". The call sign changed again on May 15, 2009, to WDPZ. On September 7, 2009, the callsign was changed back to WAMS, playing an oldies format; also the frequency changed to 98.3 FM on translator W252CH. It also used translator W286BS (105.1 FM) in Milford, Delaware. On April 21, 2011, this station changed its call sign from WAMS to WMHZ. On September 29, 2011, WMHZ changed call signs back to WAMS. On November 6, 2011, WAMS changed formats from 1980s music back to gospel music. On November 17, 2011, WAMS changed call signs back to WRJE. On February 10, 2012, WRJE changed formats to regional Mexican, branded as "Sabrosa Radio".

The WRJE license was cancelled by the Federal Communications Commission on January 13, 2016, due to the station owner's failure to provide information required by said agency.
