= WMPH =

Radio station in Wilmington, Delaware

Coordinates: 39.773°N 75.507°W

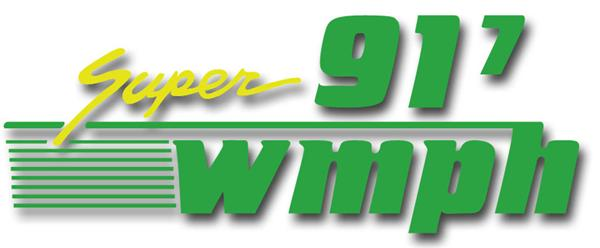
- Wilmington, Delaware; United States
- Broadcast area: Northern Wilmington Delaware and surrounding areas
- Frequency: 91.7 MHz
- Branding: Super 91.7

Programming
- Format: Classic/Contemporary/Alternative Rock, Jazz, Community, and School District based programming

Ownership
- Owner: Brandywine School District Board of Education

History
- First air date: April 23, 1970
- Call sign meaning: Mount Pleasant High School

Technical information
- Licensing authority: FCC
- Class: A
- ERP: 100 watts
- HAAT: 44 meters (144 ft)

Links
- Public license information: Public file; LMS
- Website: http://www.brandywineschools.org/wmph

WMPH (91.7 FM, "Super 91.7") is Delaware's first high school radio station, located in Wilmington. The Brandywine School District Board of Education owns the license granted by the FCC. The call letters WMPH stand for Mount Pleasant High and offered several program formats including Top 40, progressive rock, dance and now classic and alternative music. WMPH signed off the air on June 11, 2010 but has since been totally renovated and came back on-air at full power on June 3, 2011 in a classic/alternative rock, jazz and community based format.

In 2014, WMPH partnered with Delaware First Media, which owns and operates the NPR affiliate WDDE in Dover, to create Delaware Public Media. WMPH carries NPR programming during morning and afternoon drive times.

== History ==
Jesse Morris, Class of 1968, was running for the Mount Pleasant Senior High School student council. On the Morris Ticket was the proposal for a student-run low power radio station. The radio station was initially proposed in May 1967 prior to the student council election. The student council election was held on May 20, 1967. Jesse Morris was elected Student Council President for the Class of 1968. On May 23, Robert Huber (also Class of 1968) was appointed radio station manager and project coordinator. The school administration was helpful and supportive of this ambitious project. On February 19, 1968, the Mount Pleasant Board of Education submitted the FCC application. The FCC issued a non-commercial FM low power educational radio station construction permit to the school board on October 15, 1968. This was the first permit of its kind to be granted for the State of Delaware. WMPH radio first signed on the air October 1, 1969. The faculty advisor was Ron Webster under the direction of school district administrator Jack Vinokur.

WMPH began broadcasting with 1.52 watts effective radiated power from a tower atop the school. In 1975 the station increased its output to 28.2 watts ERP. WMPH reaches over a half million potential listeners in Wilmington Delaware and surrounding communities. In 1980 the station increased its output to 100 watts ERP and replaced its horizontally polarized antenna with a circularly polarized antenna for better reception on car radios. Located at Mount Pleasant High School and part of the Brandywine School District, WMPH currently broadcasts at 100 watts ERP and serves as part of the Broadcast Learning Center of Mount Pleasant High School.

WMPH was known as "The Non-Commercial Rock Station" during its heyday in the 1970s with a Top 40 and Progressive Rock format. The station was entirely operated by Mount Pleasant High School students many of whom went on to careers in the radio broadcasting industry. Original studios were in the basement of the high school. The station kept broadcasting hours before the school day with announcers such as "The Dutchman" Guy VanderLek and "Big Al" Ingalls. After the school day the station would sign back on at 3 PM with more student announcers including Joy VanderLek (who went on to be an air talent at Connecticut Radio Network), Bruce Weiner, Stephen D. Streiker, David Mackenzie, Steve Balick, Leigh Jacobs, and Mike Schwartz (to name a very few). Well known Broadway actor John Dossett was an announcer (1972–1976) while he attended Mount Pleasant.

The radio station was dark (off the air) from 1990–1993. The school district actually forfeited the FCC broadcast license and nearby West Chester University was trying to obtain it. Clint Dantinne gave a proposal to the superintendent to resurrect the defunct station. Had he not interceded at that time, WMPH would have been closed permanently. Under his management, WMPH returned to the air March 1, 1993. It was at this time he chose 'Super 91.7' as the new slogan. The school district printshop and graphics coordinator, Al Minuti, designed the logo. Clint Dantinne founded the Broadcast Learning Center incorporating radio, television, film club, recording studio, puppets, newspaper, and web team at Mount Pleasant High School. Dantinne remained the faculty manager until the end of the 2010 school year.

WMPH has always been located at Mount Pleasant High School (Wilmington, Delaware) on the corner of Washington Street Extension and Marsh Road with the exception of the 1995–1996 school year. The entire building was renovated, and the radio studios were temporarily moved to a trailer at the Claymont Education Center.

During the past 50 years, the station had been a training ground for many aspiring broadcasters. Alumni include WSTW's Mike Rossi (inducted in the Mount Pleasant Hall of Fame under real name William Schwartz on October 28, 2011) and Clear Channel Radio executive Leigh Jacobs. Dave Mays, DJ for MTV Spring Break and Sirius Satellite Radio, first learned the trade at WMPH in the 90s. WMPH was also one of two non-commercial stations owned by school districts in the United States that programmed a continuous Dance music format, KNHC / Seattle, Washington is the other. The new WMPH has switched formats to include a wider array of programming including classic/progressive rock, alternative, jazz, and various student/district related functions including interviews, sports, and band/choral concert events.

The 40th anniversary of WMPH was celebrated on October 23, 2009 at the Mount Pleasant Hall of Fame induction ceremony. The event, held every two years around homecoming weekend, was celebrated at the nearby Brandywine Hundred Fire Company. The Mount Pleasant Hall of Fame CLASS OF 2009 inductees were Arthur Colbourn, John Crum, Carol Hoffecker, Rodney Lambert, John Jancuska, and WMPH founders Jesse Morris and Bob Huber. Dr. Jesse Morris was introduced by student Haley Hirzel and then his wife. Bob Huber was introduced by student Todd Hartsock. Teacher Kelli Bradley presented the plaque to our final inductee of the evening. Student Alex Sprague then introduced WMPH manager Clint Dantinne who gave a multimedia presentation.

On June 11, 2010, WMPH went 'dark' while a new manager was sought. During this transition period, the school district decided to refurbish the studios with a new look and brand-new equipment. The broadcast operation returned nearly a year later on June 3, 2011. The new operation is under the direction and management of radio industry veteran Paul Lewis (Wishengrad) formerly of WJBR-FM and BSD Information Systems Director, Pat Bush. The studio is under final renovations and went back on-air on June 3, 2011 with a Classic/Alternative Rock, Jazz and district/community program formats. WMPH shares the 91.7 frequency locally with Drexel University's WKDU to its north, West Chester University's WCUR to its northwest, and WRTI, Dover to its south.

== See also ==
- WMHS (FM): Red Clay Consolidated School District station at Thomas McKean High School
