= WBAL (AM) =

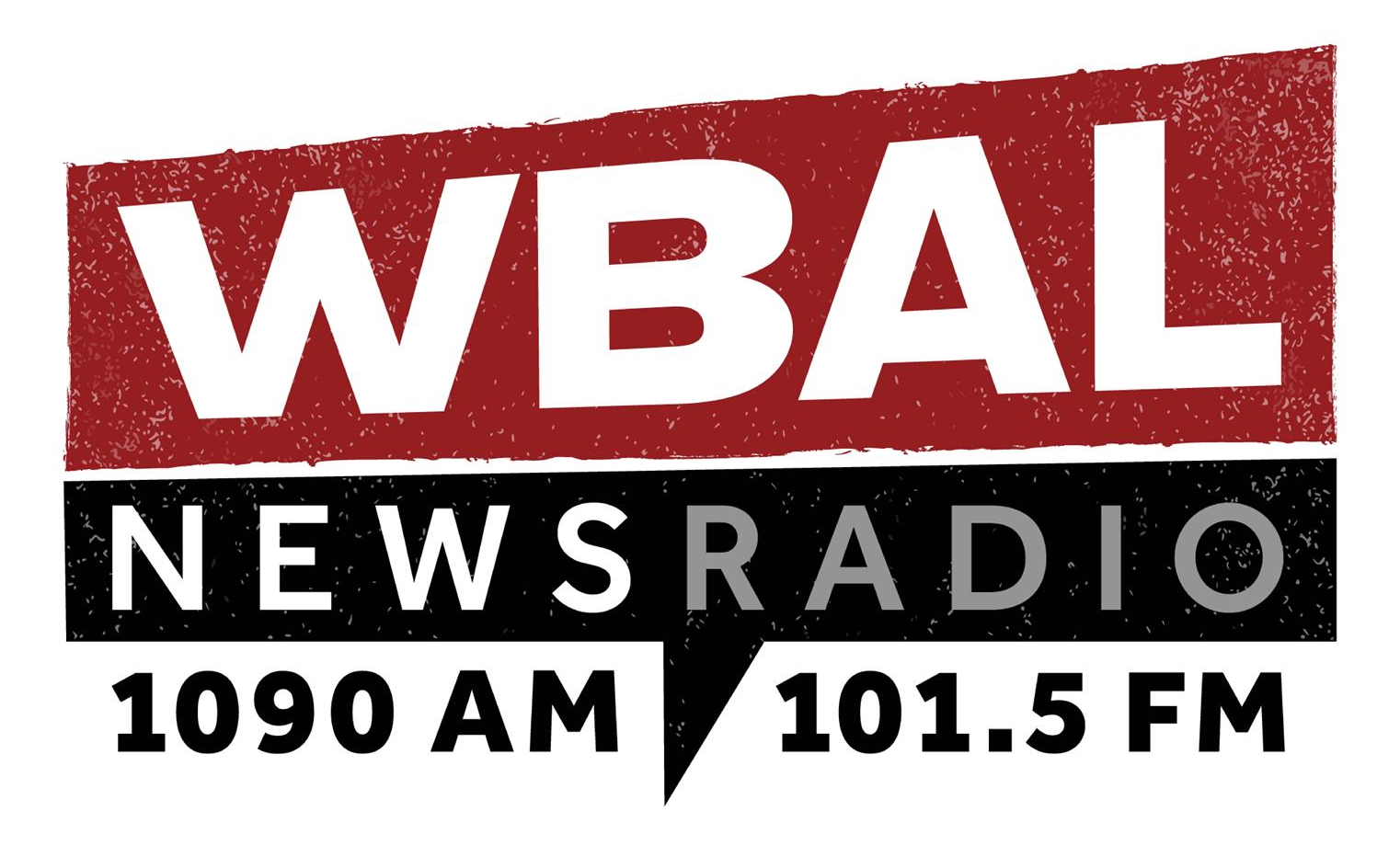
- Baltimore, Maryland; United States
- Broadcast area: Baltimore metropolitan area
- Frequency: 1090 kHz
- Branding: WBAL Newsradio 1090 and FM 101.5

Programming
- Format: News/talk
- Affiliations: ABC News Radio; Fox News Talk; Premiere Networks; Westwood One; Baltimore Orioles Radio Network; Baltimore Ravens Radio Network

Ownership
- Owner: Hearst Communications; (Hearst Stations Inc.)
- Sister stations: WBAL-TV; WIYY

History
- First air date: November 2, 1925
- Former frequencies: 1220 kHz (1925–1927); 1050 kHz (1927–1928); 1060 kHz (1928–1941)
- Call sign meaning: Baltimore

Technical information
- Licensing authority: FCC
- Facility ID: 65679
- Class: A
- Power: 50,000 watts
- Transmitter coordinates: 39°22′33.38″N 76°46′19.91″W
- Translator: See § Translators
- Repeater: 97.9 WIYY-HD2 (Baltimore)

Links
- Public license information: Public file; LMS
- Webcast: Listen live
- Website: www.wbal.com

WBAL (1090 kHz) is a commercial AM radio station licensed to Baltimore, Maryland. It is owned by the broadcasting division of Hearst Communications and broadcasts a news/talk radio format. The station shares its studios and offices with sister stations WBAL-TV (channel 11) and WIYY (97.9 FM) on Television Hill in Baltimore's Woodberry neighborhood. WBAL and WIYY are the only two radio stations owned by Hearst, which is primarily a publishing and television company.

WBAL is a 50,000-watt, Class A, clear-channel station. Its transmitter is on Winands Road in Randallstown, Maryland. Listeners in and around Baltimore can also hear the station on 136-watt FM translator station W268BA on 101.5 MHz. WBAL is non-directional by day but uses a directional antenna at night to protect the other Class A station on 1090 AM, XEPRS in Rosarito, Mexico. With a good radio, WBAL's nighttime signal can be heard in much of Eastern North America, reaching as far as Nova Scotia and Bermuda. Its daytime signal easily covers most of Maryland as well as the Washington metropolitan area, and parts of Delaware, Virginia, and Pennsylvania. WBAL is Maryland's designated primary entry point for the Emergency Alert System.

== Programming ==
=== Sports ===
WBAL is the co-flagship station with WIYY for Baltimore Orioles baseball, Baltimore Ravens football, and Navy Midshipmen football.

Since the Baltimore Orioles began their inaugural season in 1954, WBAL has been their flagship station for most of that team's history, though not continuously. For example, it carried Orioles games every season from 1987 to 2006, after which the team's games were broadcast on crosstown sports radio station WJZ-FM. Orioles games returned to WBAL from 2011 to 2014 before the team switched back to WJZ-FM in 2015. On January 5, 2022, it was announced that the Orioles would return to WBAL and sister station WIYY for the 2022 season. The games are also streamed on the respective stations' websites and apps, but with MLB-required georestrictions limiting the broadcast to the entire states of Virginia, Maryland, Delaware, and Washington DC, the Pennsylvania counties of York, Harrisburg and Lancaster, the West Virginia counties of Grant, Hardy, Mineral, Hampshire, Morgan, Berkeley and Jefferson, and most of North Carolina excluding Asheville (which is in the Atlanta Braves' broadcast territory). Ravens games have been broadcast on WBAL and WIYY since the 2006 season.

Other teams whose games have been broadcast on WBAL include the Baltimore Colts, the University of Maryland Terrapins, and the Towson Tigers.

== History ==
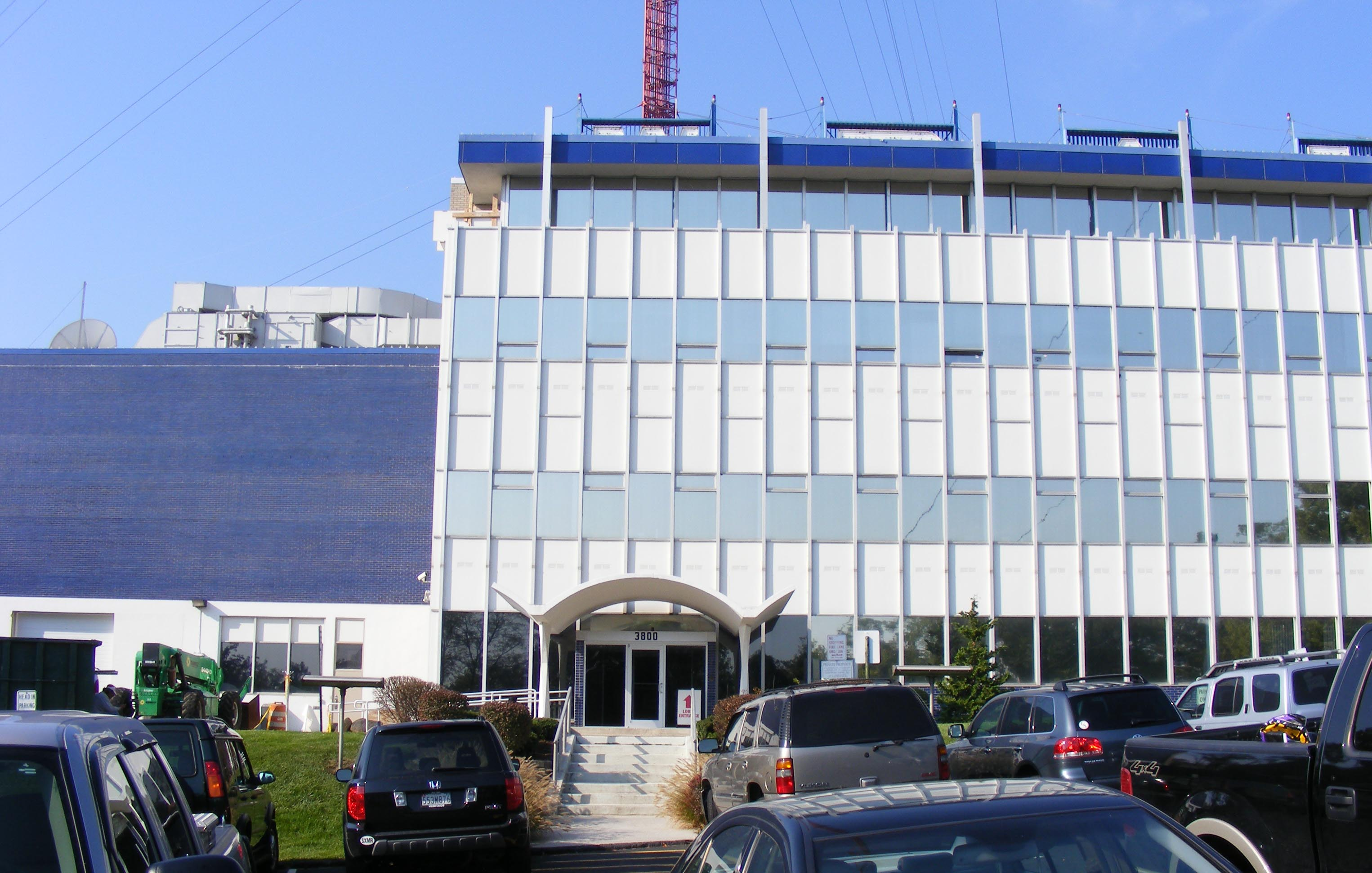
The WBAL Building, on Television Hill in Baltimore, has housed WBAL Radio since 1962.

=== Consolidated Gas Electric ===
WBAL began broadcasting after being dedicated on November 2, 1925. It was a subsidiary of the Consolidated Gas Electric Light and Power Company, a predecessor of Constellation Energy. The initial broadcasting studio was located at the utility's offices on Lexington Street. In the 1930s, WBAL became the flagship station for the international broadcast of radio evangelist G. E. Lowman, whose shows originated in Baltimore until 1959.

WBAL was an affiliate of NBC's Blue Network. On January 12, 1935, with radio becoming more commercialized, there was little justification for a public service company to own a radio station. WBAL was sold to the Hearst-controlled American Radio News Corporation, which operated it along with two daily newspapers, The Baltimore News-Post and The Baltimore American (later merged as the Baltimore News-American).

=== MOR and talk ===
As network programming moved from radio to television in the 1950s, WBAL switched to a full service, middle of the road (MOR) music format stressing personality, sports, and news. The station played a mix of pop standards with some softer songs from the Top 40.

By the early 1970s, the station had a full-service adult contemporary music format, except on weekday evenings, when it aired talk programming.

Among its personalities during that period were program host Jay Grayson, Harley Brinsfield, who had a long-running Saturday night jazz music program, The Harley Show, and White House-accredited newsman Galen Fromme. In the early 1980s, WBAL began running talk shows evenings and overnights, and continued to play some music during the day.

=== News-talk ===
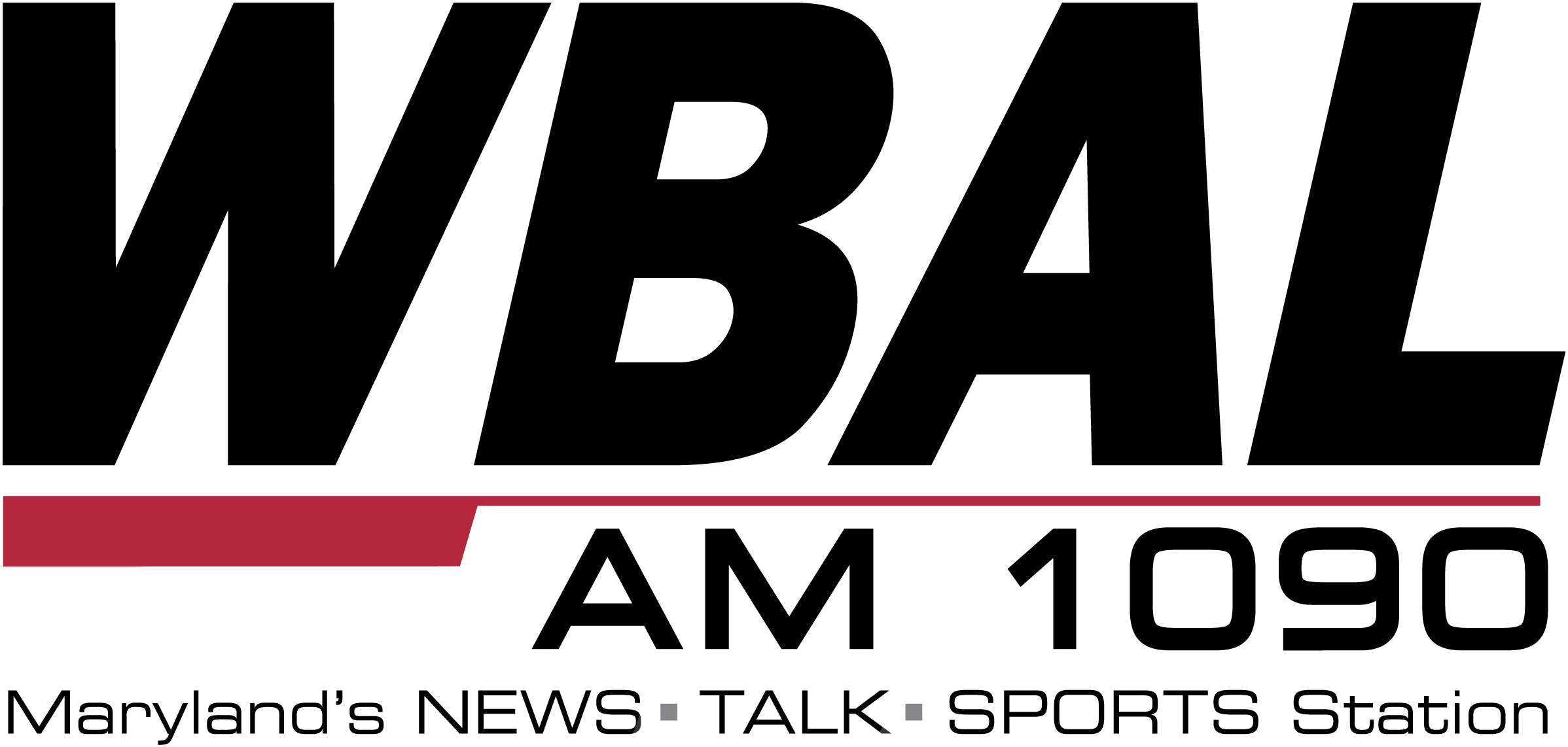
Former logo of the radio station

Music gradually decreased, and talk programs were added. In the fall of 1985, WBAL transitioned to its current news-talk format, winning 19 national Edward R. Murrow Awards since then, the most of any local U.S. radio station. Since the mid-1990s, the station has become increasingly conservative, both in its on-air personalities and its editorial direction.

In 2010, WBAL switched its morning and afternoon drive time shows to an all-news format, titled Maryland's Morning News and Afternoon News Journal respectively. The shows were renamed Maryland's News Now and later "WBAL News Now". The all-news blocks included national newscasts from ABC News every 30 minutes. Previously, the national feed had been provided by CBS at the top of each hour until 2014. Also in 2014, the station was rebranded as WBAL News Radio 1090 to better reflect its status as Maryland's radio news leader. By the 2020s, the news blocks had been scaled back, with talk shows taking their place.

As of 2026, the current weekday talk news show hosts consist of former Maryland state legislator Clarence Mitchell IV (C4), Bryan Nehman, T.J. Smith, and Angelette Aviles.

=== HD Radio and translator ===
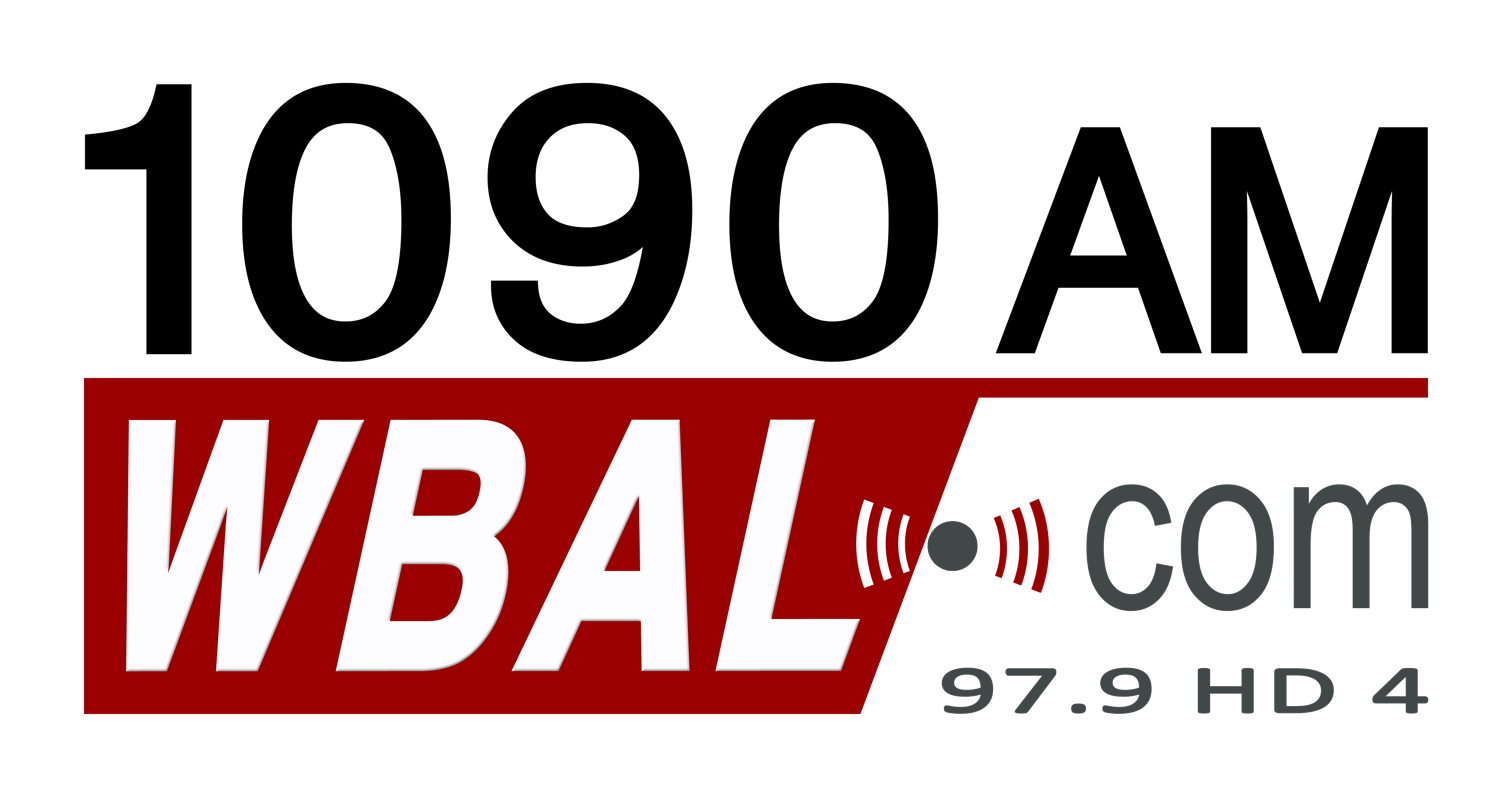
WBAL's previous logo

In addition to its analog 1090 kHz signal, WBAL is also heard on 97.9 WIYY-HD2. In 2021, the station added an FM translator at 101.5 MHz, W268BA so that the station could be heard on FM radios in and around Baltimore.

Broadcast translator for WBAL (AM)
| Call sign | Frequency | City of license | FID | ERP (W) | HAAT | Class | Transmitter coordinates | FCC info |
|---|---|---|---|---|---|---|---|---|
| W268BA | 101.5 FM | Baltimore, Maryland | 154255 | 136 | 190 m (623 ft) | D | 39°20′5″N 76°39′2″W | LMS |

=== Notable former on-air staff ===
- Allan Prell – Along with Smith, the leading voice of WBAL in the 1980s and 90s. Left the station in 1999, died in 2016.
- Dick Purtan – disc jockey and talk host, 1967-68. Originally from Buffalo, New York, he was in Detroit in 1965, then went to Baltimore for a year. Returned to Detroit in 1968, ended career there in 2010.
- Ron Smith – died, at the age of 70, on December 19, 2011, after a brief battle with pancreatic cancer.
- Art Wander – program director who developed WBAL's early 1960s MOR format. Wander left Baltimore by the time of the British Invasion, eventually returning to his hometown (also Buffalo) in the 1980s as a sports talk host. Wander died August 13, 2025, age 97.
