= WTMC =

Traffic radio station in Wilmington, Delaware

Coordinates: 39°42′00″N 75°36′29″W

- Wilmington, Delaware; United States
- Frequency: 1380 kHz

Programming
- Format: Traffic

Ownership
- Owner: Delaware Department of Transportation

History
- First air date: 1948
- Former call signs: WAMS (1948–2000)
- Call sign meaning: Transportation; Management; Center

Technical information
- Licensing authority: FCC
- Facility ID: 48381
- Class: D
- Power: 250 watts day 10 watts night
- Translator: 98.5 W253CQ (Wilmington)

Links
- Public license information: Public file; LMS
- Webcast: Listen Live
- Website: WTMC website

WTMC (1380 AM) is a non-commercial radio station. It also broadcasts on FM translator station W253CQ at 98.5 MHz. WTMC serves as a traffic advisory station, a service of the Delaware Department of Transportation (DelDOT) broadcasting in Wilmington, Delaware. There are signs posted around the Wilmington area advising motorists to tune to this station for traffic advisories. One such sign exists on U.S. Route 202 upon entry into Delaware from Pennsylvania. The service was started in 2000, when DelDOT purchased the license.

WTMC is licensed as a conventional broadcasting station, not a travelers' information station, although the state has added synchronized repeater stations downstate on AM 1380 which are HAR/TIS stations, to extend the station's coverage. The HAR/TIS stations were provided by Information Station Specialists and comprise the largest network of HAR/TIS stations in the country - and the only one whose cardinal location is a former broadcast station, the former WAMS. Additional synchronized TIS/HAR repeaters are being added to the network.

== History ==
The 1380 frequency first signed on in 1948 as WAMS. It was owned by the Wilmington Tri-State Broadcasting Company because its signal also extended into New Jersey and Pennsylvania. It was a network affiliate of the Mutual Broadcasting System, carrying its dramas, comedies, news and sports. An advertisement in the 1949 Broadcasting Yearbook said WAMS was "Delaware's home owned and operated station." The station originally was powered at 1,000 watts, day and night. WAMS also had an FM station, 96.1 MHz WAMS-FM, powered at 20,000 watts and simulcasting its AM sister station. (The 96.1 frequency is now broadcasting in Allentown, Pennsylvania, as WCTO.)

In the 1960s and 70s, WAMS was a popular Top 40 hit music station but also at various times was a country music station and adult contemporary outlet. It was later powered at 5,000 watts by day and 1,000 watts at night. Due to financial problems, the station went dark in 1986. Its original transmitter site was sold, due to the value of the land on which it had been located. AM 1380 stayed off the air until DelDOT purchased the license for its travelers information service.

== Translators ==
Call sign	Frequency	City of license	FID	ERP (W)	HAAT	Class	FCC info
W253CQ	98.5 FM	Wilmington, Delaware	201388	100	55 m (180 ft)	D	LMS
