= WDEL =

WDEL may refer to:

- WDEL (AM), a radio station (1150 AM) licensed to serve Wilmington, Delaware, United States
- WDEL-FM, a radio station (101.7 FM) licensed to serve Canton, New Jersey, United States
- WSTW, a radio station (93.7 FM) licensed to serve Wilmington, Delaware, which held the call sign WDEL-FM from 1950 to 1969
- WVUE (Delaware), a defunct television station (channel 12) formerly licensed to serve Wilmington, Delaware, which held the call sign WDEL-TV from 1949 to 1955
