= WTRI =

- Brunswick, Maryland; United States
- Broadcast area: Southern Frederick County, Maryland; Northern Loudoun County, Virginia
- Frequency: 1520 kHz

Programming
- Format: Bollywood music

Ownership
- Owner: Hasmukh Shah; (1520 Radio Asia LLC)

History
- First air date: October 15, 1966
- Last air date: September 22, 2023
- Call sign meaning: "Tri-State"

Technical information
- Licensing authority: FCC
- Facility ID: 67755
- Class: D
- Power: 17,000 watts daytime only
- Transmitter coordinates: 39°18′41.4″N 77°36′25″W
- Translator: 101.7 W269DH (Leesburg)

Links
- Public license information: Public file; LMS

WTRI (1520 kHz) was a commercial AM radio station licensed to Brunswick, Maryland, which served Frederick County, Maryland and Loudoun County, Virginia. WTRI was last owned by Hasmukh Shah and aired a South Asian format of Bollywood music and talk in Hindi and Punjabi.

WTRI's tower and studio were formerly located off of 13th Avenue in Brunswick. It went silent on September 22, 2023, after that land was sold to the city government to expand a neighboring park. As it did not resume operations in one year, its license was forfeited pursuant to the Telecommunications Act of 1996. The license was formally cancelled by the FCC on April 9, 2025. Programming was also heard on an FM translator station, 101.7 W269DH in Leesburg, Virginia.

== History ==
=== Early history ===
WTRI first signed on the air on October 15, 1966. The original owner was Frank Manthos and George Gillespie's Elektra Broadcasting Corporation. It aired country music with local news coverage and originally signed on with 250 watts. Soon after sign-on, power was upgraded to 500 watts. In 1973, the pair sold to Charles "Bert" Thornton.

WTRI was a daytimer required to sign off near sunset in order to clear 1520 AM for WWKB in Buffalo, New York. A notable incident occurred because of this limitation in March 1977, when the Brunswick High School boys' basketball team reached the state championship game for the first time in thirty years. However, the game was to be played at 6 p.m. at the University of Maryland, College Park, and at that time of year WTRI was required to sign off at 6:15 p.m. Charles Thornton Jr., Bert's son and the station's manager, attempted to secure permission from the Federal Communications Commission (FCC) to stay on the air for the game, but was flatly told it was impossible as it would violate the 1941 North American Regional Broadcasting Agreement which internationally standardized nighttime operation. Bert Thornton had the idea to broadcast the game via closed-circuit radio instead. A local car dealership cleared out its showroom to use as a makeshift auditorium, the game was broadcast over its public address system, and the team won the championship.

For its first two decades of operation, WTRI refused to accept advertising containing political or religious content. This allegedly prompted atheist activist Madalyn Murray O'Hair to threaten the station with a lawsuit for not accepting her ads.

=== LaRouche movement ties ===
WTRI was sold to the Virginia Electra Association in February 1986, as Bert Thornton had purchased WEPM and WESM in Martinsburg, West Virginia in 1978 and was increasingly occupied by those stations. This stoked controversy as one of the corporation's owners, Allen Salisbury, had ties to the LaRouche movement based in nearby Leesburg, Virginia. The new ownership pledged not to change the station's programming, though it ended the policy of not airing political content. They imported Bill Maniaci, a successful talk host at KGU in Honolulu, to run the station. Shortly after the sale closed, Charles Zimmerman, an elderly former Bethlehem Steel executive who was the principal shareholder in the corporation, filed a lawsuit alleging that LaRouche supporters had taken advantage of his failing memory and unduly influenced him to contribute $200,000 that was used to buy the station.

After the Federal Bureau of Investigation raided the movement's headquarters in Leesburg on suspicion of credit-card fraud later in 1986, the station began broadcasting controversial LaRouche-inspired news, political and conspiratorial content. As the Washington Post described it, along with the country music came warnings of "dire conspiracies, murderous plots against local residents, and traitors in their midst." Maniaci quit at the end of the year, calling the LaRouche content "distasteful" in his resignation letter and criticizing an oppressive and secretive environment at the station. He claimed that Salisbury acted as the de facto manager, surveilled him and prevented him from making any consequential decisions, and that news items were regularly censored to remove negative references to LaRouche supporters. Salisbury refused to answer any questions from the Post unless the interview was broadcast live over the station, which the paper found unacceptable. For their part, local residents were also angered by the content, and businesses pulled their advertising. The Brunswick volunteer fire department, who had a long-standing tradition of running the station for a day as a fundraiser, refused to work with the new ownership. The station went bankrupt in 1991.

=== Later local ownership ===
WTRI was sold at bankruptcy auction to Liz Roberts, a former BBC and NPR reporter, who changed the format to an eclectic variety of music exclusively by local talent. The station had a policy of giving airtime at least once to every musical group in the area who either performed live or submitted a recording. Roberts also created a show for local fiction writers, the first episode of which was picked up by NPR for national distribution. Roberts sold to Capital Broadcasting Corporation of Annapolis, Maryland in 1997. Capital upgraded WTRI's equipment and increased its power to 9.3 kilowatts, limited to 1.4 kW during critical hours. Programming switched to Spanish-language pop music branded "Alpha 1520" to target the larger area's growing Latino population.

In October 2000, WTRI dropped all Spanish-language programming with no notice and switched to automated beautiful music, later going silent entirely. It was sold to JMK Communications of Los Angeles and returned to the air in January 2001 with Korean-language talk in simulcast with WKDV and WPWC, both based in Prince William County, Virginia. In 2003, JMK increased power to 17 kW, with directional nulls toward WWKB and KOKC eliminating the need for a power reduction during critical hours.

In March 2005, WTRI was sold to local residents Buddy Rizer, Marty Sheehan, and Taylor Walsh, who spent weeks repairing the station's dilapidated studio building. They instituted a locally programmed adult standards format branded "Vegas Radio". The station also picked up daytime Washington Nationals and Frederick Keys games, as well as Navy Midshipmen football. Negotiations with the FCC and WWKB to allow some form of nighttime operation at this time were not successful.

On October 1, 2007, WTRI abruptly flipped to brokered Spanish language programming. Rizer and Sheehan retained ownership of the station, but described the local marketing agreement as "an offer we couldn't refuse". They flipped again to locally programmed classic country, branded "Radio Earl", on April 7, 2009. "Radio Earl" was dropped on January 4, 2010, when the station flipped again to a simulcast of news-talk programming from WTHU in Thurmont, Maryland. This simulcasting ended in September 2010, with a flip back to Spanish music as "Radio La Grande 1520".

On May 18, 2011, WTRI began carrying the "KHZ Network" with eclectic pop music also carried on Maryland stations WKHZ, WYRE and WAMD.

=== Bankruptcy and FM ===
In May 2012, WTRI began relaying "Radio Asia", which was once again Korean-language programming. On March 31, 2014, the FCC fined the station $5,000 for repeatedly going silent during 2009, 2011 and early 2012 without permission. Rizer and Sheehan blamed mounting financial issues. A complaint seeking to deny renewal of its license outright was dismissed. The station went bankrupt soon afterward, and on April 14 a court order placed it in receivership to be sold.

It was purchased in May 2015 by Hasmukh Shah, the owner of WXMC in Parsippany, New Jersey, for $275,000 plus all costs necessary to resume operation. Also called Radio Asia and later "Radio Chai", Shah programmed a variety of Filmi and Bollywood music, along with talk in Hindi and Punjabi. In 2016, Shah purchased an FM translator construction permit from Priority Radio, owner of WXHL-FM in Christiana, Delaware, for $65,000. It was moved to Leesburg and on the air as W269DH in late 2017, with a tower located south of the town.

=== End of operations ===
WTRI broadcast for the last time on September 22, 2023, after the land housing its studio and transmitter site was sold to the city of Brunswick to expand a neighboring park. Pursuant to the Telecommunications Act of 1996, it had one year to resume operations or its license would be cancelled. At the time, Shah told the FCC he was looking for a buyer for both WTRI and W269DH. With the loss of its originating station, W269DH was required to go silent as well. It returned to the air on September 13, 2024, to keep its license active, rebroadcasting WPIR instead; Shah retained ownership of that facility. However, WTRI did not resume broadcasting by the statutory deadline of 12:01 a.m. on September 23, 2024, and its license was forfeited. The license was formally cancelled by the FCC on April 9, 2025.

== Translator ==
In addition to the main station, WTRI was relayed by one translator.

| Call sign | Frequency | City of license | FID | ERP (W) | HAAT | Class | FCC info |
|---|---|---|---|---|---|---|---|
| W269DH | 101.7 FM | Leesburg, Virginia | 141387 | 220 | 54 m (177 ft) | D | LMS |
