= WXCY =

WXCY may refer to:

- WXCY-FM, a radio station (103.7 FM) licensed to serve Havre de Grace, Maryland, United States
- WOCQ (AM), a radio station (1510 AM) licensed to serve Salem, New Jersey, United States, which held the call sign WXCY from 2021 to 2023
