= Delmarva Broadcasting Company =

American radio broadcasting company

- Type: Private
- Industry: Radio broadcasting
- Headquarters: Wilmington, Delaware, United States
- Area served: Maryland, Delaware, New Jersey, Pennsylvania
- Parent: Steinman Enterprises (until 2019); Forever Media Inc. (2019–present)

Delmarva Broadcasting Company was a privately owned radio company, which operated radio stations in Maryland, Delaware and New Jersey. It was a wholly owned asset of the Steinman family of Lancaster, Pennsylvania. Steinman Enterprises also operates numerous other companies, including Lancaster Newspapers, Inc., Lancaster Newspapers and Intelligencer Printing, as well as farming and coal mines.

Headquartered in Wilmington, Delaware, Delmarva Broadcasting Company owned 10 radio stations in four markets.

On October 10, 2008 Delmarva Broadcasting joined Radiolicious and began streaming on the iPhone and iPod Touch.

On February 5, 2019, Forever Media announced its intent to acquire Delmarva Broadcasting and its 10 stations for $18.5 million. This sale was completed on May 20, 2019.

== Stations ==
Branding	Callsign	Frequency	Power	Location
Jammin' 96.9	WVJJ	1510 kHz	2.5 kW (day)	Salem, New Jersey
WDEL	WDEL-FM	101.7 MHz	3.3 kW	Canton, New Jersey
WDEL	WDEL-AM	1150 kHz	5 kW	Wilmington, Delaware
93.7 WSTW	WSTW	93.7 MHz	47 kW	Wilmington, Delaware
Delaware 105.9	WXDE	105.9 MHz	6 kW	Lewes, Delaware
Eagle 97.7	WAFL	97.7 MHz	3 kW	Milford, Delaware
The Chicken 101.3	WCHK-FM	101.3 MHz	3 kW	Milford, Delaware
Cool 102.1/930	WNCL	930 kHz	500 watts (day); 81 watts (night)	Milford, Delaware
97.1 The Wave	WAVD	97.1 MHz	4.6 kW	Ocean Pines, Maryland
103.7 WXCY	WXCY	103.7 MHz	37 kW	Havre De Grace, Maryland
