= Kraeutler =

Kraeutler is a surname. Notable people with the surname include:

- Émile Kraeutler (born 1866), French-German auto racing driver
- Joseph Kraeutler (born 1977), former head of the Photographs Department at Phillips de Pury
- Tom Kraeutler (1959 or 1960–2025), American home improvement authority, author and broadcast journalist
