= WHGM =

Radio station in Havre De Grace, Maryland

Simulcasts WAMD Aberdeen
- Havre de Grace, Maryland; United States
- Broadcast area: Northeastern Maryland
- Frequency: 1330 kHz
- Branding: 970 & 1330 WAMD

Programming
- Language: English
- Format: Adult hits

Ownership
- Owner: Andrulonis Media; (Sweet Tea Radio, LLC)
- Sister stations: WAMD

History
- First air date: May 15, 1948
- Former call signs: WASA (1948–2000); WJSS (2000–2014)
- Call sign meaning: Havre De Grace, Maryland

Technical information
- Licensing authority: FCC
- Facility ID: 35120
- Class: D
- Power: 1,000 watts (day); 18 watts (night)
- Transmitter coordinates: 39°33′56.7″N 76°7′7.9″W
- Translator: See § Translator

Links
- Public license information: Public file; LMS

WHGM (1330 AM) is a commercial radio station licensed to Havre De Grace, Maryland, United States. It is owned by Steve Clendenin, through licensee Maryland Media One, LLC, and airs an adult hits format. Studios are in the Arts & Entertainment District of Havre De Grace at 331 North Union Avenue.

Programming is also heard on one FM translator: W261EE at 100.1 MHz in Chesapeake City.

== History ==
The station began broadcasting on May 15, 1948. Its original call sign was WASA. It was owned by Jason & Virginia Pate of Havre de Grace. After World War II, Jason Pate applied for the first radio license in Havre de Grace. WASA added an FM station, 103.7 WHDG, in 1960, now WXCY-FM. The FM station was later sold to the Delmarva Broadcasting Company.

Long-time Baltimore television personality Royal Parker began his broadcasting career on WASA in the 1940s, hosting a music program called the Royal Record Review. In 2000, the station's call letters were changed to WJSS. In 2014, they switched to WHGM.

On June 6, 2016, WHGM changed its format to adult hits, branded as "Smash Hits WHGM".

In late 2018 or early 2019, WHGM rebranded as "WHGM Gold", switching to an oldies-classic hits format. It played the top songs from the 1960s, 1970s and 1980s.

In 2024, the station briefly signed off the air as it planned on transferring the station to Sweet Tea Radio (an apparent subsidiary of Andrulonis Media, whose co-owner Christy Andrulonis goes by the on-air name "Sweet Tea" and which has traded stations back and forth with Maryland Media One several times), a company that plans on relocating the station.

== Translators ==
Broadcast translator for WHGM
Call sign	Frequency	City of license	FID	ERP (W)	HAAT	Class	Transmitter coordinates	FCC info
W261EE	100.1 FM	Chesapeake City, Maryland	154145	20	0 m (0 ft)	D	39°35′31.0″N 75°56′40.0″W	LMS
