= WFAI =

WFAI can refer to:

- Women's Football Association of Ireland
- WOCQ (AM), a radio station (1510 AM) licensed to serve Salem, New Jersey, United States, which held the call sign WFAI from 2001 to 2019
- WFAY, an AM radio station located in Fayetteville, North Carolina, formerly known as WFAI
