= WKTT =

WKTT could refer to:

- WKTT (FM), a radio station (97.5 FM) licensed to serve Salisbury, Maryland, United States
- WLKN, a radio station in Cleveland, Wisconsin which used the WKTT calls from 1984 to 2003
- WKTT, a fictional talk radio station in Grand Theft Auto IV
