= WQJZ =

WQJZ may refer to:

- WQJZ-LP, a low-power radio station (103.9 FM) licensed to serve Murfreesboro, Tennessee, United States
- WAVD, a radio station (97.1 FM) licensed to serve Ocean Pines, Maryland, United States, which held the call sign WQJZ from 1998 to 2011
