= WAMD =

WAMD may refer to:

- WAMD (AM), a radio station (970 AM) licensed to Aberdeen, Maryland, United States
- WAMD (Minneapolis), a defunct radio station in Minneapolis, Minnesota, United States
