= WJKS =

WJKS may refer to:

- WJKS (FM), a radio station (104.3 FM) licensed to serve Keeseville, New York, United States
- WDEL-FM, a radio station (101.7 FM) licensed to serve Canton, New Jersey, United States, which held the call sign WJKS from 1997 to 2015
- WCWJ, a television station (channel 34, virtual 17) licensed to serve Jacksonville, Florida, United States, which held the call sign WJKS-TV or WJKS from 1966 to 1997
