= Home improvement =

Process of renovating or making additions to one's home

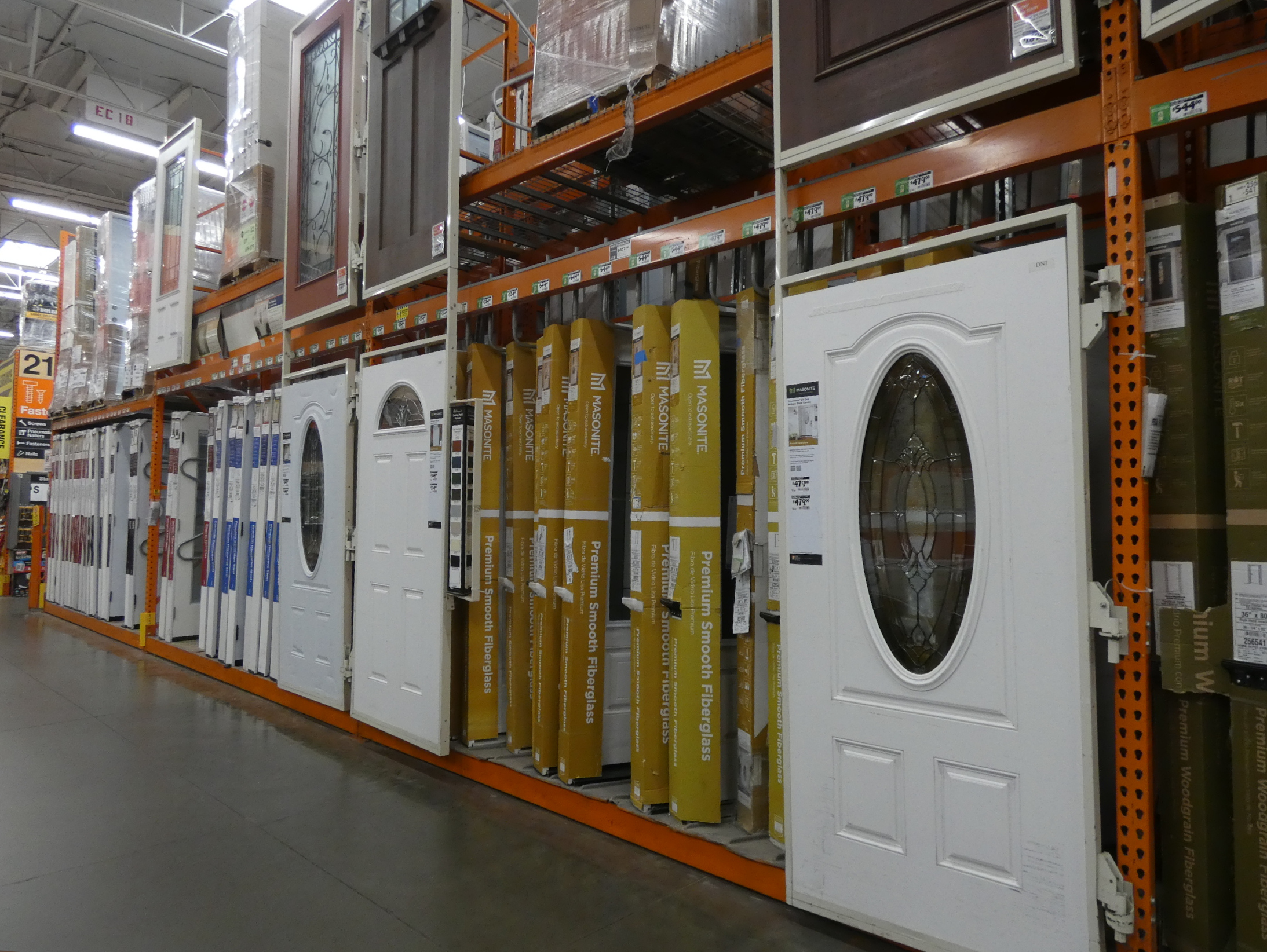
Merchandise on display in a hardware store

Home improvement is the process of renovating, improving or adding to one's home. Home improvement can consist of projects that upgrade an existing home interior (such as electrical and plumbing), exterior (masonry, concrete, siding, roofing) or other improvements to the property (i.e. garden work or garage maintenance/additions). Home improvement projects can be carried out for a number of different reasons: personal preference and comfort, maintenance or repair work, making a home bigger by adding rooms/spaces, as a means of saving energy, or to improve safety.

== Types of home improvement ==
While "home improvement" often refers to building projects that alter the structure of an existing home, it can also include improvements to lawns, gardens, and outdoor structures, such as gazebos and garages. It also encompasses maintenance, repair, and general servicing tasks. Home improvement projects generally have one or more of the following goals:

=== Comfort ===
- Upgrading heating, ventilation and air conditioning systems (HVAC).
- Upgrading rooms with luxuries, such as adding gourmet features to a kitchen or a hot tub spa to a bathroom.
- Increasing the capacity of plumbing and electrical systems.
- Waterproofing basements.
- Soundproofing rooms, especially bedrooms and baths.

=== Maintenance and repair ===
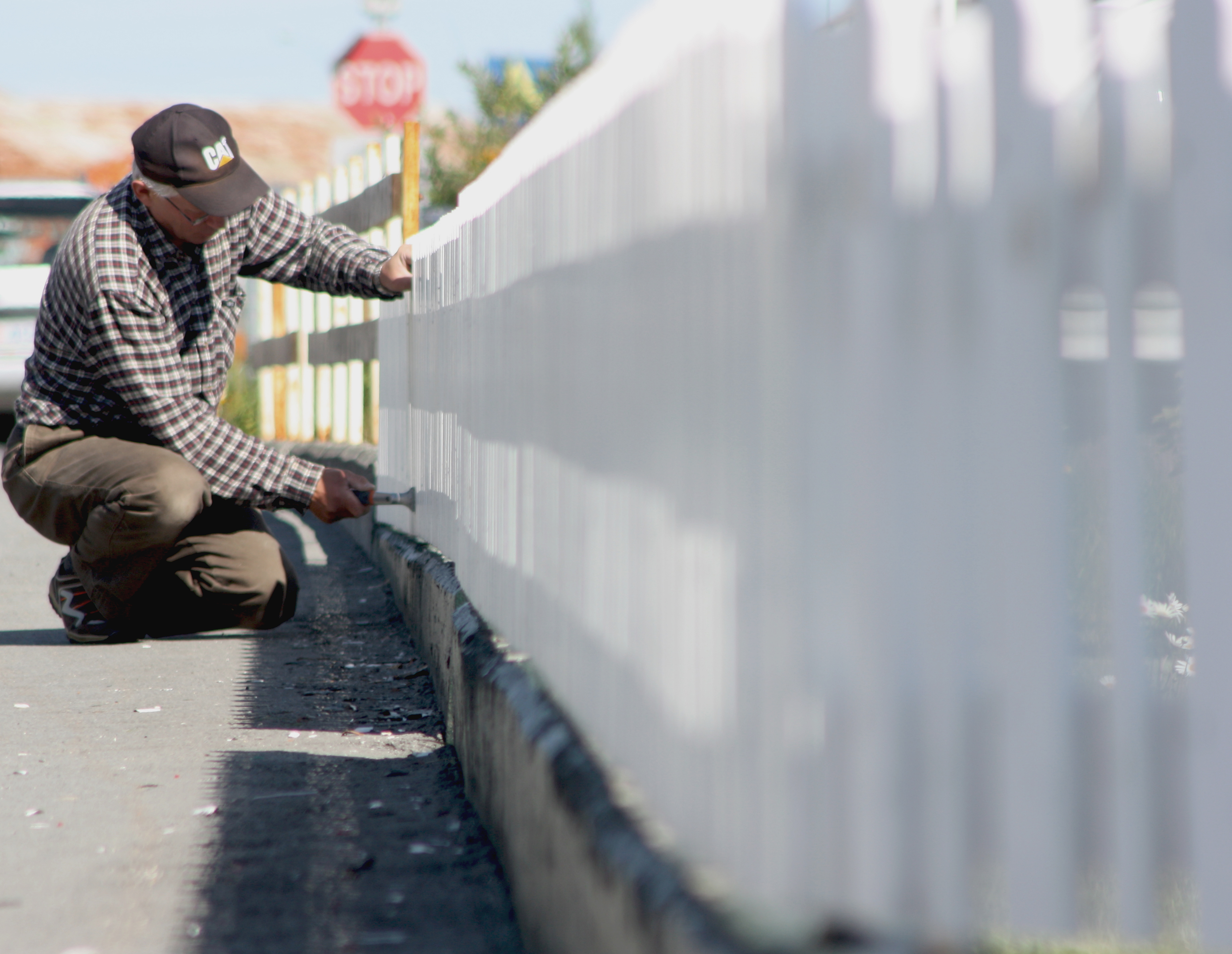
Man painting a fence

Maintenance projects can include:

- Roof tear-off and replacement.
- Replacement or new construction windows.
- Concrete and masonry repairs to the foundation and chimney.
- Repainting rooms, walls or fences
- Repairing plumbing and electrical systems
- Wallpapering
- Furniture polishing
- Plumbing, home interior and exterior works
- Shower maintenance

=== Additional space ===
Additional living space may be added by:

- Turning marginal areas into livable spaces such as turning basements into recrooms, home theaters, or home offices – or attics into spare bedrooms.
- Extending one's house with rooms added to the side of one's home or, sometimes, extra levels to the original roof. Such a new unit of construction is called an "add-on".

=== Saving energy ===
Homeowners may reduce utility costs with:

- Energy-efficient thermal insulation, replacement windows, and lighting.
- Renewable energy with biomass pellet stoves, wood-burning stoves, solar panels, wind turbines, programmable thermostats, and geothermal exchange heat pumps (see autonomous building).

=== Safety, emergency management, security and privacy ===
The need to be safer or for better privacy or emergency management can be fulfilled with diversified measures which can be improved, maintained or added. Secret compartments and passages can also be conceived for privacy and security.

- Interventions for fire protection and avoidance. Possible examples are fire sprinkler systems for automatic fire suppression, smoke detectors for fire detection, fire alarm systems, or passive fire protection (including some wildfire management strategies).
- Technical solutions to increase protection from natural disasters, or geotechnical and structural safety (e.g. hurricane or seismic retrofit).
- Interventions and additions to increase home safety from other hazards, like falls, electric injuries, gas leaks or home exposure to environmental health concerns.
- Physical security measures:
  - Access control systems and physical barriers, which can include fences, physical door and window security measures (e.g. grilles, laminated glass, window shutters), locks;
  - Security lighting, security alarms and video surveillance.
- Safes and vaults.
- Spaces for emergency evacuation, like emergency exits and rarer escape tunnels.
- Spaces which provide protection in the event of different emergencies: areas of refuge, storm cellars (as protection from tornadoes and other kinds of severe weather), panic rooms, bunkers and bomb shelters (including fallout shelters), etc.
- Home renovations or additions used to increase privacy can be as simple as curtains or much more advanced, such as some structural surveillance counter-measures. They may overlap with physical security measures.
- Public utility outage preparedness, like backup generators for providing power during power outages .

== Home improvement industry ==
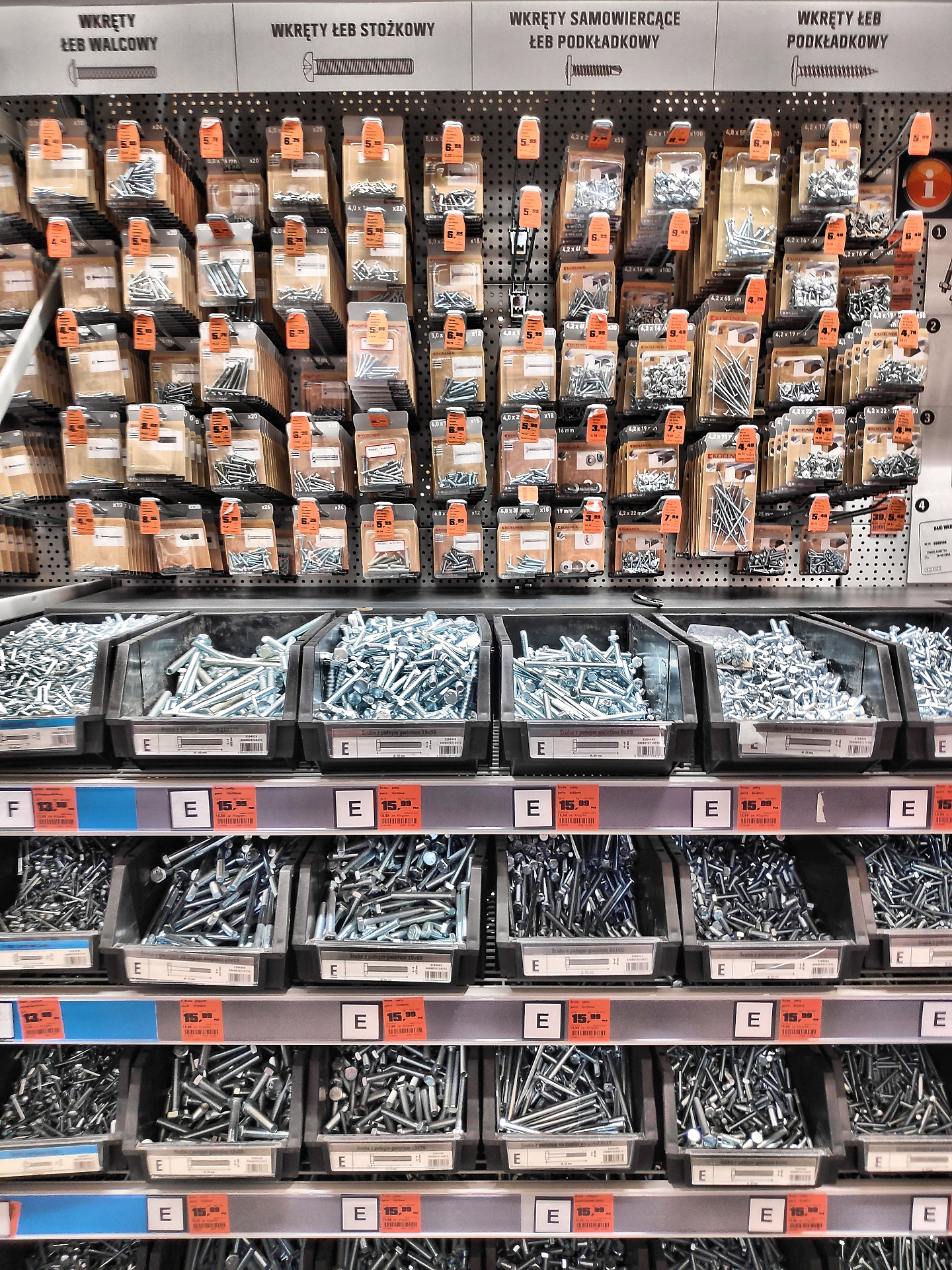
Screws and bolts in an OBI home improvement store in Poland

Home or residential renovation is an almost $300 billion industry in the United States, and a $48 billion industry in Canada. The average cost per project is $3,000 in the United States and $11,000–15,000 in Canada.

Professional home improvement is ancient and goes back to the beginning of recorded civilization. One example is Sergius Orata, who in the 1st century B.C. is said by the writer Vitruvius (in his famous book De architectura) to have invented the hypocaust. The hypocaust is an underfloor heating system that was used throughout the Roman Empire in villas of the wealthy. He is said to have become wealthy himself by buying villas at a low price, adding spas and his newly invented hypocaust, and reselling them at higher prices.

=== Renovation contractors ===
Perhaps the most important or visible professionals in the renovation industry are renovation contractors or skilled trades. These are the builders that have specialized credentials, licensing and experience to perform renovation services in specific municipalities.

While there is a fairly large "grey market" of unlicensed companies, there are those that have membership in a reputable association and/or are accredited by a professional organization. Homeowners are recommended to perform checks such as verifying license and insurance and checking business references prior to hiring a contractor to work on their house.

Lifestyle publications often provide guidance for homeowners on budget-conscious upgrades, emphasizing strategies to refresh living spaces quickly and affordably.

Because interior renovation will touch the change of the internal structure of the house, ceiling construction, circuit configuration and partition walls, etc., such work related to the structure of the house, of course, also includes renovation of wallpaper posting, furniture settings, lighting, etc.

=== Aggregators ===
Aggregators are companies that bundle home improvement service offers and act as intermediary agency between service providers and customers.

== In popular culture ==
Home improvement was popularized on television in 1979 with the premiere of This Old House starring Bob Vila on PBS. American cable channel HGTV features many do-it-yourself shows, as does sister channel DIY Network. Danny Lipford hosts and produces the nationally syndicated Today's Homeowner with Danny Lipford. Tom Kraeutler and Leslie Segrete co-host the nationally syndicated The Money Pit Home Improvement Radio Show.

Movies that poked fun at the difficulties involved include: Mr. Blandings Builds His Dream House (1948), starring Cary Grant and Myrna Loy; George Washington Slept Here (1942), featuring Jack Benny and Ann Sheridan; and The Money Pit (1986), with Tom Hanks and Shelley Long. The sitcom Home Improvement used the home improvement theme for comedic purposes.

== See also ==
- Home repair
- Housekeeping
- Maintenance, repair and operations
