= WOCQ =

WOCQ may refer to:

- WOCQ (AM), a radio station (1510 AM) licensed to serve Salem, New Jersey, United States
- WRDE-FM, a radio station (103.9 FM) licensed to serve Berlin, Maryland, United States, which held the call sign WOCQ from 1981 to 2022
