= WBWD =

WBWD may refer to:

- WBWD (AM), a radio station (540 AM) licensed to Islip, New York, United States
- WBWD, a cable television channel in Greenville, Mississippi, United States, part of The CW Plus
