= WXDE =

Radio station in Lewes, Delaware

- Lewes, Delaware; United States
- Broadcast area: Ocean City, Maryland
- Frequency: 105.9 MHz
- Branding: Delaware 105.9

Programming
- Format: News/talk
- Affiliations: CBS News Radio; Compass Media Networks; Premiere Networks; Radio America; Salem Radio Network; Townhall News; Westwood One; Baltimore Orioles Radio Network

Ownership
- Owner: Forever Media (sale to Draper Media pending); (FM Radio Licenses, LLC)
- Sister stations: WAFL; WAVD; WCHK-FM; WNCL

History
- First air date: 1992
- Former call signs: WXJN (1990–2009); WZKT (2009–2012)

Technical information
- Licensing authority: FCC
- Facility ID: 53487
- Class: A
- ERP: 6,000 watts
- HAAT: 100 meters (330 ft)
- Transmitter coordinates: 38°38′36″N 75°13′0″W

Links
- Public license information: Public file; LMS
- Webcast: Listen Live
- Website: delaware1059.com

WXDE (105.9 FM, "Delaware 105.9") is a radio station licensed to serve Lewes, Delaware, United States, also serving Ocean City, Maryland to the south. The station, which began broadcasting in 1992, is currently owned by Forever Media. WXDE airs a news/talk format, and is the area's affiliate for the Baltimore Orioles Radio Network.

== History ==
This station received its original construction permit from the Federal Communications Commission on May 10, 1990. The new station was assigned the callsign WXJN by the FCC on July 12, 1990.

With construction essentially complete, permit holder Susan Marie Beth Romaine applied to the FCC in June 1992 to transfer that permit to Prettyman Broadcasting Company. The transfer was approved by the FCC on July 28, 1992, and the transaction was consummated on August 14, 1992. After one minor modification and an extension for time, WXJN received its license to cover from the FCC on December 21, 1992.

In May 1997, Prettyman Broadcasting Company reached an agreement to sell this station to Delmarva Broadcasting Company. The deal was approved by the FCC on June 26, 1997, and the transaction was consummated on August 28, 1997.

The station, previously licensed as WXJN, was assigned the call sign WZKT by the FCC on March 31, 2009.

On September 4, 2012, WZKT split its simulcast of WKTT and became a News/Talk station as "Delaware 105.9." The station also changed its call sign to WXDE.

Forever Media bought Delmarva Broadcasting in February 2019 for $18.5 million. By the end of the year, Forever had fired mid-day host Susan Monday and afternoon host Rob Sussman. Mid-day host Ed Tyll resigned from his position on the first day of Forever Media's ownership.

In July 2026, it was announced that Forever Media would sell its Dover cluster, including WXDE, to Draper Media for $2.5 million.
