= Lynn Samuels =

American radio personality (1942–2011)

- Born: September 2, 1942; Niagara Falls, New York, U.S.
- Died: December 24, 2011 (aged 69); Woodside, New York, U.S.
- Occupation: American radio personality

Lynn Margaret Samuels (September 2, 1942 – December 24, 2011) was an American radio personality and blogger based in New York City. She was one of the first women to host a political radio show.

== Career ==
She began her radio career at WBAI in 1979, where in addition to her on-air work, she was music director and an engineer and producer. Walter Sabo, in a tribute on the Alex Bennett program (hosted by Richard Bey) on December 27, 2011, stated that Lynn first worked for WOR on Saturdays from 4–6 p.m. "for quite some time".

Samuels was heard on WABC from 1987 until 1992, 1993 until 1997, and 1997 until 2002, including two breaks in which she was fired and then rehired. Her third and final dismissal in 2002 was allegedly due to budget cuts.

Samuels was also a call-screener for Matt Drudge. In 2002, she joined WLIE for a brief time before being hired by Sirius in 2003.

From 2003 to 2011, Samuels hosted The Lynn Samuels Show initially from 10:00 a.m. to 1:00 p.m. Monday through Friday. Later her time slot was moved to 1:00 p.m. to 3:00 p.m. ET on the Sirius Satellite Radio channel SIRIUS Left. Her show was also reduced from three hours to two. Early in 2011, after SIRIUS Left was folded into Sirius XM Left, her show was moved to the weekend on Sirius XM Stars from 10:00 a.m. to 1:00 p.m. She also made television appearances on FOX News, CNN, MSNBC, The Sally Jesse Raphael Show, Geraldo at Large and Politically Incorrect.

== Personal ==
She attended Bard College.

== Death ==
At age sixty-nine, Samuels died from a heart attack, apparently in the morning hours of December 24, 2011, in her New York City apartment. Her body was found by police when coworkers became alarmed by her absence after corresponding with her via e-mail the night before. She was survived by her sister Judy and two nephews. She is buried in Linden Hill Jewish Cemetery in Ridgewood, Queens, N.Y.
