= WCHK-FM =

Radio station in Milford, Delaware

- Milford, Delaware; United States
- Broadcast area: Dover
- Frequency: 101.3 MHz
- Branding: The Chicken 101.3

Programming
- Format: Country
- Affiliations: Westwood One

Ownership
- Owner: Forever Media (sale to Draper Media pending); (FM Radio Licenses, LLC)
- Sister stations: WAFL; WAVD; WNCL; WXDE

History
- First air date: 1990
- Former call signs: WXPZ (1990–2004); WNCL (2004–2019)
- Call sign meaning: CHicKen

Technical information
- Licensing authority: FCC
- Facility ID: 58763
- Class: A
- ERP: 6,000 watts
- HAAT: 93.5 meters (306.8 feet)
- Transmitter coordinates: 38°51′22.1″N 75°28′57.8″W

Links
- Public license information: Public file; LMS
- Webcast: Listen live
- Website: www.foreverdelmarva.com/thechicken1013/

WCHK-FM (101.3 FM, "The Chicken 101.3") is a radio station licensed to Milford, Delaware. Owned by Forever Media, it broadcasts a country music format serving Dover.

== History ==
The station began its operations in 1990 as WXPZ. It aired a Christian radio format under the brand The Light FM.

On January 6, 2004, WXPZ changed its callsign to WNCL. Initially, it aired an Oldies format under the brand Cool 101.3. Years later, it shifted to Classic Hits.

On February 5, 2019, Delmarva Broadcasting was sold to Forever Media.

In late-October 2019, the station began stunting with a loop of the "Chicken Dance", and its Cool format and branding was moved to sister station WYUS. On November 1, 2019, the station officially flipped to country music as The Chicken 101.3. The branding is a nod to Delaware's poultry industry, and the station's airstaff use chicken-themed pseudonyms on-air, such as "The Rooster" and "Chickie" (in a similar manner to Froggy, a country music brand used extensively by Forever Media's other country stations). The station changed its calls to WCHK-FM to match the new branding (with the WNCL calls moving to WYUS). This makes Deleware the only Forever-media cluster that does not use “Froggy.”

In July 2026, it was announced that Forever Media would sell its Dover cluster, including WCHK-FM, to Draper Media for $2.5 million.
