= WDEL (AM) =

Radio station in Wilmington, Delaware

- Wilmington, Delaware; United States
- Frequency: 1150 kHz
- Branding: 1150 AM 101.7 FM WDEL

Programming
- Format: News/talk
- Affiliations: ABC News Radio; Westwood One Sports; Philadelphia Eagles Radio Network; Philadelphia Phillies Radio Network; VSiN

Ownership
- Owner: Draper Holdings Business Trust; (WBOC, Inc.)
- Sister stations: WDEL-FM; WSTW; WXCY-FM

History
- First air date: July 22, 1922
- Former call signs: WHAV (1922–1926)
- Call sign meaning: Delaware

Technical information
- Licensing authority: FCC
- Facility ID: 16458
- Class: B
- Power: 5,000 watts
- Transmitter coordinates: 39°48′57.4″N 75°31′46.7″W
- Repeater: See § Simulcast

Links
- Public license information: Public file; LMS
- Webcast: Listen live
- Website: www.wdel.com

WDEL (1150 kHz) is a commercial radio station in Wilmington, Delaware, United States. It simulcasts a news/talk radio format with WDEL-FM 101.7. They are owned by Draper Holdings Business Trust with the license held by WBOC, Inc.

WDEL broadcasts with 5,000 watts around the clock. To protect other stations on 1150 AM from interference, WDEL uses a directional antenna with a four-tower array. The transmitter, studios and offices located on Shipley Road in Wilmington.

== History ==
=== Early years ===
WDEL was first licensed in July 1922. It was owned by the Wilmington Electrical Specialty Company, and was initially issued the sequentially assigned call sign WHAV. It made its debut broadcast on July 22 as one of the earliest broadcasting stations licensed in the United States, and the first in the state of Delaware. In 1926 the call sign were changed to WDEL. Founded by Willard S. Wilson, the station was originally a 250-watt station, but by the late 1940s, it had been granted an increase to its current power of 5,000 watts.

WDEL was later owned by the Delmarva Broadcasting Company, a subsidiary of Steinman Enterprises, a family-owned newspaper, broadcasting and mining company, based in Lancaster, Pennsylvania. Delmarva owned WDEL for more than 80 years.

During the "Golden Age of Radio", WDEL was an affiliate of the NBC Red Network, carrying its dramas, comedies, sports, news, game shows, soap operas and big band broadcasts. For a time in the 1940s, WDEL was co-owned with another early AM station licensed to Wilmington, WILM. While WDEL carried NBC Red Network programs, WILM aired shows from the NBC Blue Network (later ABC) and the Mutual Broadcasting System.

=== Adding TV and FM stations ===
In 1949, WDEL signed on a TV station, WDEL-TV (channel 7). Because WDEL had been a long-time NBC radio affiliate, WDEL-TV became an NBC-TV network affiliate. It also carried programming from the DuMont Television Network. But it was limited in power due to its proximity to two other channel 7 stations in New York City and Washington, DC. It later moved to channel 12. The Steinman family sold channel 12 in 1955; the allocation eventually became WHYY-TV, the PBS station for Philadelphia, but still licensed to Wilmington.

In 1950, WDEL added an FM station, WDEL-FM 93.7. At first it simulcast the programming on the AM station. But by the late 1960s, it aired separate programming using the call sign WSTW.

=== Moving from music to talk ===
With the demise of old time network radio in the 1950s, WDEL adopted a full-service format, combining news, sports and middle of the road music.

In the mid-1980s, WDEL was the first Wilmington radio station to provide traffic reports. WDEL's "TrafficWatch on the 9s" remains on the air today.

In the mid-1990s, WDEL moved to a news/talk format, eliminating music. The station aired a local call-in and information show in the morning, plus various nationally syndicated programs during the day including Dr. Laura, Rush Limbaugh, Mitch Albom and Sean Hannity.

In 2006, WDEL's main competitor, WILM, was bought by Clear Channel Communications. Because Limbaugh and Hannity were syndicated by Premiere Networks, a Clear Channel subsidiary, those shows moved over to WILM. As a result, WDEL adopted a weekday schedule of mostly "live and local" news and talk, only running syndicated programming in the evening and on weekends.

=== Changes in ownership ===
In 2015, Delmarva Broadcasting acquired WJKS (101.7 FM), licensed to Canton, New Jersey. Despite being based in New Jersey, the 101.7 signal covers parts of Northern Delaware, including sections of Wilmington. On April 1, WJKS flipped from urban adult contemporary music to a simulcast of WDEL, giving the station's listeners the option to hear it on AM or FM. The callsign was switched to WDEL-FM, returning that call sign to the air on 101.7 MHz. WDEL can also be heard on the HD2 subchannel of WSTW.

In early 2019, Steinman Communications announced that it was divesting its broadcast properties. All Delmarva Broadcasting stations were to be sold to Forever Media.

In June 2025, Forever Media sold six of its stations (including WDEL) to Draper Media for $11 million.

== Programming and sports ==
WDEL-AM-FM feature local talk and information shows on weekdays with nationally syndicated talk programs at night: The Ramsey Show with Dave Ramsey, Rich Valdés America at Night, Red Eye Radio and America in the Morning. On weekends, WDEL-AM-FM have specialty shows devoted to money, sports, real estate, home repair, gardening and travel, including some paid brokered programming. Syndicated shows on weekends includes The Money Pit, and Eye on Travel with Peter Greenberg, Jill on Money.

WDEL-AM-FM carry Philadelphia Phillies baseball and Philadelphia Eagles football. Additionally, WDEL-AM-FM air New Castle County high school football and basketball games. Sports betting shows from VSiN are heard on weekend nights.

== Awards ==
WDEL has won several prestigious Edward R. Murrow Awards from the Radio Television Digital News Association, including national awards in 2007 for Best Website and 2009 for Best Newscast. WDEL has also been named News Operation of the Year by the Chesapeake Associated Press Broadcasters Association numerous times.

In 2004, WDEL was awarded by the National Association of Broadcasters with its prestigious Crystal Award for public service.

In 2005, WDEL became one of the first radio stations in the nation to produce web-based news video for its website, WDEL.com.

In 2011, WDEL won a prestigious Marconi Award from the National Association of Broadcasters for "Medium Market Station of the Year."

In 2014, WDEL's news department won the RTDNA national Edward R. Murrow Award for "Overall Excellence." WDEL also won RTDNA's national Murrow Award for "Best Newscast" that year. In 2016, WDEL again won the Murrow Award for "Overall Excellence."

== Simulcast ==
WDEL-FM simulcasts the programming of WDEL 1150 AM:

Call sign	Frequency	City of license	Facility ID	ERP W	Height m (ft)	Class	Transmitter coordinates
WDEL-FM	101.7 FM	Canton, New Jersey	51136	3,300	91 m (299 ft)	A	39°25′53.6″N 75°20′12.0″W

== See also ==
- WDEL-FM
