= Edward Tyll =

American comedian and radio personality (born 1956)

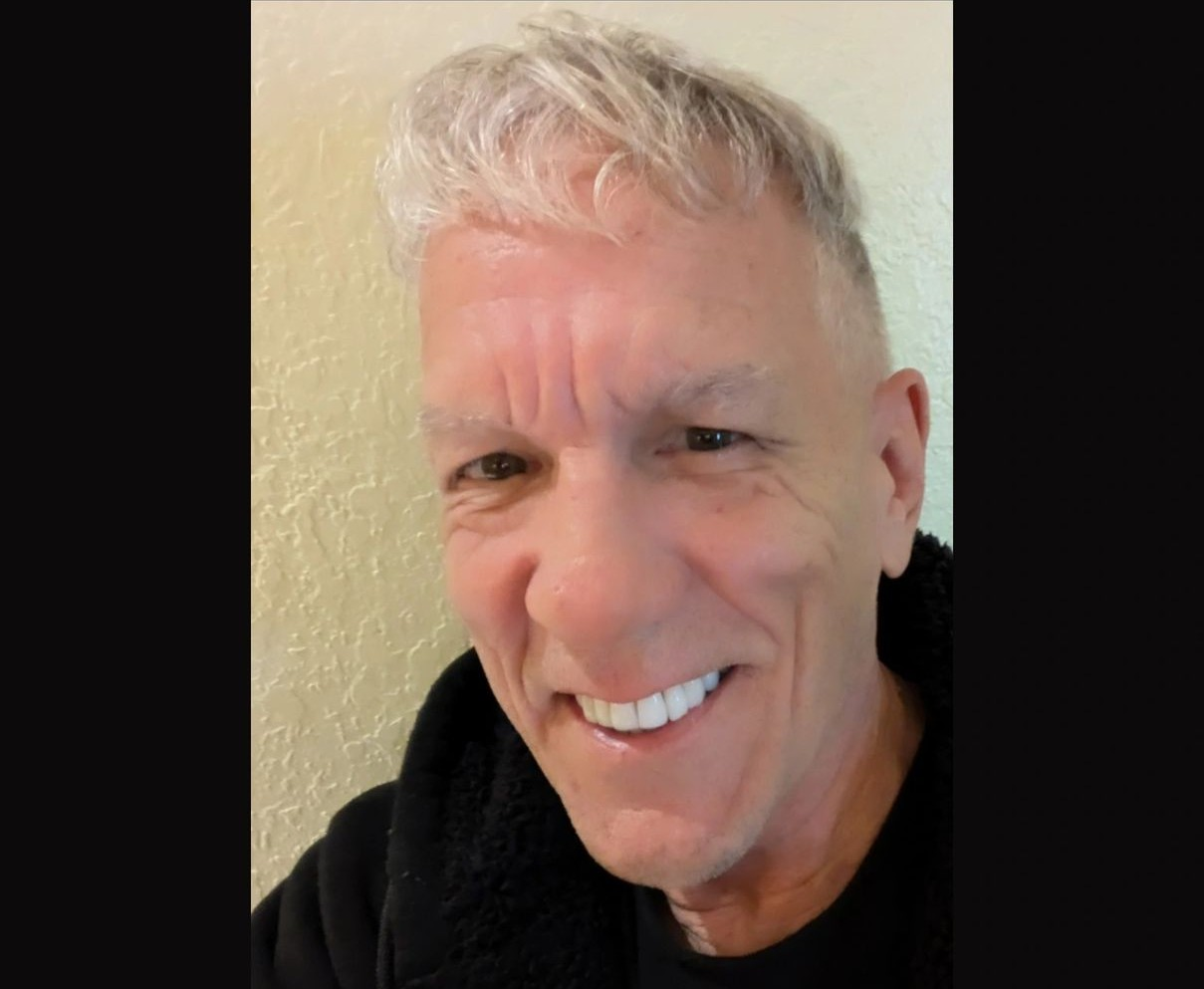
- Edward Tyll 2025
- Born: February 6, 1956 (age 70); The Bronx, New York, USA
- Occupations: Comedian, Radio Personality

Edward Tyll (born February 6, 1956) is an American comedian and radio personality.

Tyll was born in The Bronx, New York USA the only child of Italian-Polish-American parents. He earned a B.S. in Sociology and briefly attended law school before becoming a talk radio host.

He has appeared as a commentator on network TV and hosted a syndicated radio show heard in Los Angeles, Chicago, Philadelphia, Detroit, Atlanta, Long Island, New Orleans, Seattle, Portland and other cities. A political independent, with a libertarian and liberal bent, Tyll gained notoriety when he briefly replaced conservative host Larry Elder on KABC (AM) Los Angeles.

== Radio career ==
=== 1980s ===
In the early 1980s, Tyll hosted a conservative talk radio program on WPBR in Palm Beach, Florida. This weeknight show first brought Tyll to acclaim and national attention when he became involved in the resolution of a February 1984 hostage situation.

On March 2, 1987, Tyll began a short, highly rated run at WGST in Atlanta, Georgia. Tyll drew press attention and controversy when he announced a plan to give away condoms in Woodruff Park during a broadcast. After initial resistance, city officials permitted the giveaway as long as it was part of an educational program on AIDS prevention. His show sparked considerable publicity and controversy leading up to his suspension in July 1987 after insulting John Lewis and Wyche Fowler. After a series of protests and counter-protests, he was reinstated but was ultimately fired by the station in November 1987 after violating FCC regulations by placing a Fulton County assistant district attorney live on the air without her knowledge or consent.

In January 1988, Tyll was hired by WKLS-FM ("96 Rock") in Atlanta. Tyll continued to generate controversy with critics calling his show "tasteless and insulting" leading to station management to promise to "tone down" the show in November 1989.

=== 1990s ===
In January 1990, Tyll began hosting a nighttime talk show on WLUP (1000 AM) in Chicago. He was moved to overnights in May 1991 before being let go in October 1992. The Chicago Sun-Times noted that this was Tyll's eighth radio station in five years.

Tyll spent February 1993 as a fill-in host on WJNO in West Palm Beach, Florida. In March 1993, Tyll moved to Detroit to host an overnight show at the short lived 99-5 WOW-FM. In May 1993, the station flipped to country music and Tyll was let go. In August 1993, Tyll started a weekly show airing Sunday late-night on WYSY (107.9 FM) in west suburban Chicago. He later moved on to work at a radio station in New Orleans.

Tyll was hosting a mid-day call-in talk show at WTKS-FM in Orlando, Florida, when he was hired by KABC in July 1997.

From September 1997 until early February 1998, Tyll hosted a late-afternoon two-hour weekday show on KABC (790 AM) in Los Angeles. Once billed as a conservative talk host, in a February 1998 profile Reason magazine described Tyll as a "journeyman left-liberal host." He had replaced conservative African-American talk host Larry Elder when Elder's show was cut from two to four hours then let go when station management restored Elder's show to its original length.

In April 1998, Tyll began hosting a weeknight talk show from 7 to 10 p.m. on KLSX (97.1 FM) in Los Angeles. Tyll eventually shifted to a 10 p.m. to 1 a.m overnight shift before leaving KLSX on October 22, 1999 to host a syndicated talk show airing middays and originating from the studios of sister station WKRK-FM in Detroit, Michigan where he Hosted a current event call-in show where he played "Devil's Advocate" and started argument's with the caller's. Ed was once again fired.

On June 16, 1999, NBG Radio Network's The Ed Tyll Show began streaming live over the internet via Broadcast.com.

=== 2000s ===
Starting from the station's launch in September 2002, Tyll hosted a mid-day talk show from noon to 3 p.m. on WLIE ("Island Talk 540") on Long Island, New York. In March 2003, Tyll was honored by Talkers magazine on their annual "Heavy Hundred" list of the "most important radio talk show hosts in America." Indeed, Tyll was popular enough to survive an August 2003 cutback in local programming and was one of only two local shows not to be replaced by syndicated programming. His show was moved to afternoon-drive from 3 to 7 p.m. during the shakeup. As of 2007, WLIE is a Spanish language station carrying none of the original "Island Talk 540" programming.

=== 2010s ===
In October 2010, Ed Tyll was once again back in the Orlando radio market on talker WEUS 810 AM (The Big 810 AM). Ed held down the noon - 3pm slot for about 8 months, and then was moved to the 9a-noon slot when the station dropped conservative talk host Laura Ingraham and added Alex Jones to the noon-3p time slot. Ed left the Big 810 AM after 14 months, citing a desire to move his career in another direction.

In January 2018, after airing his talk show on Starcom Radio to rural low-power stations for several years, Tyll moved his show to WXDE where he held down mid-days until again leaving in early 2019. Later that year, he returned to Orlando to host a show at WDYZ (AM).
