= Royal Parker =

American broadcaster

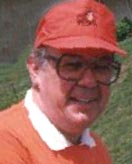
- Royal Parker in the 1980s
- Born: Royal Pollokoff; April 8, 1929; Baltimore, Maryland, U.S.
- Died: January 8, 2016 (aged 86); Pikesville, Maryland, U.S.
- Occupations: Television broadcaster; television host; television producer; radio announcer; radio programmer
- Years active: 1940a–1994
- Spouse: Phyllis
- Children: 3

Royal Pollokoff (April 8, 1929 – January 8, 2016), better known by the stage name Royal Parker, was an American television personality. In a broadcasting career spanning the 1940s–1990s, he appeared in various roles, becoming a staple on television screens in the Baltimore, Maryland, area.

== Early years ==
Born in Baltimore, Maryland, on April 8, 1929, Parker graduated from Baltimore City College in 1946. He began his broadcasting career in the late 1940s on WASA (now WHGM), an AM radio station in Havre de Grace, Maryland, hosting a music program called the Royal Record Review. He moved to television when the medium was in its infancy, joining WAAM-TV (now WJZ-TV) in Baltimore in 1951.

== Television career ==
Parker served in diverse roles during his more than four decade career in television (1951–1994), including newscasts, sports events, children's programs, announcing duties, and commercials. As a television newscaster with WAAM-TV in Baltimore, Parker covered the 1952 elections, when Dwight D. Eisenhower was elected U. S. President and J. Glenn Beall was elected U.S. Senator from Maryland. He created a children's television character, Mister Poplolly, in which he would don an oversized hat and glasses, along with a clown's nose, for a daily show. Later, he portrayed a Popeye-like sailor hosting a daily cartoon show. Parker also did commercials, including The Buddy Deane Show between 1957–1962 (by then, WAAM had been sold to Westinghouse and its call letters changed to WJZ-TV).

In 1962, Parker moved to WBAL-TV, where he hosted such popular televised bowling programs as Pinbusters and Bowling for Dollars in the 1970s. While at WBAL, he played P. W. Doodle, a newsboy character he created based on his own experience selling newspapers in Baltimore as a youth. On November 22, 1963, he was called upon to broadcast the news flash of U.S. President John F. Kennedy's assassination.

Later on his career, Parker broadcast the resignation of Richard Nixon, economic disasters facing the United States, the Iran hostage crisis and the attempted assassination of Ronald Reagan.

Parker remained at WBAL-TV until his retirement in 1994. Reflecting on his varied roles in the early pioneering years of commercial television, Parker recalled in 2008 that when he started at WAAM in 1951, earning $45 per week, "We just figured things out as we went along. In six months, you did everything. I could run a control board, or put on a cooking show".

== Later years and personal life ==
Parker and his wife, Phyllis, had three sons.

After leaving broadcasting, he ran for a seat in the Maryland House of Delegates in 1994, but lost in the primary election. He later took a job as an inspector for the Baltimore City Liquor License Board, retiring from that position in 2006.

In his retirement, Parker remained active in local charitable work, which included frequent benefit appearances for the Mount Washington Pediatric Hospital.

He died of congestive heart failure on January 8, 2016, in Pikesville, Maryland, a Baltimore suburb, at age 86.
