= Radiolicious =

Internet radio service

- Type: Internet radio
- Country: USA
- Owner: MySimBook LLC
- Official website: www.radiolicious.fm

Radiolicious was an internet radio service created by MySimBook, based in Lafayette, Louisiana. Users were able to search and listen to terrestrial radio stations. While listening, users are offered the ability to send in song requests to DJs, enter contests, bookmark favorite stations, post wall comments, share the station with friends, and access social networks such as Facebook.

The service is free to users and is supported by advertisements and barter from participating radio stations.

On October 8, 2008, Radiolicious launched a mobile version of their software available on the Apple iPhone and iPod Touch through the iTunes App Store. In 2009, Citadel Media, formerly ABC Radio Networks, signed a sales and marketing agreement with MySimBook to sell and market Radiolicious to their current affiliates.

As of June, 2012, the Radiolicious app does not function on portable devices, its listing has been removed from Apple's iTunes Store, and the company's web site is no longer available online. Many of the stations that used to use Radiolicious have moved to the TuneIn, iHeartRadio and the lesser known RadioPup apps allowing them to continue to be streamed on portable devices.
