= WNCL =

Radio station in Milford, Delaware

- Milford, Delaware; United States
- Broadcast area: Dover
- Frequency: 930 kHz
- Branding: Cool 102.1 & 930

Programming
- Format: Classic hits
- Affiliations: Westwood One

Ownership
- Owner: Forever Media (sale to Draper Media pending); (FM Radio Licenses, LLC)
- Sister stations: WAFL; WAVD; WCHK-FM; WXDE

History
- First air date: 1953
- Former call signs: WTHD (1968–1980); WAFL (1980–1982); WYUS (1982–2019)
- Call sign meaning: W N CooL (station branding)

Technical information
- Licensing authority: FCC
- Facility ID: 53483
- Class: D
- Power: 500 watts day; 81 watts night
- Transmitter coordinates: 38°55′39″N 75°29′20″W
- Translator: 102.1 W271CX (Milford)

Links
- Public license information: Public file; LMS
- Webcast: Listen live
- Website: www.foreverdelmarva.com/cool1021/

WNCL (930 AM, "Cool 102.1/930") is a commercial radio station licensed to Milford, Delaware, United States. Owned by Forever Media, it broadcasts a classic hits format serving Dover. It is simulcast on FM translator 102.1 W271CX in Milford.

== History ==
Before ESPN, the then-WYUS 930 used to air a Spanish language Contemporary Hit Radio music format called "La Exitosa".

WYUS 930 also broadcasts from a translator located in Milford DE on 102.1 FM with 250 watts.

The station was assigned the WYUS call sign by the Federal Communications Commission on September 2, 1982.

In late-October 2019, the station dropped ESPN Radio, and flipped to classic hits as Cool 102.1/930. The format and branding originated from sister station WNCL, which had begun to transition to the country music format The Chicken. WYUS also adopted the WNCL calls.

== Translators ==
Broadcast translator for WNCL
Call sign	Frequency	City of license	FID	ERP (W)	HAAT	Class	FCC info
W271CX	102.1 FM	Milford, Delaware	151295	250	76 m (249 ft)	D	LMS
