= WKTT (FM) =

- Salisbury, Maryland; United States
- Frequency: 97.5 MHz
- Branding: Live 97.5

Programming
- Format: Mainstream urban
- Affiliations: Premiere Networks

Ownership
- Owner: Rojo Broadcasting, LLC

History
- First air date: September 3, 1969 (as WICO-FM at 94.3)
- Former call signs: WICO-FM (1969–2009)
- Former frequencies: 94.3 MHz (1969–1999)
- Call sign meaning: "Cat Country" (previous format)

Technical information
- Licensing authority: FCC
- Facility ID: 53489
- Class: A
- ERP: 3,700 watts
- HAAT: 100 meters (330 ft)
- Transmitter coordinates: 38°21′37.4″N 75°37′7.2″W

Links
- Public license information: Public file; LMS
- Webcast: Listen live
- Website: live975.com

WKTT (97.5 MHz, "Live 97.5") is an FM radio station licensed to serve Salisbury, Maryland, United States. The station, which began broadcasting in 1969, is owned by Rojo Broadcasting, LLC. WKTT broadcasts a mainstream urban format.

== History ==
WICO-FM signed on September 3, 1969, at 94.3 FM. WICO-FM moved up the dial to 97.5 FM in 1999 which cleared the way for WINX-FM to sign on the air at 94.3 FM in Cambridge, Maryland.

After nearly 40 years of broadcasting as WICO-FM, the station was assigned the WKTT call sign by the Federal Communications Commission on March 30, 2009.

WKTT and sister station WICO (1320 AM) were purchased effective May 12, 2016, from Delmarva Broadcasting Company by Robin Rothschild, at a purchase price of $300,000.

On March 1, 2017, WKTT changed its format from country to urban contemporary, branded as "Live 97.5" after it was sold to Rojo Broadcasting, LLC for $305,000.
