= WXMC =

Radio station in Parsippany-Troy Hills, New Jersey

Simulcast with WBWD, Islip, New York
- Parsippany-Troy Hills, New Jersey; United States
- Broadcast area: Morris and Sussex counties
- Frequency: 1310 kHz
- Branding: Radio Zindagi

Programming
- Languages: English and Hindi
- Format: Indian talk / music

Ownership
- Owner: Cantico Nuevo Ministry, Inc.
- Operator: Sunil Hali

History
- First air date: 1973

Technical information
- Licensing authority: FCC
- Facility ID: 29957
- Class: D
- Power: 1,000 watts (day); 88 watts (night)
- Transmitter coordinates: 40.8642°N 74.3517°W
- Translator: 96.7 W244DU (Parsippany)
- Repeaters: 540 WBWD (Islip); 101.5 WKXW-HD3 (Trenton)

Links
- Public license information: Public file; LMS
- Webcast: Listen live
- Website: radiozindagi.com/newyork/

WXMC (1310 AM "Radio Zindagi") is a radio station licensed to Parsippany-Troy Hills, New Jersey. The station is currently owned by Cantico Nuevo Ministry, Inc. broadcasting an Indian and South Asian radio format.
