= WDEL-FM =

Radio station in Canton, New Jersey

Simulcast of WDEL, Wilmington, Delaware
- Canton, New Jersey; United States
- Broadcast area: Philadelphia metropolitan area
- Frequency: 101.7 MHz
- Branding: WDEL 101.7 FM 1150 AM

Programming
- Format: News/talk
- Network: ABC News Radio
- Affiliations: Philadelphia Eagles Radio Network; Philadelphia Phillies Radio Network; Westwood One; VSiN

Ownership
- Owner: Draper Holdings Business Trust; (WBOC, Inc.)
- Sister stations: WDEL; WSTW; WXCY-FM

History
- First air date: January 15, 1972 (as WNNN)
- Former call signs: WNNN (1972–1997); WJKS (1997–2015)
- Call sign meaning: Delaware (from parent station WDEL)

Technical information
- Licensing authority: FCC
- Facility ID: 51136
- Class: A
- ERP: 3,300 watts
- HAAT: 91 meters (299 ft)
- Transmitter coordinates: 39°25′53.6″N 75°20′12″W

Links
- Public license information: Public file; LMS
- Webcast: Listen live
- Website: www.wdel.com

WDEL-FM (101.7 MHz) is a commercial radio station licensed to Canton, New Jersey, United States. It simulcasts a news/talk format with WDEL (1150 AM) in Wilmington, Delaware. WDEL-AM-FM are owned and operated by Draper Holdings Business Trust with studios and offices on Shipley Road in Wilmington.

The FM transmitter is on Macanippuck Road in Greenwich Township. The signal extends from South Jersey into Northern Delaware, allowing listeners in the Wilmington area to hear WDEL's programming on FM as well as AM.

== History ==
On January 15, 1972, the station signed on as WNNN. It carried a beautiful music format initially, but after a year or two, switched to Christian radio programming, including preaching shows and religious music. By March 1989 the station had adopted the slogan of "Win 101.7".

QC Communications purchased the station on July 1, 1997, for $1.8 million. It put an urban adult contemporary format on the station.

In December 2014, QC Communications announced it would sell WJKS to Delmarva Broadcasting. Delmarva Broadcasting is a subsidiary of Steinman Enterprises, a family-owned newspaper, broadcasting and mining company, based in Lancaster, Pennsylvania. As the license transfer was being completed, Delmarva began a local marketing agreement (LMA) to take over the running of WJKS, effective January 1, 2015.

On April 1, 2015, at 10:02 p.m., Delmarva flipped WJKS to a simulcast of WDEL (1150 AM). A call sign change to WDEL-FM took effect the next day. (In the 1950s and 1960s, the WDEL-FM call letters had been used on WSTW, which is co-owned with WDEL-AM-FM.) The sale to Delmarva Broadcasting was consummated on June 30, 2015, at a price of $3.25 million for WDEL-FM and sister station WFAI.

Forever Media bought Delmarva Broadcasting in early 2019 for $18.5 million.

In June 2025, Forever Media sold six of its stations (including WDEL-FM) to Draper Media for $11 million.

== Programming and sports ==
WDEL-AM-FM feature local talk and information shows on weekdays with nationally syndicated talk programs at night: The Ramsey Show with Dave Ramsey, Rich Valdés America at Night, Red Eye Radio and America in the Morning. On weekends, WDEL-AM-FM have specialty shows devoted to money, sports, real estate, home repair, gardening and travel, including some paid brokered programming. Syndicated shows on weekends includes The Money Pit, Eye on Travel with Peter Greenberg, Jill on Money, The CBS News Weekend Roundup and Motley Fool Money. World and national news is supplied by ABC News Radio.

WDEL-AM-FM carry Philadelphia Phillies baseball and Philadelphia Eagles football. Additionally, WDEL-AM-FM air New Castle County high school football and basketball games. Sports betting shows from VSiN are heard on weekend nights.

== See also ==
- WDEL (AM)
