= Tom Kraeutler =

American radio host (died 2025)

- Born: Thomas A. Kraeutler; 1959 or 1960
- Died: February 2, 2025 (aged 65)
- Education: Trenton State College; University of Copenhagen
- Occupations: Talk radio host Author
- Known for: Home improvement Remodeling

Thomas A. Kraeutler (1959 or 1960 – February 2, 2025) was an American home improvement authority, author and broadcast journalist.

Kraeutler co-hosted (with Leslie Segrete) the nationally syndicated The Money Pit Home Improvement Radio Show broadcast on more than 335 stations every weekend, reaching an audience of more than 3 million listeners. His home improvement tips were also broadcast across 350 radio stations weekdays during morning drive time. Talkers Magazine named Kraeutler one of the “100 Most Important Radio Talk Show Hosts in America.” He also published a weekly home improvement newsletter and podcasts the national radio program. The podcast of the show usually ranked at the top of the home improvement listings on iTunes.

Kraeutler frequently contributed content to sites like Oprah.com, AOL Daily Finance, and DIYLife.com. He has also served as the Home Improvement Editor for AOL, providing the site with a wide variety of multimedia content. His book, My Home, My Money Pit (co-authored with Segrete) was published by the Knack imprint of The Globe Pequot Press in 2008.

Kraeutler appeared frequently on a wide range of network news and daytime television programs. He is often quoted as a home-improvement expert in major publications like the New York Times, USA Today and CNN.

He was a remodeling columnist for House Beautiful, and contributed to or been featured in many national magazines including Smart Money, Reader's Digest and Consumer's Digest.

Kraeutler had more than two decades of experience as a professional home inspector, former building contractor and industrial arts educator. He was appointed by former New Jersey Governor Christine Todd Whitman to the state's first regulatory authority for the licensing of professional home inspectors, which he chaired for several years.

Kraeutler held a BS in Industrial Arts Technology Education from Trenton State College and completed an international studies program in architecture at the University of Copenhagen in Denmark.

Kraeutler died from complications of surgery on February 2, 2025, at the age of 65.

== Bibliography ==
- Tom Kraeutler; Leslie Segrete (2008). My Home, My Money Pit: Your Guide to Every Home Improvement Adventure. Knack. ISBN 978-1-59921-287-6. "Tom Kraeutler."
