= WBWD (AM) =

Radio station in Islip, New York

Simulcast with WXMC, Parsippany, NJ
- Islip, New York; United States
- Broadcast area: Long Island
- Frequency: 540 kHz
- Branding: Radio Zindagi

Programming
- Languages: English and Hindi
- Format: South Asian talk radio and Bollywood music

Ownership
- Owner: Om Sai Broadcasting, LLC

History
- First air date: October 16, 1959
- Former call signs: WBIC (1959–1967); WLIX (1967–1995); WLUX (1995–2002); WLIE (2002–2018)
- Call sign meaning: Bollywood

Technical information
- Licensing authority: FCC
- Facility ID: 37805
- Class: B
- Power: 10,000 watts (day); 220 watts (night)
- Transmitter coordinates: 40°45′6.4″N 73°12′48.4″W
- Repeaters: 1310 WXMC (Parsippany-Troy Hills); 101.5 WKXW-HD3 (Trenton)

Links
- Public license information: Public file; LMS
- Webcast: Listen live
- Website: radiozindagi.com/newyork/

WBWD (540 AM, Radio Zindagi) is a commercial radio station licensed to serve Islip, New York, and covering Long Island. It is owned by Om Sai Broadcasting and airs a South Asian radio format. Programming is in English and Hindi, with Bollywood music and talk radio, simulcast with 1310 WXMC in Parsippany-Troy Hills, New Jersey. WBWD's studios are located in Edison, New Jersey, while its transmitter is in Islip.

== History ==
=== WBIC (1959-1967) ===
The station, originally owned by South Shore Broadcasting, signed on the air on October 16, 1959, as WBIC, with studios on Main Street in Bay Shore. It was a daytimer station, powered at 250 watts.

Since the station occupied a Canadian-Mexican clear-channel frequency, it was required to go off the air at sundown. Bob 'Bobaloo' Lewis, who would later gain fame as one of the "All American" disc jockeys on WABC 770 AM in New York City, was one of the original DJs on WBIC.

=== WLIX (1967–1980s) ===
In June 1967, the station was purchased by Long Island Broadcasting Corporation. It was owned by former Mutual Broadcasting System chairman and political leader Malcolm E. Smith Jr. The call letters were changed to WLIX, effective June 26, 1967. By the early 1970s, it broadcast an automated Beautiful Music format. On Sunday mornings, it had an Italian-American music program hosted by Joe Rotolo.

In the mid-1970s, it changed to brokered Christian talk and teaching programming, still as WLIX. In 1981, this station was featured on the NBC series Real People.

In 1983, authority was granted for nighttime operation at reduced power, using a directional antenna.

=== WLUX (1990s) ===
In the mid-1990s, the call sign switched to WLUX. It began playing an adult standards and soft oldies format. Some programming came from the "Music of Your Life" syndicated service.

The station was co-owned with a weekly Long Island newspaper and it had its studios in the newspaper's printing plant in East Farmingdale.

=== WLIE (2000s) ===
In September 2002, the station changed call letters to WLIE and flipped formats. It became a talk radio station. Most programming was locally produced.

Mornings were hosted by David Weiss, Tracy Burgess, and later with Weiss and Amanda Clarke; and Steve Reggie with Traffic. Ed Tyll hosted middays, and Mike Seigel hosted afternoon drive time with Matt Bartlett on Traffic. Evenings featured a rotating schedule of paid brokered programming. Overnights featured Jim Bohannon from Westwood One. Weekends featured Lynn Samuels. The Program Director of IslandTalk 540 was John McDermott, a long time producer at WOR.

Later the talk format was dropped for a business talk format. The WLIE call letters referred to the Long Island Expressway. Beginning in 2008, the station started airing Spanish language religious shows. It broadcast a variety format, including leased air-time and news/talk programs.

=== WBWD (2018–present) ===
On November 9, 2018, the station's call sign was changed to WBWD. On December 3, 2018, WBWD changed its format to Bollywood music, branded as "Bolly 540 AM". DJs were heard speaking a mix of English and Hindi.

In October 2020, the station was sold to Metro Mex USA LLC, and the station's format was changed to Spanish language Christian radio. The sale was consummated on December 1, 2020, at a price of $700,000.

On December 10, 2020, the station was sold for $1.3 million to Yash Pandya's Om Sai Broadcasting. The station's format reverted to the previous Indian and South Asian format, Radio Zindagi.
