= Leslie Segrete =

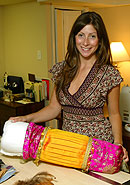
- Born: February 28, 1975 (age 51); Bethpage, New York
- Occupations: Designer, seamstress, carpenter, and television personality

Leslie Segrete (/sɛˈɡrɛti/ seg-RET-ee; born February 28, 1975) is an American designer, seamstress, carpenter, and television personality. She is best known for her work on the TLC show While You Were Out, which concluded a four-year run in 2006. She also appeared as a designer on Trading Spaces and Ugliest House on the Block. She currently co-hosts The Money Pit Home Improvement Radio Show with Tom Kraeutler. In 2014, she joined the television show Hotel Impossible as a designer.

== Biography ==
Segrete was born in Bethpage, New York. She grew up interested in working with her hands, as her father was an architect and her mother a sewer and crafter. She studied set design at Hofstra University and graduated with a degree from the French Culinary Institute.

She began her career as a stagehand and food arranger for Good Morning America and as art designer for the Ricki Lake Show. She was the head set designer for the Oxygen Network when she joined the cast of While You Were Out after hearing from a friend that TLC was looking for a female carpenter to "fill in" on the show.

== Current projects ==
Segrete currently writes monthly columns for two magazines, do! and House Beautiful. She also co-hosts (with Tom Kraeutler) a syndicated call-in radio show on home improvement called The Money Pit Home Improvement Radio Show which, in 2013, was broadcast on 300 stations nationwide. In September 2008, Segrete hosted Going Green Long Island, a PBS special about anti-global warming efforts on her native Long Island, New York, airing on WLIW Channel 21. Most recently, Segrete is co-host of the A&E show $100 Makeover, where she showcases her design expertise.

Segrete joined the cast of the Travel Channel's Hotel Impossible for its fourth season in 2014, serving as one of the program's designers.
