= Joseph Kraeutler =

American businessman (born 1977)

Joseph Kraeutler (born November 21, 1977) is the former head of the Photographs Department at Phillips de Pury & Company. Kraeutler is a graduate of Elmira College.
