= WOCQ (AM) =

Radio station in Salem, New Jersey, serving Wilmington, Delaware

- Salem, New Jersey; United States
- Broadcast area: Wilmington, Delaware
- Frequency: 1510 kHz
- Branding: Máxima 104.1

Programming
- Language: Spanish
- Format: Contemporary hit radio

Ownership
- Owner: Voice Radio Network; (The Voice Radio New Jersey, LLC)

History
- First air date: 1966 (as WJIC)
- Former call signs: WJIC (1966–1997); WNNN (1997–2001); WFAI (2001–2019); WVJJ (2019–2021); WXCY (2021–2023)

Technical information
- Licensing authority: FCC
- Facility ID: 52768
- Class: D
- Power: 2,500 watts day
- Transmitter coordinates: 39°35′0.41″N 75°27′36.71″W
- Translator: 104.1 W281CM (Millville)

Links
- Public license information: Public file; LMS
- Webcast: Listen live
- Website: holamusica.com/station-wocq/

WOCQ (1510 AM) is a commercial radio station licensed to Salem, New Jersey, and serving the southern part of Greater Philadelphia, including Wilmington, Delaware. It broadcasts a Spanish contemporary hit radio format. WOCQ is owned by Voice Radio Network.

The station is heard around the clock on its FM translator in Millville, New Jersey, W281CM, broadcasting at 104.1 FM.

== History ==
The station signed on in 1966 as WJIC ("Jersey Information Center") airing middle of the road (MOR) music and information. From 1981 to the early 1990s, WJIC featured a country music format as "Just Country WJIC", then changed to a talk radio and information format, calling itself "News/Talk 1510".

On October 1, 1997, WJIC, which was co-owned with WNNN (101.7 FM), took over the FM station's religious format as Faith 1510 and adopted the WNNN call sign. On May 3, 2001, the call sign was changed to WFAI. The FM call letters were later switched to WJKS.

In December 2014, QC Communications sold WFAI and WJKS for $3.2 million to Delmarva Broadcasting Company, a subsidiary of Lancaster, Pennsylvania-based Steinman Enterprises. In February 2019, Delmarva Broadcasting Company was acquired by Forever Media. On October 24, 2019, WFAI flipped to urban adult contemporary, branded as Jammin' 96.9, which was simulcast on translator W245CJ. It also changed its call sign to WVJJ. WVJJ was also heard on the HD3 channel of WSTW in Wilmington.

On January 1, 2021, WVJJ changed its format from urban adult contemporary to a simulcast of country-formatted WXCY-FM 103.7 from Havre de Grace, Maryland, under a new WXCY call sign.

Starting October 6, 2023, Forever Media leased WXCY to Voice Radio Network, who began using it to carry the "Máxima 104.1" Spanish CHR programming of its FM translator in Millville, New Jersey, W281CM (104.1); the lease came ahead of a sale of the station to Voice. The "Máxima" programming had previously been originated on the HD2 channel of WJBR-FM, an arrangement that was terminated following that station's acquisition by VCY America. On October 19, 2023, WXCY changed its call sign to WOCQ.

== Translator ==
Call sign	Frequency	City of license	FID	ERP (W)	Class	Transmitter coordinates	FCC info
W281CM	104.1 FM	Millville, New Jersey	138243	250	D	39°41′43.3″N 75°17′53.5″W	LMS
