= WAFL (FM) =

Radio station in Milford, Delaware

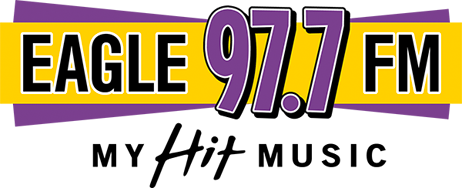
- Milford, Delaware; United States
- Broadcast area: Dover
- Frequency: 97.7 MHz (HD Radio)
- Branding: Eagle 97.7

Programming
- Format: Contemporary hits
- Affiliations: Premiere Networks; Philadelphia Eagles Radio Network

Ownership
- Owner: Forever Media (sale to Draper Media pending); (FM Radio Licenses, LLC)
- Sister stations: WAVD; WCHK-FM; WNCL; WXDE

History
- First air date: May 19, 1973
- Former call signs: WAFL (1973–1981); WAFL-FM (1981–1984)

Technical information
- Licensing authority: FCC
- Facility ID: 53482
- Class: A
- ERP: 3,000 watts
- HAAT: 100 meters (330 ft)
- Transmitter coordinates: 38°55′39.00″N 75°29′20.00″W

Links
- Public license information: Public file; LMS
- Webcast: Listen live
- Website: foreverdelmarva.com/eagle977

WAFL (97.7 FM) is a radio station broadcasting a Top 40 format. Licensed to Milford, Delaware, United States, the station serves the Dover area. The station is currently owned by Forever Media. The station is also broadcast on HD radio.

== History ==
The station first went on the air as WAFL-FM on May 19, 1973, under the ownership of Thomas H. Draper, who would go on to purchase WBOC-TV.

The station originally broadcast a country format with the tagline of "The Country King". After that, the station changed its format to an adult contemporary format and became WAFL - Great Hits.

In September 1994, WAFL shifted to the then-groundbreaking hot adult contemporary format as Eagle 97.7. As of November 2022, Eagle 97.7 has shifted to a Top 40 format, focusing on current and recent hits.
