= WKHZ =

- Easton, Maryland; United States
- Frequency: 1460 kHz
- Branding: 1460 KHZ

Programming
- Format: Oldies

Ownership
- Owner: Christopher Roth and Vincent Klepac; (Emmet Broadcasting LLC)

History
- First air date: 1960
- Former call signs: WEMD (1960–1981); WCEI (1981–2002); WEMD (2002–2010)

Technical information
- Licensing authority: FCC
- Facility ID: 11667
- Class: B
- Power: 1,000 watts day; 500 watts night
- Transmitter coordinates: 38°46′13.42″N 76°4′53.79″W

Links
- Public license information: Public file; LMS
- Webcast: Listen live (via iHeartRadio)

WKHZ (1460 AM) is a radio station licensed to Easton, Maryland, United States. The station is owned by Bill Parris.

In October 2010, the station was transferred from its former owner, First Media Radio, LLC, to Radio Broadcast Communications, Inc. The station's call letters were then changed from WEMD to WKHZ on December 30, 2010.

The station became part of the KHZTV network with stations throughout Maryland including WAMD in Harford County and WYRE in Annapolis. Considered a multimedia platform with an internet TV channel playing videos and the audio on the networked radio stations, personalities such as Tracy Hart work as VJs.

After years of foreign language broadcasting, WKHZ is now owned and operated by Emmet Broadcasting and is programming 50's and 60's oldies music.
