= WSTW =

Rradio station in Wilmington, Delaware

- Wilmington, Delaware; United States
- Broadcast area: Philadelphia metropolitan area
- Frequency: 93.7 MHz (HD Radio)
- Branding: 93.7 WSTW

Programming
- Language: English
- Format: Contemporary hit radio
- Subchannels: HD2: Simulcast of WDEL-AM -FM (news/talk); HD3: Simulcast of WXCY-FM (country music)

Ownership
- Owner: Draper Holdings Business Trust; (WBOC, Inc.)
- Sister stations: WDEL; WDEL-FM; WXCY-FM

History
- First air date: 1950 (as WDEL-FM)
- Former call signs: WDEL-FM (1950–1969)
- Call sign meaning: "We're Stereo to Wilmington"

Technical information
- Licensing authority: FCC
- Facility ID: 16459
- Class: B
- ERP: 47,100 watts (analog); 1,290 watts (digital)
- HAAT: 153 meters (502 ft)
- Transmitter coordinates: 39°48′57.4″N 75°31′45.7″W
- Translator: See § Translators

Links
- Public license information: Public file; LMS
- Webcast: Listen live
- Website: www.wstw.com

WSTW (93.7 FM, "93.7 WSTW") is a commercial radio station licensed to serve Wilmington, Delaware and serving the Delaware Valley. The station is owned by Draper Holdings Business Trust and broadcasts a Contemporary hit radio format.

WSTW's studios and offices are on Shipley Road in Wilmington. Its broadcast tower is also located there, north of Downtown Wilmington at (39°48′57.3″N 75°31′45.2″W). In addition to Wilmington and Northern Delaware, the station's 47,100 watt signal covers Philadelphia and other parts of Pennsylvania as well as sections of New Jersey and Maryland.

== History ==
In 1950, the station signed on as WDEL-FM. At first it simulcast the programming of sister station WDEL (1150 AM), airing middle of the road music, talk, news and sports. But by the late 1960s, it was separately programmed, switching the call sign to WSTW. The call sign stood for "We're Stereo to Wilmington", as the first stereo FM in Wilmington, Delaware - its city of license. It was owned by Steinman Enterprises, a family-owned broadcasting, newspaper and mining company based in Lancaster, Pennsylvania. For more than a decade, WSTW carried an easy listening and middle of the road music format that was largely automated.

In 1980, WSTW switched to an automated Top 40 format, using the TM "Stereo Rock" service. By the mid-1980s, station management added disc jockeys and ended the automation. Over the years, the station has made slight changes in programming, switching from Top 40 to hot adult contemporary and back again. In the mid-1990s, the station made the move to Hot AC. Around 2000, it moved back to Top 40.

In May 2005, WSTW created the "Rewards" program for winning and obtaining prizes. The "Choice Rewards" system allows listeners of the station to bid on auctions for WSTW concerts, merchandise, etc., based on how many points the user has. Users obtain these points by typing in "Choice Words", which they hear on WSTW itself, on the "Rewards" website. The "Rewards" program was changed later, with "Choice Words" being solely found on the WSTW webpage, at station appearances, and via online surveys.

In 2006, WSTW was chosen as CHR Station of the Year of the Marconi Award by the National Association of Broadcasters.

WSTW HD2 is a simulcast of news/talk sister station WDEL and WDEL-FM. WSTW HD3 is a simulcast of country sister station WXCY-FM and may be heard in analog at 96.9 MHz.

On February 5, 2019, Forever Media, LLC bought out Delmarva Broadcasting Company for $18.5 million, adding 10 more stations to Forever Media, LLC's group of stations in Pennsylvania and Maryland.

In June 2025, Forever Media sold six of its stations (including WSTW) to Draper Media for $11 million.

=== Former air staff ===
Some notable former air staff members include Alan Price (former morning show personality); Ellis B. "Bruce Ellis" Feaster, now at WPOZ in Orlando, Florida; Dave Fleetwood, recently at WGBG-FM in Seaford, Delaware; and Dave Walls, now an anchor/reporter for WSET-TV in Lynchburg, Virginia.

== Translators ==
Broadcast translator for WSTW-HD3
Call sign	Frequency	City of license	FID	ERP (W)	HAAT	Class	Transmitter coordinates	FCC info	Notes
W245CJ	96.9 FM	Wilmington, Delaware	139424	250 (Horizontal)	170 m (558 ft)	D	39°48′56.2″N 75°31′48″W	LMS	Simulcast with 103.7 WXCY-FM
