= WAMD (AM) =

Radio station in Aberdeen, Maryland

Coordinates: 39°30′35″N 76°11′38″W

- Aberdeen, Maryland; United States
- Broadcast area: Central Maryland
- Frequency: 970 kHz
- Branding: 970 & 1330 WAMD

Programming
- Language: English
- Format: Adult hits

Ownership
- Owner: Andrulonis Media; (Sweet Tea Radio, LLC)
- Sister stations: WHGM

History
- First air date: 1957
- Call sign meaning: Aberdeen, Maryland

Technical information
- Licensing authority: FCC
- Facility ID: 39550
- Class: B
- Power: 300 watts (day); 500 watts (night)
- Translator: 104.7 W284BE (Havre de Grace)
- Repeater: 1330 WHGM (Havre de Grace)

Links
- Public license information: Public file; LMS

WAMD (970 kHz) is a commercial AM radio station based in Aberdeen, Maryland. The station is owned by Andrulonis Media. Reception for WAMD is northern Harford County. The station airs an adult hits format.

Sale of the station from Salem Broadcasting to Parris was announced on December 15, 2010. During its ownership of the station, Salem Broadcasting reduced WAMD's daytime power from 500 watts to 300 watts and reduced its broadcast coverage to enable then-co-owned WNYM in the New York City area to increase its daytime power from 5 kW to 50 kW. WNYM also broadcasts on 970 AM. WAMD's nighttime power remains at 500 watts.

WAMD returned to the airways on April 23, 2011, under the management of Bill Parris. WAMD is broadcasting the KHZ network in simulcast with WYRE and WKHZ. Considered a multimedia platform with an internet TV channel playing videos and the audio on the networked radio stations, personalities such as Tracy Hart work as VJs.
