= WAVD =

Radio station in Ocean Pines, Maryland

- Ocean Pines, Maryland; United States
- Broadcast area: Ocean City
- Frequency: 97.1 MHz (HD Radio)
- Branding: 97.1 The Wave

Programming
- Format: Classic hits
- Affiliations: Broadcast Architecture

Ownership
- Owner: Forever Media (sale to Draper Media pending); (FM Radio Licenses, LLC)
- Sister stations: WAFL; WCHK-FM; WNCL; WXDE

History
- First air date: 1991
- Former call signs: WZJO (1991–1994); WLFX (1994–1998); WQJZ (1998–2011)
- Call sign meaning: WAVe Delmarva

Technical information
- Licensing authority: FCC
- Facility ID: 53490
- Class: A
- ERP: 4,600 watts
- HAAT: 114 meters (374 ft)
- Transmitter coordinates: 38°22′52.00″N 75°10′32.00″W

Links
- Public license information: Public file; LMS
- Webcast: Listen live
- Website: www.foreverdelmarva.com/971thewave/

WAVD (97.1 FM) is a radio station broadcasting a classic hits format. Licensed to Ocean Pines, Maryland, United States, the station serves Ocean City. The station is currently owned by Forever Media.

WQJZ featured Jones Radio Networks' Smooth Jazz programming until that feed was discontinued on September 30, 2008, as a consequence of Jones having been purchased by Triton Media Group, which also operates the Dial Global stable of 24-hour music formats. Like other former Jones affiliates, WQJZ aired programming from the Broadcast Architecture Network's smooth/urban AC format.

On April 8, 2011, WQJZ changed their format to classic hits, branded as "97.1 The Wave". On April 19, 2011, WQJZ changed their call letters to WAVD to go with "The Wave" branding.
