= The Money Pit Home Improvement Radio Show =

The Money Pit®
- Genre: Home improvement Radio Show
- Running time: 2 hours
- Country of origin: United States
- Language: English
- Syndicates: Radio America
- Hosted by: Tom Kraeutler and Leslie Segrete
- Executive producer: Tom Kraeutler
- Website: The Money Pit Home Improvement Radio Show

The Money Pit is the largest American syndicated radio show offering home improvement advice. It is hosted by Tom Kraeutler and Leslie Segrete and has a call-in format. As of February 2018, The Money Pit airs on over 350 radio stations in the US, as well as in Canada and the Caribbean, as well as by podcast.

The term “money pit” is a pop-culture reference used to describe any activity which consumes unlimited amounts of money, for example homes which need regular repair, maintenance and improvement. On September 20, 2011, The Money Pit was cited during a broadcast of the American television show Jeopardy! as a phrase for a home that keeps needing costly repair and also the name of a home improvement radio show."

== Hosts ==
Tom Kraeutler was a professional home inspector for more than 20 years, and used this experience to build a career as a home improvement expert and journalist. He was the on-air home editor for the Home Page television show (MSNBC), where he focused on such topics as consumer protection, auto safety, crime prevention, and energy efficiency. Kraeutler also served as a home improvement expert on the prime-time personal finance show Take It Personally (CNN), and frequently appears as a guest expert on local, regional and national television and radio programs.

Leslie Segrete has a diverse background including interior design, carpentry, sewing and cooking. In 2017, she was received an Emmy nomination for her work as the Art Director for The Harry Show. She was a member of the design team on the television series While You Were Out (TLC), in which houses were upgraded. Segrete holds a degree from the French Culinary Institute, served as art director for The Ricki Lake Show and the Oxygen Network, and served as a regular guest expert on Good Morning America.

Kraeutler and Segrete also speak on topics of sustainable building and remodeling, energy efficiency and green living. Recently, Kraeutler served as a host for ENERGY STAR's video podcast series, and Segrete hosted the Going Green Long Island series on WLIW21 Public Television in New York.

== Format ==
The Money Pit has a how-to format, in which co-hosts Kraeutler and Segrete give listeners advice on home improvement projects, guidance on choosing the best products and equipment, tips on consumer protection and home safety, and suggestions for saving time and money.

Some notable guests who have appeared on the program include Dirty Jobs host Mike Rowe, home renovation and repair expert Bob Vila, environmentalist Ed Begley, Jr., and former Deputy Secretary of Housing and Urban Development Ron Sims. Interview segments with the cast of the PBS series This Old House are regularly featured on the program.

Each two-hour episode of The Money Pit is available as a weekly iTunes podcast In 2016, it was ranked among the top 100 podcasts in the nation by iTunes, with more than 250,000 monthly downloads.

== Honors ==
The Money Pit has consistently been listed in Talkers Magazine’s “100 Most Important Talk Show Hosts in America.”

== Website ==
The show's website serves as an extension of the two-hour Money Pit home improvement radio show, with home improvement articles and advice, blogs by the hosts, an audio archive of past episodes, and a community forum.

== Book ==
Kraeutler and Segrete co-wrote the book My Home, My Money Pit: Your Guide to Every Home Improvement Adventure, published in 2008.
