= WXCY-FM =

Radio station in Havre de Grace, Maryland

Coordinates: 39.565°N 76.102°W

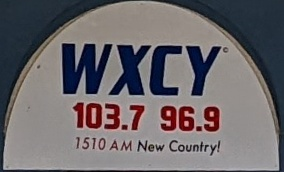
- Havre de Grace, Maryland; United States
- Broadcast area: Baltimore–Wilmington
- Frequency: 103.7 MHz
- Branding: 103.7 WXCY

Programming
- Format: Country

Ownership
- Owner: Draper Holdings Business Trust; (Draper Media, Inc.)
- Sister stations: WDEL; WDEL-FM; WSTW

History
- First air date: October 1960
- Former call signs: WASA-FM (1960–1973); WHDG (1973–1989); WXCY (1989–2021)

Technical information
- Licensing authority: FCC
- Facility ID: 53488
- Class: B
- ERP: 37,000 watts
- HAAT: 168 meters (551 ft)
- Translator: 96.9 W245CJ (Wilmington)
- Repeater: 93.7 WSTW-HD3 (Wilmington)

Links
- Public license information: Public file; LMS
- Webcast: Listen live
- Website: www.wxcyfm.com

WXCY-FM (103.7 FM) is a radio station in Havre de Grace, Maryland. Owned by Draper Holdings Business Trust, it broadcasts a country music format serving the I-95 corridor from Wilmington, Delaware, to Baltimore, Maryland.

== History ==
In 2019, Delmarva Broadcasting Company was acquired by Forever Media.

On January 1, 2021, WXCY began simulcasting on sister station WSTW-HD3 93.7 MHz in Wilmington and its translator W245CJ.

In June 2025, Forever Media sold six of its stations (including WXCY-FM) to Draper Media for $11 million.

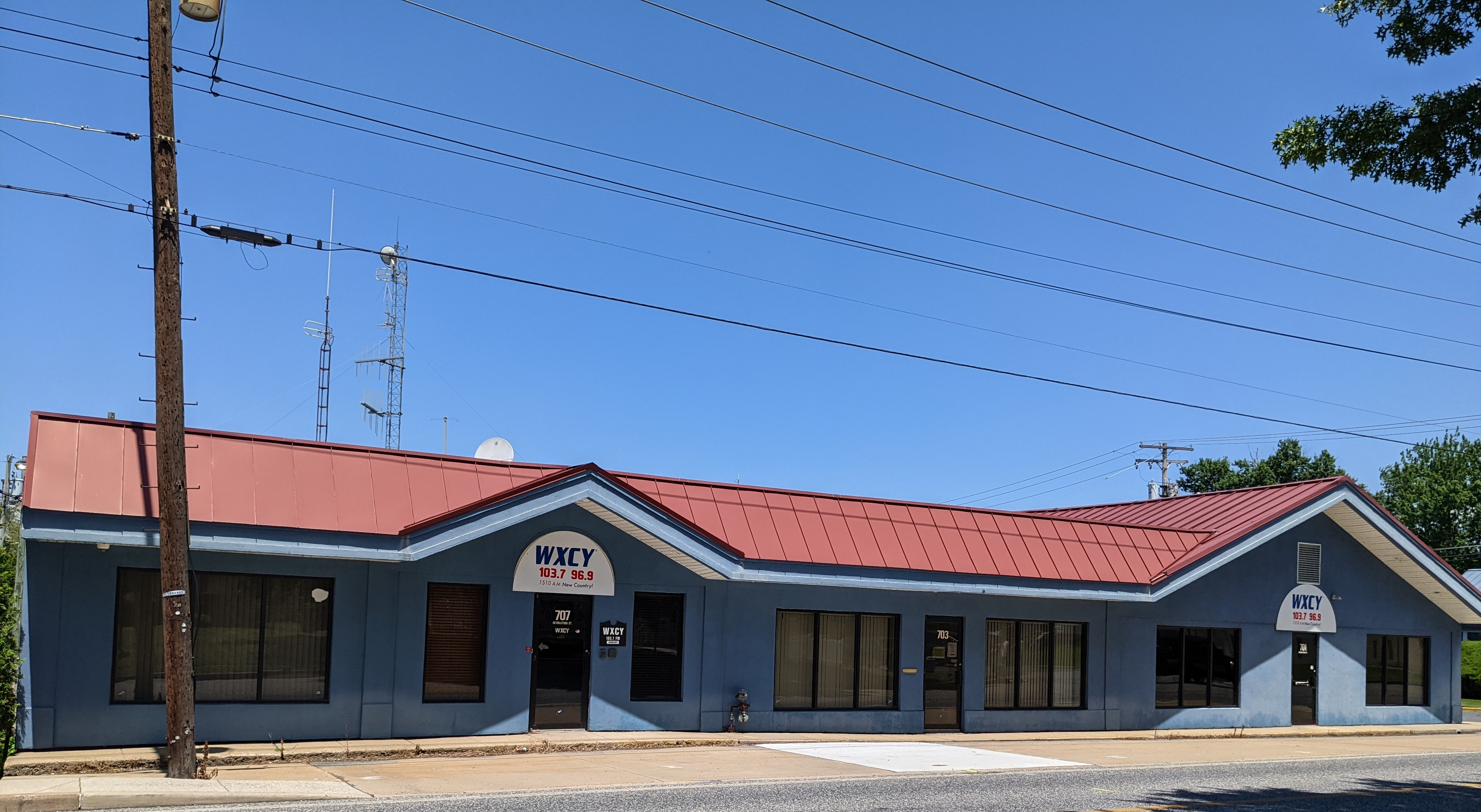
WXCY-FM station in Havre de Grace in July 2022
