= WRNR =

WRNR may refer to:

- WRNR (AM), a radio station (740 AM) licensed to serve Martinsburg, West Virginia, United States
- WRHS (FM), a radio station (103.1 FM) licensed to serve Grasonville, Maryland, United States, which held the call sign WRNR-FM from 1994 to 2023.
- WYRE (AM), a radio station (810 AM) licensed to serve Annapolis, Maryland, United States, which is branded "93.5 WRNR" in homage to the previous station
