= WYRE (AM) =

- Annapolis, Maryland; United States
- Broadcast area: Anne Arundel County; Prince George's County; Montgomery County; Washington, D.C.
- Frequency: 810 kHz
- Branding: WRNR 93.5 FM

Programming
- Format: Adult album alternative

Ownership
- Owner: Cortona Media

History
- First air date: 1947; 79 years ago
- Former call signs: WASL (1947–1957); WIPA (1957–1958); WABW (1958–1963)

Technical information
- Licensing authority: FCC
- Facility ID: 70352
- Class: D
- Power: 250 watts days only
- Transmitter coordinates: 38°58′13.00″N 76°30′28.00″W
- Translators: 93.5 W228DI (Silver Spring); 93.5 W228ER (Annapolis)
- Repeater: (103.5-HD4) WTOP-FM-HD4 (Washington, D.C.)

Links
- Public license information: Public file; LMS
- Website: wrnr.com

WYRE (810 AM) is a commercial radio station broadcasting an adult album alternative (AAA) format. Licensed to Annapolis, Maryland, it serves Anne Arundel County, Prince George's County, Montgomery County, and Washington, D.C. It is owned by Cortona Media with studios on Silopanna Road in Annapolis. WYRE is a relaunch of long-time Annapolis AAA station WRNR-FM (now WRHS), calling itself "WRNR 93.5 FM."

WYRE is a daytimer station, powered at 250 watts and required to go off the air at night to avoid interfering with Class A station WGY Schenectady. Programming is heard around the clock on two FM translators at 93.5 MHz: W228ER, licensed to Annapolis, and W228DI, licensed to Silver Spring, Maryland.

== History ==
=== Early years ===
WYRE has always been a daytimer, required to sign off at sunset. It broadcasts with 250 watts on a tower near Spa Creek in downtown Annapolis. The location next to the Chesapeake Bay affords it a far larger coverage area than a typical 250-watt station, as AM broadcasts travel farther over water. However, WGY in Schenectady is the clear-channel station on 810 AM and is located too close to allow WYRE any nighttime operation.

The station signed on in 1947 as WASL. In 1957, it switched its call sign to WIPA. It exchanged morning and afternoon programs with WIP in Philadelphia during this time, though the stations were not co-owned and it is unknown if the call sign resemblance was intentional. Under Jacob Einstein's management, the station switched its call letters to WABW in 1958, signifying its coverage of three cities, Annapolis, Baltimore and Washington.

The station was sold several times during this period. It was sold again in early 1963, prompting complaints to the Federal Communications Commission (FCC) from Annapolis Broadcasting Corp., owner of WANN (1190 AM) and WXTC (107.9 FM). They claimed the six sales in just over six years constituted "trafficking in licenses" and was essentially a loophole that prevented a proper license renewal hearing from taking place. The commission granted the sale, and on September 8 the station assumed its present call sign and flipped to top-40.

=== Jazz and R&B ===
In 1993, WYRE was purchased by Sequel Broadcasting, owner of full service WNAV (1430 AM) and active rock WXZL (103.1 FM). By then, its music format had aged with its audience to adult contemporary; in September 1994, it flipped to jazz and rhythm and blues music with news and sports coverage.

Jacob Einstein became famous in Washington-area radio as the longtime general manager and later owner of WHFS (both on 102.3 FM and 99.1 FM). He would later briefly own WYRE, WNAV, and WXZL beginning in 1995. Einstein retired in 1997; WYRE was planned to be sold to News Communications of Michigan, who was to flip it to talk radio. This sale fell through, and Einstein retained WYRE and WNAV. In 1999, WYRE was sold to Bay Broadcasting Corporation and flipped to classic country.

=== Spanish Pop and Top 40 ===
By 2003, WYRE was recorded as playing "eclectic music"; that March, it was sold again and began playing Spanish-language pop as "Latino 810". In March 2004, WYRE applied to move to a tower shared with WBMD and WFSI in Essex, an inner suburb of Baltimore. This never occurred, and the construction permit was cancelled in 2006.

In 2007, WYRE flipped to Top 40 hits as part of the "KHZTV Network" originating at WKHZ in Ocean City. This was dropped in June 2009 with a return to Spanish brokered programming. On March 15, 2010, the station rejoined KHZTV, now originating from a new WKHZ in Easton.

=== Landlord dispute ===
On September 20, 2017, WYRE left the air due to a dispute with its landlord. The station filed for remain silent authority on January 11, 2018, which allows for up to six additional months of silence at the FCC's discretion. Pursuant to the Telecommunications Act of 1996, WYRE's license was subject to being deleted if it did not broadcast again by September 19, 2018.

WYRE resumed broadcasting September 19, 2018, relaying 103.1 FM, which by now was local adult album alternative station WRNR-FM. In November 2020 the station flipped to oldies as "810 The Wire". On February 11, 2023, the day 103.1 FM was flipped to a relay of WRBS-FM, WYRE began broadcasting the adult album alternative music, which continued as an online stream. The broadcast played a top of the hour legal ID that says, "The Voice of the Bay, WYRE, Annapolis and WRNR Online" with occasional "103.1 RNR" spot announcements in between songs.

=== Cortona Media ===
In late 2023 and early 2024, Cortona Media, a group including former WRNR-FM owner Steve Kingston as a minority partner, bought WYRE from Bay Broadcasting Corporation. In a separate transaction, it bought Annapolis-licensed FM translator W260BM from Hope Christian Church of Marlton, which had an agreement to rebroadcast WNAV. This led to speculation that the former WRNR-FM's programming would return to FM radio. However, the translator continued rebroadcasting WNAV.

After the sales closed in April 2024, Cortona petitioned the FCC to allow the translator to go silent for a maximum of 180 days "in order to make technical preparations that are necessary to change the primary station" (i.e., begin rebroadcasting WYRE). Cortona also applied to move it to WYRE's tower, change frequencies to 93.5 FM, and increase power. Instead, the translator returned to the air under its previous technical parameters in September, continuing to rebroadcast WNAV. Concurrently with this, WYRE began broadcasting an automated feed of classic rock along with overflow sports programming from WNAV. The former WRNR-FM programming continued as an online stream.

In January 2025, Annapolis City Council approved a lease allowing Cortona to construct the translator at 93.5 FM on WYRE's city-owned tower. WYRE flipped back to the WRNR-FM online stream, and Cortona stated to the Baltimore Sun that it was possible the adult album alternative music would return to FM. The translator was taken silent on March 25 to begin constructions. On May 9, Cortona confirmed to local media website DCRTV that WRNR-FM programming was going to be heard on the translator, with a planned launch over Memorial Day weekend. However, rainy weather delayed construction by a week and the translator filed for its license on June 9. After several weeks of testing, the station relaunched under the branding "WRNR 93.5 FM" with a redesigned website on July 4. Despite the branding, the station is unable to reclaim the WRNR callsign as it is in use on an AM station in Martinsburg, West Virginia.

On February 24, 2026, Cortona and Hubbard Broadcasting announced a deal to simulcast WYRE on the HD4 subchannel of WTOP-FM (103.5 FM) beginning March 1, enabling it to reach the entire Washington, D.C. market. Cortona also leases Hubbard's translator W228DI, licensed to Silver Spring and also on 93.5 FM, to cover Washington proper and its Maryland suburbs in analog.

== Programming ==
WYRE began adding local airstaff, largely made up of former WRNR-FM DJs, in November 2025. Weekdays see Dave Zierner in mornings, Mike Ondayko in middays, and former WHFS DJ Neci Williams in afternoons. In Saturday middays, Bob Waugh hosts the eclectic "Off The Record". Rich Fisher hosts Saturday afternoons, followed by a freeform hour hosted by Jimi Haha and a classic alternative rock hour hosted by Mark Bryan. Carrie Evans hosts Sunday afternoons after briefly hosting middays.

WYRE picked up coverage of Baltimore Ravens games upon its relaunch, replacing WNAV.

== Translator ==
Call sign	Frequency	City of license	FID	ERP (W)	HAAT	Class	Transmitter coordinates	FCC info	Notes
W228DI	93.5 FM	Silver Spring, Maryland	138906	130	88 m (289 ft)	D	39°2′32″N 77°2′49″W	LMS	Owned by Hubbard Broadcasting
W228ER	93.5 FM	Annapolis, Maryland	154359	240	79 m (259 ft)	D	38°58′13.3″N 76°30′26″W	LMS	
