= WRBS =

WRBS may refer to:

- WRBS-FM, a radio station (95.1 FM) licensed to Baltimore, Maryland, United States
- WFOA, a radio station (1230 AM) licensed to Baltimore, Maryland, which held the call sign WRBS from 2006 to 2025
