= WRYS =

Christian adult contemporary radio station in Hagerstown, Maryland

Simulcast with WRBS-FM, Baltimore
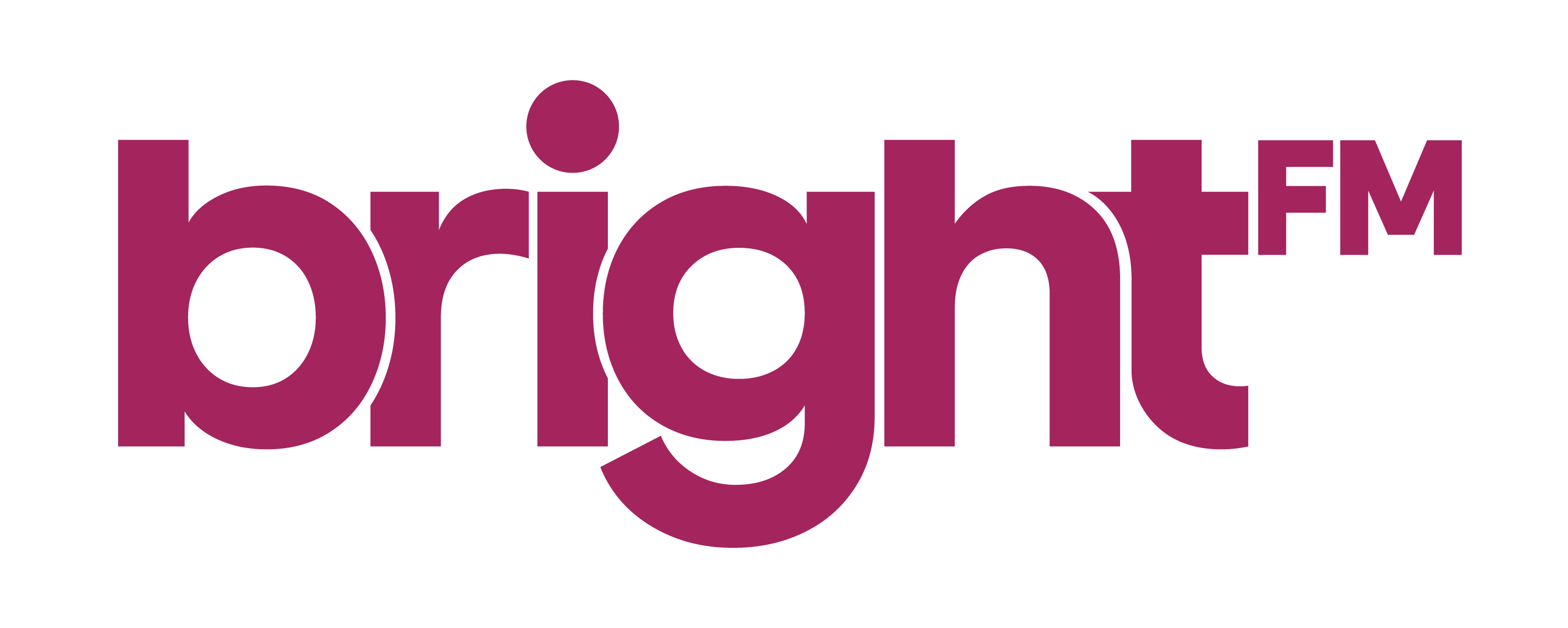
- Hagerstown, Maryland; United States
- Broadcast area: Hagerstown metropolitan area
- Frequency: 104.7 MHz
- RDS: PI: 840e; PS: Title-Artist; RT: Title-Artist
- Branding: Bright-FM

Programming
- Language: English
- Format: Christian adult contemporary

Ownership
- Owner: Peter & John Radio Fellowship, Inc.
- Sister stations: WRBS-FM; WRHS

History
- First air date: January 1947
- Former call signs: WJEJ-FM (1947–1977); WWMD (1977–2000); WAYZ-FM (2000–2005); WAYZ (2005–2025)
- Former frequencies: 95.7 MHz (1947)

Technical information
- Licensing authority: FCC
- Facility ID: 25827
- Class: B
- ERP: 8,300 watts
- HAAT: 420 meters (1,380 ft)
- Transmitter coordinates: 39°41′47.3″N 77°30′45.9″W

Links
- Public license information: Public file; LMS
- Webcast: Listen live
- Website: www.brightfm.com

WRYS (104.7 FM) is a non-commercial, listener-supported radio station licensed to Hagerstown, Maryland. It simulcasts a Christian adult contemporary radio format with WRBS-FM 95.1 in Baltimore and WRHS (103.1 FM) in Grasonville. They are known as "Bright FM" and are owned and operated by Peter & John Radio Fellowship, Inc. The studios and offices are off Commerce Drive near Interstate 95 in Halethorpe, Maryland, using a Baltimore address.

WRYS has an effective radiated power (ERP) of 8,300 watts. The transmitter is near High Rock in Fort Ritchie.

== History ==
FM 104.7 signed on the air in January 1947. The original call sign was WJEJ-FM, the sister station to WJEJ (1240 AM). The stations were owned by the Hagerstown Broadcasting Company and were network affiliates of the Mutual Broadcasting System. At first, the two stations simulcast their programming.

In the late 1970s, the FM station began airing its own beautiful music programming as WWMD. The station was mostly automated and played quarter-hour sweeps of instrumental music, with some Broadway and Hollywood show tunes and a few soft vocals each hour. Over time, the number of vocals increased.

On August 28, 2000, WWMD was traded to Verstandig for WAYZ-FM 101.5 for $2.5 million. For most of the 2000s, the station was WAYZ, airing a country music format.

In July 2025, the 104.7 FM facility was sold to Peter and John Radio Fellowship for $3.1 million. The buyer is a non-profit organization that also owns WRBS-FM 95.1 in Baltimore. WAYZ changed its call sign to WRYS upon the sale's closure, while Verstanding retained the WAYZ branding and call sign for use on another of its stations; the call sign and country format would return to 101.5. Once the sale was completed, WRYS began simulcasting the Christian AC format of WRBS-FM, known as "Bright FM".
