= WNAV =

Coordinates: 38°59′00″N 76°31′21″W

- Annapolis, Maryland; United States
- Broadcast area: Central Maryland
- Frequency: 1430 kHz
- Branding: WNAV

Programming
- Language: English
- Format: Oldies
- Affiliations: Baltimore Orioles Radio Network; Fox News Radio; Navy Midshipmen

Ownership
- Owner: Todd Bartley; (Victory Media of Maryland, LLC)

History
- First air date: April 22, 1949
- Call sign meaning: U.S. Naval Academy

Technical information
- Licensing authority: FCC
- Facility ID: 19554
- Class: B
- Power: 200 watts (STA)
- Translator: 92.7 W224EM (Annapolis)

Links
- Public license information: Public file; LMS
- Webcast: Listen live
- Website: wnav.com

WNAV (1430 AM) is an oldies-formatted radio station located in Annapolis, Maryland. The station is owned by Todd Bartley's Victory Media of Maryland, LLC. Programming is also heard on FM translator W224EM (92.7 FM), also licensed to Annapolis.

== History ==
WNAV signed on along with WNAV-FM 99.1 on April 22, 1949, with studios located at 89 West Street in Annapolis. The original owners were the Capital Broadcasting Company, and the first president and general manager was Albert H. MacCarthy. From the beginning, its programming has been adult-focused music (initially middle of the road) with coverage of local news and the Navy Midshipmen and other local sports. Beginning in 1953, the stations were co-managed with WITH (1230 AM) in Baltimore.

In 1956, WITH and WNAV received attention for organizing a marathon, run from the Maryland State House to Baltimore, in order to raise money and develop athletes for the 1956 Summer Olympics later that year in Melbourne.

In 1959, WNAV received approval to increase power from 1 kW to 5 kW during the day. In 1963, Capital Broadcasting sold WNAV and WNAV-FM to Henry Rau, the owner of WDOV in Dover, Delaware.

In 1970, WNAV and WDOV were two of six Mutual affiliates that filed a lawsuit claiming the Public Health Cigarette Smoking Act, which banned the advertising of cigarettes on radio and television, was a violation of the broadcasters' free speech rights. Lower-court rulings upholding the law were appealed all the way to the United States Supreme Court, which declined to intervene in April 1972.

Rau died in 1981, and his estate decided to sell all of his broadcast interests. WNAV and the recently renamed WLOM were sold in 1983 to ABW Broadcasting for $2.8 million; ABW had previously sold the original WHFS (102.3 FM) to Outlet Broadcasting. The stations made headlines in 1984 and 1985 when they briefly gave a daily call-in show to former Governor of Maryland Marvin Mandel, who had been convicted of fraud and racketeering and imprisoned while in office in 1977.

In 1987, the two stations were sold to Chicago-based Duchossois Communications for $8.2 million. The combination was subsequently broken up as WNAV was re-sold to former WHFS manager (and ABW Broadcasting partner) Jake Einstein two years later for $1.63 million.

In 1997, Einstein, who by then owned all three Annapolis-based radio stations (WNAV, WYRE and WXZL) decided to retire. He sold off the other two stations but kept WNAV. In 1999, Einstein sold WNAV to Wheel of Fortune host and Anne Arundel County resident Pat Sajak for $2.2 million.

Sajak put the station up for sale in 2013, though there were no offers. In 2021, Chris Roth and Frank Brady's BMSC Media purchased the station for $1,000. The deal was contingent on Sajak contributing $100,000 to relocate the station, as he was in the process of selling the land housing the transmitter and studios, valued at $2.6 million, to developers. Ultimately, WNAV continued operating from the existing site under lease.

In December 2021, shortly before the sale closed, the station's entire airstaff of 25 were laid off in an attempt to have it break even for the first time in its history. In 2022, BMSC completed an overhaul of WNAV's staff, music, and branding, with Roth taking over as morning host, John Tesh in middays, and Neal Ellis in afternoon. It also added translator W260BM (99.9 MHz) to provide FM coverage in Annapolis proper.

By 2023, the station was running automated music from The True Oldies Channel in addition to sports programming. BMSC reached a deal that December to sell to Todd Bartley's Victory Media, owner of WINC and WINC-FM in Winchester, Virginia, for $78,000. The sale was approved on May 22, 2024, and closed on March 27, 2025.

After translator W260BM was sold to the ownership of WYRE, new translator W224EM (92.7 FM) was signed-on in April 2026.

In July 2026, Victory Media informed the Federal Communications Commission that the land housing its studios and transmitter had been sold again and the new owner declined to renew its lease. As it had already filed to move W224EM to WMPT's transmitter site in Crownsville, it additionally filed to move WNAV to temporary facilities at that location, operating with 200 watts around the clock.

== Programming ==
Daily programming is music from The True Oldies Channel with Fox News Radio on the hour and local news on the half-hour. Local programming includes The Time Machine, airing Saturday afternoons and specializing in doo-wop and pop music from the 1950s and 60s. The Yacht Club, airing Sunday mornings and specializing in yacht rock from the 1970s through 1990s, moved to WNAV from WTMD (89.7 FM) in 2022 and has since entered syndication.

WNAV is the flagship station of the Navy Midshipmen baseball, men's and women's basketball teams, and men's and women's lacrosse teams. The station has broadcast Navy sports for its entire existence, and its current contract with the college runs through 2027. Additional sports programming consists of Navy football (flagshipped instead at WBAL), the Washington Commanders, the Chesapeake Baysox, the Baltimore Orioles when they do not conflict with the Baysox, and Notre Dame Fighting Irish football on Saturdays where neither Navy nor the Baysox are playing.

== Translator ==
In addition to the main station, WNAV is relayed by one FM translator to alleviate difficulty with AM reception in cities.

Call sign	Frequency	City of license	FID	ERP (W)	HAAT	Class	FCC info
W224EM	92.7 FM	Annapolis, Maryland	154276	75	113 m (371 ft)	D	LMS
