= WBIS =

- Annapolis, Maryland; United States
- Broadcast area: Baltimore metropolitan area
- Frequency: 1190 kHz
- Branding: Business Radio 1190

Programming
- Affiliations: Bloomberg Radio; CBS News Radio; CNN Radio; Wall Street Journal Radio Network

Ownership
- Owner: Potomac Radio, LLC; (Nations Radio, LLC)

History
- First air date: March 1947
- Last air date: February 10, 2011
- Former call signs: WANN (1948–1998); WBIS (1998–2011); WCRW (2011)
- Call sign meaning: Business Information Station

Technical information
- Facility ID: 2297
- Class: D
- Power: 10,000 watts (daytime only; license); 875 watts (STA)
- Transmitter coordinates: 39°56′32.4″N 76°28′52.9″W; 39°59′0.4″N 76°31′19.9″W (STA)

Links
- Website: wbis1190.com

WBIS (1190 AM) was an American radio station broadcasting a News Talk Information format. Licensed to Annapolis, Maryland, United States, the station served the Baltimore metropolitan area. The station was last owned by Nations Radio, LLC (a subsidiary of Potomac Radio, LLC).

In early 2011, WBIS's callsign was briefly changed to WCRW. Two weeks later the station was deleted, in order clear the way for a Leesburg, Virginia station to expand its operations.

== History ==
The station was first licensed, as WANN in Annapolis, on March 6, 1947. The station's call sign was changed to WBIS (reflecting a "business" format) on September 21, 1998.

On May 16, 1960, WANN added a sister FM station: WANN-FM 107.9. WANN-FM is today’s WLZL.

From 2004 until its closure, WBIS operated under special temporary authority from the transmitter site of WNAV. As of April 2010, WBIS, along with WAGE in Leesburg, Virginia, effectively had the same ownership. On October 29, 2008, the Leesburg station received permission from the Federal Communications Commission (FCC) to move from 1200 to 1190 kHz and raise its power to 50 kW. On April 21, 2010, the FCC approved applications for WAGE to increase its daytime power to 50 kW and nighttime power to 1,300 watts from different antenna sites on the new frequency. A condition of the WAGE permit was that the WBIS license would be surrendered when WAGE began broadcasting on 1190 kHz.

The call sign WCRW was briefly parked on the Annapolis station beginning on January 28. On February 10, 2011, its license was cancelled, and the station was shut down, in order to make room for WAGE's move to expanded operations on 1190 kHz. (WAGE in Leesburg in turn changed its call sign to WCRW on April 7, 2011).
