= WRHS (FM) =

Radio station in Grasonville–Annapolis, Maryland

Coordinates: 38.944°N 76.178°W

Simulcast of WRBS-FM, Baltimore, Maryland
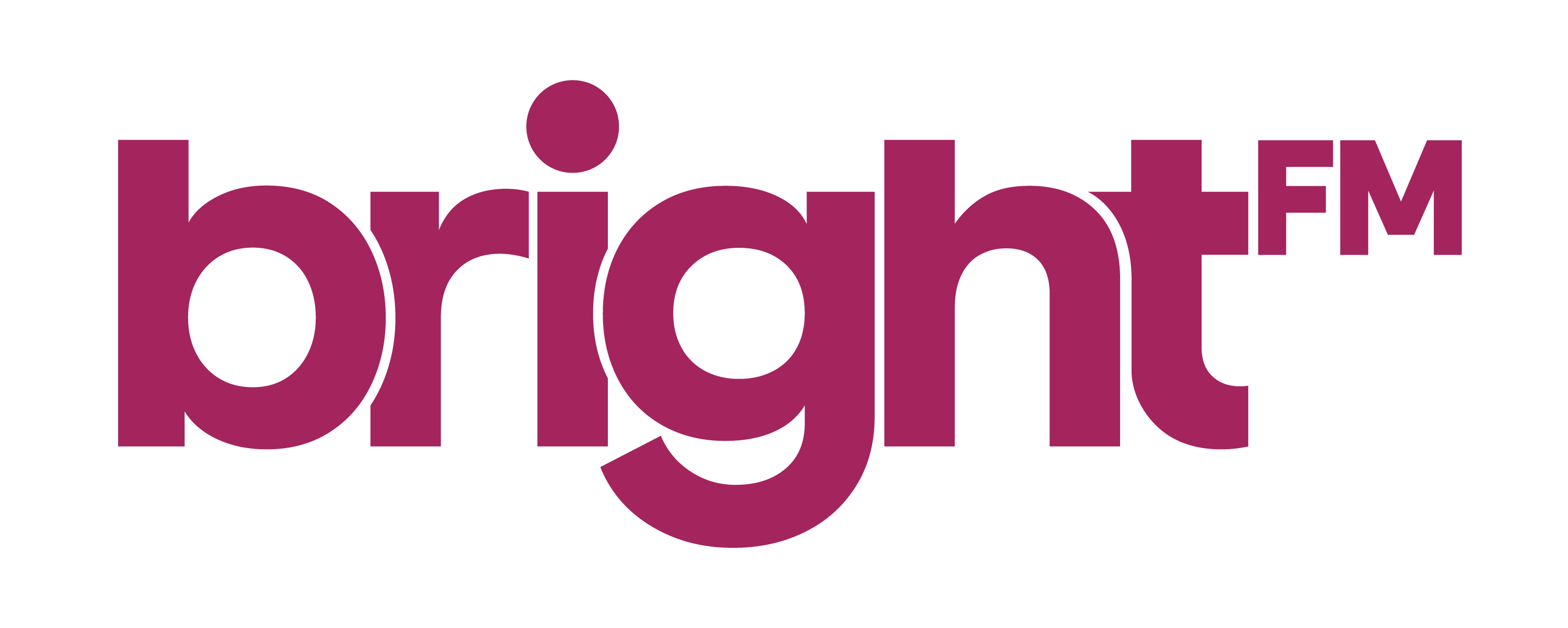
- Grasonville, Maryland; United States
- Broadcast area: Annapolis; Eastern Shore of Maryland
- Frequency: 103.1 MHz
- Branding: Bright-FM

Programming
- Format: Christian adult contemporary

Ownership
- Owner: Peter and John Radio Fellowship, Inc.; (Peter and John Fellowship Inc.)
- Sister stations: WRBS-FM; WRYS

History
- First air date: 1979
- Former call signs: WAQA (1978–1981); WBEY (1981–1991); WHVY (1991–1992); WXZL (1992–1994); WRNR-FM (1994–2023)

Technical information
- Licensing authority: FCC
- Facility ID: 70351
- Class: A
- ERP: 6,000 watts
- HAAT: 100 meters (330 ft)

Links
- Public license information: Public file; LMS
- Webcast: Listen live
- Website: www.brightfm.com

WRHS (103.1 MHz) is a non-commercial FM radio station licensed to Grasonville, Maryland, broadcasting mainly to the Annapolis - Anne Arundel County area and the Eastern Shore of Maryland. Owned by Peter & John Radio Fellowship, Inc., WRHS rebroadcasts the Christian adult contemporary format of co-owned WRBS-FM. The stations are branded on-air as Bright-FM. The studios and offices are off Commerce Drive near Interstate 95 in Halethorpe, Maryland, using a Baltimore address.

The transmitter is off Bennett Point Road in Graysonville, on Maryland's Eastern Shore of the Chesapeake Bay. It is a "Class A" FM radio station. Programming is also simulcast on 104.7 WRYS in Hagerstown.

== History ==
=== Early years (1979–1981) ===
WAQA signed on the air in 1979 and was founded by Edward Mason De Maso. The station aired a hot adult contemporary/Top 40 format known as Super Q103, with 3,000 watts from a tower at Kent Narrows, Maryland. The studio and tower were co-located.

=== Bay Country 103 (1981–1991) ===
In 1981, the call sign was changed to WBEY and the format flipped to country. The station was known as Bay Country 103.

=== 103.1 The Underground (1991–1992) ===
In early 1991, Vision Broadcasting purchased 103.1 and changed the call letters to WHVY and the format to active rock with an emphasis on heavy metal. The WHVY call letters and format were moved from low-power night-time-only non-commercial 96.7 in Baltimore (97 Underground) to 103.1. The studio was moved to Annapolis with a secondary studio maintained at the transmitter site.

=== Rock 103XZL (1992–1994) ===
In December 1992, the active rock format was tweaked some and the call letters were changed to WXZL. The station also increased its power to 6,000 watts from a new tower about 4 miles (6.4 km) east of the original tower location.

=== 103.1 WRNR (1994–2023) ===
The station changed its calls to WRNR-FM in 1994. Empire Broadcasting System acquired the station in 1997.

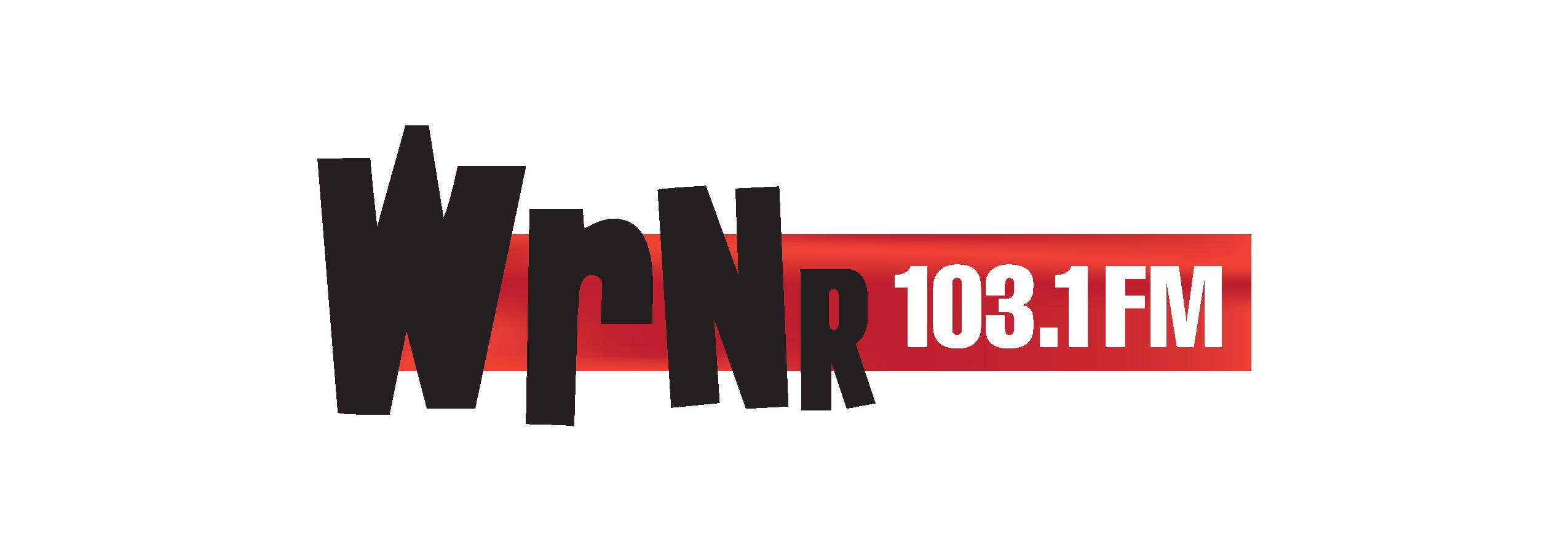
Final logo used under this era

During this era, WRNR-FM's studios were located in Annapolis on Admiral Cochrane Drive. The official music format for WRNR-FM was adult album alternative, but the station added a lot to that format musically with deep tracks of classic rock, new alternative rock, vintage alternative rock, reggae, roots rock, and more. They are credited as one of the radio stations that helped launch the bands "Wilco" and many others. WRNR-FM was one of the few independent radio stations in the Baltimore-Washington area.

DJs from WHFS that were also on WRNR were: Damian Einstein, Bob "Here" Showacre, Dave Issing, Bob Waugh, Rob Timm, and Janet Little. Other notable DJs on WRNR that are now on WTMD are Alex Cortright, Carrie Neumann, and Rob Timm.

On November 4, 2022, Empire announced it would sell WRNR-FM to Peter and John Ministries, the owners of Christian AC station WRBS-FM (known on air as Bright FM) and Christian talk station WRBS. Included in the sale was the station's frequency, its licenses, and most of its broadcasting equipment; excluded from the sale was the station's call sign, its format and IP, and its Annapolis studio, all of which station owner Steve Kingston claimed was to be moved to another frequency, with WSMD-FM's frequency already in mind. WRNR-FM's programming remained on the frequency until February 10, 2023, being replaced with messages encouraging listeners to download its app and listen on their website before Bright-FM took over. The sale was also consummated on February 10, at a price of $1.54 million. Peter and John took over all broadcast operations of the station the following day.

After continuing as an automated online stream for two years, in 2025 the WRNR-FM programming was relaunched on WYRE (810 AM) and FM translator W228ER (93.5 FM), which are branded "93.5 WRNR" in homage to the original station.

=== Bright-FM (2023–present) ===
Bright-FM programming arrived on WRNR-FM on February 11, 2023, with the station serving as a simulcast of WRBS-FM for Annapolis, the Eastern Shore of Maryland and Baltimore's northeast suburbs.

The main Bright-FM studios are located on Commerce Drive near Interstate 95 in Halethorpe, Maryland, using a Baltimore address. On February 16, 2023, the station changed its call sign to WRHS.
