= WJEJ =

Full service radio station in Hagerstown, Maryland

- Hagerstown, Maryland; United States
- Broadcast area: Hagerstown metropolitan area
- Frequency: 1240 kHz
- Branding: WJEJ

Programming
- Language: English
- Format: Full service adult standards; middle of the road; oldies
- Affiliations: Townhall News; Penn State Nittany Lions; Radio America

Ownership
- Owner: Hagerstown Broadcasting Company

History
- First air date: October 29, 1932
- Former frequencies: 1210 kHz (1932–1941)

Technical information
- Licensing authority: FCC
- Facility ID: 25828
- Class: C
- Power: 1,000 watts (unlimited)
- Transmitter coordinates: 39°40′0.0″N 77°43′30.0″W
- Translator: 104.3 W282CR (Hagerstown)

Links
- Public license information: Public file; LMS
- Webcast: Listen live
- Website: wjejradio.com

WJEJ (1240 AM) is a full service-formatted broadcast commercial radio station featuring adult standards, middle of the road and oldies music, broadcasting on 1240 AM and on 104.3 FM via translator W282CR. WJEJ is licensed to Hagerstown, Maryland, serving Eastern Washington County, Maryland. WJEJ is owned and operated by Hagerstown Broadcasting Company.

== History ==
WJEJ was Hagerstown's first radio station, with its license first granted on October 29, 1932, at 1:30 p.m., to operate on the frequency of 1210 kHz at a power output of 100 watts, daytime only. Studios and transmitter were located at the Alexander Hotel in Hagerstown.

The following month, the license was assigned from A.V. Tidmore to Hagerstown Broadcasting Company. In July 1934, Hagerstown Broadcasting Company received permission to move the transmitter facility from the Alexander Hotel to the Lovely Dame Building at 16 West Washington Street in Hagerstown. By the end of 1938, WJEJ was given 24-hour broadcasting rights, and by 1940, received authorization to increase its power from 100 to 250 watts. In 1941, under the NARBA frequency reallocation plan, WJEJ moved to its current frequency of 1240 kHz, but retained its operating power of 250 watts.

In 1947, WJEJ was joined by an FM sister station, WJEJ-FM, known today as WRYS.

In 1961, WJEJ increased its power to its current maximum level of 1,000 watts, unlimited time.

Logo before translator sign on
