= WRBS-FM =

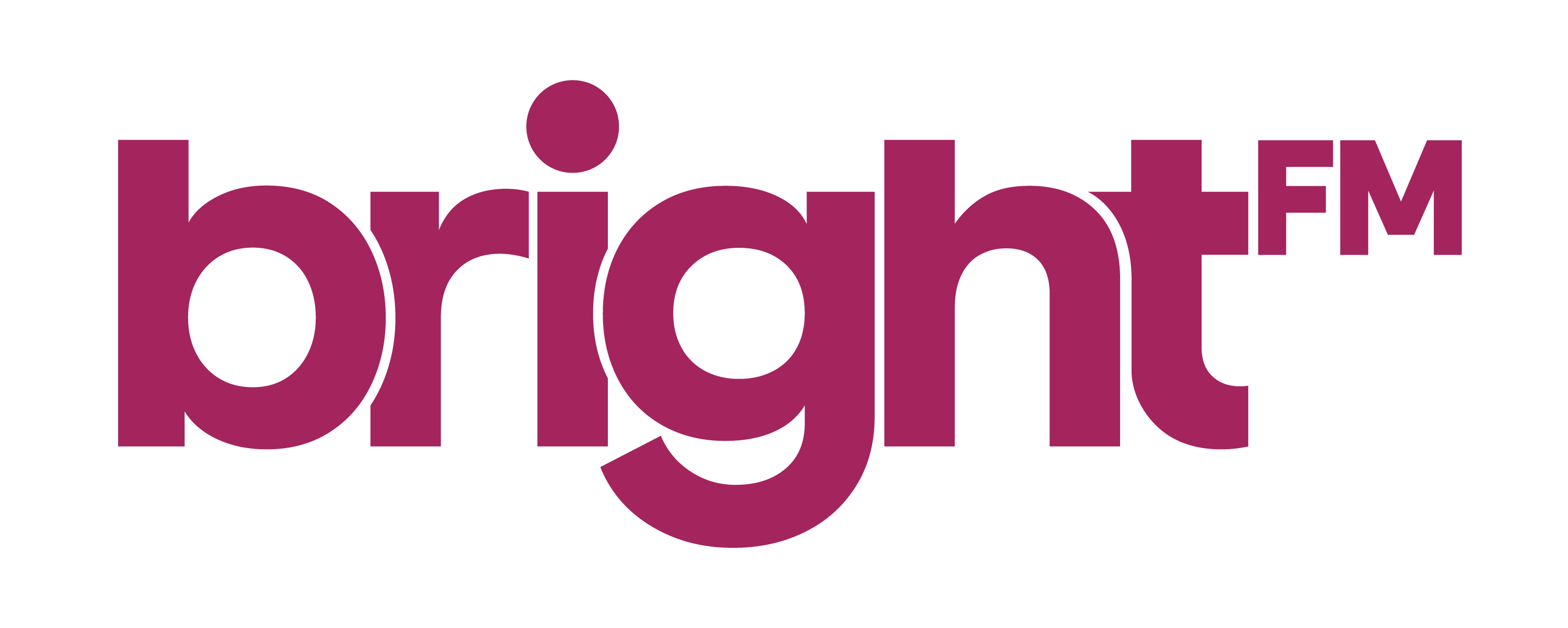

Baltimore, Maryland; United States
- Broadcast area: Baltimore metropolitan area
- Frequency: 95.1 MHz (HD Radio)
- Branding: Bright-FM

Programming
- Language: English
- Format: Christian adult contemporary
- Subchannels: HD2: Christian talk and teaching "WRBS-AM"

Ownership
- Owner: Peter & John Radio Fellowship, Inc
- Sister stations: WRHS; WRYS

History
- First air date: June 30, 1960
- Call sign meaning: Reynolds Broadcasting System (original owner)

Technical information
- Licensing authority: FCC
- Facility ID: 52353
- Class: B
- ERP: 50,000 watts
- HAAT: 152 meters (499 ft)
- Transmitter coordinates: 39.256°N 76.674°W
- Repeaters: 103.1 WRHS (Grasonville); 104.7 WRYS (Hagerstown)

Links
- Public license information: Public file; LMS
- Webcast: Listen live; HD2: Listen live
- Website: www.brightfm.com; HD2: wrbsam.com

WRBS-FM (95.1 MHz, "Bright-FM") is a radio station in Baltimore, Maryland, serving the Baltimore metropolitan area. The station broadcasts a Christian adult contemporary radio format and is owned by Peter & John Radio Fellowship, Inc.

WRBS-FM has an effective radiated power (ERP) of 50,000 watts, the maximum permitted for non-grandfathered FM stations in this region. Its studios and transmitter are co-located off Commerce Drive near Interstate 95 in Halethorpe, Maryland, using a Baltimore address. WRBS-FM broadcasts using HD Radio technology. The HD2 digital subchannel broadcasts the Christian talk and teaching programs formerly heard on WRBS (1230 AM), and is still branded "WRBS-AM".

== History ==
=== Peter & John Fellowship ===
In 1948, three young ministers Peter and John Bisset, and Paul Plack, created "The Peter, Paul and John Broadcast" to reach non-church goers during the week on WFBR (1300 AM), then one of Baltimore's most popular radio stations. The Bisset's were the youngest of five brothers whose family had emigrated from Scotland. Paul Plack was a singer who had met the brothers during his evangelistic tours.

Paul left the broadcast in 1952, and the program was renamed "The Peter and John Broadcast". The brothers continued to host the show until Peter's sudden death of a heart attack in 1995.

=== WRBS early years ===
On June 30, 1960, the station first signed on the air. It was owned by John B. Reynolds, who served as the general manager and commercial manager. The call sign WRBS was chosen to represent Reynolds Broadcasting Service.

At the time, it carried a classical music format, when few people owned FM receivers. It did not have an FM suffix because Reynolds did not own an AM sister station. The FM station stood alone.

=== Christian radio ===
In 1964, Peter & John Radio Fellowship acquired WRBS. The brothers upgraded WRBS's facilities in 1972. The station increased power to 50,000 watts, from 20,000 watts. It began broadcasting 24 hours daily coupled with a move from East Cold Spring Lane in Baltimore to its present site at 3500 Commerce Drive.

The station has been recognized as the first to air John MacArthur's sermons in the 1960s, later becoming the Bible teaching program Grace to You.

In 2006, Peter and John Radio Fellowship, Inc., acquired a Baltimore AM radio station, the former WITH (1230 AM) and changed its call sign to WRBS. The FM station is now licensed under the call letters WRBS-FM, using the FM suffix to distinguish it from the AM station. WRBS (AM) was sold in 2024 and is now WFOA; its previous programming remains on the second HD Radio channel of WRBS-FM.

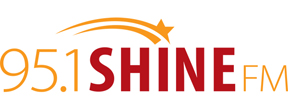
Logo as "Shine FM"

In August 2009, WRBS-FM was re-branded to feature contemporary Christian music, and began calling itself 95.1 Shine FM. On May 2, 2022, WRBS-FM rebranded as Bright-FM, after Olivet Nazarene University withdrew its license to use the Shine FM name.

On February 11, 2023, WRBS-FM began rebroadcasting on the 103.1 FM frequency previously occupied by adult album alternative station WRNR-FM, which it bought in November 2022. After the switch, its calls was changed to WRHS, with the station's city of license of Grasonville being retained.

In July 2025, Peter and John Radio Fellowship purchased country station WAYZ (104.7 FM), licensed to Hagerstown and serving a large swath of western Maryland, south-central Pennsylvania, northwestern Virginia and eastern West Virginia, for $3.1 million. That station's call sign changed to WRYS after the sale's closure.
