= WRNR (AM) =

- Martinsburg, West Virginia; United States
- Broadcast area: Eastern Panhandle of West Virginia
- Frequency: 740 kHz
- Branding: Talk Radio WRNR

Programming
- Language: English
- Format: News/talk and sports radio
- Affiliations: CBS News Radio; Pittsburgh Steelers; Radio America; Washington Capitals; Washington Commanders; Washington Nationals; Washington Wizards; Westwood One; Westwood One Sports

Ownership
- Owner: Shenandoah Communications, Inc.

History
- First air date: April 16, 1976
- Call sign meaning: Rock and roll (original format was Top 40)

Technical information
- Licensing authority: FCC
- Facility ID: 60104
- Class: D
- Power: 500 watts (day); 21 watts (night)
- Transmitter coordinates: 39°28′25.4″N 77°55′56.0″W
- Translator: see below

Links
- Public license information: Public file; LMS
- Webcast: Listen live
- Website: www.talkradiowrnr.com

WRNR (740 kHz) is a news/talk and sports radio station licensed to Martinsburg, West Virginia, serving the Eastern Panhandle of West Virginia. WRNR is owned and operated by Shenandoah Communications, Inc.

740 AM is a Canadian clear-channel frequency, on which CFZM in Toronto, is the dominant Class A station. WRNR must lower its wattage from sunset to sunrise to protect the nighttime signal of CFZM.

== Translator ==
In addition to the main station at 740 kHz, WRNR is relayed by an FM translator to widen its broadcast area.

Call sign	Frequency	City of license	FID	ERP (W)	Class	FCC info
W293AM	(106.5 FM) FM	Martinsburg, West Virginia	141656	102 watts	D	LMS
