= WFOA =

Spanish-language contemporary hit radio station in Baltimore

- Baltimore, Maryland; United States
- Broadcast area: Baltimore metropolitan area
- Frequency: 1230 kHz
- Branding: Maxima 94.3FM

Programming
- Language: Spanish
- Format: Contemporary hit radio and regional Mexican

Ownership
- Owner: Julio Arquinio; (BMax Media LLC)

History
- First air date: March 1, 1941
- Former call signs: WITH (1941–2006); WRBS (2006–2025)

Technical information
- Licensing authority: FCC
- Facility ID: 25527
- Class: C
- Power: 600 watts
- Transmitter coordinates: 39°18′6.4″N 76°34′7.9″W
- Translator: 94.3 W232CL (Baltimore)

Links
- Public license information: Public file; LMS
- Webcast: Listen live
- Website: maxima943fm.com

WFOA (1230 kHz) is a commercial AM radio station broadcasting a Spanish contemporary hit radio and regional Mexican format in Baltimore, Maryland. It is owned by Julio Arquinio's BMax Media LLC. The station went on the air in 1941, as WITH. It became WRBS, a Christian talk and teaching sister station to WRBS-FM, in 2006, and WFOA in 2025.

WFOA transmits with 600 watts, using a non-directional antenna. Programming is also heard on 100-watt FM translator W232CL on 94.3 MHz.

== History ==
=== WITH ===
The station signed on the air on March 1, 1941. Its original call sign was WITH, broadcasting with 250 watts power on 1200 kHz. It was owned and operated by Thomas Garland Tinsley and his family.

Opening ceremonies included "a broadcast from the stage of the Maryland Theater, featuring seven songwriters represented by the American Society of Composers, Authors and Musicians, which was fighting with the radio networks over copyrights." In 1941, it moved to 1230 kHz with the adoption of the North American Regional Broadcasting Agreement (NARBA).

=== WRBS ===
In 2006, the Peter and John Radio Fellowship, Inc. acquired WITH and changed its call sign to WRBS. The fellowship's existing FM station then became WRBS-FM.

As WRBS, the station aired Christian talk and teaching programs, such as David Jeremiah, John MacArthur and Alistair Begg, along with live call-in shows like The Ramsey Show with Dave Ramsey.

=== WFOA ===
Brighter Media Group sold WRBS to Julio Arquinio's BMax Media in October 2024 for $375,000. The previous Christian programming continues to air on the second HD Radio channel of WRBS-FM.

The new owners changed the call sign to WFOA on February 6, 2025. The station airs a Spanish language contemporary hit radio format, also heard over an FM translator on 94.3 MHz.
