= Annapolis, Maryland =

Capital city of Maryland, United States

Annapolis
- State capital
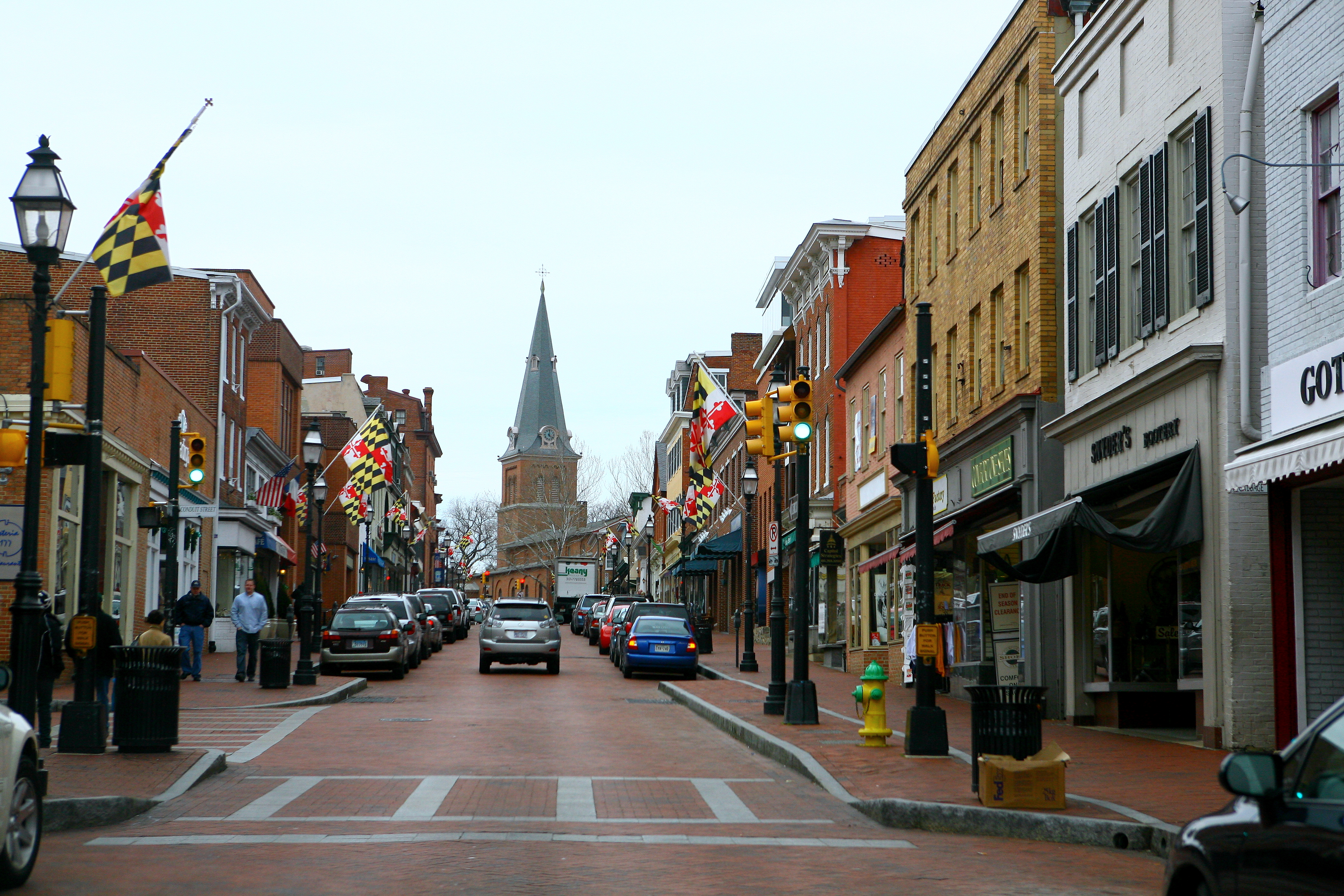
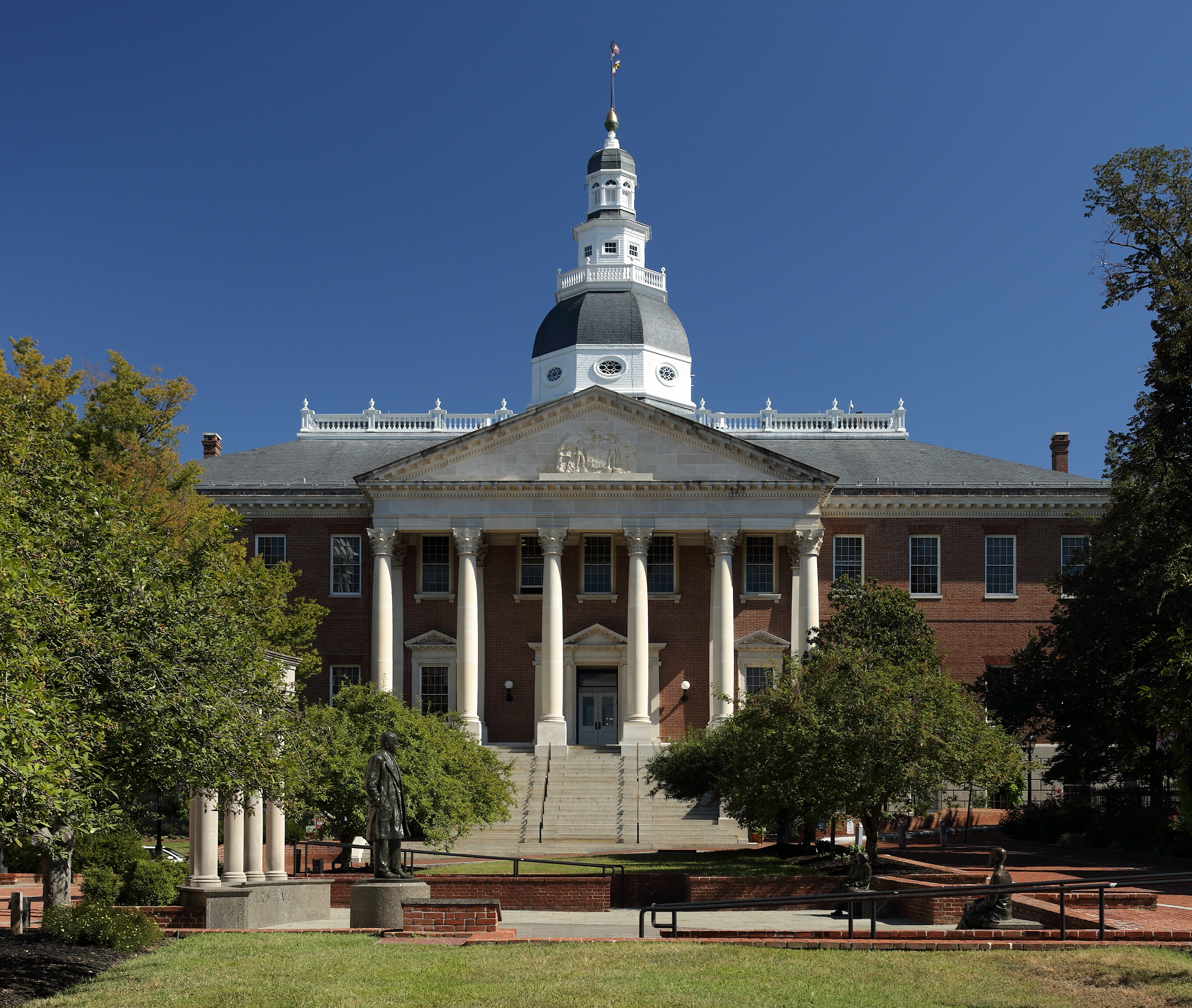
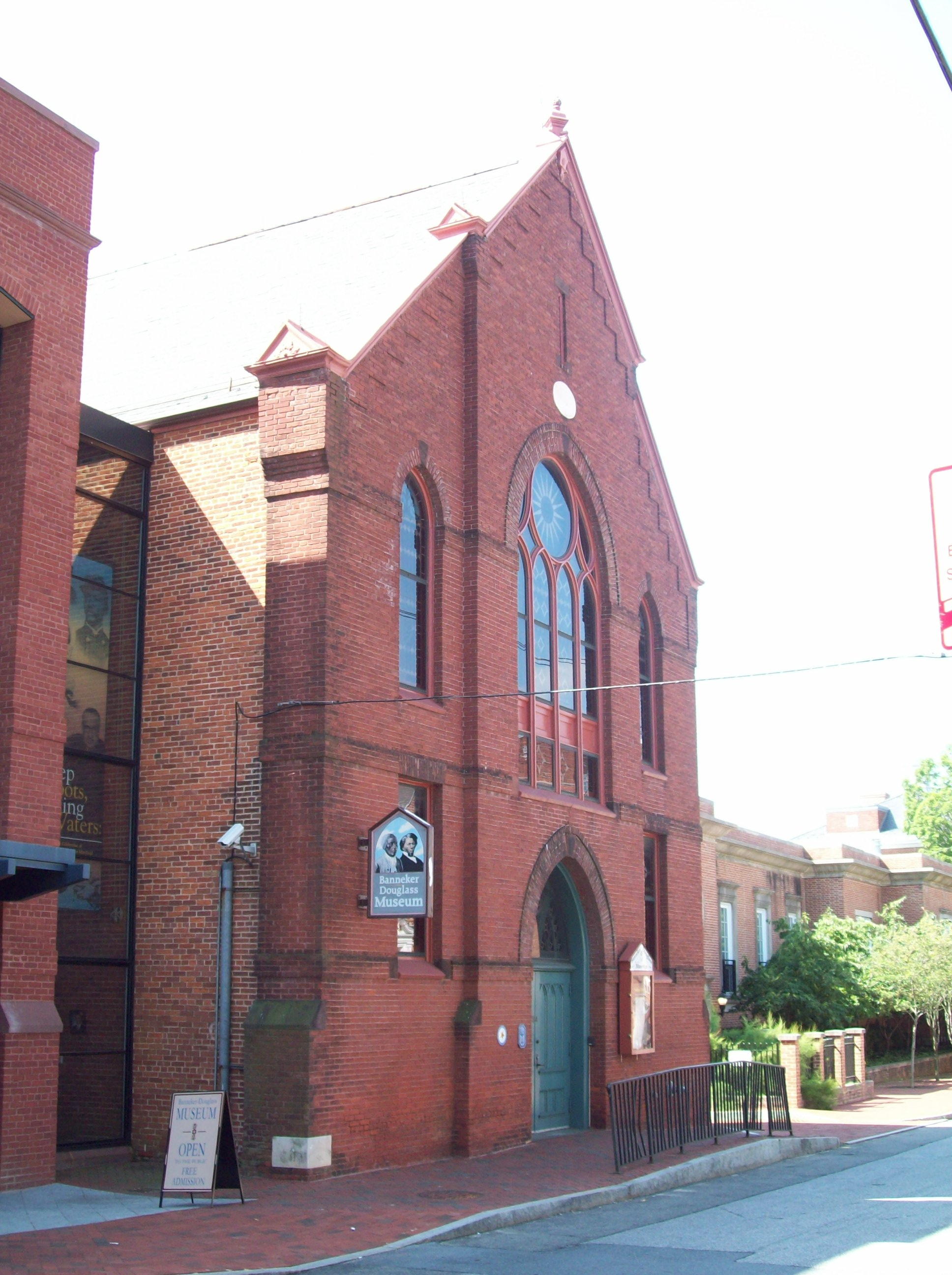
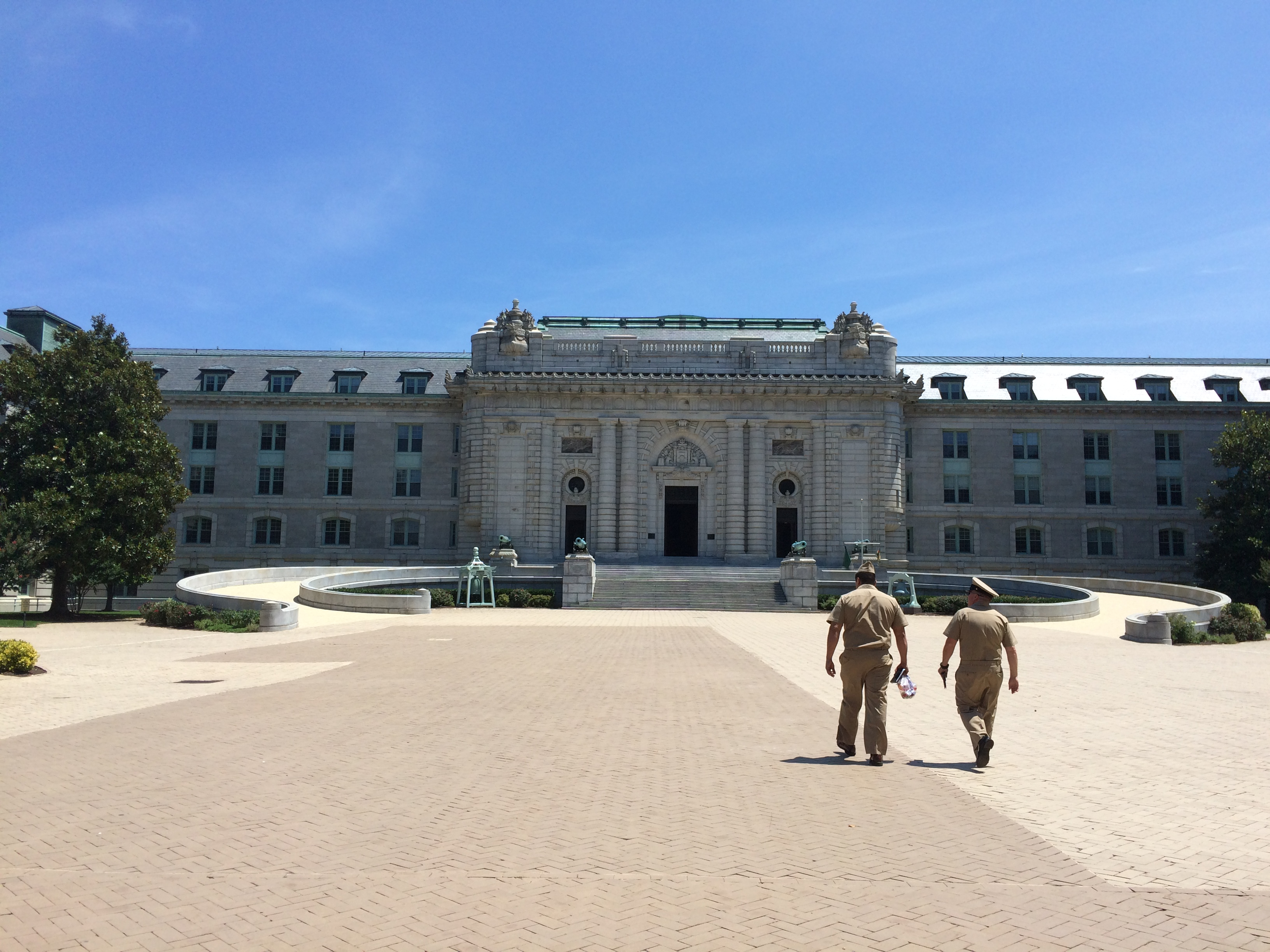
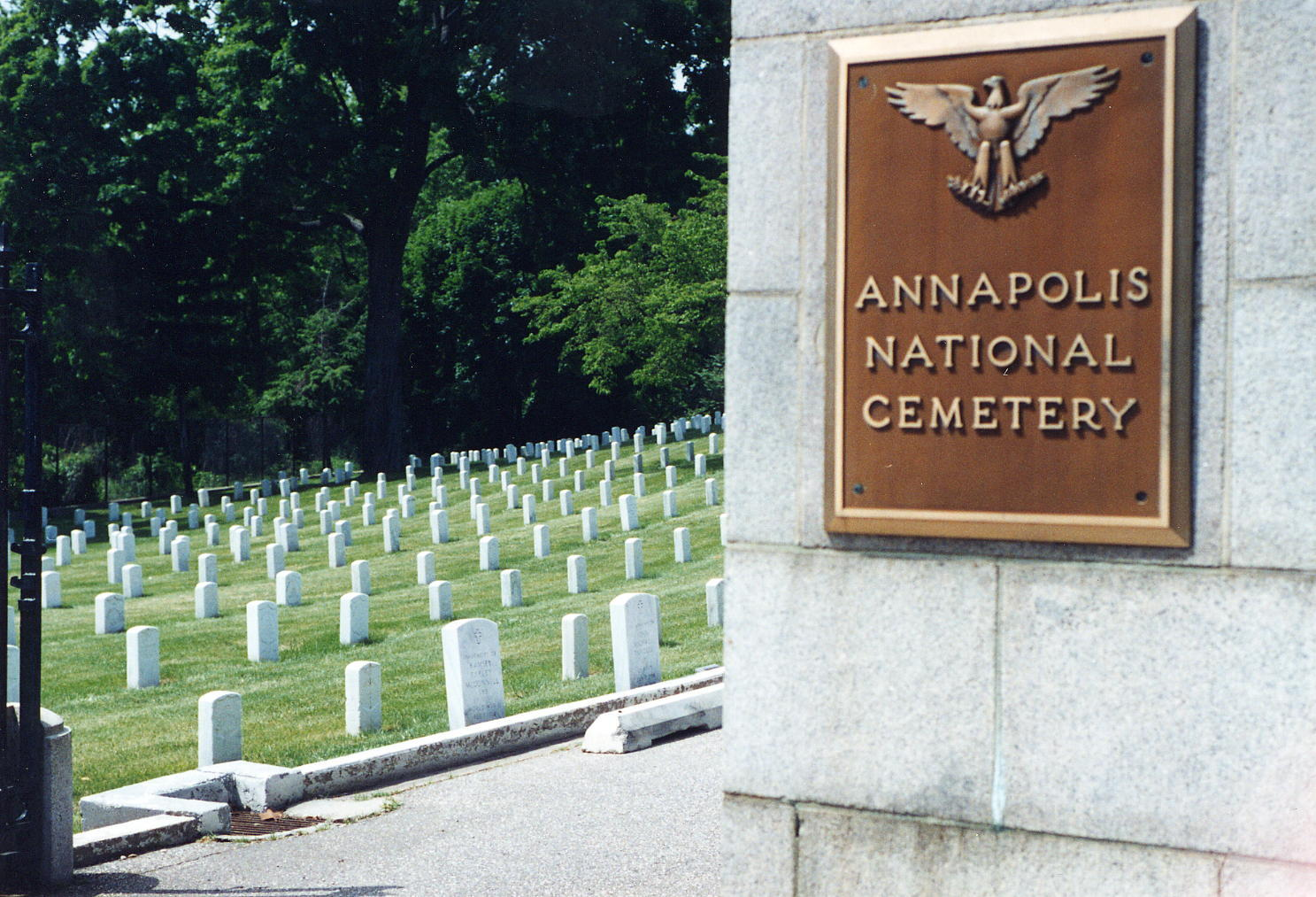
- Downtown Annapolis Maryland State House Banneker-Douglass-Tubman Museum Bancroft Hall Annapolis National Cemetery

- Flag Seal
- Nicknames: "America's Sailing Capital", "Sailing Capital of the World", "Naptown", "Crabtown on the Bay"
- Motto: "Vixi Liber Et Moriar" ("I have lived, and I shall die, free")
- Location within Anne Arundel County

- Location in Maryland Location in the United States
- Coordinates: 38°58′23″N 76°30′04″W
- Country: United States
- State: Maryland
- County: Anne Arundel
- Founded: 1649
- Incorporated: 1708
- Named for: Princess Anne of Denmark & Norway (later Anne, Queen of Great Britain)

Government
  - Type: Mayor–council
  - Body: Annapolis City Council
  - Mayor: Jared Littmann (D)
  - City council: Council members: Eleanor "Elly" Tierney (D); Karma O'Neill (D); Rhonda Pindell Charles (D); Sheila Finlayson (D); Brooks Schandelmeier (D); DaJuan Gay (D); Rob Savidge (D); Ross H. Arnett III (D)

Area
  - Total: 8.11 sq mi (21.01 km^{2})
  - Land: 7.20 sq mi (18.66 km^{2})
  - Water: 0.90 sq mi (2.34 km^{2})
- Elevation: 43 ft (13 m)

Population (2020)
  - Total: 40,812
  - Density: 5,663.4/sq mi (2,186.66/km^{2})
- Demonym: Annapolitan
- Time zone: UTC−5 (EST)
  - Summer (DST): UTC−4 (EDT)
- ZIP Codes: 21401-21405, 21409, 21411-21412
- Area codes: 410, 443, and 667
- FIPS code: 24-01600
- GNIS feature ID: 595031
- Website: www.annapolis.gov

Annapolis (/əˈnæpəlɪs/ ə-NAP-əl-iss) is the capital of the U.S. state of Maryland. It is the county seat of Anne Arundel County and its only incorporated city. Situated on the Chesapeake Bay at the mouth of the Severn River, Annapolis is a historic city with a strong maritime culture. It is 25 miles (40 km) south of Baltimore and about 30 miles (50 km) east of Washington, D.C., forming part of the Baltimore–Washington metropolitan area. The 2020 census recorded its population as 40,812, an increase of 6.3% since 2010.

This city served as the seat of the Confederation Congress, formerly the Second Continental Congress, and temporary national capital of the United States in 1783–1784. At that time, General George Washington came before the body convened in the new Maryland State House and resigned his commission as commander of the Continental Army. A month later, the Congress ratified the Treaty of Paris of 1783, ending the American Revolutionary War, with Great Britain recognizing the independence of the United States. The city and state capitol was also the site of the 1786 Annapolis Convention, which issued a call to the states to send delegates for the Constitutional Convention to be held the following year in Philadelphia. The Annapolis Peace Conference took place in 2007.

Annapolis is the home of St. John's College, founded 1696. The U.S. Naval Academy, established 1845, is adjacent to the city limits. Known as "America's Sailing Capital", Annapolis is a major hub of recreational boating and hosts the world's largest in-water sailboat show each year.

== History ==
=== Colonial and early United States (1649–1808) ===
Annapolis's first official flag, though not adopted until January 1965, is styled after the personal royal badge of British Queen Anne after whom the city was named. It resembles the floral badge of Great Britain: a crown hovers over a thistle (representing Scotland) and a rose (representing England), growing from a single stalk to portray their 1706-07 union during Anne's reign. Vixi liber et moriar means "I have lived free and will die so".

A settlement in the Province of Maryland named "Providence" was founded on the north shore of the Severn River on the middle Western Shore of the Chesapeake Bay in 1649 by Puritan exiles from the Province/Dominion of Virginia led by the third Proprietary Governor of Maryland, William Stone (1603–1660). The settlers later moved to a better-protected harbor on the Severn's southern shore. The settlement on the south shore, known from 1683 as "Town at Proctor's", then "Town at the Severn", became in 1694 "Anne Arundel's Towne" (after Lady Anne Arundell (1616–1649), the late wife of the late Cecilius Calvert, second Lord Baltimore, 1605–1675).

In 1654, after the Third English Civil War, Parliamentary forces assumed control of the Maryland colony and Stone went into exile south across the Potomac River in Virginia. Per orders from Lord Baltimore, Stone returned the following spring at the head of a Cavalier royalist force, loyal to the uncrowned King of England. On March 25, 1655, in what became known as the Battle of the Severn (the first colonial naval battle in North America), Stone was defeated, taken prisoner, and replaced by Lt. Gen. Josias Fendall (1628–1687) as fifth Proprietary Governor. Fendall governed Maryland during the latter half of the English Commonwealth period. In 1660, he was replaced by Phillip Calvert (1626–1682) as fifth/sixth Governor of Maryland, after the restoration of Charles II (1630–1685) as King in England.

In 1694, soon after the overthrow of the Catholic government of second Royal Governor Thomas Lawrence (1645–1714, in office for a few months in 1693), the third Royal Governor Francis Nicholson (1655-1727/28, in office: 1694–1698), moved the capital of the royal colony, the Province of Maryland, to Anne Arundel's Towne and renamed the town "Annapolis" after Princess Anne of Denmark and Norway, soon to become Queen Anne of Great Britain (1665–1714, reigned 1702–1714). Annapolis was incorporated as a city in 1708. Colonel John Seymour, the Governor of Maryland from 1704 to 1709, wrote Queen Anne on March 16, 1709, with qualifications for municipal officials and provisions for fairs and market days for the town.

In the 17th century, Annapolis was little more than a village, but it grew rapidly for most of the 18th century until the American Revolutionary War as a political and administrative capital, a port of entry, and a major center of the Atlantic slave trade. The Maryland Gazette, which became an important weekly journal, was founded there by Jonas Green in 1745; in 1769 a theater opened; during this period also the commerce was considerable, but it declined rapidly after Baltimore, with its deeper harbor, was made a port of entry in 1780. Water trades such as oyster-packing, boatbuilding and sailmaking became the city's chief industries. Annapolis is home to a large number of recreational boats that have largely replaced the seafood industry in the city.

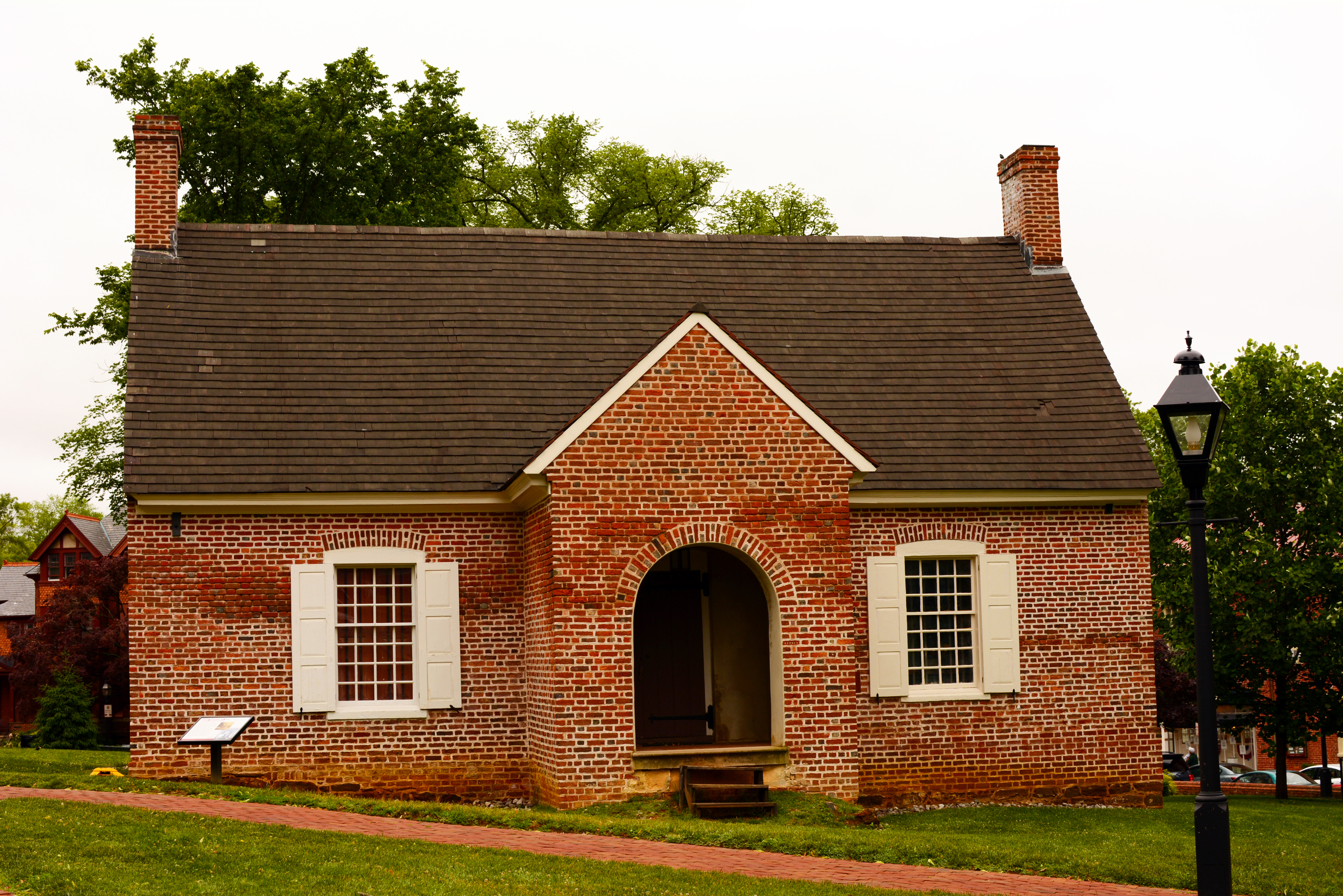
The "Old Treasury Building" on State Circle (adjacent the Maryland State House) was built in 1735 and is the oldest extant government building in Annapolis.

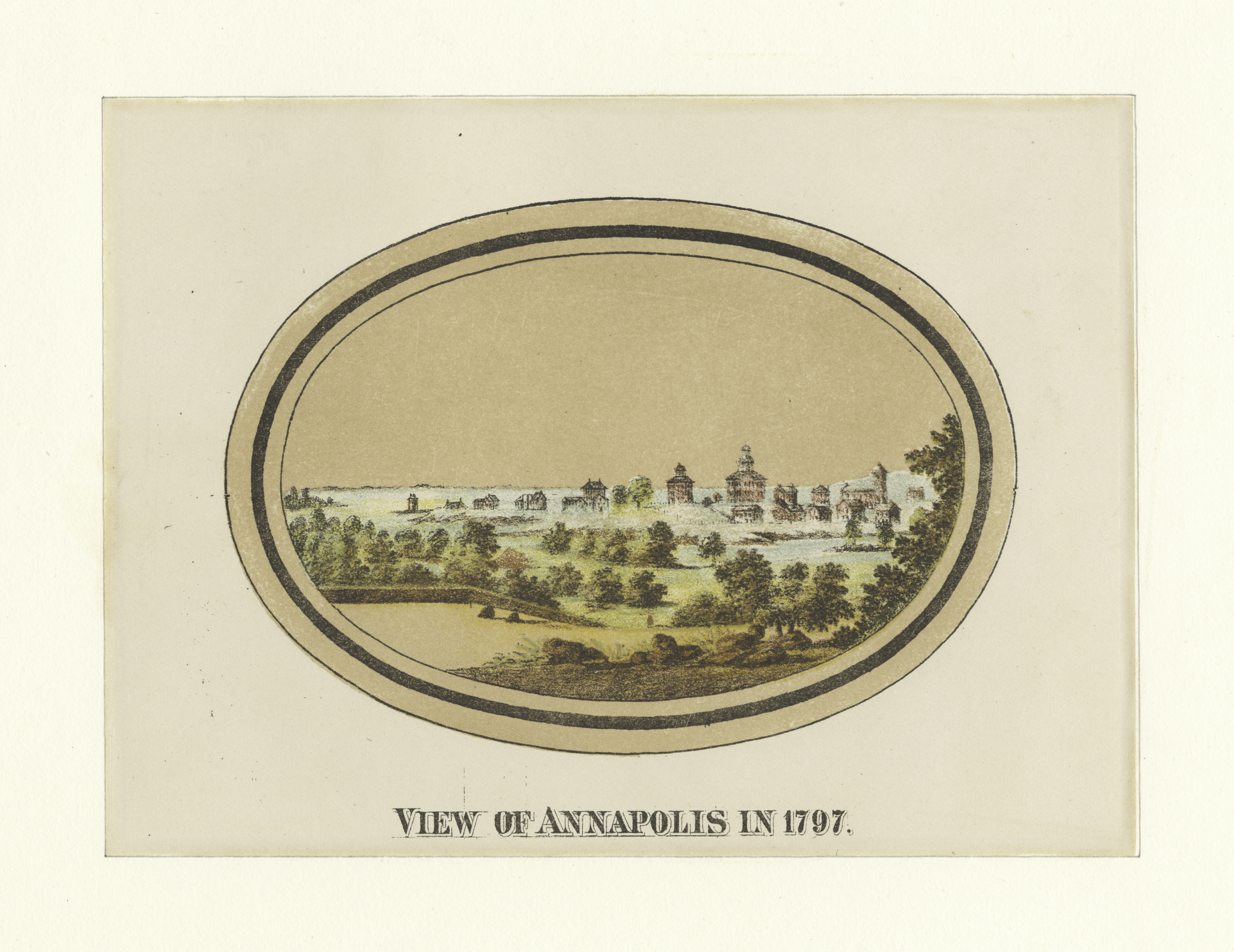
View of Annapolis in 1797, New York Public Library

Dr. Alexander Hamilton (1712–1756), a Scottish-born doctor and writer, lived and worked in Annapolis. Leo Lemay says his 1744 travel diary Gentleman's Progress: The Itinerarium of Dr. Alexander Hamilton is "the best single portrait of men and manners, of rural and urban life, of the wide range of society and scenery in colonial America."

Annapolis became the temporary capital of the United States after the signing of the Treaty of Paris in 1783. Congress was in session in the state house from November 26, 1783, to August 19, 1784, and it was in Annapolis on December 23, 1783, that General Washington resigned his commission as commander-in-chief of the Continental Army.

For the 1783 Congress, the Governor of Maryland commissioned John Shaw, a local cabinetmaker, to create an American flag. Shaw's flag is slightly different from other designs of the time: the blue field extends over the entire height of the hoist. Shaw developed two versions of the flag: one which started with a red stripe and another that started with a white one.

In 1786, delegates from all states of the Union were invited to meet in Annapolis to consider measures for the better regulation of commerce. Delegates from only five states—New York, Pennsylvania, Virginia, New Jersey, and Delaware—actually attended the September 1786 gathering, known afterward as the Annapolis Convention. Without proceeding to the business for which they had met, the delegates passed a resolution calling for another convention to meet at Philadelphia in the following year to amend the Articles of Confederation. The resulting Philadelphia Convention drafted and approved the Constitution of the United States, which remains in force.

=== Civil War era (1849 – late 1800s) ===
On April 24, 1861, the midshipmen of the Naval Academy relocated their base in Annapolis and were temporarily housed in Newport, Rhode Island, until October 1865.

In 1861, the first of three camps that were built for holding paroled soldiers was created on the campus of St. John's College. The second location of Camp Parole would house over 20,000 and would be located where Forest Drive is currently. The third and final location was finished in late 1863 and would be placed near the Elkridge Railroad, as to make transportation of soldiers and resources easier before and allowing the camp to grow to its highest numbers. This area just west of the city is still referred to as Parole. The soldiers who did not survive were buried in the Annapolis National Cemetery.

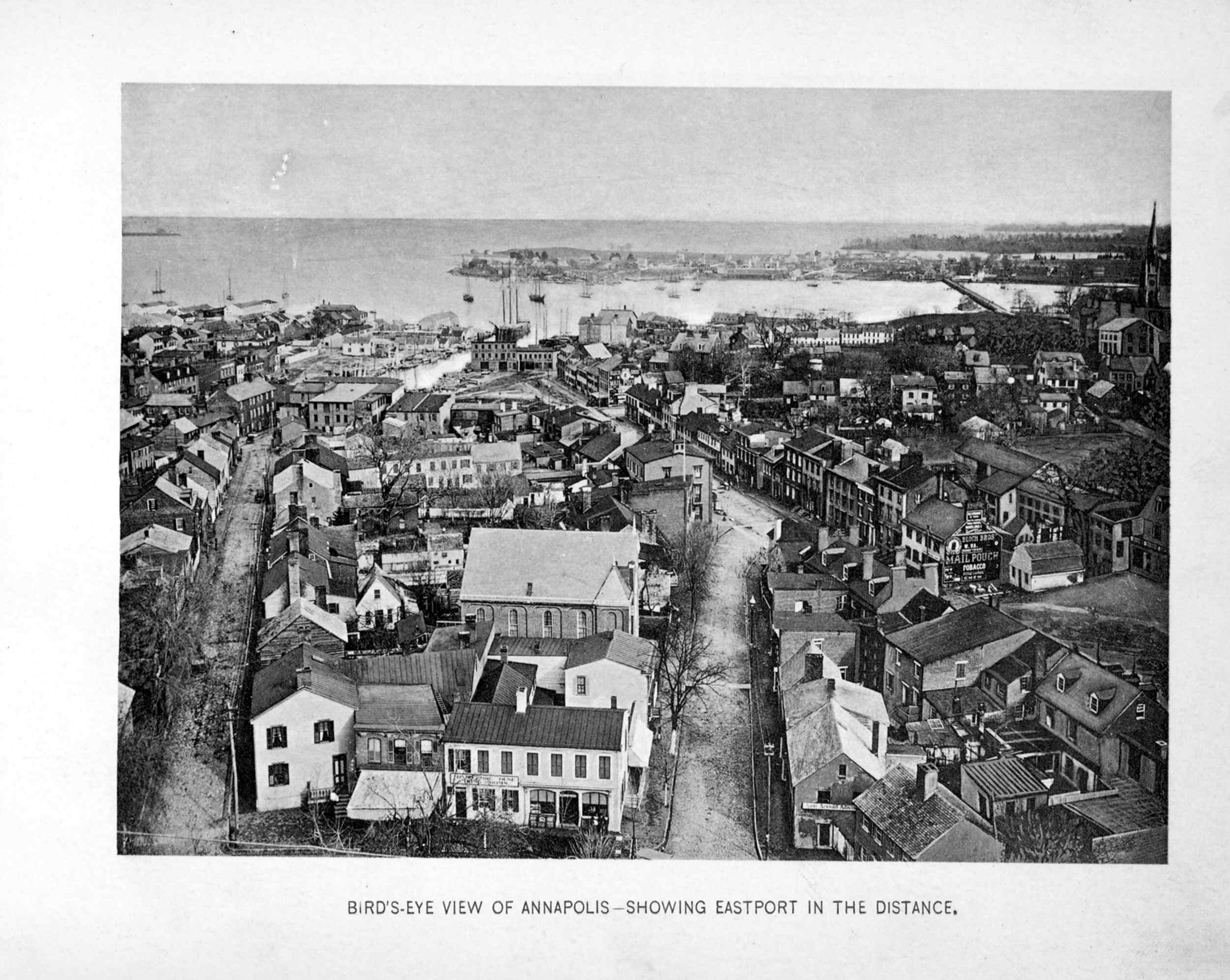
1896 Annapolis view

=== Contemporary era ===
In 1900, Annapolis had a population of 8,585. On December 21, 1906, Henry Davis was lynched in the city. He was suspected of assaulting a local woman. Nobody was ever tried for the crime.

During World War II, shipyards in Annapolis built a number of PT Boats, and military vessels such as minesweepers and patrol boats were built in Annapolis during the Korean and Vietnam wars. It was at Annapolis in July 1940 that Grand Duchess Charlotte of Luxembourg arrived in exile during World War II.

In the summer of 1984, the Navy Marine Corps Memorial Stadium in Annapolis hosted soccer games as part of the XXIII Olympiad.

On September 18–19, 2003, Hurricane Isabel created the largest storm surge known in Annapolis's history, cresting at 7.58 feet (2.31 m). Much of downtown Annapolis was flooded and many businesses and homes in outlying areas were damaged. The previous record was 6.35 feet (1.94 m) during a hurricane in 1933, and 5.5 feet (1.7 m) during Hurricane Hazel in 1954. Downtown Annapolis has high-tide "sunny day" flooding. A Stanford University study found that this resulted in 3,000 fewer visits and $172,000 in lost revenue for local business in 2017.

From mid-2007 through December 2008, the city celebrated the 300th anniversary of its 1708 Royal Charter, which established democratic self-governance. The many cultural events of this celebration were organized by Annapolis Charter 300.

Annapolis was home of the Anne Arundel County Battle of the Bands, which was held at Maryland Hall from 1999 to 2015. The event was a competition between musical groups from each high school in the county; it raised over $100,000 for the county's high school music programs during its 17-year run.

On June 28, 2018, at the Capital Gazette, a gunman killed five journalists and injured two more.

An EF-2 tornado struck the western edge of the city on September 1, 2021, during the remnants of Hurricane Ida. Homes, businesses, and restaurants had significant damage near Maryland Route 450, where EF-2 damage was observed with estimated winds of 125 mph (201 km/h). The tornado dissipated immediately past U.S. Route 50 and U.S. Route 301.

==== 2007 Annapolis Conference ====
As announced by United States Secretary of State Condoleezza Rice, Annapolis was the venue for a Middle East summit dealing with the Israeli–Palestinian peace process, with the participation of Israeli Prime Minister Ehud Olmert, Palestinian President Mahmoud Abbas ("Abu Mazen"), and various other leaders from the region. The conference was held at the United States Naval Academy on November 26, 2007.

=== Historic institutions ===
==== The State House ====
The Maryland State House is the oldest in continuous legislative use in the United States. Construction started in 1772, and the Maryland legislature first met there in 1779. It is topped by the largest wooden dome built without nails in the country. The Maryland State House housed the workings of the United States government from November 26, 1783, to August 13, 1784, and the Treaty of Paris was ratified there on January 14, 1784, so Annapolis became the first peacetime capital of the U.S.

It was in the Maryland State House that George Washington famously resigned his commission before the Continental Congress on December 23, 1783.

==== United States Naval Academy ====
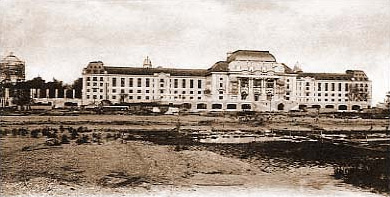
US Naval Academy, Bancroft Hall, c. 1908

The United States Naval Academy was founded in 1845 on the site of Fort Severn, and now occupies an area of land reclaimed from the Severn River. Students who attend the Naval Academy are enrolled for four years with a following five-year commitment to serving on active duty in the Marine Corps or Navy. Students hold the naval rank of midshipman, and on average about 4,500 are enrolled.

==== St. John's College ====
St. John's College is a non-sectarian private college that was once supported by the state. It was opened in 1789 as the successor of King William's School, which was founded by an act of the Maryland legislature in 1696 and was opened in 1701. Its principal building, McDowell Hall, was originally to be the governor's mansion; although £4,000 was appropriated to build it in 1742, it was not completed until after the War of Independence.

== Geography ==
Located 25 miles (40 km) south of Baltimore and 30 miles (48 km) east of Washington, D.C., Annapolis is the closest state capital to the national capital. In land area, Annapolis (proper) is also the smallest of the United States capital cities.

=== Climate ===
Climate chart for Annapolis

The city is a part of the Atlantic Coastal Plain, and is relatively flat, with the highest point being only 50 feet (15 m) above sea level.

According to the United States Census Bureau, the city has a total area of 8.10 square miles (20.98 km^{2}), of which 7.18 square miles (18.60 km^{2}) is land and 0.92 square miles (2.38 km^{2}) is water.

Annapolis lies within the humid subtropical climate zone (Köppen: Cfa), with hot, humid summers (up to 30°C/86°F), cool winters (low as -1.2°C/29.8°F), and generous precipitation (ranges from 60 millimeters/2.38 inches to 131 millimeters/5.14 inches) year-round. Low elevation and proximity to the Chesapeake Bay give the area more moderate spring and summertime temperatures and slightly less extreme winter lows than locations further inland, such as Washington, D.C.

Climate data for Annapolis, Maryland (Note: The main weather station of Annapolis is located in Naval Academy. For details, please refer to the specific information of the weather station.) (1991–2020 normals, (Note: Mean monthly maxima and minima (i.e. the expected highest and lowest temperature readings at any point during the year or given month) calculated based on data at said location from 1991 to 2020.) extremes 1894–present (Note: For more information, see xmACIS2))
Month	Jan	Feb	Mar	Apr	May	Jun	Jul	Aug	Sep	Oct	Nov	Dec	Year
Record high °F (°C)	77 (25)	83 (28)	92 (33)	95 (35)	98 (37)	103 (39)	105 (41)	106 (41)	99 (37)	94 (34)	85 (29)	78 (26)	106 (41)
Mean maximum °F (°C)	65.0 (18.3)	64.9 (18.3)	75.1 (23.9)	84.3 (29.1)	89.5 (31.9)	93.8 (34.3)	96.3 (35.7)	94.6 (34.8)	89.4 (31.9)	82.7 (28.2)	73.9 (23.3)	65.2 (18.4)	97.5 (36.4)
Mean daily maximum °F (°C)	43.1 (6.2)	45.2 (7.3)	53.1 (11.7)	63.7 (17.6)	73.0 (22.8)	81.5 (27.5)	86.0 (30.0)	83.7 (28.7)	77.4 (25.2)	67.1 (19.5)	56.2 (13.4)	47.2 (8.4)	64.8 (18.2)
Daily mean °F (°C)	36.5 (2.5)	38.4 (3.6)	45.7 (7.6)	55.4 (13.0)	65.1 (18.4)	74.6 (23.7)	79.0 (26.1)	77.1 (25.1)	71.1 (21.7)	59.7 (15.4)	49.3 (9.6)	40.6 (4.8)	57.7 (14.3)
Mean daily minimum °F (°C)	29.8 (−1.2)	31.5 (−0.3)	38.3 (3.5)	47.2 (8.4)	57.3 (14.1)	67.7 (19.8)	71.9 (22.2)	70.5 (21.4)	64.8 (18.2)	52.2 (11.2)	42.3 (5.7)	34.1 (1.2)	50.7 (10.4)
Mean minimum °F (°C)	13.1 (−10.5)	15.3 (−9.3)	22.3 (−5.4)	33.7 (0.9)	43.5 (6.4)	54.3 (12.4)	63.0 (17.2)	61.4 (16.3)	51.6 (10.9)	37.7 (3.2)	27.8 (−2.3)	20.3 (−6.5)	11.0 (−11.7)
Record low °F (°C)	−8 (−22)	−6 (−21)	10 (−12)	13 (−11)	32 (0)	35 (2)	50 (10)	46 (8)	37 (3)	26 (−3)	13 (−11)	−1 (−18)	−8 (−22)
Average precipitation inches (mm)	2.84 (72)	2.38 (60)	3.80 (97)	3.38 (86)	3.15 (80)	4.04 (103)	4.94 (125)	4.27 (108)	5.14 (131)	4.04 (103)	3.03 (77)	2.98 (76)	43.99 (1,117)
Average precipitation days (≥ 0.01 in)	9.0	9.0	11.0	11.0	12.0	11.0	12.0	11.0	10.0	9.0	8.0	10.0	116.0
Source: NOAA

Climate data for Annapolis
Month	Jan	Feb	Mar	Apr	May	Jun	Jul	Aug	Sep	Oct	Nov	Dec	Year
Average sea temperature °F (°C)	46.7 (8.2)	45.1 (7.3)	46.0 (7.8)	51.5 (10.8)	57.4 (14.1)	69.1 (20.6)	76.1 (24.5)	77.8 (25.4)	73.9 (23.3)	66.7 (19.3)	57.9 (14.4)	51.7 (10.9)	60.0 (15.6)
Mean daily daylight hours	9.8	10.8	12.0	13.3	14.3	14.9	14.6	13.6	12.4	11.2	10.1	9.5	12.2
Source: Weather Atlas

=== Flooding ===
Sea level in Annapolis has risen about 15 inches (38 cm) over the course of a single century.

More frequent tidal flooding (flooding not related to storms) results from sea level rise caused by climate change.

In November 2020, NASA reported that Annapolis had 18 days of high-tide (non-storm-related) flooding from May 2019 to April 2020, an increase over 2018's 12 days, and higher than the 1995-2005 average of 2 days annually. The increase is attributed to sea level rise caused by climate change. Resultant flood damages caused local businesses to lose as much as $172,000 a year. On Naval Academy grounds, seawater came out of storm drains, with McNair Road and Ramsay Road flooding 20 times in 2020 and more than 40 times each in 2018 and 2019. Though a $37 million sea wall was completed in 2024 to adapt to flooding occurring 30 to 40 times a year, adaptation approaches such as sea walls and building up the height of roadways and athletic fields are predicted to be effective for only a few decades.

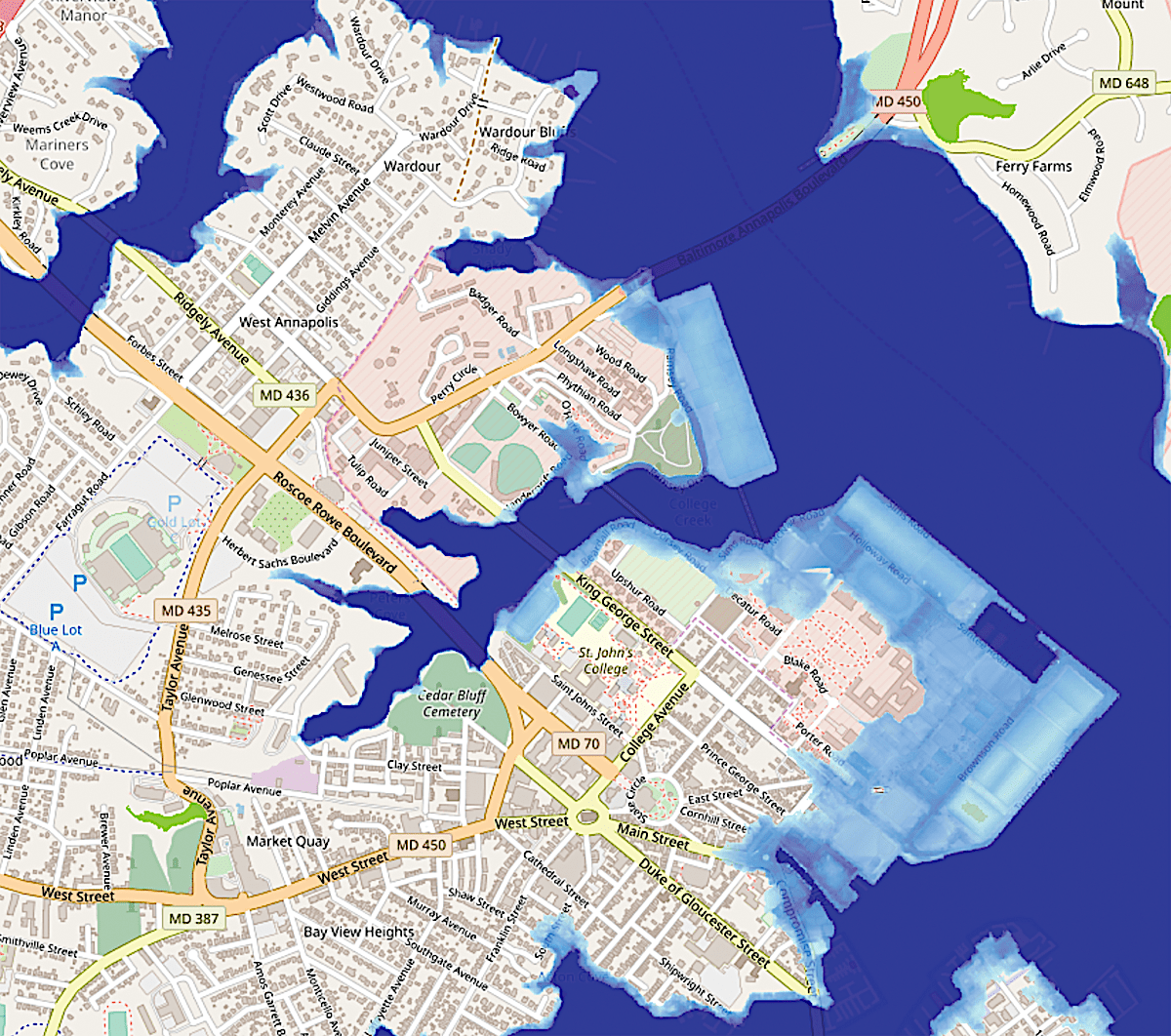
The National Oceanic and Atmospheric Administration (NOAA) projects that by 2100, the areas in light blue will be under water if action to mitigate climate change is not taken.

Annapolis has seen the highest increased rate of coastal flooding in the country. The Naval Academy is especially vulnerable to sea rise, as it is surrounded on three sides by water, and has some land only three feet above the 2019 water line. Hurricanes—which have been increasing in intensity because of global warming—pose additional flooding threats, with Hurricane Isabel having caused $100 million in flood damage in 2003. The Academy's Sea Level Rise Advisory Council has created a climate change adaptation plan including seawall repair, door dams, doorway barriers, backflow preventers in storm drain systems, and elevated building entrances.

After 2024's record 120 flooding events, on November 3, 2025, ground was broken on an $87 million City Dock Project designed to protect against expected flooding events through 2060. Specifically, the goal is to protect against flood waters up to 8.77 feet (2.67 m) above the daily average lowest level of the water—higher than the 7.2 feet (2.2 m) experienced during 2003's Hurricane Isabel. The plan involves adding floodgates, raising land to block rising water levels, installing a park, and constructing a Maritime Welcome Center.

=== Neighborhoods and suburbs ===
- Admiral Heights
- Arnold
- Arundel on the Bay
- Cape St. Claire
- Church Circle and St. Anne's Church (Episcopal /Anglican), central Annapolis with Anne Arundel County Courthouse (1812) with series of rear annexes.
- Crofton
- Crownsville
- Eastport
- Edgewater
- Highland Beach
- Gambrills
- Hillsmere Shores
- Londontowne
- Main Street, City Dock and City Markethouse on waterfront
- Millersville
- Naval Academy
- Odenton
- Parole - Former site of Civil War era prisoner-of-war exchange of Camp Parole, 1861–1865, later 20th century residential and commercial development including first area shopping center of Parole Center in 1960s.
- Riva
- St. Margaret's
- State Circle and Maryland Avenue - Site of Maryland State House (Capitol) of 1770s-1780s with adjacent state office buildings for General Assembly (state legislature), executive departments, Lawyer's Mall civic plaza along Bladen Boulevard and Government House (Governor's Mansion) and U.S. Post Office building for Annapolis
- West Annapolis
- West Street / Arts District
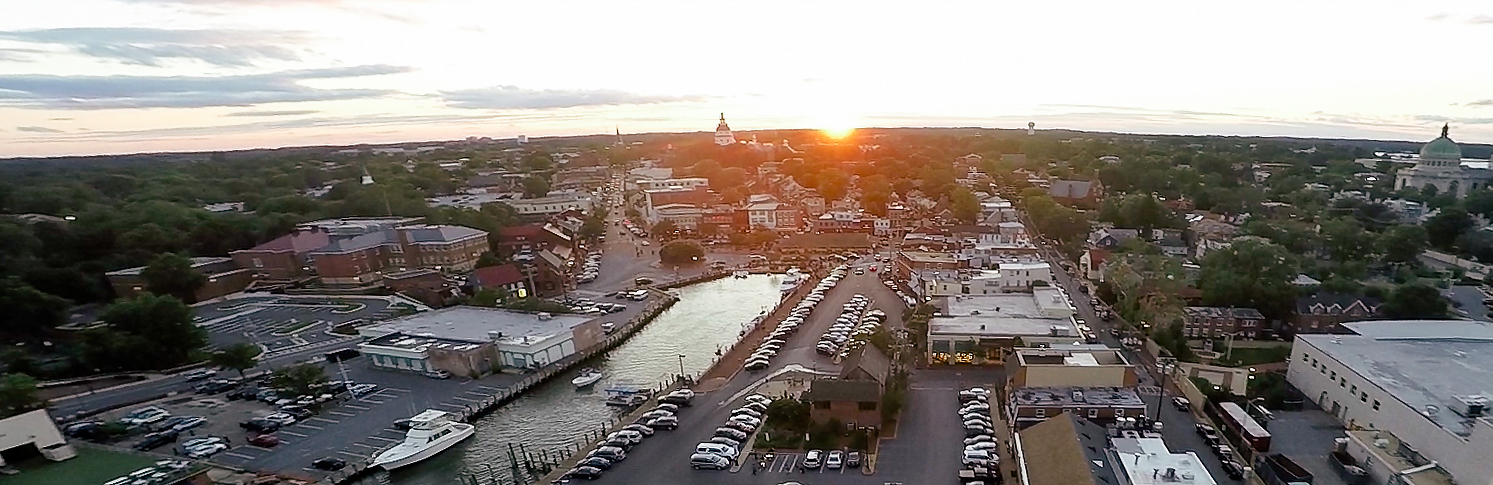
Annapolis, Maryland

== Demographics ==
Historical population
Census	Pop.	Note	%±
1820	2,260		—
1830	2,623		16.1%
1840	2,792		6.4%
1850	3,011		7.8%
1860	4,529		50.4%
1870	5,744		26.8%
1880	6,642		15.6%
1890	7,604		14.5%
1900	7,657		0.7%
1910	8,262		7.9%
1920	8,518		3.1%
1930	9,803		15.1%
1940	9,542		−2.7%
1950	10,047		5.3%
1960	23,385		132.8%
1970	30,095		28.7%
1980	31,740		5.5%
1990	33,187		4.6%
2000	35,838		8.0%
2010	38,394		7.1%
2020	40,812		6.3%
U.S. Decennial Census

=== Racial and ethnic composition ===
Annapolis city, Maryland – Racial and ethnic composition Note: the US Census treats Hispanic/Latino as an ethnic category. This table excludes Latinos from the racial categories and assigns them to a separate category. Hispanics/Latinos may be of any race.
Race / Ethnicity (NH = Non-Hispanic)	Pop 2000	Pop 2010	Pop 2020	% 2000	% 2010	% 2020
White alone (NH)	21,137	20,532	20,153	58.98%	53.48%	49.38%
Black or African American alone (NH)	11,205	9,854	8,746	31.27%	25.67%	21.43%
Native American or Alaska Native alone (NH)	50	51	46	0.14%	0.13%	0.11%
Asian alone (NH)	640	789	1,001	1.79%	2.06%	2.45%
Native Hawaiian or Pacific Islander alone (NH)	7	9	18	0.02%	0.02%	0.04%
Other race alone (NH)	51	79	154	0.14%	0.21%	0.38%
Mixed race or Multiracial (NH)	447	632	1,367	1.25%	1.65%	3.35%
Hispanic or Latino (any race)	2,301	6,448	9,327	6.42%	16.79%	22.85%
Total	35,838	38,394	40,812	100.00%	100.00%	100.00%

=== 2020 census ===
As of the 2020 census, Annapolis had a population of 40,812. The median age was 37.0 years. 21.6% of residents were under the age of 18 and 16.3% of residents were 65 years of age or older. For every 100 females there were 90.5 males, and for every 100 females age 18 and over there were 86.6 males age 18 and over.

100.0% of residents lived in urban areas, while 0.0% lived in rural areas.

There were 16,751 households in Annapolis, of which 27.3% had children under the age of 18 living in them. Of all households, 36.8% were married-couple households, 19.5% were households with a male householder and no spouse or partner present, and 36.0% were households with a female householder and no spouse or partner present. About 33.8% of all households were made up of individuals and 12.7% had someone living alone who was 65 years of age or older.

There were 18,455 housing units, of which 9.2% were vacant. The homeowner vacancy rate was 1.9% and the rental vacancy rate was 7.1%.

Racial composition as of the 2020 census
Race	Number	Percent
White	21,387	52.4%
Black or African American	8,859	21.7%
American Indian and Alaska Native	303	0.7%
Asian	1,006	2.5%
Native Hawaiian and Other Pacific Islander	18	0.0%
Some other race	5,931	14.5%
Two or more races	3,308	8.1%

=== 2010 census ===
As of the 2010 census, there were 38,394 people, 16,136 households, and 8,776 families residing in the city. The population density was 5,347.4 inhabitants per square mile (2,064.6/km^{2}). There were 17,845 housing units at an average density of 2,485.4 units per square mile (959.6 units/km^{2}). The racial makeup of the city was 60.1% White, 26.0% African American, 0.3% Native American, 2.1% Asian, 9.0% from other races, and 2.6% from two or more races. Hispanic or Latino people of any race were 16.8% of the population.

There were 16,136 households, of which 26.6% had children under the age of 18 living with them, 35.3% were married couples living together, 14.9% had a female householder with no husband present, 4.2% had a male householder with no wife present, and 45.6% were non-families. Of all households, 35.0% were made up of individuals, and 11.1% had someone living alone who was 65 years of age or older. The average household size was 2.34 and the average family size was 3.02.

The median age in the city was 36 years. 20.8% of residents were under the age of 18; 9.9% were between the ages of 18 and 24; 31.1% were from 25 to 44; 25.3% were from 45 to 64; and 13% were 65 years of age or older. The gender makeup of the city was 47.8% male and 52.2% female.

=== 2000 census ===
As of the 2000 census, there were 35,838 people, 15,303 households, and 8,676 families residing in the city. The population density was 5,326.0 inhabitants per square mile (2,056.4/km^{2}). There were 16,165 housing units at an average density of 2,402.3 units per square mile (927.5 units/km^{2}). The racial makeup of the city was 62.66% White, 31.44% Black or African American, 0.17% Native American, 1.81% Asian, 0.03% Pacific Islander, 2.22% from other races, and 1.67% from two or more races. 8.42% of the population were Hispanic or Latino of any race.

There were 15,303 households, out of which 24.5% had children under the age of 18 living with them, 36.6% were married couples living together, 16.3% had a female householder with no husband present, and 43.3% were non-families. Of all households, 32.9% were made up of individuals, and 9.2% had someone living alone who was 65 years of age or older. The average household size was 2.30 and the average family size was 2.93.

In the city, 21.7% of the population was under the age of 18, 9.3% from 18 to 24, 33.4% from 25 to 44, 23.7% from 45 to 64, and 11.9% was 65 years of age or older. The median age was 36 years. For every 100 females, there were 90.0 males. For every 100 females age 18 and over there were 86.8 males age 18 and over.

The median income for a household in the city was $49,243, and the median income for a family was $56,984 (these figures had risen to $70,140 and $84,573 respectively, according to a 2007 estimate). Males had a median income of $39,548 versus $30,741 for females. The per capita income for the city was $27,180. About 9.5% of families and 12.7% of the population were living in poverty, of which 20.8% were under age 18 and 10.4% were age 65 or over.

== Economy ==
According to the city's 2018 Comprehensive Annual Financial Report, the top employers in the city, excluding state and local government, are:

#	Employer	Employees
1	United States Naval Academy	2,500
2	ARC of the Central Chesapeake Region	502
3	Annapolis Marriott Waterfront Hotel	215
4	St. John's College	204
5	Comtech Telecommunications Corp.	200
6	Federal Catering	180
7	Buddy's Crabs & Ribs, Inc.	167
8	Loews Annapolis Hotel	166
9	Severn Bancorp Inc.	163
10	Rams Head Tavern, Inc.	140

== Arts and culture ==
=== Theater ===
Annapolis has a thriving community theater scene which includes two venues in the historic district.

On East Street, Colonial Players produces approximately six shows a year in its 180-seat theater. A Christmas Carol has been a seasonal tradition in Annapolis since it opened at the Colonial Players theater in 1981. Based on the play by Charles Dickens, the 90-minute production by the Colonial Players is an original musical adaptation, with play and lyrics by Richard Wade and music by Dick Gessner. Colonial Players, Inc. is a nonprofit organization founded in 1949. Its first production, The Male Animal, was performed in 1949 at the Annapolis Recreation Center on Compromise Street. In 1955, the organization moved to its venue in a former automotive repair shop on East Street.

During the warmer months, Annapolis Summer Garden Theatre presents three shows on its outdoor stage, which is visible from the City Dock. A nonprofit organization, Annapolis Summer Garden Theatre has been providing "theatre under the stars" since 1966, when it performed You Can't Take It with You and Brigadoon at Carvel Hall Hotel. It began leasing its site at 143 Compromise Street, the former location of the Shaw Blacksmith Shop, in 1967, and became owner of the property in 1990.

The Naval Academy Masqueraders, a theater group at the United States Naval Academy, produces one "main-stage show" each fall and student-directed one-act plays in the spring. Founded in 1847, the Masqueraders is the oldest extracurricular activity at the Naval Academy. Its shows, performed in Mahan Hall, are selected to support the academy's English curriculum.

The King William Players, a student theater group at St. John's College, holds two performances each semester in the college's Francis Scott Key Auditorium. Admission is usually free and open to the public.

=== Museums, historical sites, and monuments ===
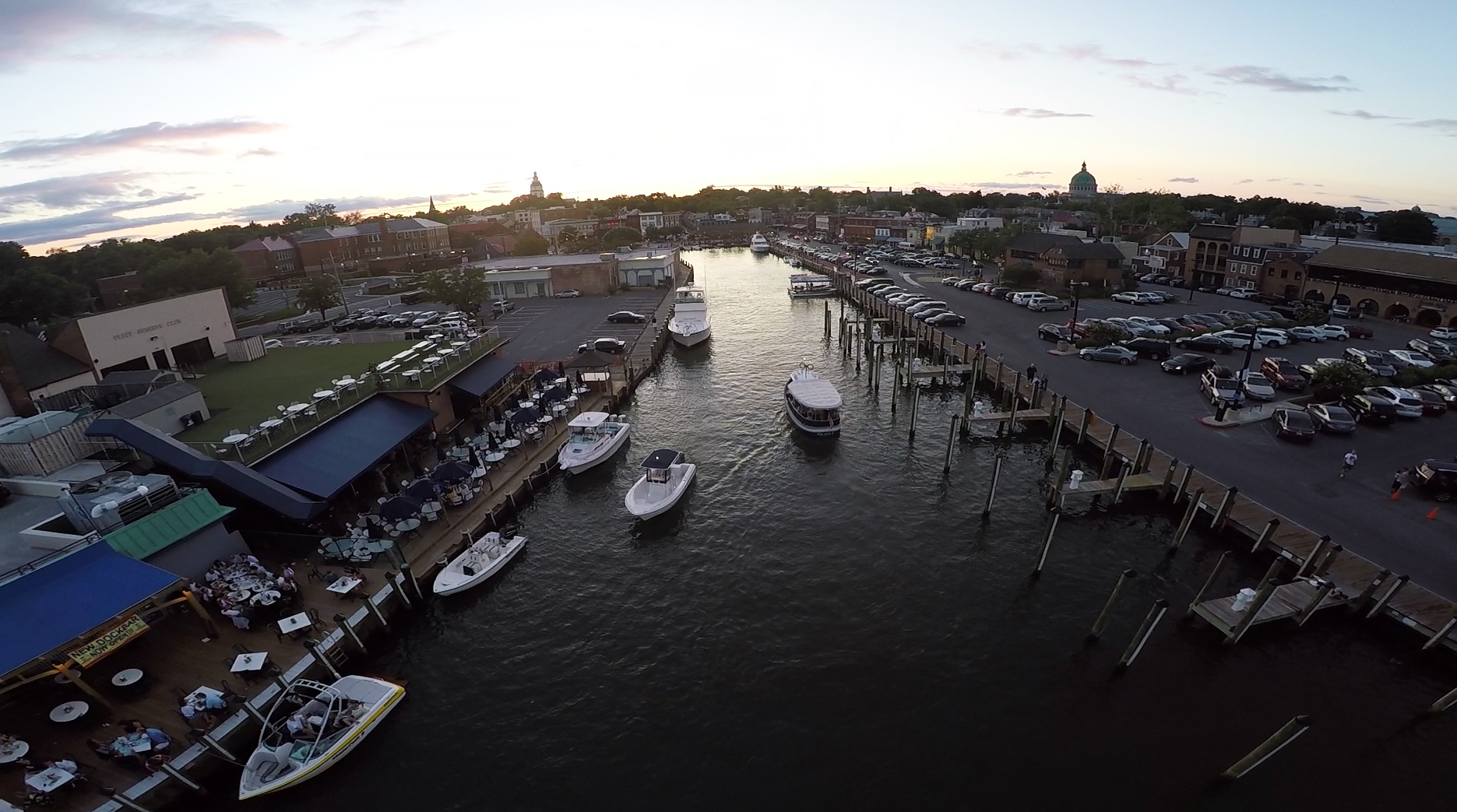
Over Annapolis Harbor & Dock Street

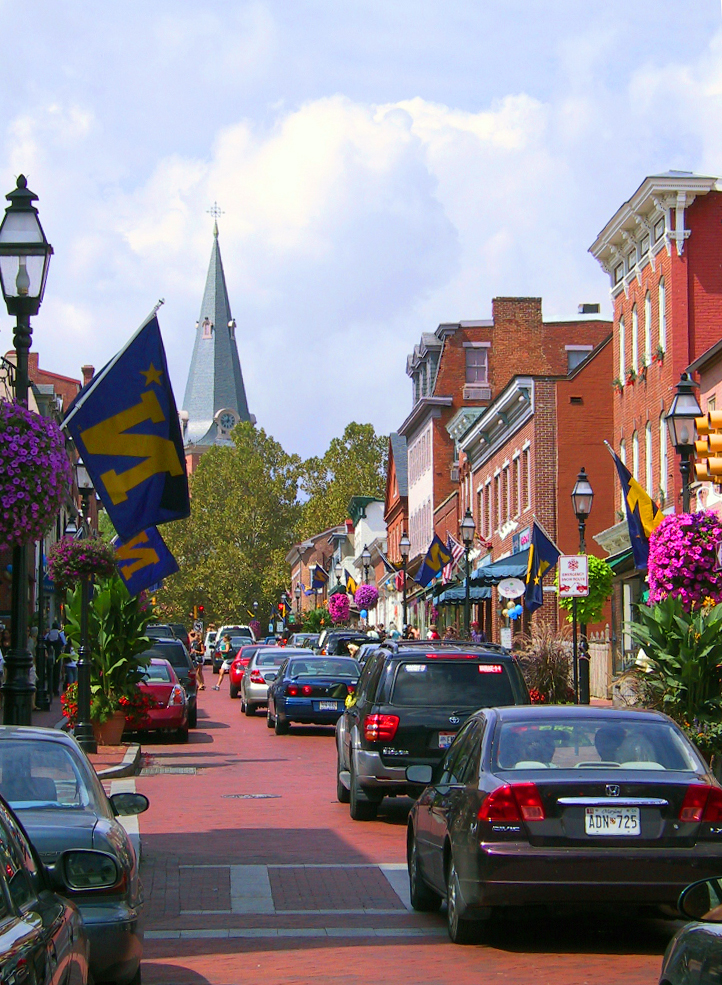
Downtown Annapolis's Main Street in September 2004

The Banneker-Douglass Museum, located in the historic Mount Moriah Church at 87 Franklin Street, documents the history of African Americans in Maryland. Since its opening on February 24, 1984, the museum has provided educational programs, rotating exhibits, and a research facility. Admission is free.

Preble Hall, named for Edward Preble, houses the United States Naval Academy Museum, founded in 1845. Its Beverley R. Robinson Collection contains 6,000 prints depicting European and American naval history from 1514 through World War II. It is also home to one of the world's best ship model collections, donated by Henry Huttleston Rogers. Rogers's donation was the impetus for the construction of Preble Hall. The museum has approximately 100,000 visitors each year.

The Hammond-Harwood House, located at 19 Maryland Avenue, was built in 1774 for Matthias Hammond, a wealthy Maryland farmer. Its design was adapted by William Buckland from Andrea Palladio's Villa Pisani to accommodate American Colonial regional preferences. Since 1940, when the house was purchased from St. John's College by the Hammond-Harwood House Association, it has served as a museum exhibiting a collection of John Shaw furniture and Charles Willson Peale paintings. Its exterior and interior preserve the original architecture of a mansion from the late Colonial period.

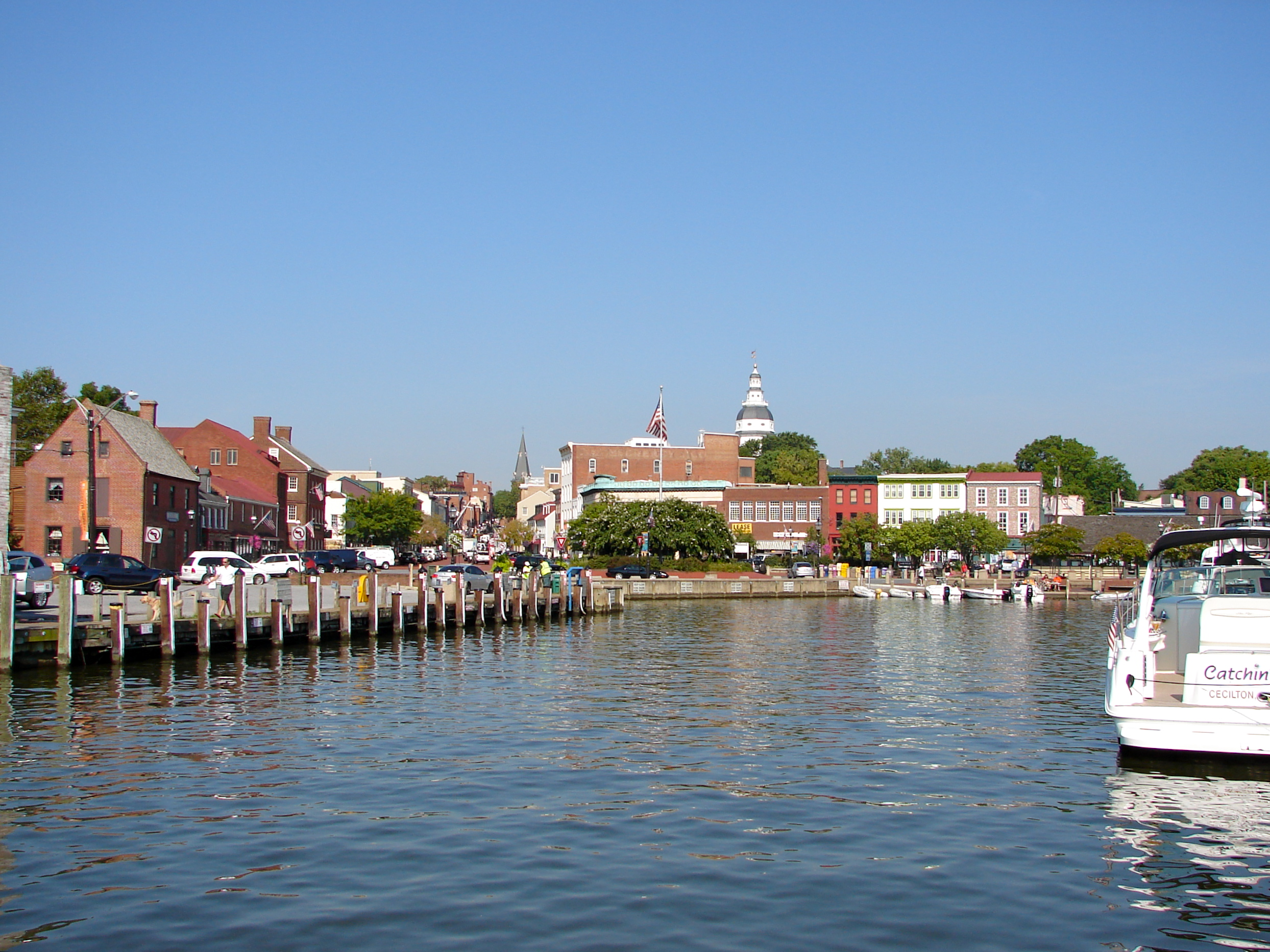
View into City Dock with Market House at right and Main Street to left

Annapolis City Dock lies at the foot of Main Street that slopes down from Church Circle and St. Anne's Church. The dock is now a narrow waterway from Spa Creek, once named Carrol's Creek with the dock area called Dock Cove, into the heart of the lower town. At the head of the dock is a small park with the Kunta Kinte-Alex Haley Memorial with the Market House and a traffic circle in an expanse of asphalt surrounded by historic buildings. The Market House, though relatively modern, stands in a vicinity occupied by similar market houses dating to 1730 when the city market was moved from the State House area to the head of the dock. The dock itself is now used largely by recreational vessels rather than the commercial boats and boats of Chesapeake Bay watermen selling catches. The dock and surroundings are part of the Colonial Annapolis National Historic Landmark (NHL) District.

The Kunta Kinte-Alex Haley memorial, located in a park at the head of Annapolis City Dock, commemorates the arrival point of Alex Haley's African ancestor, Kunta Kinte, whose story is related in Haley's 1976 novel Roots: The Saga of an American Family. A sculpture group at the memorial site portrays Alex Haley seated, reading from a book to three children. The final phase of the memorial's construction was completed in 2002.

The Paca House and Garden encompasses an 18th-century Georgian mansion constructed by William Paca, a signer of the Declaration of Independence. The property includes a terraced garden that has been restored to its colonial-era design.

Annapolis often serves as the end point for the 3,000-mile annual transcontinental Race Across America bicycle race.

To the north of the state house is a monument to Thurgood Marshall, the first black justice of the US Supreme Court and formerly a Maryland lawyer who won many important civil rights cases.

Located just before the Naval Academy Bridge is the World War II Memorial, which was constructed in 1998 to symbolize the sacrifice made by the 275,000 citizens from Maryland who joined the service to fight in the war. The memorial is composed of 48 granite columns to represent the 48 states at the time of the war surrounding an amphitheater in which are the names of 6,454 men who gave their lives in the war. Directly behind the memorial are both the Maryland, and United States flags, and a star shaped column with a seven sided base to represent Maryland being the seventh state in the Union.

== Sports ==
=== Sailing ===
Annapolis is considered by some to be the "Sailing Capital of the World" or "America's Sailing Capital". It hosts several prestigious regattas each season, including the Helly-Hansen Sailing World Regatta, the J/30 North American Championships, and the J/70 North American Championships. Multiple well-known sailing schools are located in the city, including the Annapolis Sailing School, which opened in 1959 as the first recreational sailing school for adults. Each year, Annapolis hosts the Annapolis Sailboat Show, which is the largest in-water sailboat show in the world.

=== Lacrosse ===
On March 9, 2010, the Chesapeake Bayhawks of Major League Lacrosse moved from Washington, D.C., to the Annapolis area, at Navy–Marine Corps Memorial Stadium. In 2013, the Bayhawks won the league's championship, the Steinfeld Cup, for the fifth time.

=== Soccer ===
Annapolis Blues FC is a men's amateur soccer team that plays in USL League Two, which also competes out of Navy–Marine Corps Memorial Stadium.

== Parks and recreation ==
The city maintains over 200 acres (81 ha) of parkland, with the largest being the 70-acre (28 ha) Truxtun Heights Park. Quiet Waters Park, a 340-acre (140 ha) regional park run by Anne Arundel County, offers water access, a playground area, over 6 miles (9.7 km) of paved trails, and ice skating rink, and a dog beach.

Community parks:

- Bayhead Park
- Bestgate Park
- Broad Creek Park
- Broadneck Park
- Browns Wood Park
- Generals Highway Corridor Park
- Jones and Anne Catharine Park
- Peninsula Park
- Truxton Park
- Whitmore Park
- Wiley H. Bates Heritage Park

=== Events and festivals ===
Annapolis is home to many seasonal or holiday-themed events and festivals that take place throughout the year. Some examples are the annual St. Patrick's Day Parade, May Day, and United States Naval Academy Commissioning Week.

== Government ==
=== City government ===
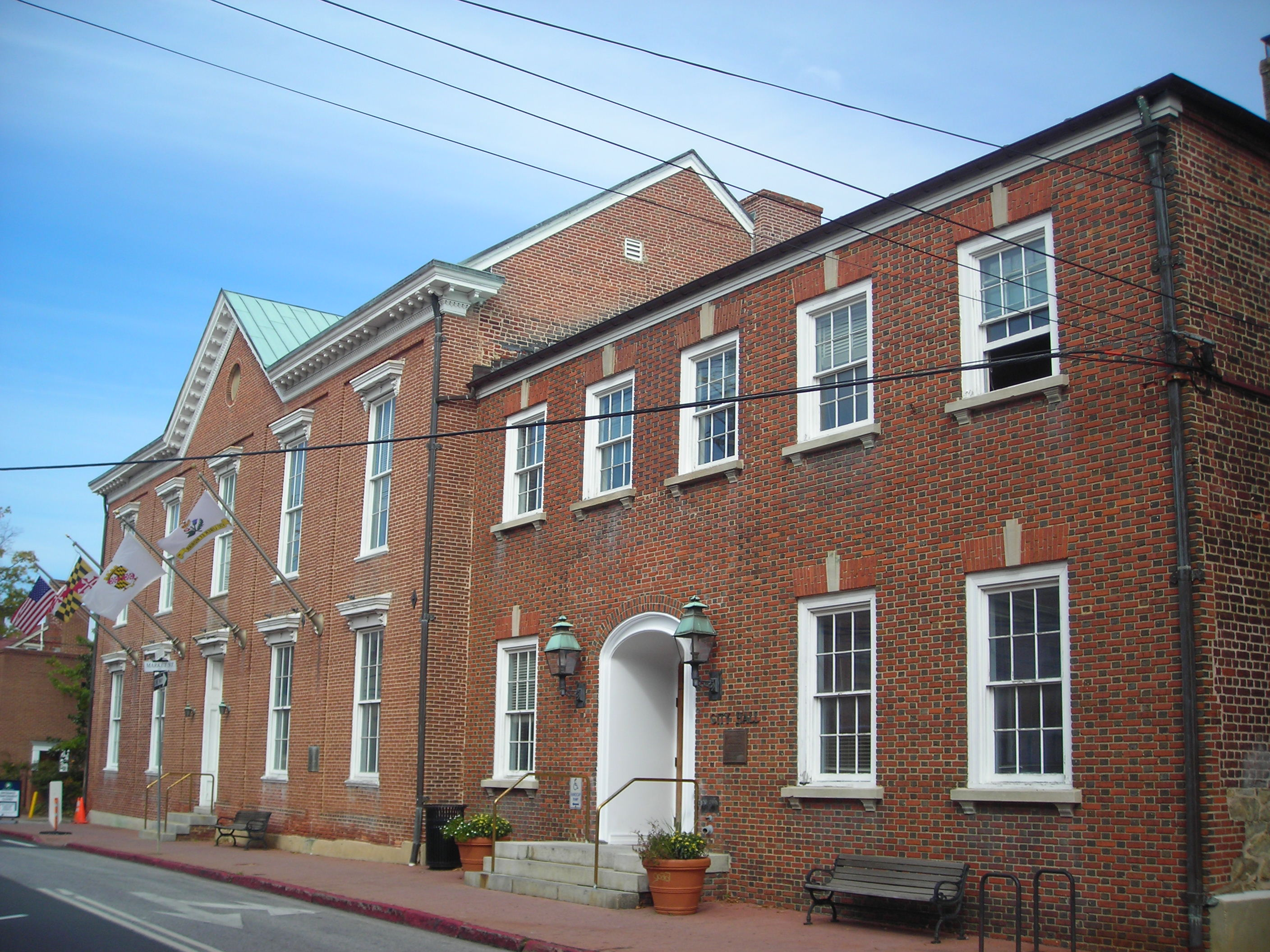
Annapolis City Hall

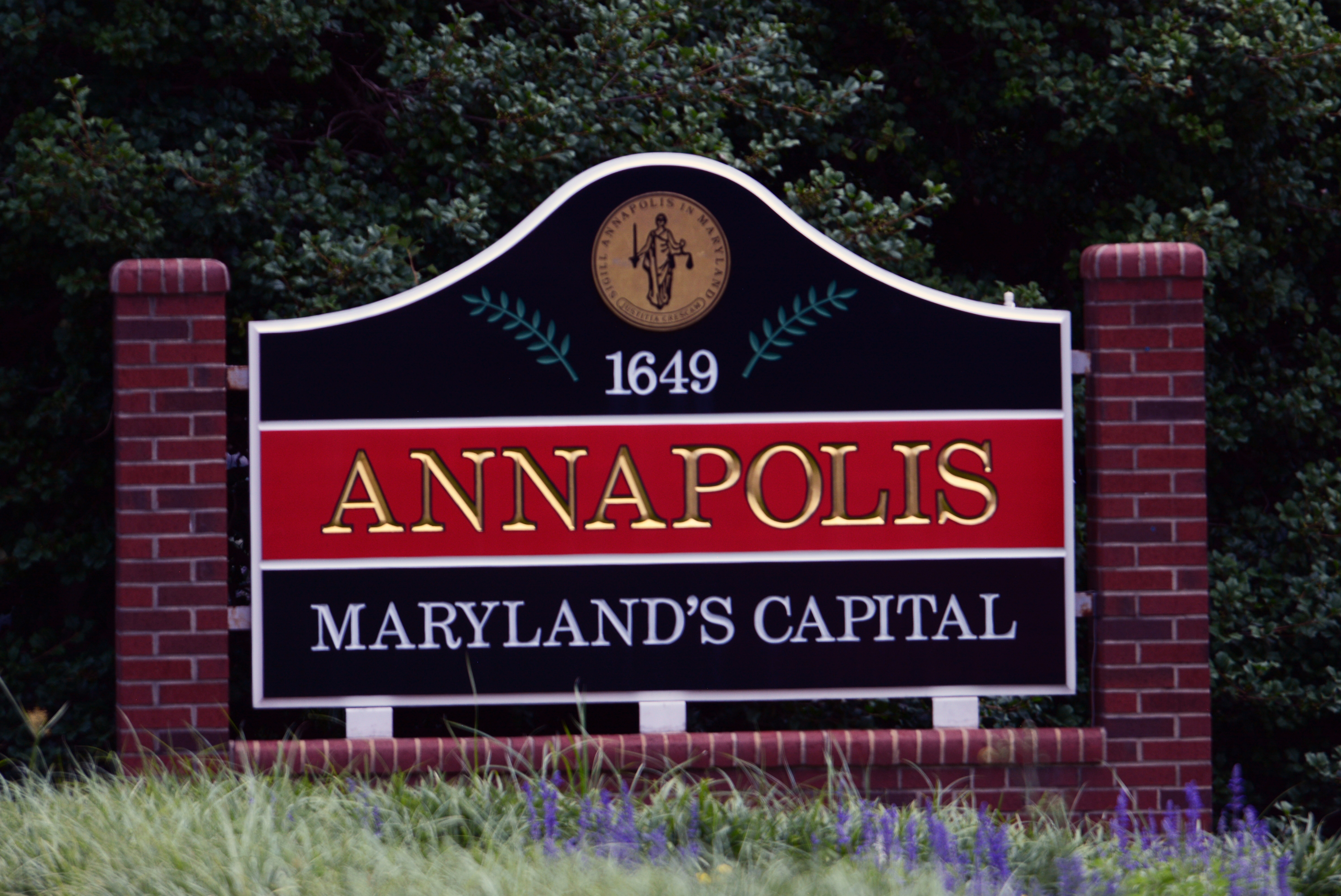
Annapolis, Maryland, sign

Annapolis is governed via the weak mayor system. The city council consists of eight aldermen who are elected from single-member wards. The mayor is elected directly in a citywide vote. Since 2008, several aldermen have introduced unsuccessful charter amendments to institute a council–manager system, a move opposed by both Democratic mayor Joshua J. Cohen and his Republican successor Mike Pantelides.

=== State government ===
The state legislature, governor's office, and appellate courts are located in Annapolis. While Annapolis is the state's only capital, some administrative offices, including a number of cabinet-level departments, are based in Baltimore.

== Education ==
Annapolis is served by the Anne Arundel County Public Schools system. Founded in 1896, Annapolis High School has an internationally recognized IB International Program.

Public schools that serve students in the Annapolis area:

- Annapolis High
- Annapolis Middle
- Bates Middle
- Annapolis Elementary
- Eastport Elementary
- Georgetown East Elementary
- Germantown Elementary
- Hillsmere Elementary
- Mills-Parole Elementary
- Rolling Knolls Elementary
- Severn Run High
- Tyler Heights Elementary
- West Annapolis Elementary

St. Anne's School of Annapolis, Aleph Bet Jewish Day School, Annapolis Area Christian School, St. Martins Lutheran School, Severn School, St. Mary's High School (Annapolis, Maryland), and Indian Creek School are private schools in the Annapolis area. The Key School, located on a converted farm in the neighborhood of Hillsmere, has also served Annapolis for over 50 years. Anne Arundel County's alternative school, Mary E. Moss Academy, which has around 160 students ranging grades 6–9, is also in the Annapolis area.

== Media ==
The Capital covers the news of Annapolis and Anne Arundel County. In addition to being in the broadcast areas of Baltimore and Washington, D.C., television and most radio stations, Annapolis is home of radio station WNAV.

== Infrastructure ==
=== Transportation ===
==== Roads and highways ====
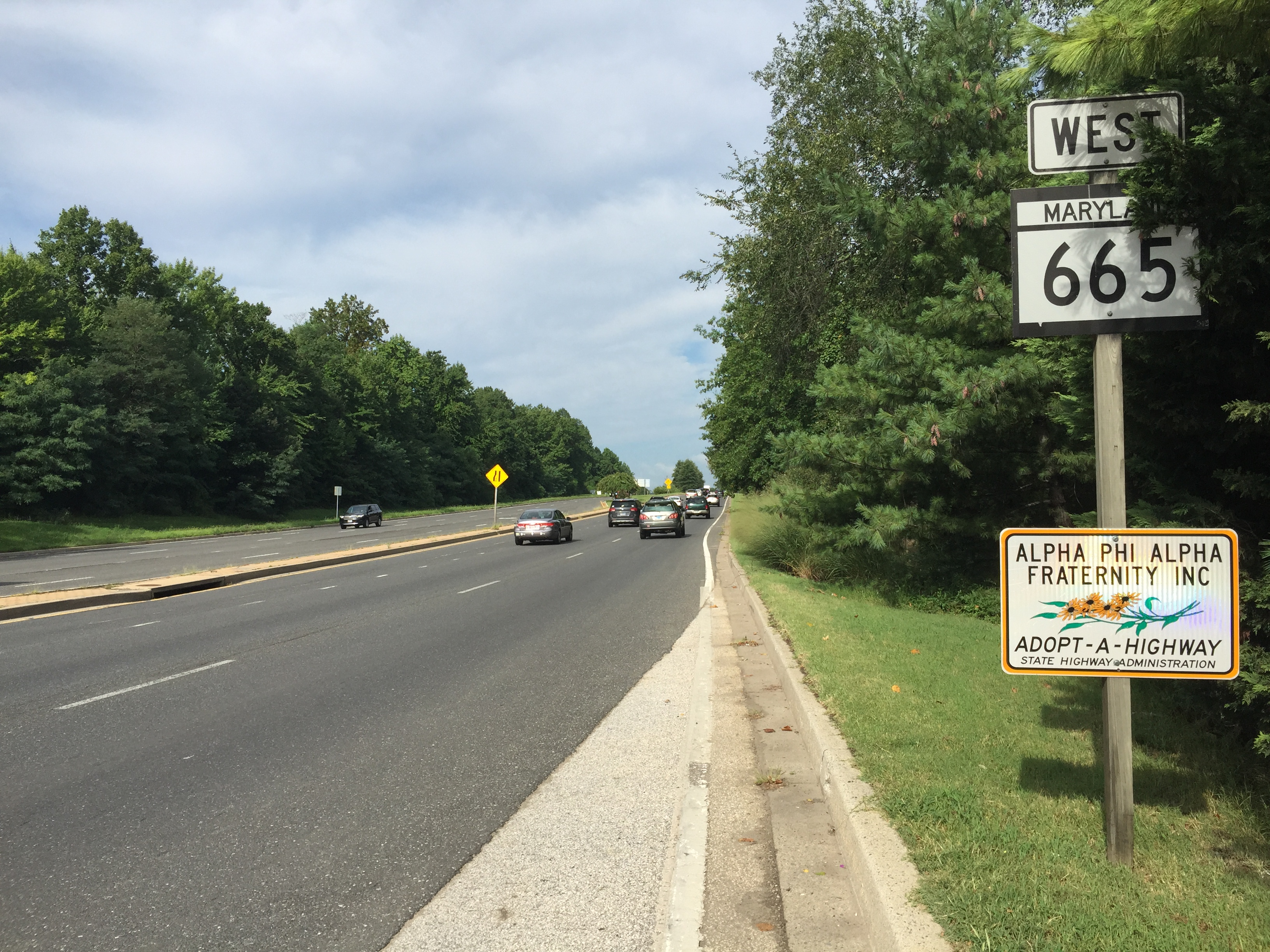
MD 665 in Annapolis

Roads in Annapolis include:

- MD 70
- MD 665
- MD 181
- MD 387
- MD 393
- MD 435
- MD 436
- MD 450
- MD 788
- MD 797

==== Bus ====
The Annapolis Department of Transportation provides bus service with eight routes, collectively branded Annapolis Transit. The system serves the city with recreational areas, shopping centers, educational and medical facilities, and employment hubs. ADOT also offers transportation for the elderly and persons with disabilities. Several Maryland Transit Administration commuter buses also allow for access to Baltimore or Washington, D.C.

==== Railway ====
From 1840 to 1968, Annapolis was connected to the outside world by railroad. The Washington, Baltimore and Annapolis Electric Railway operated two electrified interurban lines that brought passengers into the city from both the South and the North. The southern route ran down King George Street and Main Street, leading directly to the statehouse, while the northern route entered town via Glen Burnie. In 1935, the Washington, Baltimore and Annapolis Electric Railway went bankrupt due to the effects of the Great Depression and suspended service along its southern route, while the newly created Baltimore & Annapolis Railroad retained service on the northern route. Steam trains of the Baltimore and Ohio Railroad also occasionally operated over the line to Annapolis, primarily for special Naval Academy movements. Passenger rail service on the Baltimore & Annapolis Railroad was eventually discontinued in 1950; freight service ceased in 1968 after the dilapidated trestle crossing the Severn River was condemned. The tracks were eventually dismantled in 1976.

== See also ==
- Music of Annapolis
- WNAV
- WRHS

== Explanatory notes ==
Preceded by Saint Mary's City	Capital of Maryland; 1695–present	Succeeded by Current

Preceded by Princeton, New Jersey	Capital of the United States of America; 1783–1784	Succeeded by Trenton, New Jersey
