= Grasonville, Maryland =

- CDP
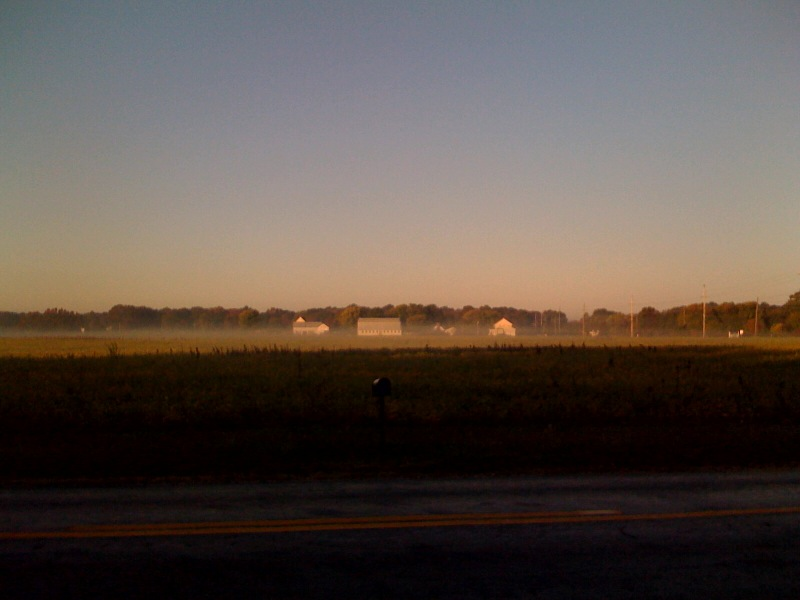
- Morning in Grasonville

- Coordinates: 38°57′46″N 76°12′12″W
- Country: United States
- State: Maryland
- County: Queen Anne's

Area
  - Total: 6.29 sq mi (16.29 km^{2})
  - Land: 5.53 sq mi (14.32 km^{2})
  - Water: 0.76 sq mi (1.97 km^{2})
- Elevation: 16 ft (5 m)

Population (2020)
  - Total: 3,474
  - Density: 628/sq mi (242.6/km^{2})
- Time zone: UTC−5 (Eastern (EST))
  - Summer (DST): UTC−4 (EDT)
- ZIP code: 21638
- Area code: 410
- FIPS code: 24-34550
- GNIS feature ID: 0597482

Grasonville is a census-designated place (CDP) in Queen Anne's County, Maryland, United States. The population was 2,193 at the 2000 census.

== Geography ==
Grasonville is located at 38°57′46″N 76°12′12″W (38.962875, −76.203305).

According to the United States Census Bureau, the CDP has a total area of 5.2 square miles (13 km^{2}), of which 4.7 square miles (12 km^{2}) is land and 0.6 square miles (1.6 km^{2}) (10.56%) is water.

== Demographics ==
Historical population
Census	Pop.	Note	%±
2000	2,193		—
2010	3,425		56.2%
2020	3,474		1.4%
U.S. Decennial Census

=== 2020 census ===
As of the 2020 census, Grasonville had a population of 3,474. The median age was 38.4 years. 26.3% of residents were under the age of 18 and 13.5% of residents were 65 years of age or older. For every 100 females there were 100.7 males, and for every 100 females age 18 and over there were 98.0 males age 18 and over.

67.5% of residents lived in urban areas, while 32.5% lived in rural areas.

There were 1,267 households in Grasonville, of which 34.2% had children under the age of 18 living in them. Of all households, 50.5% were married-couple households, 17.4% were households with a male householder and no spouse or partner present, and 21.1% were households with a female householder and no spouse or partner present. About 21.4% of all households were made up of individuals and 10.2% had someone living alone who was 65 years of age or older.

There were 1,408 housing units, of which 10.0% were vacant. The homeowner vacancy rate was 2.3% and the rental vacancy rate was 7.1%.

Racial composition as of the 2020 census
Race	Number	Percent
White	2,534	72.9%
Black or African American	443	12.8%
American Indian and Alaska Native	17	0.5%
Asian	54	1.6%
Native Hawaiian and Other Pacific Islander	3	0.1%
Some other race	196	5.6%
Two or more races	227	6.5%
Hispanic or Latino (of any race)	293	8.4%

=== 2010 census ===
As of the 2010 census, there were 3,425 people, 1,248 households, and 871 families residing in the CDP. The population density was 619.9 people per square mile. The racial makeup of the CDP was 72.06% White, 20.06% African American, 0.64% Native American, 1.49% Asian, 2.92% from other races, and 2.83% from two or more races. Hispanic or Latino of any race were 5.52% of the population.

There were 1,248 total occupied households. 659 (52.8%) of Grasonville households were married couples living together, 144 (11.5%) had a female householder with no husband present, and 377 (30.2%) were non-families. 286 households were made up of individuals, and 116 had someone living alone who was 65 years of age or older. The average household size was 2.73 and the average family size was 3.21.

In the CDP, the population was spread out, with 28.5% under the age of 18, 8.3% from 18 to 24, 27.8% from 25 to 44, 26.2% from 45 to 64, and 12.6% who were 65 years of age or older. The median age was 37.7 years. For every 100 females, there were 99.1 males.

=== Income and poverty ===
According to the American Community Survey, the median income for a household in the CDP was $82,467, and the median income for a family was $105,078. The per capita income for the CDP was $33,560. About 8.5% of families and 13.5% of the population were below the poverty line, including 21.5% of those under age 18 and 9.5% of those age 65 or over.

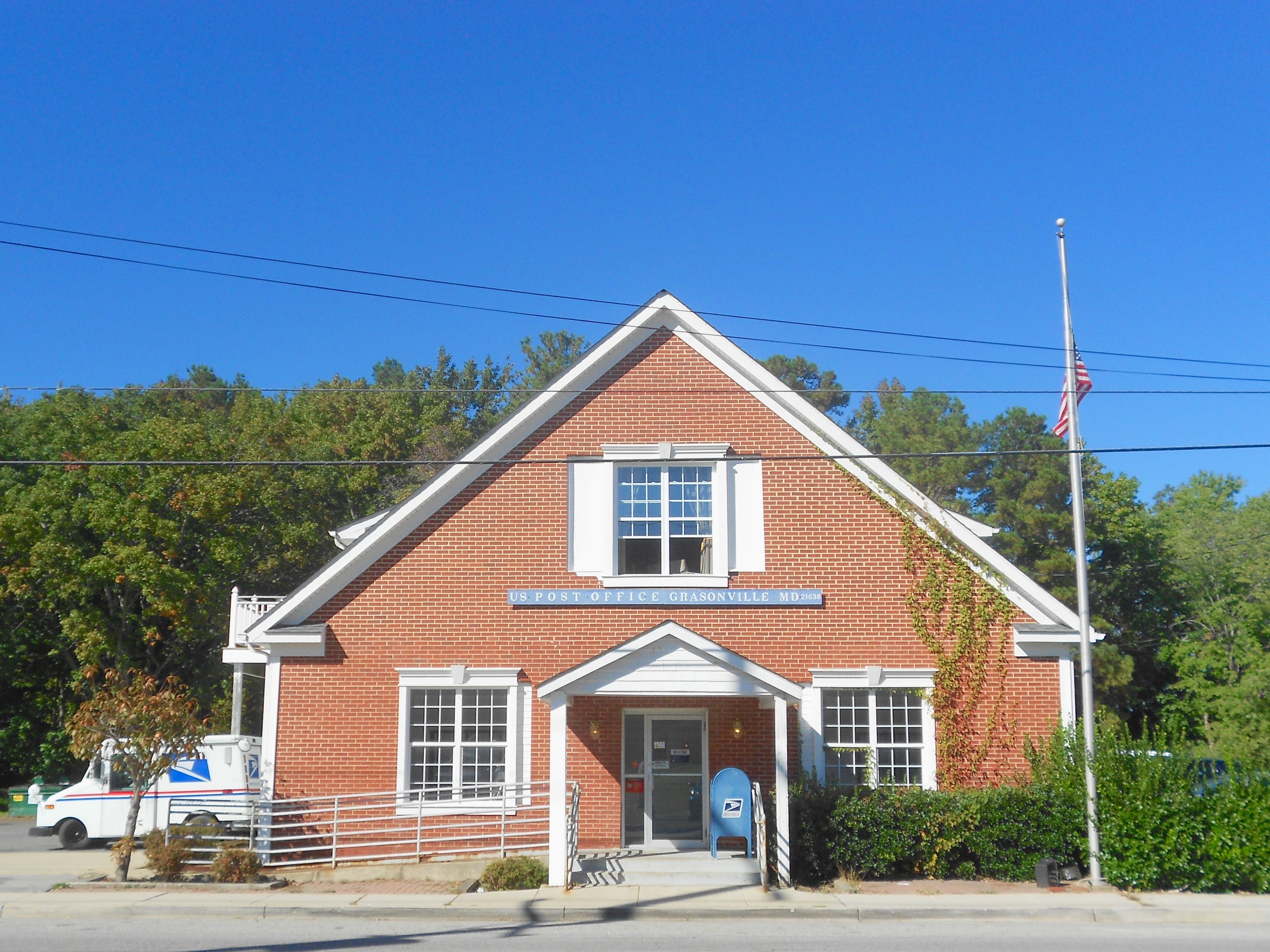
Post office
