= List of radio stations in Maryland =

The following is a list of FCC-licensed radio stations in the U.S. state of Maryland which can be sorted by their call signs, frequencies, cities of license, licensees, and programming formats.

== List of radio stations ==
Call sign	Frequency	City of license	Licensee	Format
WAAI	100.9 FM	Hurlock	WBOC, Inc.	Classic country
WACA	900 AM	Laurel	ACR Media, Inc.	Spanish news/talk
WAFY	103.1 FM	Middletown	Manning Broadcasting, Inc.	Hot adult contemporary
WAIJ	90.3 FM	Grantsville	American Family Association	Religious talk (AFR)
WAMD	970 AM	Aberdeen	Radio Broadcast Communications, Inc.	Adult hits
WARK	1490 AM	Hagerstown	Manning Broadcasting, Inc.	News/Talk/Sports
WAVD	97.1 FM	Ocean Pines	FM Radio Licenses, LLC	Classic hits
WAYZ	104.7 FM	Hagerstown	HJV Limited Partnership	Country
WBAL	1090 AM	Baltimore	Hearst Stations Inc.	News/Talk/Sports
WBBX	106.1 FM	Pocomoke City	Michael Powell	Classic hits
WBEY-FM	97.9 FM	Crisfield	GSB Media, LLC	Country
WBJC	91.5 FM	Baltimore	Baltimore City Community College	Classical
WBMD	750 AM	Baltimore	Family Stations, Inc.	Religious
WBOC-FM	102.5 FM	Princess Anne	WBOC, Inc.	Top 40 (CHR)
WBQH	1050 AM	Silver Spring	Washington DC FCC License Sub, LLC	Regional Mexican
WBYC-LP	107.3 FM	Crisfield	The Somerset County Arts Council	Variety
WCAO	600 AM	Baltimore	iHM Licenses, LLC	Urban gospel
WCBC	1270 AM	Cumberland	Cumberland Broadcasting Company	News/Talk/Sports
WCBM	680 AM	Baltimore	WCBM Maryland, Inc.	Talk
WCEI-FM	96.7 FM	Easton	FM Radio Licenses, LLC	Adult contemporary
WCEM	1240 AM	Cambridge	WBOC, Inc.	Sports (ISN)
WCEM-FM	106.3 FM	Cambridge	WBOC, Inc.	Country
WCMD	1230 AM	Cumberland	West Virginia Radio Corporation of the Alleghenies	News/Talk/Sports
WCRH	90.5 FM	Williamsport	Cedar Ridge Children's Home & School, Inc	Religious
WCTG	96.5 FM	West Pocomoke	Sebago Broadcasting Company	Adult hits
WCTN	950 AM	Potomac-Cabin John	Win Radio Broadcasting Corporation	Spanish
WCTR	1530 AM	Chestertown	Hometown Multimedia, LLC	Classic hits
WDCH-FM	99.1 FM	Bowie	Audacy License, LLC	Business news
WDIH	90.3 FM	Salisbury	Salisbury Educational B/C Foundation	Urban gospel
WDLD	96.7 FM	Halfway	Alpha Media Licensee LLC	Top 40 (CHR)
WDMV	700 AM	Walkersville	Birach Broadcasting Corporation	Spanish
WDON	1540 AM	Wheaton	Renovación Media Group	Spanish Catholic
WDZN	99.5 FM	Midland	West Virginia Radio Corporation of the Alleghenies	Active rock
WEAA	88.9 FM	Baltimore	Morgan State University	Jazz
WEES-LP	107.9 FM	Ocean City	Edinboro Early School, Inc.	Variety
WERQ-FM	92.3 FM	Baltimore	Radio One Licenses, LLC	Mainstream urban
WESM	91.3 FM	Princess Anne	University of Maryland, Eastern Shore	Jazz/Public radio
WFBR	1590 AM	Glen Burnie	Way Broadcasting Licensee, LLC	Talk
WFHW	90.3 FM	Cambridge	Harriet Tubman Organization, Inc.	Public news/talk
WFMD	930 AM	Frederick	Connoisseur Media Licenses, LLC	News/Talk/Sports
WFOA	1230 AM	Baltimore	BMax Media LLC	Spanish CHR
WFRB	560 AM	Frostburg	FM Radio Licenses, LLC	Country
WFRB-FM	105.3 FM	Frostburg	FM Radio Licenses, LLC	Country
WFRE	99.9 FM	Frederick	Connoisseur Media Licenses, LLC	Country
WFSI	860 AM	Baltimore	Family Stations, Inc.	Religious (Family Radio)
WFWM	91.9 FM	Frostburg	Frostburg State University	Public radio
WGMS	89.1 FM	Hagerstown	Greater Washington Educational Telecommunications Assn.	Classical
WGBG-FM	107.7 FM	Fruitland	WBOC, Inc.	Classic rock
WGBZ	88.3 FM	Ocean City	Atlantic Gateway Communications, Inc.	Christian adult contemporary
WGTS	91.9 FM	Takoma Park	Atlantic Gateway Communications, Inc.	Christian adult contemporary
WGWS	88.1 FM	St. Mary's City	CSN International	Religious (CSN International)
WHAG	1410 AM	Halfway	Alpha Media Licensee LLC	Oldies
WHCP-FM	91.7 FM	Trappe	Mid-Shore Community Radio, Inc.	Community radio
WHFC	91.1 FM	Bel Air	Harford Community College	Variety
WHGM	1330 AM	Havre De Grace	Maryland Media One LLC	Adult hits
WHGT	1590 AM	Maugansville	WHGT Christian Radio, LLC	Religious
WIAD	94.7 FM	Bethesda	Audacy License, LLC	Hot adult contemporaryry
WICL	95.9 FM	Williamsport	West Virginia Radio Corporation of the Alleghenies	Classic country
WICO-FM	101.1 FM	Snow Hill	GSB Media, LLC	Classic country
WINX-FM	94.3 FM	St. Michaels	FM Radio Licenses, LLC	Country
WIYY	97.9 FM	Baltimore	Hearst Stations Inc.	Mainstream rock
WJDY	1470 AM	Salisbury	iHM Licenses, LLC	News/Talk
WJEJ	1240 AM	Hagerstown	Hagerstown Broadcasting Company	Full service/Adult standards
WJFK	1580 AM	Morningside	Audacy License, LLC	Sports gambling
WJKI	1320 AM	Salisbury	The Voice Radio, LLC	Classic rock
WJZ	1300 AM	Baltimore	Audacy License, LLC	Sports gambling
WJZ-FM	105.7 FM	Catonsville	Audacy License, LLC	Sports (ISN)
WKDI	840 AM	Denton	Positive Alternative Radio, Inc.	Religious
WKHI	94.9 FM	Newark	The Voice Radio Network, LLC	Classic hits
WKHJ	104.5 FM	Mountain Lake Park	Broadcast Communications, Inc.	Adult contemporary
WKHS	90.5 FM	Worton	Board of Education of Kent County	Adult album alternative
WKIK	102.9 FM	California	Somar Communications, Inc.	Country
WKTQ	92.3 FM	Oakland	Broadcast Communications, Inc.	Country
WKTT	97.5 FM	Salisbury	Rojo Broadcasting, LLC	Mainstream urban
WKTZ-FM	95.9 FM	Loch Lynn Heights	Broadcast Communications, Inc.	Classic hits
WKZP	95.9 FM	West Ocean City	iHM Licenses, LLC	Top 40 (CHR)
WLDW	105.5 FM	Salisbury	Educational Media Foundation	Christian adult contemporary (K-Love)
WLIC	97.1 FM	Frostburg	Calvary Christian Fellowship of Cumberland, Inc.	Religious/Contemporary Christian
WLIF	101.9 FM	Baltimore	Audacy License, LLC	Adult contemporary
WLVV	88.3 FM	Midland	Educational Media Foundation	Christian adult contemporary (K-Love)
WLVX	100.7 FM	Westminster	Educational Media Foundation	Contemporary Christian (K-Love)
WLXE	1600 AM	Rockville	Multicultural Radio Broadcasting Licensee, LLC	Ethnic/Spanish
WLZL	107.9 FM	College Park	Audacy License, LLC	Spanish/English Rhythmic Contemporary
WMDM	97.7 FM	Lexington Park	Somar Communications, Inc.	Classic hits
WMET	1160 AM	Gaithersburg	La Promesa Foundation	Catholic religious
WMJS-LP	102.1 FM	Prince Frederick	St. Paul's Parish/St. Paul's Episcopal Church	Variety
WMMJ	102.3 FM	Bethesda	Radio One Licenses, LLC	Urban adult contemporary
WMSG	1050 AM	Oakland	Broadcast Communications, Inc.	Classic hits
WMTB-FM	89.9 FM	Emmitsburg	Mount Saint Mary's College, Incorporated	College/Catholic religious
WMUC-FM	90.5 FM	College Park	University of Maryland	Freeform
WMVK-LP	107.3 FM	Perryville	State of Maryland, MDOT, Maryland Transit Admn.	Traffic Information
WNAV	1430 AM	Annapolis	BMSC Media	Full service/Oldies
WNKZ-FM	92.5 FM	Pocomoke City	The Bridge of Hope, Inc.	Christian adult contemporary
WNST	1570 AM	Towson	Nasty 1570 Sports, LLC	Sports
WOEL-FM	89.9 FM	Elkton	Maranatha Bible Institute, Inc.	Religious talk (AFR)
WOLB	1010 AM	Baltimore	Radio One Licenses, LLC	Urban talk/urban contemporary
WOWD-LP	94.3 FM	Takoma Park	Historic Takoma Inc.	Variety
WPGC-FM	95.5 FM	Morningside	Audacy License, LLC	Mainstream urban
WPOC	93.1 FM	Baltimore	iHM Licenses, LLC	Country
WLNO	104.1 FM	Waldorf	Radio One Licenses, LLC	Latin pop
WPRS	92.7 FM	Prince Frederick	Radio One Licenses, LLC	Urban adult contemporary
WPSB-LP	99.5 FM	Ocean City	Town of Ocean City	Emergency Information
WPTX	1690 AM	Lexington Park	Somar Communications, Inc.	Oldies
WQER-LP	96.7 FM	Rockville	Chinese American Community Connection, Inc.	Ethnic/Chinese
WQHQ	104.7 FM	Ocean City-Salisbury	iHM Licenses, LLC	Adult contemporary
WQLL	1370 AM	Pikesville	M-10 Broadcasting, Inc.	Sports (FSR)
WQSR	102.7 FM	Baltimore	iHM Licenses, LLC	Adult hits
WRBS-FM	95.1 FM	Baltimore	Peter & John Radio Fellowship, Inc.	Christian adult contemporary
WRBY-LP	100.5 FM	Salisbury	Rebirth Inc.	Ethnic/Haitian
WRDE-FM	103.9 FM	Berlin	WBOC, Inc.	Country
WRHS	103.1 FM	Grasonville	Peter & John Fellowship, Inc.	Christian adult contemporary
WRQE	106.1 FM	Cumberland	FM Radio Licenses, LLC	Classic rock
WRSM	89.1 FM	Rising Sun	Hope Christian Church of Marlton, Inc.	Religious
WSBY-FM	98.9 FM	Salisbury	iHM Licenses, LLC	Urban adult contemporary
WSCL	89.5 FM	Salisbury	Salisbury University	Classical
WSDL	90.7 FM	Ocean City	Salisbury University	Jazz/Folk/R&B
WSHE	820 AM	Frederick	Washington Dc FCC License Sub, LLC	Freeform
WSJF-LP	92.7 FM	Eldersburg	St. Joseph's, Sykesville Roman Catholic Congregation, Inc	Catholic
WSMD-FM	98.3 FM	Mechanicsville	Somar Communications, Inc.	Top 40 (CHR)
WSRY	1550 AM	Elkton	Priority Radio, Inc.	Urban gospel
WTBO	1450 AM	Cumberland	FM Radio Licenses, LLC	Oldies
WTDK	107.1 FM	Federalsburg	WBOC, Inc.	Classic hits
WTGM	960 AM	Salisbury	iHM Licenses, LLC	Sports (FSR)
WTHU	1450 AM	Thurmont	Christian Radio Coalition, Inc.	Oldies
WTLP	103.9 FM	Braddock Heights	Washington DC FCC License Sub, LLC	All news
WTMD	89.7 FM	Towson	WYPR License Holding, LLC	Adult album alternative
WTRI	1520 AM	Brunswick	1520 Radio Asia LLC	Bollywood
WTTR	1470 AM	Westminster	Hilltop Communications, LLC	Full service
WTTZ-LP	93.5 FM	Baltimore	State of Maryland, MDOT, Maryland Transit Administration	Traffic Info/Smooth jazz
WVTO-LP	92.7 FM	Baltimore	The Benedictine Society of Baltimore City	Christian
WWEG	106.9 FM	Myersville	Manning Broadcasting, Inc.	Classic hits
WWFG	99.9 FM	Ocean City	iHM Licenses, LLC	Country
WWIN	1400 AM	Baltimore	Radio One Licenses, LLC	Urban gospel
WWIN-FM	95.9 FM	Glen Burnie	Radio One Licenses, LLC	Urban adult contemporary
WWMX	106.5 FM	Baltimore	Audacy License, LLC	Hot adult contemporary
WWOP-LP	100.3 FM	Ocean City	Town of Ocean City	Emergency Information
WWPN	101.1 FM	Westernport	Ernest F. Santmyire	Contemporary Christian
WWRC	570 AM	Bethesda	Caron Broadcasting, Inc.	Conservative talk
WXCY-FM	103.7 FM	Havre De Grace	FM Radio Licenses, LLC	Country
WXMD	89.7 FM	California	Redeemer Broadcasting, Inc.	Christian
WXSU-LP	96.3 FM	Salisbury	Salisbury University	Adult Alternative
WYPF	88.1 FM	Frederick	Your Public Radio Corporation	Public radio
WYPO	106.9 FM	Ocean City	WYPR License Holding LLC	Public radio
WYPR	88.1 FM	Baltimore	WYPR License Holding LLC	Public radio
WYRE	810 AM	Annapolis	Bay Broadcasting Corporation	Adult album alternative
WYZT-LP	104.7 FM	Annapolis	Maryland Hall for the Creative Arts, Inc.	Variety
WZFT	104.3 FM	Baltimore	iHM Licenses, LLC	Hot adult contemporary
WZHF	1390 AM	Capitol Heights	Way Broadcasting Licensee, LLC	Regional Mexican
WZXH	91.7 FM	Hagerstown	Four Rivers Community Broadcasting Corp.	Christian adult contemporary

== Defunct ==
- WBIS
- WGBG
- WGOP
- WHCP-LP
- WHFS (historic)
- WHRF
- WKIK
- WRYR-LP
- WWGB

== See also ==
- Maryland media
  - List of newspapers in Maryland
  - List of television stations in Maryland
  - Media of locales in Maryland: Baltimore, College Park, Cumberland, Frederick, Gaithersburg

== Bibliography ==
- Jack Alicoate, ed. (1939), "Maryland", Radio Annual, New York: Radio Daily, OCLC 2459636 – via Internet Archive
- "AM Stations in the U.S.: Maryland", Radio Annual Television Year Book, New York: Radio Television Daily, 1963, OCLC 10512375 – via Internet Archive

== Images ==
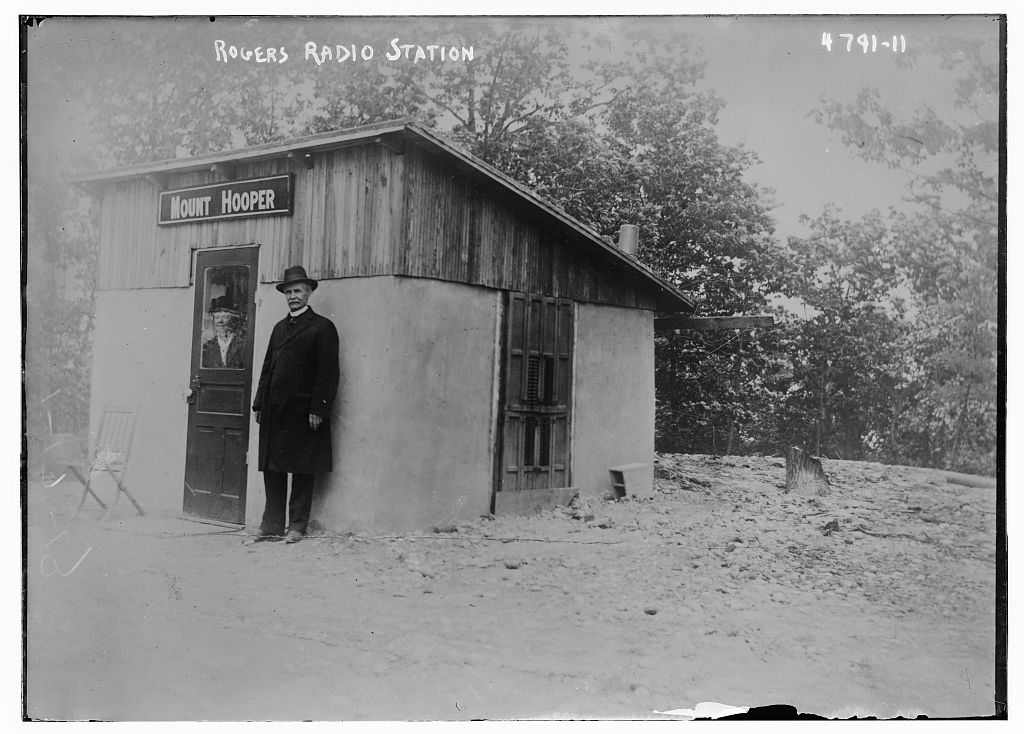
Radio inventor James Harris Rogers at his lab in Prince George's County, Maryland, circa 1910s

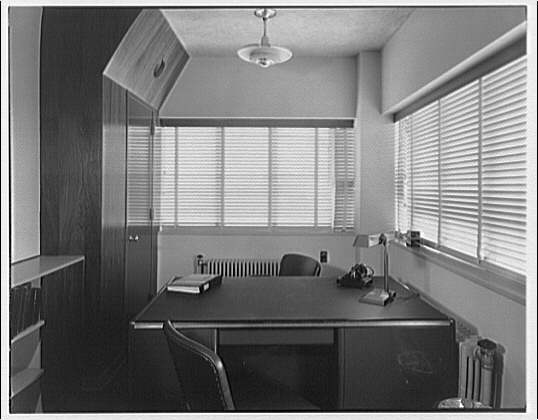
WJSV radio transmitter, Wheaton, Maryland, circa 1940s
