= WCEM (AM) =

- Cambridge, Maryland; United States
- Frequency: 1240 kHz

Ownership
- Owner: Draper Holdings Business Trust; (WBOC, Inc.)
- Sister stations: WAAI, WBOC-FM, WBOC-LD, WBOC-TV, WCEM-FM, WRDE-LD, WRUE-LD, WSJZ-LD, WTDK

History
- First air date: November 11, 1947
- Last air date: November 2024
- Former call signs: WCMD (1947–1949)
- Call sign meaning: Cambridge, Maryland

Technical information
- Facility ID: 46939
- Class: C
- Power: 1,000 watts
- Transmitter coordinates: 38°35′3.4″N 76°4′52.8″W

WCEM (1240 AM) was a commercial radio station licensed to Cambridge, Maryland, United States, that operated from 1947 until 2024. Last owned by the Draper Holdings Business Trust, the station featured a sports format at its closure.

== History ==
WCEM originally signed on the air on November 11, 1947. Its original call sign was WCMD and was known as "The Voice of the Shoremen". It became WCEM on December 2, 1949.

The station was previously owned by MTS Broadcasting Stations before being bought by Draper in 2018. It formerly broadcast nostalgic standards and talk radio before switching to the sports radio format in February 2019. Under the sports radio format the station broadcast Baltimore Orioles games, Baltimore Ravens games, University of Maryland football and basketball games, local high school football games, and the powerboat races on the Choptank River.

In October 2024, the station went silent after losing its tower site. The Federal Communications Commission cancelled the station's license on November 20, 2025.
