= WBOC =

WBOC may refer to:

- WBOC-FM, a radio station (102.5 FM) licensed to serve Princess Anne, Maryland, United States
- WBOC-TV, a television station (channel 32/virtual 16) licensed to serve Salisbury, Maryland
- WBOC-LD, a low-power television station (channel 22, virtual 42) licensed to serve Cambridge, Maryland
- WTGM, a radio station (960 AM) licensed to serve Salisbury, Maryland, which used the call sign WBOC from 1940 to 1980
- WQHQ, a radio station (104.7 FM) licensed to serve Ocean City-Salisbury, Maryland, which used the call sign WBOC-FM from 1965 to 1980
