= List of television stations in Maryland =

This is a list of broadcast television stations that are licensed in the U.S. state of Maryland.

== Full-power ==
- Stations are arranged by media market served and channel position.

Full-power television stations in Maryland
| Media market | Station | Channel | Primary affiliation(s) | Notes | Refs |
|---|---|---|---|---|---|
| Baltimore | WMAR-TV | 2 | ABC | | |
| Baltimore | WBAL-TV | 11 | NBC | | |
| Baltimore | WJZ-TV | 13 | CBS | | |
| Baltimore | WUTB | 24 | Roar | | |
| Baltimore | WBFF | 45 | Fox, MyNetworkTV on 45.2 | | |
| Baltimore | WNUV | 54 | The CW | | |
| Baltimore | WMPB | 67 | PBS | | |
| Hagerstown | WDVM-TV | 25 | Independent | | |
| Hagerstown | WWPB | 31 | PBS | (Note: Satellite of WMPB.) | |
| Salisbury | WBOC-TV | 16; 21 | CBS, Fox on 21.2 | | |
| Salisbury | WCPB | 28 | PBS | | |
| Salisbury | WMDT | 47 | ABC, The CW on 47.2 | | |
| ~Clarksburg, WV | WGPT | 36 | PBS | (Note: Licensed to Oakland, Maryland.) | |
| ~Washington, D.C. | WMPT | 22 | PBS | (Note: Licensed to Annapolis, Maryland.) | |
| ~Washington, D.C. | WFPT | 62 | PBS | (Note: Licensed to Frederick, Maryland.) | |
| ~Washington, D.C. | WJAL | 68 | LATV | (Note: Licensed to Silver Spring, Maryland.) | |

== Low-power ==
Low-power television stations in Maryland
| Media market | Station | Channel | Primary affiliation(s) | Notes | Refs |
|---|---|---|---|---|---|
| Baltimore | WMJF-CD | 39 | Various | (Note: Licensed to Towson, Maryland.) | |
| Baltimore | WWDD-LD | 49 | Daystar | | |
| Baltimore | WQAW-LD | 69 | Various | (Note: Licensed to Lake Shore, Maryland.) | |
| Salisbury | WRDE-LD | 31 | NBC, Cozi TV and MyNetworkTV on 31.2 | | |
| Salisbury | WGDV-LD | 32 | Various | | |
| Salisbury | WOWZ-LD | 33 | Various | | |
| Salisbury | W13DW-D | 35 | Infomericals | | |
| Salisbury | WBOC-LD | 42 | Telemundo | | |

== Translators ==
Television station translators in Maryland
| Media market | Station | Channel | Translating | Notes | Refs |
|---|---|---|---|---|---|
| Baltimore | WLZB-LD | 40 | WLYH | | |
| Salisbury | WRUE-LD | 31 | WRDE-LD | | |
| Salisbury | WSJZ-LD | 31; 42 | WRDE-LD; WBOC-LD | | |

== Defunct ==
- WMET-TV Baltimore (1967–1972)

== See also ==
- Maryland § Media
- List of television stations in Washington, D.C.

== Bibliography ==
- "United States TV Stations: Maryland", Yearbook of Radio and Television, New York: Radio Television Daily, 1964, OCLC 7469377 – via Internet Archive
