= WKIK =

WKIK can refer to:

- WKIK (FM), a radio station (102.9 FM) licensed to serve California, Maryland, United States
- WKIK (AM), a defunct radio station (1560 AM) formerly licensed to serve La Plata, Maryland
