= WRDE =

WRDE may refer to:

- WRDE-FM, a radio station (103.9 FM) licensed to serve Berlin, Maryland, United States
- WRDE-LD, a low-power television station (channel 26, virtual 31) licensed to serve Salisbury, Maryland
