= WWHC =

WWHC may refer to:

- WWHC-LD, a low-power television station (channel 20) licensed to serve Olean, New York, United States
- WKTQ (FM), a radio station (92.3 FM) licensed to serve Oakland, Maryland, United States, which held the call sign WWHC from 1995 to 2013
