= WKHJ =

WKHJ may refer to:

- WKHJ (FM), a radio station (104.5 FM) licensed to serve Mountain Lake Peak, Maryland, United States
- WXVE, a radio station (1570 AM) licensed to serve Latrobe, Pennsylvania, United States, which held the call sign WKHJ from 2018 to 2020
