= WSJF =

WSJF may refer to:

- Weighted shortest job first
- WSJF-LP, a low-power radio station (92.7 FM) licensed to serve Eldersburg, Maryland, United States
- a former call sign of the radio station WBHU
