= WYRX =

WYRX may refer to:

- WYRX-FM, a radio station (94.3 FM) licensed to Plymouth, Indiana, United States
- WMDM, a radio station (97.7 FM) licensed to Lexington Park, Maryland, United States, which held the call sign WYRX from 2006 to 2007 and 2007 to 2009
- WWSR, a radio station (93.1 FM) licensed to Lima, Ohio, United States, which held the call sign WYRX from 1993 to 1998
