= WGBG-FM =

- Fruitland, Maryland; United States
- Broadcast area: Salisbury-Ocean City, Maryland
- Frequency: 107.7 MHz
- Branding: Big 107.7

Programming
- Format: Classic rock
- Affiliations: United Stations Radio Networks

Ownership
- Owner: Draper Holdings Business Trust; (WBOC, Inc.)
- Sister stations: Radio: WAAI; WBOC-FM; WCEI-FM; WCEM-FM; WINX-FM; WRDE-FM; WTDK; WZBH; TV: WBOC-TV; WBOC-LD; WRDE-LD

History
- First air date: 1972 (as WEXM-FM at 107.5)
- Former call signs: WEXM-FM (1972–1983); WKRE-FM (1983–1996); WKHI (1996–2018)
- Former frequencies: 107.5 MHz (1972–2008)
- Call sign meaning: "Big"

Technical information
- Licensing authority: FCC
- Facility ID: 4107
- Class: B1
- ERP: 23,000 watts
- HAAT: 104.8 meters (344 ft)
- Transmitter coordinates: 38°23′0.4″N 75°24′51.7″W

Links
- Public license information: Public file; LMS
- Webcast: Listen live
- Website: bigclassicrock.com

WGBG-FM (107.7 MHz, "Big 107.7") is an American radio station licensed to serve the community of Fruitland, Maryland, with studios and cluster offices located in Salisbury, Maryland. The station's 23,000 watt signal can be heard at or near its transmitter on U.S. Route 50. Its tower is located in Pittsville, Maryland. The station broadcasts as a classic rock music formatted station branded as "Big 107.7". Programming features The Free Beer and Hot Wings Show, Doc West and Nights with Alice Cooper.

== History ==
Prior to moving to Fruitland, the station was licensed to Exmore, Virginia, and broadcast on a frequency of 107.5 FM. While in Exmore, the station had the call letters WKRE-FM, broadcast with 50,000 watts of power, and featured a country music format.

Prior to February 4, 2009, the station (as WKHI) broadcast an adult hits format as "Joe FM". On September 4, 2015, WKHI changed its format from classic rock to country, branded as "Your Country K107-7".

On August 17, 2018 at 5 p.m., WKHI changed its format from country to a simulcast of classic rock-formatted WGBG-FM 98.5 from Seaford, Delaware, branded as "Big 107.7"; the WGBG-FM call sign also moved to 107.7.

== Transmitter ==
The transmitter is a class B1 transmitter, 23,000 watts, HAAT 104.8 meters, located in Pittsville, Maryland. Facility ID 4107. Located at coordinates 38°23′0.4″N 75°24′51.7″W
