= WRFK =

WRFK may refer to:

- WRFK (FM), a radio station (107.1 FM) licensed to Barre, Vermont, United States
- WKIK (FM), a radio station (102.9 FM) licensed to California, Maryland, United States, which used the call sign WRFK from 1994 to 1997
- WBTJ, a radio station (106.5 FM) licensed to Richmond, Virginia, United States, which used the call signs WRFK and WRFK-FM from 1958 to 1988
