= WVOB =

Radio station in Dothan, Alabama

- Dothan, Alabama; United States
- Frequency: 91.3 MHz
- Branding: Gospel 91

Programming
- Format: Southern gospel

Ownership
- Owner: Bethany Divinity College & Seminary, Inc.

History
- First air date: 1988
- Last air date: 2025
- Call sign meaning: We're Voice Of Bethany

Technical information
- Licensing authority: FCC
- Facility ID: 4951
- Class: A
- ERP: 2,500 watts
- HAAT: 100 meters (330 ft)
- Transmitter coordinates: 31°10′57.6″N 85°24′20.7″W

Links
- Public license information: Public file; LMS

WVOB (91.3 FM, "Gospel 91") was a radio station broadcasting a southern gospel format. Licensed to Dothan, Alabama, United States, the station served the Dothan area. The station was owned by Bethany Divinity College & Seminary, Inc. The station's license was canceled on June 9, 2025, as it did not operate from an authorized location from 2018 until 2022 (longer than the one-year limit for going silent).

== Call sign history ==
Between 1963 and January 1982, the call sign WVOB was assigned to a radio station in Bel Air, Maryland, which became WHRF. The call sign meant, "voice of Bel Air".
