= WKIK (AM) =

Former simulcast of WKIK-FM, California, Maryland
- La Plata, Maryland; United States
- Broadcast area: Waldorf, Maryland; Alexandria, Virginia
- Frequency: 1560 kHz

Programming
- Format: Country

Ownership
- Owner: Somar Communications, Inc.
- Sister stations: WKIK-FM; WMDM; WPTX; WSMD-FM

History
- First air date: October 1965 (as WSMD)
- Last air date: March 2023
- Former call signs: WSMD (1965–1981); WXTR (1981–1986); WCMD (1986–1991); WMOM (1991–1994); WSMD (1994–1995)
- Call sign meaning: Former call letters of a defunct radio station in Leonardtown, Maryland, on 1370 AM

Technical information
- Facility ID: 60775
- Class: D
- Power: 1,000 watts (daytime); 250 watts (critical hours)
- Transmitter coordinates: 38°32′36.4″N 76°59′35″W

Links
- Website: country1029wkik.com

WKIK (1560 AM) was a United States commercial radio station serving La Plata and St. Charles, Maryland. The station broadcast a country music format, simulcast with WKIK-FM (102.9). WKIK was licensed to Somar Communications, Inc., and had a daytime-only license; 1560 AM is a United States clear-channel frequency.

The station was assigned the WKIK call letters by the Federal Communications Commission on September 25, 1995. The station surrendered its license on March 16, 2023; it was canceled the next day.
