= WKTQ =

WKTQ may refer to:

- WKTQ (FM), a radio station (92.3 FM) licensed to serve Oakland, Maryland, United States
- WPNO, a radio station (1450 AM) licensed to serve South Paris, Maine, United States, which held the call sign WKTQ from 1955 to 1973 and 1986 to 2016
- WJAS, a radio station (1320 AM) licensed to serve Pittsburgh, Pennsylvania, United States, which held the call sign WKTQ from 1973 to 1981
