= WXSU-LP =

Coordinates: 38.375°N 75.658°W

- Salisbury, Maryland; United States
- Frequency: 96.3 MHz
- Branding: WXSU 96.3

Programming
- Format: Variety
- Affiliations: Salisbury University

Ownership
- Owner: Salisbury University
- Sister stations: WSCL, WSDL

History
- Former call signs: WSSC; WSUR (?-2004)
- Call sign meaning: W Xtreme Salisbury University

Technical information
- Licensing authority: FCC
- Facility ID: 124825
- Class: L1
- ERP: 100 watts
- HAAT: 28.4 meters (93 ft)

Links
- Public license information: LMS

WXSU-LP (96.3 FM) is the student-run radio station at Salisbury University in Salisbury, Maryland. The station, formerly known as WSUR, was forced to change call letters when registering with the FCC because of an existing television station with those call letters in Puerto Rico. WXSU-LP first went live to the Salisbury community in 2005 with a low power, 100 watt signal. The station currently operates during the Fall and Spring semesters from Late August to Mid-May.

WXSU-LP is considered a "Big 6 Student Organization" at Salisbury University because it is one of the six top student organizations that receives block funding from the university. The station can be picked up around the Salisbury area and the studio is located in the Guerrieri Student Union. The station was formerly available on the campus cable system in partnership with SUTV. The campus cable system has since been discontinued. WXSU-LP online streaming as of August 2013 on UStream, but since has transitioned to a service with Caster.fm.

WXSU-LP works closely with the campus community and Registered Student Organizations to provide DJ services and promotions for meaningful events.

WXSU-LP is celebrating 40 years as a student-run radio organization from its beginning as WSSC in 1974. The first broadcast date of WSSC was November 6, 1974 and the first song to be played was "Enter the Young" by the Association.

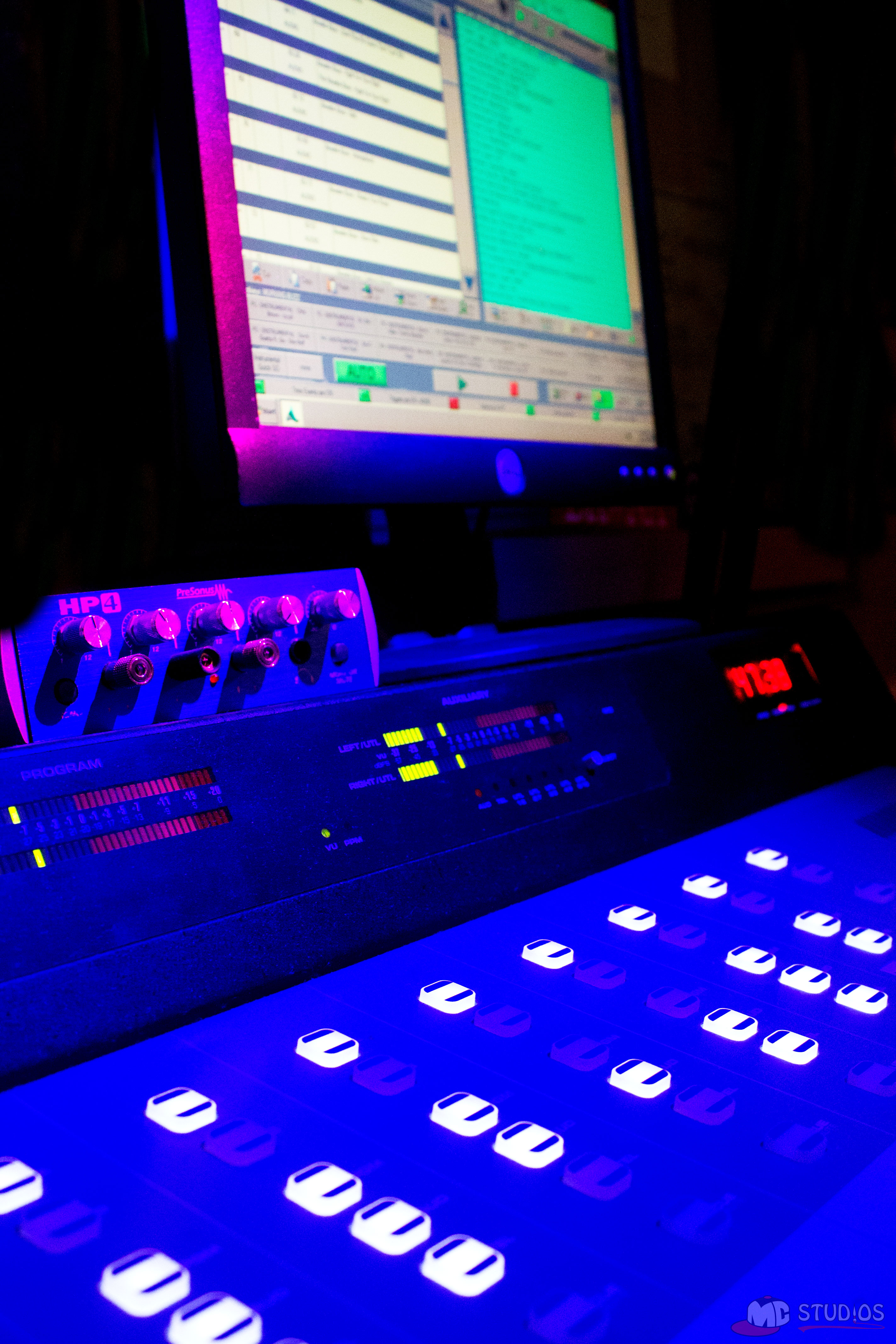

== History ==
=== WSSC ===
WSSCwas founded as a student-run radio station in 1973 when students felt that the campus of then Salisbury State College, was missing something. The founding members include Mike Seidel, Rick Holloway, and Christie Cannon. The station was located in the basement of Manokin Hall. The station originally broadcast on a carrier current AM channel and was known as WSSC 530AM. As the station and SSC began to grow, WSSC was moved to its next location in the gymnasium—Tawes Gym. (Tawes was located where Fulton Hall now stands today.) The station began broadcasting on the college's cable network on Channel 11, where it remained until the Summer of 2002, when it moved to Channel 44. The carrier current broadcast was dropped for an improved sound on a stereo cable frequency, 107.5 FM, and was broadcast both on campus, and throughout all of Salisbury via a local cable provider until Summer of 2002.

=== WSUR ===
In 1991, WSUR (renamed after the University was renamed to Salisbury State University in 1989) moved to its current location in the Guerrieri Student Union. In the fall of 1999, WSUR took an early jump into the 21st century and began a live audio stream that is sent all over the world first using Shoutcast, then later Windows Media Player and Real Player. As of 2026, the station broadcasts digitally from Caster.fm.

=== WXSU ===
On April 1, 2005, WSUR transitioned to WXSU (Xtreme Salisbury University).

In September 2020, WXSU installed a system called D.A.D., an automated program and scheduler which the station now runs on.

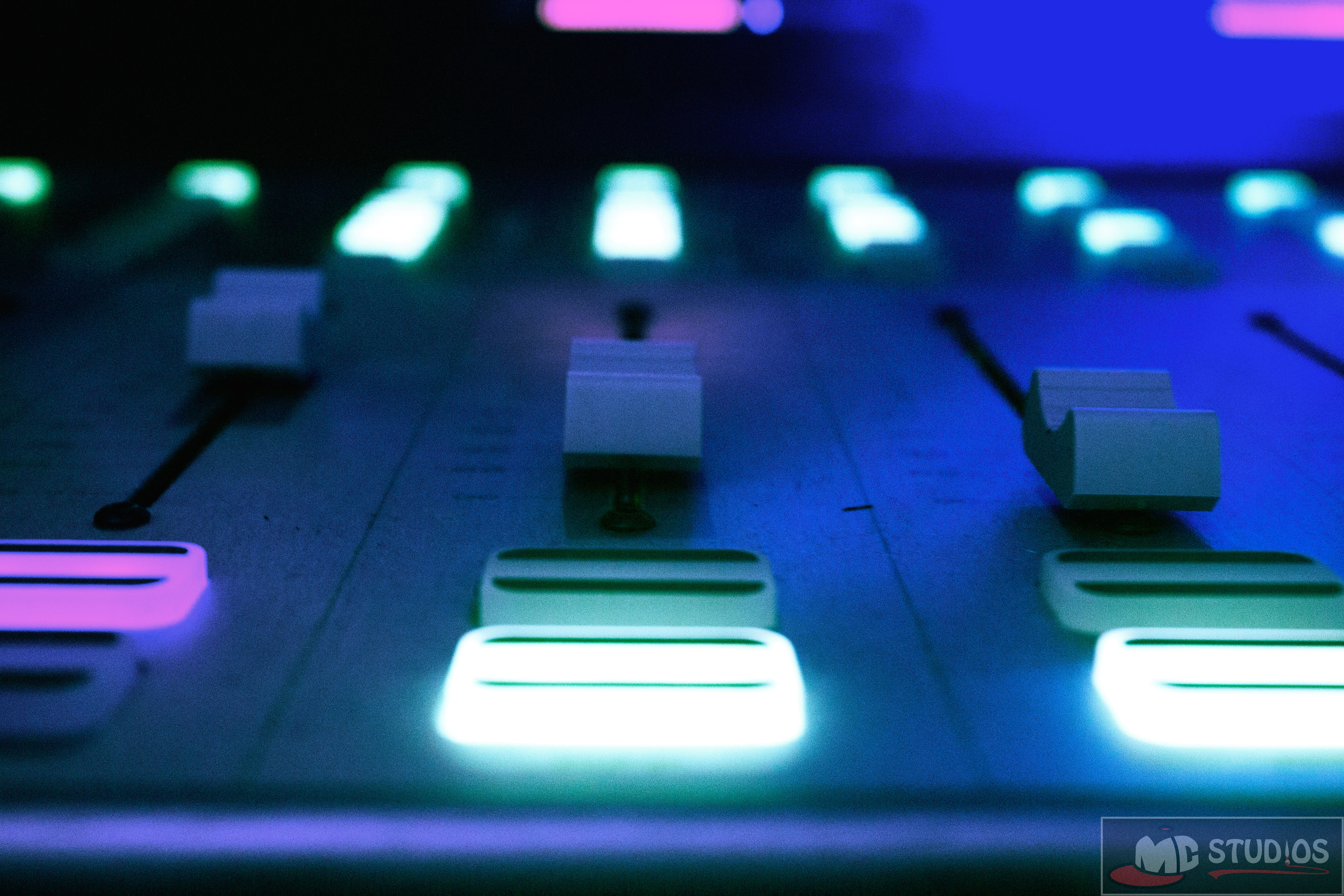

== See also ==
- Campus radio
- List of college radio stations in the United States
