= WKTZ-FM =

Simulcast of WMSG
- Loch Lynn Heights, Maryland; United States
- Broadcast area: Oakland, Maryland; Westernport, Maryland; Terra Alta, West Virginia; Keyser, West Virginia
- Frequency: 95.9 MHz
- Branding: Classic Hits Z95.9

Programming
- Format: Classic hits

Ownership
- Owner: Broadcast Communications, Inc.
- Sister stations: WKHJ; WKTQ; WMSG

History
- First air date: September 10, 1979
- Former call signs: WQIT-FM (1979–1982); WTBZ (1982–1986); WTBZ-FM (1986–2002); WDKL (2002–2015)

Technical information
- Licensing authority: FCC
- Facility ID: 64662
- Class: A
- ERP: 1,450 watts
- HAAT: 205.1 meters (673 ft)
- Transmitter coordinates: 39°24′36.2″N 79°17′15.6″W

Links
- Public license information: Public file; LMS
- Website: bciradio.net/wktz/index.html

WKTZ-FM (95.9 FM) is a classic hits formatted broadcast radio station licensed to Loch Lynn Heights, Maryland, serving Oakland and Westernport in Maryland and Terra Alta and Keyser in West Virginia. WKTZ-FM is owned and operated by Broadcast Communications, Inc. WKTZ-FM simulcasts sister station WMSG.
