= Channel 31 virtual TV stations in the United States =

The following television stations operate on virtual channel 31 in the United States:

- 'Unknown' in Pittsburgh, Pennsylvania
- K07AAD-D in Fort Worth, Texas
- K09YO-D in Thomasville, Colorado
- K10FQ-D in Big Laramie, etc., Wyoming
- K10RV-D in Centerville, Washington
- K12QM-D in Thomasville, Colorado
- K14KL-D in Pleasant Valley, Colorado
- K14LB-D in Idalia, Colorado
- K14OV-D in Snowmass Village, Colorado
- K15MD-D in Wray, Colorado
- K15MH-D in Anton, Colorado
- K18FN-D in Peetz, Colorado
- K18GD-D in Redstone, Colorado
- K22KW-D in Julesburg, Colorado
- K29GI-D in Holyoke, Colorado
- K31AD-D in Victorville, etc., California
- K31FD-D in Boise, Idaho
- K31FU-D in Golconda, Nevada
- K31HS-D in Malad, Idaho
- K31KH-D in Stateline, Nevada
- K31KT-D in Moses Lake, Washington
- K31KV-D in St. James, Minnesota
- K31MP-D in Grand Forks, North Dakota
- K31NF-D in Verde Valley, etc., Arizona
- K31NO-D in Bend, Oregon
- K31OE-D in Dove Creek, etc., Colorado
- K31PC-D in Yuma, Colorado
- K31PP-D in Sioux City, Iowa
- K31PR-D in Tyler, Texas
- K31PZ-D in Clarksville, Arkansas
- K31QA-D in Deadwood, South Dakota
- K33FI-D in Akron, Colorado
- K33GM-D in Haxtun, Colorado
- K33HY-D in Basalt, Colorado
- K34OS-D in Sterling/South Logan County, Colorado
- K35JY-D in Lamont, Oklahoma
- K35KI-D in St. James, Minnesota
- K36LA-D in Kabetogama, Minnesota
- KAGN-CD in Crowley, Louisiana
- KANG-LD in San Angelo, Texas
- KBID-LP in Fresno, California
- KBLT-LD in Anchorage, Alaska
- KBTF-CD in Bakersfield, California
- KDKF in Klamath Falls, Oregon
- KDVR in Denver, Colorado
- KEOT-LD in Abilene, Texas
- KEYU in Borger, Texas
- KFPB-LD in Gila River Indian Community, Arizona
- KIMG-LD in Ventura, California
- KLAX-TV in Alexandria, Louisiana
- KLDY-LD in Anchorage, Alaska
- KLHO-LD in Oklahoma City, Oklahoma
- KMAX-TV in Sacramento, California
- KNBX-CD in Las Vegas, Nevada
- KPBI-CD in Bentonville, Arkansas
- KPLE-CD in Killeen, Texas
- KSMV-LD in Los Angeles, California
- KTFO-CD in Austin, Texas
- KTNW in Richland, Washington
- KTPE-LD in Kansas City, Missouri
- KVDF-CD in San Antonio, Texas
- KVMD in Twentynine Palms, California
- KVUI in Pocatello, Idaho
- KWBM in Harrison, Arkansas
- KXOF-CD in Laredo, Texas
- W16DU-D in Bloomington, Wisconsin
- W31DV-D in Guayama, Puerto Rico
- W31EP-D in Destin, Florida
- W31FA-D in Elmhurst, Michigan
- W31FD-D in Bluffton-Hilton Head, South Carolina
- W31FF-D in Maple Valley, Michigan
- W32FJ-D in Montgomery, Alabama
- W39CV-D in Minocqua, Wisconsin
- WAAY-TV in Huntsville, Alabama
- WAHU-LD in Crozet, Virginia
- WAXC-LD in Alexander City, Alabama
- WCRN-LD in Boston, Massachusetts
- WDKT-LD in Hendersonville, North Carolina
- WDMA-CD in Macon, Georgia
- WEYS-LD in Miami, Florida
- WFXL in Albany, Georgia
- WHIG-CD in Rocky Mount, North Carolina
- WHLA-TV in La Crosse, Wisconsin
- WIIC-LD in Pittsburgh, Pennsylvania
- WJDE-CD in Nashville, Tennessee
- WJNI-LD in North Charleston, South Carolina
- WKME-CD in Kississimee, Florida
- WKOH in Owensboro, Kentucky
- WMBD-TV in Peoria, Illinois
- WMKG-CD in Muskegon, Michigan
- WMVJ-CD in Melbourne, Florida
- WNNE in Hartford, Vermont
- WPBM-CD in Scottsville, Kentucky
- WPXD-TV in Ann Arbor, Michigan
- WPXN-TV in New York, New York
- WRDE-LD in Salisbury, Maryland
- WRPT in Hibbing, Minnesota
- WRUE-LD in Salisbury, Maryland
- WRZB-LD in Washington, D.C.
- WSPY-LD in Earlville, Illinois
- WTMO-CD in Orlando, Florida
- WTWL-LD in Wilmington, North Carolina
- WUBX-CD in Durham, etc., North Carolina
- WUHF in Rochester, New York
- WUNU in Lumberton, North Carolina
- WVND-LD in Gainesville, Georgia
- WWPB in Hagerstown, Maryland

The following stations, which are no longer licensed, formerly operated on virtual channel 31 in the United States:

- K03IS-D in Sioux City, Iowa
- K21HF-D in Aspen, Colorado
- K24JR-D in Orr, Minnesota
- K31HO-D in Shreveport, Louisiana
- K31KR-D in Three Forks, Montana
- K31KU-D in Rapid City, South Dakota
- K31LL-D in Midland/Odessa, Texas
- KBLI-LD in Lincoln, Nebraska
- KGFZ-LD in Yakima, etc., Washington
- KXOK-LD in Enid, Oklahoma
- W17EQ-D in Byromville, Georgia
- W31CZ-D in Tampa, Florida
- W31DZ-D in Clarksdale, Mississippi
- W31EX-D in Bangor, Maine
- WDDM-LD in Tallahassee, Florida
- WSJU-TV in San Juan, Puerto Rico
- WUDJ-LD in Crozet, Virginia
- WUDP-LD in Lafayette, Indiana
