= WZBH =

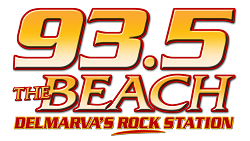
- Millsboro, Delaware; United States
- Broadcast area: Delmarva
- Frequency: 93.5 MHz
- Branding: 93.5 The Beach

Programming
- Format: Active rock
- Affiliations: United Stations Radio Networks

Ownership
- Owner: Draper Holdings Business Trust; (WBOC Inc.)
- Sister stations: Radio: WBOC-FM; WAAI; WCEI-FM; WCEM-FM; WGBG-FM; WINX-FM; WRDE-FM; WTDK; TV: WBOC-TV; WBOC-LD; WRDE-LD

History
- First air date: July 4, 1969; 57 years ago
- Former call signs: WSEA (1969–1988)
- Call sign meaning: "Beach"

Technical information
- Licensing authority: FCC
- Facility ID: 25003
- Class: B
- ERP: 50,000 watts
- HAAT: 150 meters (490 ft)
- Transmitter coordinates: 38.523°N 75.298°W

Links
- Public license information: Public file; LMS
- Webcast: Listen live
- Website: www.935thebeach.com

WZBH (93.5 FM) is an American radio station licensed to the community of Millsboro, Delaware. The station serves the Delmarva peninsula, which includes Salisbury, Maryland, Ocean City, Maryland, Southern Delaware, and Virginia's Eastern Shore, with studios and cluster offices located in Salisbury. Its tower is located in Dagsboro, Delaware and stands 468 feet (143 meters). The station broadcasts as an active rock music formatted station branded as "93.5 The Beach". Programming features J. Lee & Sarah - The Morning Show, Middays with Drew, Afternoons with Tyler D., Generation X Rated, HardDriveXL, and Full Metal Jackie.

== History ==
Up until the late 1980s, this station had the call letters WSEA and featured a top-40 format. Call letters were changed to WZBH and a more mainstream album-oriented rock format was featured at first, and then an active rock format later. In September 2015, the studios were relocated from Georgetown, Delaware, to Salisbury, Maryland.
