= WTTZ-LP =

- Baltimore, Maryland; United States
- Broadcast area: Baltimore metropolitan area
- Frequency: 93.5 MHz
- Branding: "The Maryland Transportation Channel"

Programming
- Format: Traffic information Smooth jazz

Ownership
- Owner: Maryland Transit Administration; (State of Maryland, MDOT, Maryland Transit Administration)
- Sister stations: WMVK-LP

History
- First air date: March 17, 2016

Technical information
- Licensing authority: FCC
- Facility ID: 193908
- Class: L1
- Power: 4 watts
- HAAT: 151.7 meters (498 ft)
- Transmitter coordinates: 39°20′10.0″N 76°38′59.0″W

Links
- Public license information: LMS
- Webcast: Listen Live

WTTZ-LP is a traffic information and smooth jazz formatted broadcast radio station licensed to and serving Baltimore, Maryland. WTTZ-LP is owned and operated by Maryland Transit Administration. WTTZ-LP is also simulcasted on WMVK-LP in Perryville, Maryland and covers Havre De Grace, Maryland, Elkton, Maryland and Northeast, Maryland and the surrounding area, especially along I-95. This radio can also be played on TuneIn and other 3rd party sites.

== Coverage and Programming ==
WTTZ-LP's antenna is located on one of the two towers on Television Hill in the Woodberry section of Baltimore. Due to the height of the tower, the station, operating at just 4 watts, can be heard around the Baltimore Metro area.

The station provides traffic and transit information from various Maryland state transportation organizations including the Maryland Transit Administration, the Maryland Aviation Administration, the Maryland Transportation Authority and the Maryland State Highway Administration, as well as the Maryland Port Administration and the Maryland Motor Vehicle Administration.

The traffic and transit information is aired from 5:00am to 9:00am and 2:00pm to 6:00pm local time. Outside of these hours, the station airs a Smooth Jazz format.

WTTZ-LP, along with WBQH, agreed on May 16, 2022 to broadcast Baltimore Ravens games in Spanish beginning with the upcoming season.
