= WKHJ (FM) =

- Mountain Lake Park, Maryland; United States
- Broadcast area: Garrett County, Maryland; Preston County, West Virginia; Western Maryland; Potomac Highlands of West Virginia
- Frequency: 104.5 MHz
- Branding: 104.5 KHJ

Programming
- Format: Adult Contemporary
- Affiliations: Westwood One

Ownership
- Owner: Robert and Ashley Stevens; (Broadcast Communications, Inc.)
- Sister stations: WKTQ, WKTZ-FM, WMSG

History
- First air date: July 9, 1990; 35 years ago
- Former call signs: WKHJ (1988–2018); WKHJ-FM (2018–2020)
- Former frequencies: 98.9 MHz (1990–1999)
- Call sign meaning: Inspired by Los Angeles radio station KHJ

Technical information
- Licensing authority: FCC
- Facility ID: 61304
- Class: A
- ERP: 1,550 watts
- HAAT: 200.2 meters (657 ft)
- Transmitter coordinates: 39°24′36.20″N 79°17′15.60″W

Links
- Public license information: Public file; LMS
- Website: bciradio.net/wkhj/index.html

WKHJ (104.5 FM) is an adult contemporary formatted radio station. The station is licensed to Mountain Lake Park, Maryland and serves Garrett County and Western Maryland in Maryland and Preston County and the Potomac Highlands in West Virginia in the United States. WKHJ is owned by Robert and Ashley Stevens and operated under their Broadcast Communications, Inc. licensee.

The station shares studios with sister stations WKTQ, WKTZ-FM, and WMSG at 407 Lothian Street in Loch Lynn Heights, near Oakland.

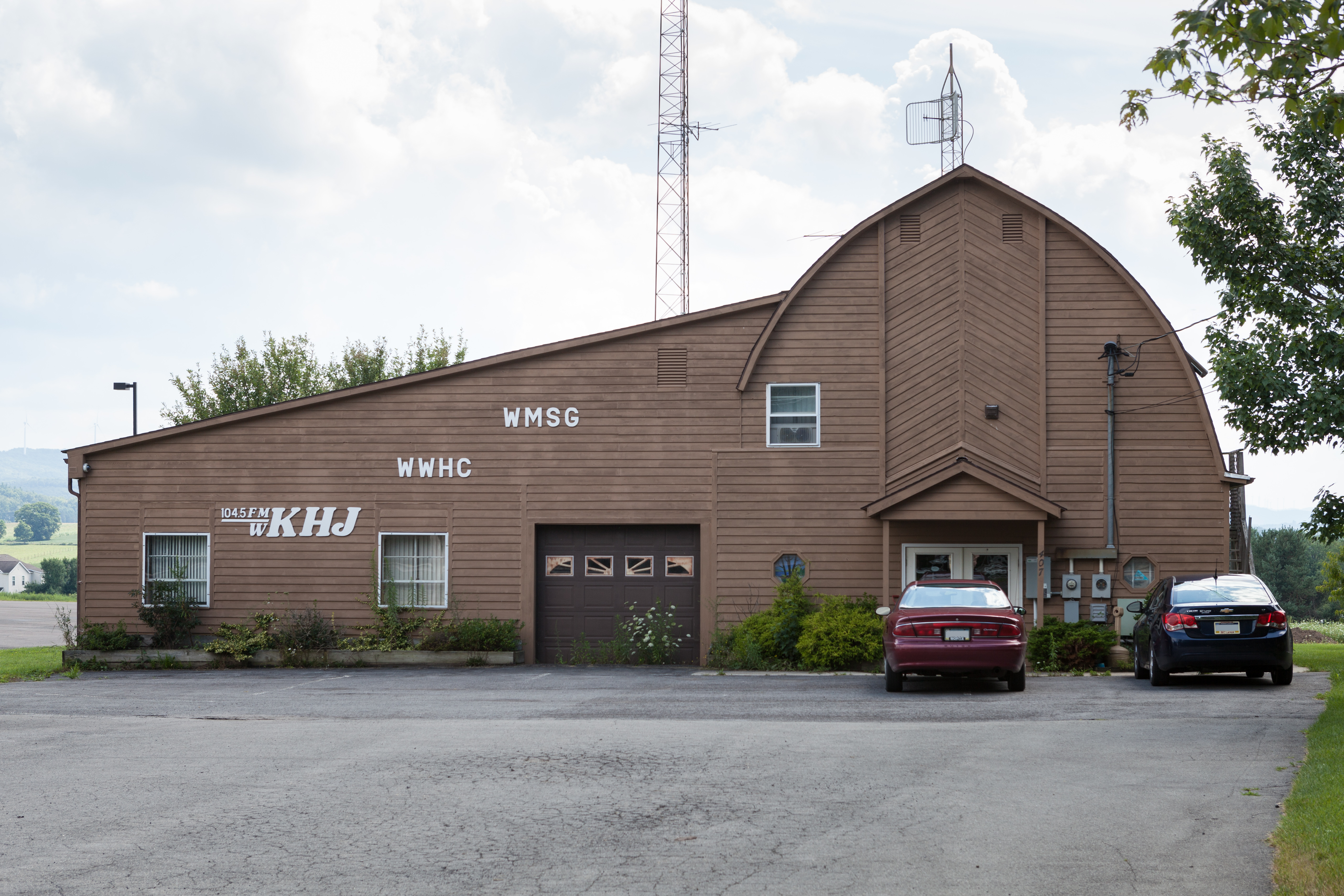
Studio in Loch Lynn Heights, Maryland
