= WDON (AM) =

- Wheaton, Maryland; United States
- Broadcast area: Washington metropolitan area
- Frequency: 1540 kHz
- Branding: Vida en Abundancia Radio

Programming
- Language: Spanish
- Format: Catholic

Ownership
- Owner: Renovación Media Group

History
- First air date: 1954
- Former call signs: WDON (1953–1981); WMDO (1981–1997); WACA (1997–2021)
- Call sign meaning: Don Dillard, son of original station owner Everett Dillard

Technical information
- Licensing authority: FCC
- Facility ID: 38439
- Class: D
- Power: 5,000 watts (day); 1,000 watts critical hours
- Transmitter coordinates: 39°0′50″N 77°1′46″W

Links
- Public license information: Public file; LMS
- Website: vidaenabundancia.net

WDON (1540 AM) is a radio station in the United States. Licensed to Wheaton, Maryland, the station serves the Washington metropolitan area with a Catholic format in Spanish, branded as Radio Vida en Abundancia (Life in Abundance Radio). It is owned by the Renovación Media Group.

Founded in 1953, WDON was originally a music station, named after its disc jockey Don Dillard, who was among the first hosts to play rock and roll on Washington radio. WDON later had a country format in the 1960s, followed by oldies and disco in the late 1970s. WDON pivoted away from music, starting with a religious format in 1980. Since 1981, WDON has had various Spanish-language formats, starting with a full-service format of news, talk, and music, followed by Christian programming since 2019. The call sign changed to WMDO from 1981 and WACA in 1997, before returning to its original WDON in 2021.

== History ==
=== Early years (1953–1981) ===
WDON was first licensed on December 4, 1953, as a daytimer powered at 250 watts. The station first signed on in 1954. It was founded by Everett L. Dillard, who previously built and signed-on Washington's second FM station, WASH (97.1 FM), in 1945. He chose the call letters for his son Don, who was also a DJ at the station. Don Dillard is credited for introducing rock and roll to Washington radio and also played rhythm and blues, doo-wop, and rockabilly on his shows; he was popular among white teenagers in Northwest Washington and suburbs in neighboring Montgomery County, Maryland. Future notable Washingtonians Carl Bernstein and Ben Stein were listeners to Don Dillard's show.

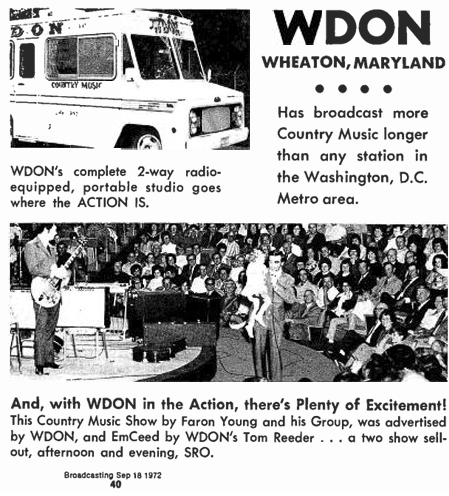
1972 station advertisement.

By the early 1960s, WDON shifted its format to country music. Following a two-year construction permit, WDON increased its power to 1,000 watts in 1962. WDON began a weekly concert show, Country Showcase America Jamboree, around 1971.

In 1974, Everett Dillard sold WDON to Horizon Communications Corporation for $425,000. The country format continued into 1975, before Horizon changed the format to oldies. In April 1979, WDON briefly switched to disco as "Disco D-O-N". Then in 1980, WDON dropped disco for religious programming, including contemporary Christian music.

=== Spanish-language programming (1981–present) ===
WDON changed its call sign to WMDO on September 8, 1981. Nearly two weeks later on September 24, California-based Lotus Communications purchased WMDO for $700,000. On December 14 that year, WMDO launched a full-time Spanish language format branded "Radio Mundo". It featured news, public service announcements, and music targeted towards Central and South American immigrants in the Washington area. which was later co-owned by Los Cerezos Television Company with the Washington market's first Univision television station (which is now WMDO-CD).

In 1997, WMDO news anchor Alejandro Carrasco leased the station; the call letters changed to WACA on June 13. Carrasco later moved to WILC in Laurel, rising to be general manager, and then returned to WACA to begin a 30-minute morning show, Calentando la Mañana (Heating Up the Morning), in 1987. After the lease expired, Carrasco bought WMDO in 2000 for $2.7 million, naming it "Radio América".

In 2019, Carrasco purchased the 900 kHz facility and moved Radio América programming there. WACA was leased out that January and switched to Spanish-language Christian programming as Vida en Abundancia. In 2021, Renovación Media Group, headed by Father Roberto Cortés Campos, purchased the station for $700,000; the WACA call letters moved to 900 upon the consummation of the sale, and the WDON call letters returned to Wheaton for the first time in 40 years.

== Technical information ==
Broadcasting during daytime hours only, WDON is powered at 5,000 watts and broadcasts from a non-directional antenna in Silver Spring near the Capital Beltway. The signal coverage is strongest in the cities of Washington and Alexandria, along with most of Montgomery and Prince George's counties. During critical hours, it reduces power to 1,000 watts, because 1540 AM is a clear channel frequency.
