= WRDE-FM =

- Berlin, Maryland; United States
- Broadcast area: Delmarva
- Frequency: 103.9 MHz (HD Radio)
- Branding: Coast Country 103.9/106.3

Programming
- Format: Country
- Subchannels: HD2: Classic hits (WTDK simulcast)
- Affiliations: Compass Media Networks; Premiere Networks

Ownership
- Owner: Draper Holdings Business Trust; (WBOC, Inc.)
- Sister stations: Radio: WAAI; WBOC-FM; WCEI-FM; WCEM-FM; WGBG-FM; WINX-FM; WTDK; WZBH; TV: WBOC-TV; WBOC-LD; WRDE-LD

History
- First air date: June 25, 1981
- Former call signs: WOCQ (1981–2022)
- Call sign meaning: Rehoboth, Delaware (original location for sister station WRDE-LD)

Technical information
- Licensing authority: FCC
- Facility ID: 47107
- Class: A
- ERP: 6,000 watts
- HAAT: 100 meters (330 ft)
- Transmitter coordinates: 38.383°N 75.316°W
- Translators: HD2: 104.3 W282AW (Salisbury); HD2: 105.1 W286BB (Ocean Pines)
- Repeater: 106.3 WCEM-FM (Cambridge)

Links
- Public license information: Public file; LMS
- Webcast: Listen live
- Website: www.coastcountry.com

WRDE-FM (103.9 MHz) is an American radio station in the Delmarva region of Maryland. The station is licensed to serve Berlin, Maryland, although its studios and main offices are located in the larger nearby city of Salisbury. WRDE-FM is owned by Draper Holdings Business Trust. The station, along with WCEM-FM 106.3 in Cambridge, broadcasts a country music format. Its transmitter tower stands 348 feet (106 meters) and is located in Whaleyville.

== History ==
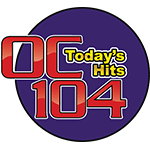
Logo as "OC104"

On March 1, 2022, the then-WOCQ dropped its "OC104" top 40 format and began stunting with a loop directing listeners to hot adult contemporary-formatted WBOC-FM 102.5.

WOCQ changed its call sign to WRDE-FM on March 3, 2022. On March 4, 2022, at 12 noon, WRDE-FM ended stunting and launched a country music format, branded as "Coast Country 103.9/106.3" (with a simulcast on WCEM-FM 106.3 in Cambridge).

== Air personalities ==
The station features Big D and Bubba in the morning and April Brilliant and Gary John during the day, both who have broadcast on Delmarva radio for decades.

== Transmitter ==
The transmitter is a class A transmitter, 6,000 watts, HAAT 100 meters (330 ft), located in Whaleyville, Maryland, located at coordinates 38.383°N 75.316°W.

== HD Radio ==
On April 3, 2017, WOCQ-HD2 launched an oldies format, branded as "Kool Oldies 104.3 & 105.1", simulcasting on translators W282AW (104.3 FM) in Salisbury and W286BB (105.1 FM) in Ocean City. On March 1, 2022, WOCQ-HD2 and its translators changed their format from oldies to a simulcast of classic hits-formatted WTDK (107.1 FM), branded as "The Duck".
