= WSCL =

Public radio station in Salisbury, Maryland

- Salisbury, Maryland; United States
- Broadcast area: Salisbury-Ocean City
- Frequency: 89.5 MHz
- Branding: WSCL 89.5 Classical Delmarva

Programming
- Format: Classical music
- Affiliations: NPR; Public Radio Exchange

Ownership
- Owner: Salisbury University
- Sister stations: WESM, WSDL, WXSU-LP

History
- First air date: May 29, 1987

Technical information
- Licensing authority: FCC
- Facility ID: 58660
- Class: B
- ERP: 36,000 watts
- HAAT: 136 meters (446 ft)
- Transmitter coordinates: 38°40′0″N 75°34′59″W

Links
- Public license information: Public file; LMS
- Webcast: Listen live
- Website: www.delmarvapublicmedia.org

WSCL (89.5 FM) is a NPR member station in Salisbury, Maryland, owned by Salisbury University.

WSCL's signal takes advantage of the flat geography of Delmarva. It can be heard on car radios in portions of Northern Delaware and its bordering areas of Pennsylvania, across the Delaware Bay in New Jersey, along Interstate 95 between Baltimore and Washington, in addition to its local areas of Delaware, Maryland, and Virginia.
