= WINX-FM =

Radio station in Saint Michaels, Maryland

- Saint Michaels, Maryland; United States
- Broadcast area: Saint Michaels, Maryland; Easton, Maryland
- Frequency: 94.3 MHz
- Branding: 94.3 Dockside Radio

Programming
- Format: Variety

Ownership
- Owner: Draper Holdings Business Trust; (WBOC, Inc.)
- Sister stations: Radio: WAAI; WBOC-FM; WCEI-FM; WCEM-FM; WGBG-FM; WRDE-FM; WTDK; WZBH; TV: WBOC-TV; WBOC-LD; WRDE-LD

History
- First air date: July 25, 1990 (as WFBR)
- Former call signs: WFBR (1990–2002)

Technical information
- Licensing authority: FCC
- Facility ID: 14774
- Class: A
- ERP: 4,600 watts
- HAAT: 110 meters (360 ft)
- Transmitter coordinates: 38°37′49.4″N 76°3′23.8″W

Links
- Public license information: Public file; LMS
- Webcast: Listen live
- Website: www.943dockside.com

WINX-FM (94.3 MHz) is a radio station in Saint Michaels, Maryland, United States. The station is currently owned by Draper Holdings Business Trust, through licensee WBOC, Inc. WINX-FM broadcasts a variety format.

== History ==
The station was assigned the call sign WFBR on July 25, 1990. On July 7, 2002, the station changed its call sign to the current WINX-FM.

The call letters WINX were previously assigned to a station in Rockville, Maryland, from 1951.

In October 2016, Forever Media acquired WINX-FM and WCEI-FM from First Media Radio for $6.5 million.

In June 2025, Forever Media sold six of its stations (including WINX-FM) to Draper Media for $11 million.

On December 29, 2025, WINX-FM changed their format from country (after stunting with country Christmas music) to a mixture of yacht rock, coastal country and acoustic chill, branded as "94.3 Dockside Radio".
