= WCEI-FM =

Radio station in Easton, Maryland

- Easton, Maryland; United States
- Broadcast area: Baltimore, Maryland; Annapolis, Maryland
- Frequency: 96.7 MHz (HD Radio)
- Branding: 96.7 WCEI

Programming
- Format: Adult contemporary

Ownership
- Owner: Draper Holdings Business Trust; (WBOC, Inc.)
- Sister stations: Radio: WAAI; WBOC-FM; WCEM-FM; WGBG-FM; WINX-FM; WRDE-FM; WTDK; WZBH; TV: WBOC-TV; WBOC-LD; WRDE-LD

History
- First air date: 1975 (as WEMD-FM)
- Former call signs: WEMD-FM (1975–1981)
- Call sign meaning: Clark Enterprises, Inc. (former owner)

Technical information
- Licensing authority: FCC
- Facility ID: 11668
- Class: B1
- ERP: 12,500 watts (analog); 125 watts (digital)
- HAAT: 141 meters (463 ft)
- Transmitter coordinates: 38°57′22.2″N 76°05′34.4″W

Links
- Public license information: Public file; LMS
- Webcast: Listen live
- Website: www.967wcei.com

WCEI-FM (96.7 MHz, "96.7 WCEI") is a commercial radio station broadcasting an adult contemporary format. Licensed to serve Easton, Maryland, United States, the station is owned by Draper Holdings Business Trust, through licensee WBOC, Inc. The station's broadcast tower is located near Wye Mills, Maryland, at (38°57′22.2″N 76°05′34.4″W). Although WCEI is officially licensed to Easton, the station's reach includes the Baltimore area, as it can be heard clearly in most parts of the city and surrounding areas.

== History ==
The station went on the air as WEMD-FM in 1975 simulcasting its AM sister station WEMD which had a middle of the road format along with news, farm reports, and local happenings. On December 21, 1981, the station changed its call sign to the current WCEI-FM to represent the new owners, Clark Enterprises Incorporated. On August 24, 1985, WCEI-FM became an affiliate of American Top 40 with Casey Kasem.

In its early years, WEMD-FM was a 3,000 watt station. Sometime in the mid-late 1980s, WCEI-FM asked for a power increase due to the fact that it was an Emergency Alert System Carrier and needed a more powerful reach and penetration into businesses and homes. The ask was roughly for 10,000 watts but the station was given an increase to a B1 - 12,500 watts.

Previous logo

In October 2016, Forever Media acquired WCEI-FM and WINX-FM from First Media Radio for $6.5 million.

In June 2025, Forever Media sold six of its stations (including WCEI-FM) to Draper Media for $11 million.
