= WACA (AM) =

Spanish-language news/talk radio station in Laurel, Maryland, U.S.

- Laurel, Maryland; United States
- Broadcast area: Washington, D.C. metropolitan area
- Frequency: 900 kHz
- Branding: Radio America 900

Programming
- Language: Spanish
- Format: News/Talk and music

Ownership
- Owner: Alejandro Carrasco; (ACR Media, Inc.)

History
- First air date: 1965
- Former call signs: WLMD (1964–1985); WILC (1985–2018); WCLM (2018–2021)
- Call sign meaning: Initials of its owner Alejandro Carrasco, (Radio) America

Technical information
- Licensing authority: FCC
- Facility ID: 28279
- Class: B
- Power: 1,900 watts (day); 500 watts (night)

Links
- Public license information: Public file; LMS
- Website: radioamerica.net

WACA is a Spanish news/talk formatted broadcast radio station licensed to Laurel, Maryland, serving the Washington, D.C. metropolitan area. It is owned by Alejandro Carrasco, through licensee ACR Media, Inc.

900 AM is a Canadian and Mexican clear-channel frequency.

== History ==
From 1965 to the early 1980s, the station (then WLMD) broadcast a succession of formats in English; several radio personalities began their careers with the station.

Before 1969, WLMD was a MOR (Middle Of The Road) formatted radio station and held to the model created by WMAL and WBAL in Washington and Baltimore, respectively. Its dismal ratings, primarily due to being a relatively low power AM station only broadcasting during the day with a poor coverage area, led to a format change beginning in 1975. The new Progressive Country music format was loved by the small audience it attracted and ratings increased modestly. The station changed its call sign to WILC on December 19, 1985.

ZGS Communications, then the owner of Telemundo affiliate WZDC-CD, purchased WILC in 2002.

On March 14, 2011, WILC flipped to a Spanish adult contemporary format as Romantica 900 AM. On February 3, 2014, the station changed formats to Conservative Talk; with a more Libertarian emphasis. On the same date, Wallis Communications began operating the station under a local marketing agreement. On November 5, 2014, WILC changed their format back to Spanish adult contemporary, branded as "Romantica 900".

From January 1, 2016, WILC was operated by Alejandro Carrasco under a local marketing agreement. The station continued with a Spanish adult contemporary format branded "Radio America 900" to correspond with Carrasco's news-talk WACA, long known as "Radio America 1540". As part of its exit from broadcasting, ZGS sold to Carrasco for $700,000 on January 29, 2018. WILC was ZGS' last remaining broadcast property after selling its television stations to Telemundo in the same month. Carrasco closed on the purchase of WILC on April 10, 2018, and then changed the station's call sign to WCLM on April 25, 2018. At the beginning of 2019, the news/talk programming moved from the daytimer 1540 AM, which was then leased to a local Catholic broadcaster. With the outright sale of 1540 AM (now WDON) closing in July 2021, the WACA callsign relocated to 900 AM, replacing WCLM, where the station commenced 24/7 broadcasting.
