= WMVK-LP =

- Perryville, Maryland; United States
- Broadcast area: Cecil County, Maryland
- Frequency: 107.3 MHz
- Branding: "The Maryland Transportation Channel"

Programming
- Format: Traffic Information; Smooth Jazz

Ownership
- Owner: Maryland Transit Administration; (State of Maryland Department of Transportation)
- Sister stations: WTTZ-LP

History
- First air date: November 3, 2003
- Former call signs: WMVK (2003-)

Technical information
- Licensing authority: FCC
- Facility ID: 124828
- Class: L1
- ERP: 8 watts
- HAAT: 102.4 meters (336 feet)
- Transmitter coordinates: 39°35′22″N 76°04′25″W

Links
- Public license information: LMS
- Webcast: Listen Live or TuneIn

WMVK-LP (107.3 FM) is a non-commercial radio station licensed to serve Perryville, Maryland. The station is owned by the Maryland Transit Administration and licensed to the State of Maryland Department of Transportation. It airs a Smooth Jazz format which includes easy listening music, transit information, and drive-time commuter reports.

The station was assigned the WMVK-LP call letters by the Federal Communications Commission on April 3, 2003.

The station simulcasts the programming from its sister station, WTTZ-LP which is based in the Baltimore Metro Area.
