= Draper Holdings Business Trust =

Media and real estate company

- Type: Private
- Founder: Thomas H. Draper
- Headquarters: Milton, Delaware
- Key people: Molly Draper Russell, CEO

The Draper Holdings Business Trust is a business trust company, located in Milton, Delaware. It is led by Molly Draper Russell, who inherited the company from her father, Thomas Draper, upon his death in 2018.

The philanthropic division of the trust, Draper Holdings Charitable Foundation, Inc., includes WBOC's "Bless Our Children" program which raised and distributed $343,536 in funds in 2022 "to help the children in need on Delmarva". An additional $213,500 was granted to "provide funding to tax-exempt charitable, religious, educations or scientific institutions".

In 2007, Draper Holdings Business Trust donated a professional broadcast news set to the University of Maryland Eastern Shore to aid in the production of student programming. The set was previously used by WBOC-TV.

== Companies owned by the trust ==
- Loblolly, LLC – Real Estate Holding Company
- Draper Media
- Delmarva Sports Network - local sports network
- Television stations (Delmarva area)
  - WBOC-TV – CBS/Fox affiliate
  - WRDE-LD – NBC affiliate
  - WBOC-LD – Telemundo affiliate
  - WRUE-LD - satellite of WRDE-LD
  - WSJZ-LD – satellite of WBOC-LD
- Radio stations (Delmarva area)
  - WBOC-FM – Top 40 radio station
  - WAAI – Classic country radio station
  - WCEI-FM – Adult contemporary adult radio station
  - WCEM – Former CBS Sports Radio affiliate
  - WCEM-FM – Mainstream country radio station
  - WGBG-FM – Classic rock radio station
  - WINX-FM – Variety radio station
  - WTDK – Oldies radio station
  - WZBH – Active rock radio station
  - WRDE-FM – satellite of WCEM-FM
    - WRDE-HD2 – satellite of WTDK
    - W282AW/W286BB – translators of WRDE-HD2
- Radio stations (Wilmington area)
  - WDEL – News/talk radio station
    - WDEL-FM – simulcast of WDEL
  - WSTW – Contemporary hit radio station
  - WXCY-FM – Country radio station
