= WMSG =

Coordinates: 39°23′32″N 79°23′54″W

- Oakland, Maryland; United States
- Broadcast area: Oakland, Maryland; Garrett County, Maryland
- Frequency: 1050 kHz
- Branding: Z95.9

Programming
- Format: Classic hits
- Affiliations: Westwood One News

Ownership
- Owner: Robert and Ashley Stevens; (Broadcast Communications, Inc.)
- Sister stations: WKHJ, WKTQ, WKTZ-FM

History
- First air date: May 19, 1963
- Call sign meaning: W Maryland State Garrett

Technical information
- Licensing authority: FCC
- Facility ID: 49935
- Class: D
- Power: 1,000 watts daytime 75 watts nighttime
- Translator: 95.1 W236DI (Oakland)

Links
- Public license information: Public file; LMS
- Website: WMSG Online

WMSG is a Classic Hits formatted broadcast radio station licensed to Oakland, Maryland, serving Oakland and Garrett County, Maryland. WMSG is owned and operated by Robert and Ashley Stevens through their licensee, Broadcast Communications, Inc.

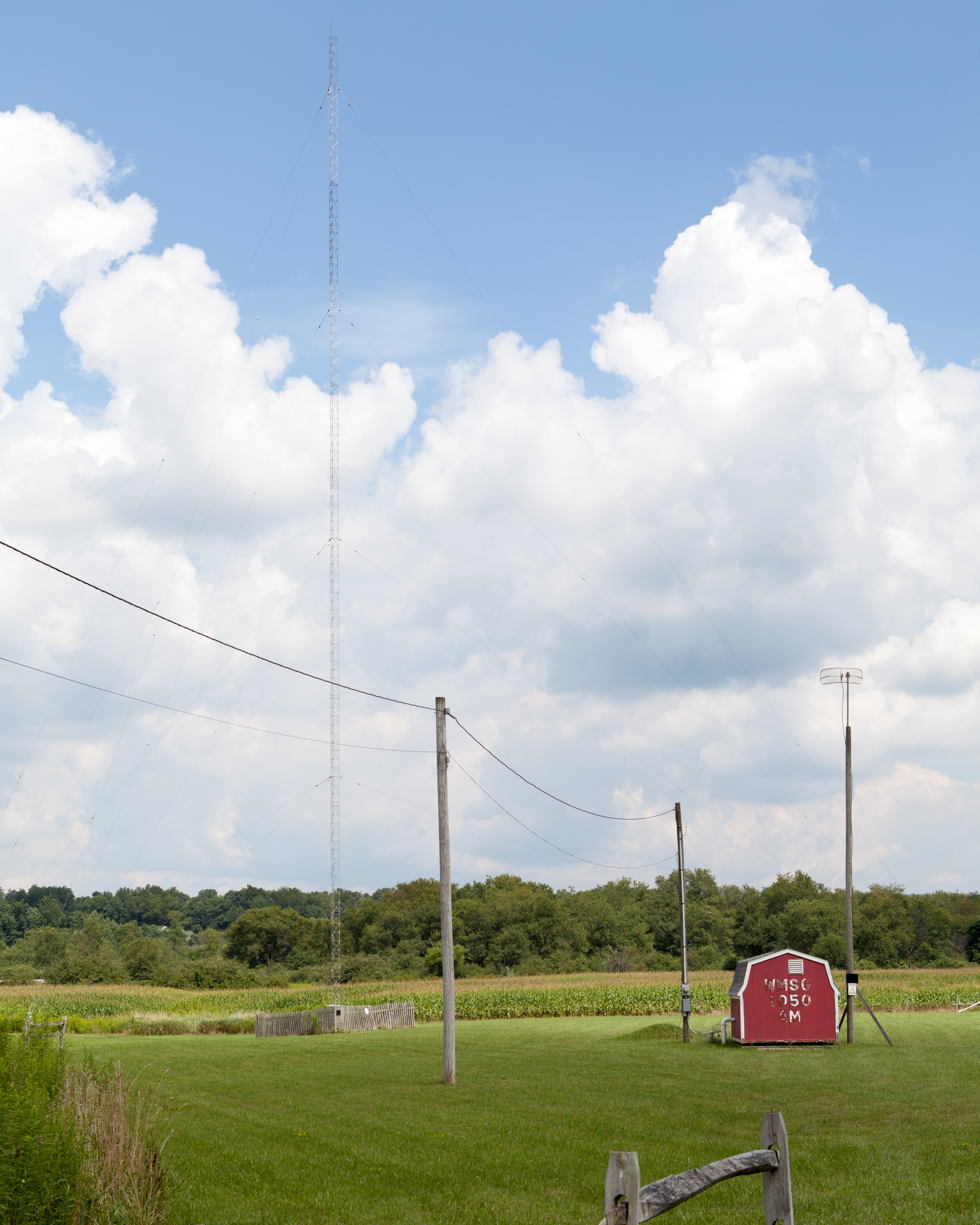
Transmitter and antenna in Oakland, Maryland

== History ==
=== Beginnings ===
WMSG first signed on the air on May 19, 1963, under the ownership of Oakland Radio Station Corporation, a company headed by C.W. Englander. Thomas Butscher served as the station's general manager and program director. The station initially operated at a daytime-only power of 500 watts, mainly playing country music.

In 1966, WMSG-FM signed on the air. The station was primarily a simulcast outlet of WMSG, to provide Oakland with local radio service after WMSG was mandated to shut down after sunset.

In 1985, WMSG was granted a construction permit to increase its power to 1,000 watts, but it would still operate only during the daytime. The upgrades were completed the following year. By the end of the decade, WMSG had been granted permission to operate at 75 watts nighttime power, and Kenneth Robertson had become president of Oakland Radio Station Corporation. By 1995, Brenda Butscher had become the company's president.

=== Sales and aftermath ===
After more than three decades of ownership, Oakland Radio Station Corporation decided to sell WMSG and its sister station on February 21, 1995, for $200,000 to Oakland Media Group. The sale became final on May 8, 1995. Al Devine was the new company president.

In July 2009, WMSG and sister stations WKHJ-FM and WWHC were sold for $830,000 to Pennsylvania-based Radiowerks Broadcasting.

=== WMSG today ===
In May 2011, WMSG and its sister stations were placed into receivership by Radiowerks Broadcasting, ordered by the Garrett County, Maryland Circuit Court. John Culp was appointed as receiver. The Federal Communications Commission approved the transfer of the license on May 19, 2011. The three stations were transferred to Broadcast Communications II, Inc., effective July 1, 2013, at a purchase price of $775,000.

== See also ==
- WMSG's Studios on Google StreetView
