= WCEM-FM =

Simulcasting WRDE-FM, Berlin
- Cambridge, Maryland; United States
- Frequency: 106.3 MHz
- Branding: Coast Country 103.9/106.3

Programming
- Format: Country
- Affiliations: Compass Media Networks; Premiere Networks

Ownership
- Owner: Draper Holdings Business Trust; (WBOC, Inc.)
- Sister stations: TV: WBOC-TV; WBOC-LD; WRDE-LD; WRUE-LD; WSJZ-LD; Radio: WAAI; WBOC-FM; WCEI-FM; WINX-FM; WRDE-FM; WTDK; WZBH

History
- First air date: January 29, 1968
- Former call signs: WCEM-FM (1968–1981); WESP-FM (1981–1983)
- Call sign meaning: Cambridge, Maryland

Technical information
- Licensing authority: FCC
- Facility ID: 46940
- Class: A
- ERP: 6,000 watts
- HAAT: 99 meters (325 ft)
- Transmitter coordinates: 38°29′1.8″N 76°11′20.3″W

Links
- Public license information: Public file; LMS
- Webcast: Listen live
- Website: www.coastcountry.com

WCEM-FM (106.3 MHz, "Coast Country 103.9/106.3") is a radio station playing a country music format. It broadcasts from Cambridge, Maryland. It is owned by the Draper Holdings Business Trust, as part of a cluster with CBS/Fox affiliate WBOC-TV (channel 16), NBC affiliate WRDE-LD (channel 31), Telemundo affiliate WBOC-LD (channel 42), and sister radio stations WBOC-FM, WTDK, WAAI and WRDE-FM. The station broadcasts from its studios in Cambridge Marketplace. WCEM-FM's transmitter is located in Cambridge.

In addition to its usual music programming, WCEM-FM broadcasts Baltimore Ravens games and little league baseball all-star games during the summer.

== History ==
The station was assigned the callsign WCEM-FM on January 29, 1968. On June 1, 1981, the station changed its call sign to WESP-FM. On November 1, 1983, the station's call sign reverted to WCEM-FM. It was the FM sister station of WCEM (1240 AM).

On March 4, 2022, WCEM-FM rebranded as "Coast Country 103.9/106.3", with a simulcast of WRDE-FM 103.9 from Berlin.
