= WHRF (Maryland) =

Radio station in Bel Air, Maryland, United States (1963–1994)

- Bel Air, Maryland; United States
- Frequency: 1520 kHz

Ownership
- Owner: New Harford Group, Inc.

History
- First air date: June 11, 1963; 62 years ago
- Last air date: 1994; 32 years ago
- Former call signs: WVOB (1963–1981)

Technical information
- Licensing authority: FCC
- Facility ID: 48442
- Power: 250 watts (daytime only)
- Transmitter coordinates: 39.5175°N 76.3639°W

Links
- Public license information: Public file; LMS

WHRF was a radio station on 1520 AM in Bel Air, Maryland, operating between 1963 and 1994.

== History ==
The Bel Air Broadcasting Company received the construction permit for a new radio station at 1520 kHz in Bel Air in February 1963. The station signed on air on June 11 of that year. Broadcasting with 250 watts during the day from a transmitter site along US Route 1 southwest of the city limits, WVOB carried a format of pop music and news for listeners in Harford County.

On June 11, 1971—the station's eighth anniversary—a construction worker grading adjacent land clipped the guy wires supporting WVOB's tower, causing it to collapse. That same year, the station clashed with Harford County officials over the availability of tape recordings of county meetings. Three years later, WVOB was fined over its repeated failure to comply with requirements for political editorials.

New WHRF call letters debuted on January 4, 1982, after James C. Swartz bought Bel Air Broadcasting; the station continued with its adult contemporary sound. It also filed in 1985 to relocate its transmitter site and operate at night with 1,000 watts; while this was approved in 1989, it was never implemented. The station was sold to the Harford County Broadcasting Company, controlled by James E. Fielder in 1988; a year later, Fielder sold the station for $320,000 to a consortium including a former federal assistant US secretary of labor. The new owners sought to increase WHRF's connection with the local community. The station soon became embroiled in financial difficulties; the first sign of trouble was when the station was sued for unpaid rent in November 1990. Harford County Broadcasting alleged that the terms of its lease were breached when the building was foreclosed upon. Meanwhile, former owner Fielder was sued by the Bank of Maryland for unpaid loans he guaranteed when he owned WHRF; he settled for $16,000. The station had gone silent by this time, with the New Harford Group acquiring it later in 1991 and returning it to the air with a news/talk format.

However, WHRF went dark again by late 1994, when New Harford filed to sell the station to CSN International, a satellite Christian broadcaster, for $75,000. The station's silence would result in the cancellation of its license in 1997.
