= WSMD-FM =

Coordinates: 38.414°N 76.775°W

- Mechanicsville, Maryland; United States
- Broadcast area: Southern Maryland; Northern Neck
- Frequency: 98.3 MHz
- Branding: Star 98.3

Programming
- Format: Contemporary hit radio

Ownership
- Owner: Somar Communications, Inc.
- Sister stations: WKIK; WMDM; WPTX

History
- First air date: 1988
- Former call signs: WQMR (1988–1991); WSMD (1991–1994)
- Call sign meaning: Southern Maryland

Technical information
- Licensing authority: FCC
- Facility ID: 60776
- Class: A
- ERP: 3,000 watts
- HAAT: 100 meters (330 ft)

Links
- Public license information: Public file; LMS
- Webcast: Listen live
- Website: www.star983.com

WSMD-FM is a contemporary hit radio formatted broadcast radio station licensed to Mechanicsville, Maryland, serving Southern Maryland and the Northern Neck. WSMD is owned and operated by Somar Communications, Inc.
