= WKTQ (FM) =

- Oakland, Maryland; United States
- Broadcast area: Oakland, Maryland; Kingwood, West Virginia
- Frequency: 92.3 MHz
- Branding: "92Q"

Programming
- Format: Country
- Affiliations: Westwood One News

Ownership
- Owner: Robert and Ashley Stevens; (Broadcast Communications, Inc.)
- Sister stations: WKHJ, WKTZ-FM, WMSG

History
- First air date: 1966
- Former call signs: WMSG-FM (1966–1978); WXIE (1978–1995); WWHC (1995–2013); WWHQ (2013–2016); WKTQ-FM (7/2016-8/2016)

Technical information
- Licensing authority: FCC
- Class: A
- Power: 1,400 Watts
- HAAT: 210 Meters
- Transmitter coordinates: 39°26′41.0″N 79°31′42.0″W

Links
- Public license information: Public file; LMS

WKTQ is a Country formatted broadcast radio station licensed to Oakland, Maryland.

Due to the high altitude of its tower, WKTQ's signal covers most of Garrett County, Maryland, most of neighboring Preston County, West Virginia, and parts of Tucker, Grant, and Mineral Counties in West Virginia. WKTQ is owned and operated by Robert and Ashley Stevens, through licensee Broadcast Communications, Inc.

== History ==
WKTQ began as a simulcast of sister station WMSG in 1966. WMSG split from the simulcast in 1978 and became WXIE. The first format on WXIE was a soft adult contemporary format. In 1991, WXIE moved from 92.1 to 92.3 and became "92X" and began running a classic hits format. WXIE went dark in 1994.

In 1995, the frequency was acquired by Oakland Media Group, changed its call sign to WWHC and began playing Country with the branding "Hot Country 92". Around 2000, 92.3 went through another name change, switching to "The Train" in reference to the railroad heritage that is found all over the region it serves.

On September 25, 2013, WWHC changed its call sign to WWHQ. On July 7, 2016, the station changed its call sign from WWHQ to WKTQ-FM; the "-FM" suffix was dropped on August 8, 2016.

== Studios/tower ==
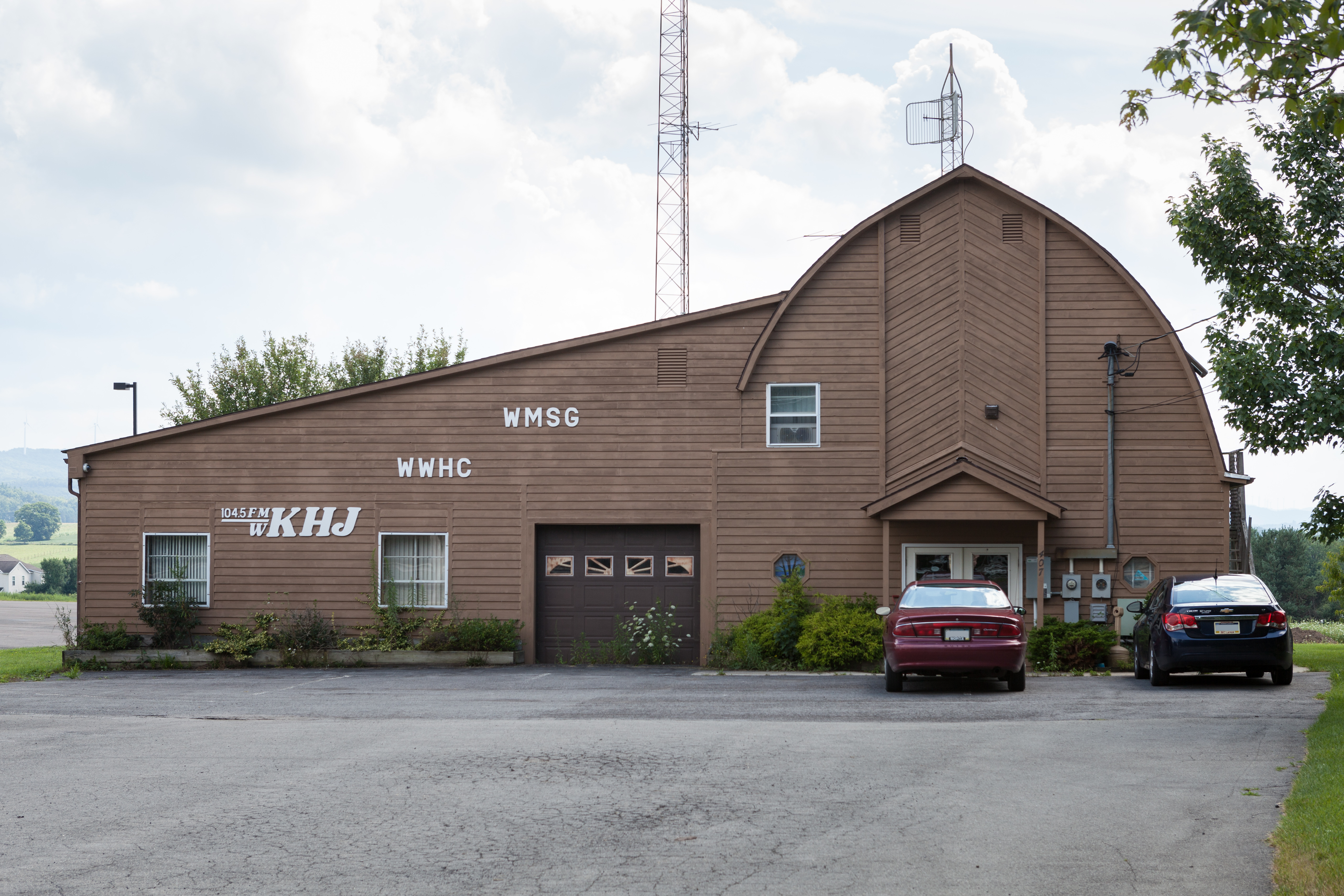
Studio in Loch Lynn Heights, Maryland

WKTQ's studios are on Lothian Street in Loch Lynn Heights, Maryland co-located with sister stations WMSG and WKHJ-FM and their tower is located above West Virginia Route 7 near Terra Alta, West Virginia.

== Station sold ==
In July 2009, then-WWHC and sisters WKHJ and WMSG were sold for $830,000 to Radiowerks Broadcasting.

In May 2011, WWHC and its sister stations were ordered into receivership by the Garrett County MD Circuit Court. John Culp was appointed as receiver. The Federal Communications Commission approved the transfer of the license on May 19, 2011.

The receivership sold WWHC and sister stations WKHJ and WMSG to Broadcast Communications II, Inc. The sale was effective July 1, 2013 at a purchase price of $775,000.

== See also ==
- WKTQ's Studios on Google StreetView
- WKTQ's Tower on Google StreetView
