= WESM =

- Princess Anne, Maryland; United States
- Broadcast area: Ocean City, Maryland, Salisbury, Maryland
- Frequency: 91.3 MHz
- Branding: WESM 91.3

Programming
- Format: Jazz, News/Information, Blues, World, Americana, Gospel
- Affiliations: National Public Radio, Public Radio Exchange, American Public Media

Ownership
- Owner: University of Maryland Eastern Shore
- Sister stations: WSCL, WSDL

History
- First air date: 1987
- Call sign meaning: W Eastern Shore Maryland

Technical information
- Licensing authority: FCC
- Class: B
- ERP: 45,000 watts
- HAAT: 91 meters
- Transmitter coordinates: 38°12′37″N 75°40′56″W

Links
- Public license information: Public file; LMS
- Webcast: listen now
- Website: www.delmarvapublicmedia.org

WESM (91.3 FM) is a listener-supported public radio station located on the Eastern Shore of Maryland. The station broadcasts a variety of formats, including jazz, news and information, blues, world, American folk music, and gospel programming. WESM is also an affiliate of National Public Radio, Public Radio Exchange, American Public Media and other network program providers.

Licensed to Princess Anne, Maryland, United States, the station is currently owned and operated by the University of Maryland Eastern Shore. WESM 91.3 FM began broadcasting in March 1987.

Broadcasting at approximately 50,000 watts, WESM's FM signal covers most of the lower Delmarva Peninsula, including the Eastern Shores of Maryland & Virginia, Sussex County, Delaware, and portions of Southern Maryland & Virginia's Northern Neck.

The station typically holds semi-annual membership drives in the spring and fall to help offset operational costs. These drives usually last less than ten days.

== See also ==
- List of jazz radio stations in the United States
