= WPTX =

Radio station in Lexington Park, Maryland

- Lexington Park, Maryland; United States
- Broadcast area: Southern Maryland; Northern Neck
- Frequency: 1690 kHz
- Branding: 100.7 FM and 1690 AM WPTX

Programming
- Language: English
- Format: Oldies
- Affiliations: Fox News Radio; Maryland Terrapins; The True Oldies Channel

Ownership
- Owner: Somar Communications, Inc.
- Sister stations: WKIK; WMDM; WSMD-FM

History
- First air date: February 4, 1953 (on 1570 kHz)
- Former call signs: WAZC (1998); WMDM (1998–2000)
- Call sign meaning: Patuxent

Technical information
- Licensing authority: FCC
- Facility ID: 87109
- Class: B
- Power: 10,000 watts (day); 1,000 watts (night)
- Transmitter coordinates: 38°16′58.45″N 76°33′37.84″W
- Translator: 100.7 W264DR (Lexington Park)

Links
- Public license information: Public file; LMS
- Webcast: Listen live
- Website: 1690wptx.com

WPTX (1690 kHz) is an AM radio oldies formatted broadcast radio station. The station is licensed to Lexington Park, Maryland and serves Southern Maryland and the Northern Neck of Virginia in the United States. WPTX is owned and operated by Somar Communications, Inc.

WPTX is Maryland's first and only AM expanded band radio station, having moved to the expanded band from 920 kHz on July 15, 1998. It operates with 10,000 watts daytime and reduces power to 1,000 at night to protect other stations on 1690 AM. Programming is also heard on 250-watt FM translator W264DR at 100.7 MHz in Lexington Park.

== History ==
WPTX originated as the expanded band "twin" of an existing station, with the same call sign, on the standard AM band.

The original WPTX was established by Patuxent Radio, Inc., owned by World War II pilot Jack Daugherty and businessman Paul Chapman, who obtained a construction permit on October 15, 1952, for the new station, initially operating daytime-only with 1,000 watts on 1570 kHz. Daugherty started WPTX in part because he felt Lexington Park needed its own civil institutions, having found resentment in his dealings in the county seat of Leonardtown. In 1953, St. Mary's County went from having no local station to having two, as WKIK (1370 AM) in Leonardtown signed on January 7, followed by WPTX on February 4.

In the early years of WPTX, Daugherty's 7-year-old son Tom was often let in by one of the disc jockeys to spin big band records on the station. In June, just four months after going on the air, Patuxent Radio applied to move WPTX to 920 kHz with 500 watts, remaining a daytime-only station; the Federal Communications Commission (FCC) approved the change in February 1954, making the move two months later and increasing its coverage area. Majority control changed hands four times in the next five years, ending when James S. Beattie became the sole owner of WPTX in 1959, and moved the station's studios to the Lexington Park, where they remained until 1968.

Key Broadcasting Corporation became the fifth owner of WPTX in six years when it purchased the station in 1960. Six years later, Key filed to upgrade the station to 5,000 watts and begin nighttime service with 1,000 watts; the FCC granted the application in February 1968, and the upgrade took effect in 1971. 1976, saw WPTX expand to the FM dial with the start-up of WMDM-FM 97.7; the AM station shifted to exclusively carrying a middle of the road format coinciding with the launch.

In 1988, Key Broadcasting sold WPTX and WMDM to Sconnix Broadcasting as part of a $25 million deal to purchase Key's Baltimore stations, WBMD and WQSR. Sconnix sold the Lexington Park outlets to Emmet Broadcasting for $1.2 million months later. After WKIK, a longtime country outlet, closed in 1992, WPTX flipped to country, WMDM-FM began simulcasting it the next year. Emmet sold the pair in 1996, when he sought to move near his family in Kentucky; Steve Garchik acquired both stations. WMDM-FM was split off again with separate programming later that year, and the AM station moved from country to talk.

=== Expanded Band assignment ===
On March 17, 1997, the FCC announced that 88 stations had been given permission to move to newly available "Expanded Band" transmitting frequencies, ranging from 1610 to 1700 kHz, with WPTX authorized to move from 920 to 1690 kHz.

A construction permit for the expanded band station was assigned the call letters WAZC on March 6, 1998, although this was changed to WMDM three weeks later. FCC policy mandated that both the original station and its expanded band counterpart could operate simultaneously for up to five years, after which owners would have to turn in one of the two licenses, depending on whether they preferred the new assignment or elected to remain on the original frequency. It was quickly decided to transfer full operations to the expanded band station, beginning on July 15, 1998, and on November 16, 1999, the license for the original WPTX on 920 AM was cancelled.

=== Later history ===
The call sign on 1690 AM was changed from WMDM to the historic WPTX on March 27, 2000. A year later, Roy Robertson, owner of WSMD-FM and WKIK-FM, bought WPTX and WMDM-FM. The talk programming was replaced with sports after the new acquisitions were off the air for 26 days.

Logo until translator sign on

== Translator ==
In addition to WPTX's primary frequency, the station's programming is simulcast on the following translator station, on the FM band, to widen WPTX's broadcast area.

Call sign	Frequency	City of license	FID	ERP (W)	HAAT	Class	Transmitter coordinates	FCC info
W264DR	(100.7 MHz) FM	Lexington Park, Maryland	202822	250 watts	114 m (374 ft)	D	38°16′56.0″N 76°33′35.0″W	LMS
