= WRDE-LD =

Television station in Salisbury, Maryland

- Salisbury, Maryland (Note: Originally licensed to Rehoboth Beach, Delaware; moved to Salisbury in 2019); United States
- Channels: Digital: 26 (UHF); Virtual: 31
- Branding: CoastTV; MyCozi TV (31.2)

Programming
- Affiliations: 31.1: NBC; 31.2: Cozi TV/MNTV; 42.2: Telemundo; for others, see § Subchannels

Ownership
- Owner: Draper Holdings Business Trust; (WBOC, Inc.)
- Sister stations: TV: WBOC-TV; WBOC-LD; Radio: WAAI; WBOC-FM; WCEI-FM; WCEM-FM; WGBG-FM; WINX-FM; WRDE-FM; WTDK; WZBH

History
- First air date: May 5, 2004
- Former call signs: W59DZ (2004–2005); WRDE-LP (2005–2009)
- Former channel numbers: Analog: 59 (UHF, 2004–2009); Digital: 31 (UHF, 2007–2019)
- Former affiliations: UATV (2004–2006); America One (2006–2007); MyNetworkTV (2007–2014, now on LD2); RTV (secondary, 2007–January 2014); Cozi TV (secondary, c. January–June 2014, now on LD2)
- Call sign meaning: Rehoboth Beach, Delaware (former city of license)

Technical information
- Licensing authority: FCC
- Facility ID: 168021
- Class: LD
- ERP: 15 kW
- HAAT: 248.5 m (815 ft)
- Transmitter coordinates: 38°30′18″N 75°38′36″W
- Translator(s): WRUE-LD 19 (UHF) Salisbury (Pocomoke City, MD); WSJZ-LD 34 (UHF) Salisbury (Long Neck, DE); WBOC-LD 22 (UHF) Cambridge (Laurel, DE)

Links
- Public license information: LMS
- Website: www.wrde.com

WRDE-LD (channel 31), branded as Coast TV, is a low-power television station in Salisbury, Maryland, United States, affiliated with NBC. It is owned by the Draper Holdings Business Trust alongside dual CBS and Fox affiliate WBOC-TV (channel 16), and low-power Cambridge-licensed Telemundo affiliate WBOC-LD (channel 42). WRDE-LD's news department is located on The Square in Milton, Delaware, though technical functions and most internal operations are based at WBOC-TV's studio on North Salisbury Boulevard in Salisbury. WRDE-LD's transmitter is located in Laurel, Delaware. WRDE-LD's programming is repeated on Salisbury-licensed WRUE-LD (channel 19), with transmitter near Pocomoke City, Maryland.

== History ==
The station first signed on the air as W59DZ on May 5, 2004; originally licensed to Rehoboth Beach, Delaware, and broadcasting on UHF channel 59, it operated at a low power, before upgrading its signal in 2005; that year, the station changed its call letters to WRDE-LP. Initially, the station ran a scroll with the callsign and city of license as a station identification, to meet the deadline for Federal Communications Commission (FCC) approval to keep the station's license. The station's original transmitter was located at the Nassau Valley Vineyards, directly off of DE 1 (Coastal Highway) by the Nassau Bridge. The station was originally an affiliate of Urban America Television; it changed its affiliation to America One after UATV ceased operations on May 1, 2006; WRDE-LP began airing programming from MyNetworkTV and the Retro Television Network on November 1, 2007. Then in early 2014, the RTN programming blocks were replaced with Cozi TV. The MyNetworkTV line-up shifted to 31.2 in June 2014 when NBC programming debuted on 31.1.

Originally, it planned to broadcast its digital signal from the Nassau Valley tower, but station officials decided instead to install its digital transmitter at a tower southwest of Lewes, that is also used by radio station WGMD (92.7 FM). (The station's over-the-air signal reaches as far north as Milford; as far east as Cape May, New Jersey; as far south as Ocean City, Maryland; and as far west as Seaford.) In October 2008, WRDE-LP was added on the digital cable tiers of local cable providers, including Comcast.

On April 23, 2014, it was announced that WRDE would become an NBC affiliate in June of that year. Station president Bob Backman approached NBC for an affiliation agreement after watching one of the out-of-market NBC affiliates on cable a few years earlier, dissatisfied at the lack of local news coverage focusing on the Delmarva region. The switch gave the Delmarva Peninsula market not only its first full-time NBC affiliate, but also its first major network affiliate based in Delaware (the market's other network affiliates originate from and are licensed to Salisbury, Maryland—including ABC affiliate WMDT and CBS/Fox affiliate WBOC-TV). The only Delaware-licensed station in the market was Seaford-licensed PBS member station WDPB, which operates as a satellite of Philadelphia's WHYY-TV.

Delmarva had been one of the few markets in the country that still lacked full service from the Big Three networks. With the affiliation switch, the station rebranded as "WRDE-NBC Coast TV", and moved the MyNetworkTV and Cozi TV affiliations to a new shared second digital subchannel. This brought NBC programming back to eastern Maryland and southern Delaware for the first time since WMDT dropped its secondary affiliation with NBC in 1992. For the 22 years that followed, cable and satellite systems had to rely on NBC's affiliates in Baltimore (WMAR-TV until January 1995, then WBAL-TV), Philadelphia (KYW-TV until September 1995, then network-owned WCAU), Hagerstown (WHAG-TV, now independent station WDVM-TV), and Norfolk (WAVY-TV) to carry the network's programming.

Throughout 2014, as WRDE began its affiliation with NBC, the station's cable coverage was expanded beyond Comcast to reach Mediacom, DirecTV and Dish Network customers in Sussex County, Delaware and Dorchester, Somerset, Wicomico and Worcester counties in Maryland. Most of the station's viewership comes via cable and satellite.

In October 2016, WRDE-LD was purchased by SagamoreHill Broadcasting from Price Hill Television.

On August 21, 2018, it was announced that WRDE would be sold to the Draper Holdings Business Trust, pending approval by the FCC; this would make WRDE a sister station to dual CBS/Fox affiliate WBOC-TV (channel 16). The sale was completed on January 1, 2019.

In the spring of 2019, a simulcast of WRDE began being broadcast on WBOC-LD on channel 31.3 and on WSJZ-LD on channel 31.4. Also in 2019, the station moved its license from Rehoboth Beach to Salisbury; it had been the only major-network station licensed on the Delaware side of the market. On December 31, 2019, WRDE-LD moved from its transmitter south of Lewes to a new tower located in Laurel. The station moved from digital UHF channel 31 to UHF channel 26, and a simulcast of WBOC-LD's Telemundo subchannel was added, broadcasting on channel 42.2.

On July 26, 2021, a simulcast of WBOC-LD's Antenna TV subchannel was added, broadcasting on 16.2. Starting in the fall of 2021, WRDE's programing began being repeated on its sister station WRUE-LD, a low-power transmitter located in Pocomoke City. In January 2022, the simulcast of WBOC-LD's Antenna TV subchannel was moved to 16.5.

On July 10, 2023, WRDE Coast TV unveiled its new brand identity as CoastTV.

== News operation ==
With the switch to NBC, WRDE launched a news department—consisting of half-hour evening newscasts at 6:00 and 11:00 pm.

In 2016, the station added a 5 p.m. newscast, WRDE News Live at 5, anchored by Anne Imanuel and Mark Edwards.

Prior to WBOC's acquisition, the station's newscasts were anchored by staff in Little Rock, Arkansas at the studios of the Independent News Network. From Spring 2019 to Fall 2019, WRDE simulcast WBOC's 6 and 11 p.m. newscasts while a new news operation was built.

On October 30, 2019, WRDE launched its newscasts anchored from studios in Milton, Delaware and directed from WBOC's facilities in Salisbury, Maryland. In the fall of 2021, newscasts on WRDE were expanded to morning and mid-day. Currently, the news airs at 5, 6 and 11 a.m. and 5, 6 and 11 p.m. on weekdays, and 6 and 11 p.m. on weekends.

== Technical information ==
=== Subchannels ===
The station's signal is multiplexed:

Subchannels of WRDE-LD
Subchannel	Res.	Short name	Programming
31.1	1080i	WRDE	NBC
31.2	480i	COZI	Cozi TV / MyNetworkTV
16.5	480i	WBOC-CL	Antenna TV
42.2	1080i	TELEMUN	Telemundo (WBOC-LD)

Simulcast of subchannels of another station

WRDE-LD is also rebroadcast as channel 31.3 from WBOC-LD, which is co-sited with WRUE-LD at the Laurel tower, and 31.4 from WSJZ-LD, which broadcasts from a tower at Millsboro, Delaware.

Channels broadcast by the Draper LPTV stations
Station	WRDE-LD	WRUE-LD	WBOC-LD	WSJZ-LD
Transmitter site	Laurel	Pocomoke City	Laurel	Millsboro
CoastTV (NBC)	31.1	31.1	31.3	31.4
Telemundo Delmarva	42.2	42.2	42.1	42.3
MyCozi TV	31.2	31.2		
WBOC Classics	16.5	16.5	16.3	16.4

== See also ==
- Channel 9 branded TV stations in the United States
- Channel 31 low-power TV stations in the United States
- Channel 31 virtual TV stations in the United States
