= WTDK =

- Federalsburg, Maryland; United States
- Broadcast area: Easton, Maryland
- Frequency: 107.1 MHz
- Branding: 107.1 The Duck

Programming
- Format: Classic hits

Ownership
- Owner: Draper Holdings Business Trust; (WBOC, Inc.)
- Sister stations: TV: WBOC-TV; WBOC-LD; WRDE-LD; WRUE-LD; WSJZ-LD; Radio: WAAI; WBOC-FM; WCEI-FM; WCEM-FM; WINX-FM; WRDE-FM; WZBH

History
- First air date: December 2, 1978 (as WCTD)
- Former call signs: WCTD (1978–1989); WDLE-FM (1989–1991); WQMR (1991–1993); WWPL (1993–1995)
- Call sign meaning: The Duck

Technical information
- Licensing authority: FCC
- Facility ID: 51149
- Class: A
- ERP: 3,900 watts
- HAAT: 124 meters (407 ft)
- Translators: 104.3 W282AW (Salisbury); 105.1 W286BB (Ocean Pines)
- Repeater: 103.9 WRDE-FM HD2 (Berlin)

Links
- Public license information: Public file; LMS
- Webcast: Listen live
- Website: www.1071theduck.com

WTDK (107.1 FM, "The Duck") is a radio station licensed to serve Federalsburg, Maryland. The station is owned by the Draper Holdings Business Trust, as part of a cluster with CBS/Fox affiliate WBOC-TV (channel 16), NBC affiliate WRDE-LD (channel 31), Telemundo affiliate WBOC-LD (channel 42), and sister radio stations WCEM-FM, WBOC-FM, WAAI, and WRDE-FM. It airs a classic hits music format.

The station was assigned the WTDK call letters by the Federal Communications Commission on July 31, 1995.
