= WBOC-LD =

Television station in Cambridge, Maryland

- Cambridge–Salisbury, Maryland; United States
- City: Cambridge, Maryland (Note: Originally licensed to Georgetown, Delaware; moved to Cambridge in 2020.)
- Channels: Digital: 22 (UHF); Virtual: 42
- Branding: Telemundo Delmarva; Telemundo 42; Noticias WBOC en Telemundo Delmarva (news)

Programming
- Affiliations: 42.1: Telemundo; 31.3: NBC; 16.3: Antenna TV

Ownership
- Owner: Draper Holdings Business Trust; (WBOC, Inc.)
- Sister stations: TV: WBOC-TV; WRDE-LD; Radio: WAAI; WBOC-FM; WCEI-FM; WCEM-FM; WGBG-FM; WINX-FM; WRDE-FM; WTDK; WZBH

History
- Founded: December 15, 2011
- First air date: October 2, 2017
- Former call signs: W42EI-D (2011−2017)
- Call sign meaning: We're Between the Ocean and the Chesapeake

Technical information
- Facility ID: 187976
- Class: LD
- ERP: 15 kW
- HAAT: 248.5 m (815 ft)
- Transmitter coordinates: 38°30′18″N 75°38′36″W

Links
- Website: www.telemundodelmarva.com

WBOC-LD (channel 42) is a low-power television station licensed to Cambridge, Maryland, United States, serving the Salisbury, Maryland, market as an affiliate of the Spanish-language network Telemundo. It is owned by the Draper Holdings Business Trust alongside dual CBS/Fox affiliate WBOC-TV (channel 16) and low-power NBC affiliate WRDE-LD (channel 31), as well as eight radio stations. Telemundo Delmarva shares studios with sister station WRDE-LD in Milton, Delaware, and WBOC-LD's transmitter is located near Laurel. WBOC-LD's programming is repeated on Salisbury-licensed WSJZ-LD (channel 34), with transmitter near Millsboro, Delaware.

== History ==
On October 20, 2017, WBOC launched a new channel to be the area's Telemundo affiliate. In November 2017, WBOC-LD secured carriage on Delmarva area cable systems including Comcast Xfinity in Delaware and Maryland and Verizon Fios in Delaware. Also in November, a standard definition simulcast of WBOC-LD started being broadcast on WBOC-TV on channel 42.2. That simulcast ended on August 13, 2018.

In February 2018, the station began producing local news and weather updates in Spanish airing multiple times a day. The newscasts utilize the studio, graphics, music and talent of sister station WBOC-TV. Beginning in April 2019, a simulcast of WBOC-LD started being broadcast on WSJZ-LD on channel 42.3; that facility had been acquired by Draper in 2017. In May 2019, a simulcast of WRDE-LD began being broadcast on a new subchannel. In December 2019, a simulcast of WBOC-LD's Telemundo subchannel started being broadcast on WRDE-LD.

The station moved its license from Georgetown, Delaware, to Cambridge, Maryland, in 2020. In 2021, WBOC-LD moved from digital UHF channel 42 to UHF channel 22. On July 26, 2021, WBOC-TV's Antenna TV subchannel was moved to WBOC-LD and began broadcasting on channel 16.3.

== Technical information ==
=== Subchannels ===
The station's signal is multiplexed:

Subchannels of WBOC-LD
Channel	Res.	Short name	Programming
42.1	1080i	Telemun	Telemundo
31.3	1080i	WRDE-LD	NBC
16.3	480i	WBOC-CL	Antenna TV

Simulcast of subchannels of another station

The same channels are broadcast on WSJZ-LD, but with different minor channel numbers: 42.2, 31.4, and 16.4.

Telemundo Delmarva is also rebroadcast as channel 42.2 from WRDE-LD, which is co-sited with WBOC-LD at the Laurel tower, and WRUE-LD, broadcasting from a site northwest of Pocomoke City. WBOC Classics is broadcast as channel 16.5 from the former but not the latter.

Channels broadcast by the Draper LPTV stations
Station	WRDE-LD	WRUE-LD	WBOC-LD	WSJZ-LD
Transmitter site	Laurel	Pocomoke City	Laurel	Millsboro
CoastTV (NBC)	31.1	31.1	31.3	31.4
Telemundo Delmarva	42.2	42.2	42.1	42.3
MyCozi TV	31.2	31.2		
WBOC Classics	16.5	16.5	16.3	16.4
