= WAAI =

- Hurlock, Maryland; United States
- Broadcast area: Cambridge, Maryland
- Frequency: 100.9 MHz
- Branding: 100.9 WAAI

Programming
- Format: Classic country

Ownership
- Owner: Draper Holdings Business Trust; (WBOC, Inc.)
- Sister stations: Radio: WBOC-FM; WCEI-FM; WCEM-FM; WGBG-FM; WINX-FM; WTDK; WZBH; TV: WBOC-TV; WBOC-LD; WRDE-LD; WSJZ-LD; WRUE-LD

History
- Call sign meaning: Apex Associates Inc. (original owners)

Technical information
- Licensing authority: FCC
- Facility ID: 2417
- Class: A
- ERP: 1,300 watts
- HAAT: 153.0 meters

Links
- Public license information: Public file; LMS
- Webcast: Listen live
- Website: www.1009classiccountry.com

WAAI (100.9 FM) is a radio station broadcasting a classic country music format. Its tower is in Hurlock, Maryland, but broadcasts emanate from its studios in Cambridge, Maryland. It is owned by the Draper Holdings Business Trust, as part of a cluster with CBS/Fox affiliate WBOC-TV (channel 16), NBC affiliate WRDE-LD (channel 31), Telemundo affiliate WBOC-LD (channel 42), and sister radio stations WCEM-FM, WBOC-FM, and WTDK.
