= WKIK (FM) =

Coordinates: 38.368°N 76.615°W

- California, Maryland; United States
- Broadcast area: Southern Maryland; Northern Neck
- Frequency: 102.9 MHz
- Branding: Country 102.9 WKIK

Programming
- Format: Country
- Affiliations: Fox News Radio; Westwood One

Ownership
- Owner: Somar Communications, Inc.
- Sister stations: WMDM; WPTX; WSMD-FM

History
- First air date: December 1994
- Former call signs: WBEY (1991–1994); WRFK (1994–1997); WKIK-FM (1997–2023)
- Call sign meaning: "kick"

Technical information
- Licensing authority: FCC
- Facility ID: 60777
- Class: A
- ERP: 4,000 watts
- HAAT: 120 meters (390 ft)

Links
- Public license information: Public file; LMS
- Webcast: Listen live
- Website: www.country1029wkik.com

WKIK (102.9 MHz) is a country formatted broadcast radio station licensed to California, Maryland, serving Southern Maryland and the Northern Neck. WKIK is owned and operated by Somar Communications, Inc.

== History ==
Tidewater Communications, controlled by Richard A. Myers, was granted a construction permit for a radio station on 102.9 MHz in California, Maryland, on May 23, 1991; the permit was soon issued the call sign WBEY. In 1993, Tidewater sold the permit to Somar Communications, owner of WMOM and WSMD, for $130,000. Somar signed the station on in December 1994 as country music station WRFK.

The station's call sign was changed to WKIK-FM on January 1, 1997. The "-FM" suffix was dropped on April 4, 2023; this followed the shutdown earlier in the year of WKIK (1560 AM), the former WMOM, which had simulcast WKIK-FM since 2000.
