= Loch Lynn Heights, Maryland =

- Town
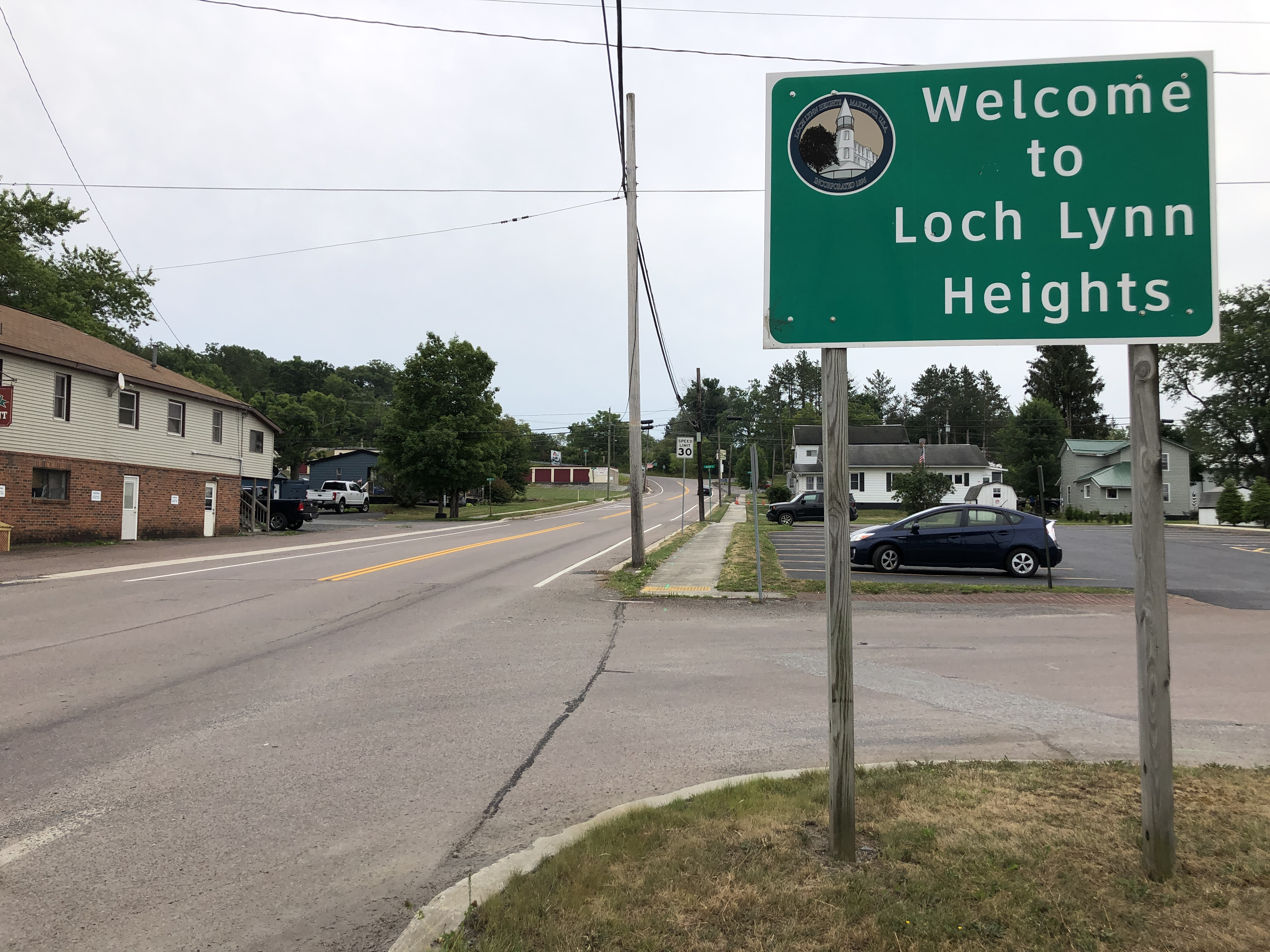
- Entering Loch Lynn Heights on MD 560

- Seal

- Location of Loch Lynn Heights, Maryland
- Coordinates: 39°23′30″N 79°22′28″W
- Country: United States
- State: Maryland
- County: Garrett
- Incorporated: 1896

Area
  - Total: 0.32 sq mi (0.82 km^{2})
  - Land: 0.32 sq mi (0.82 km^{2})
  - Water: 0 sq mi (0.00 km^{2})
- Elevation: 2,464 ft (751 m)

Population (2020)
  - Total: 493
  - Density: 1,550/sq mi (598.4/km^{2})
- Time zone: UTC-5 (Eastern (EST))
  - Summer (DST): UTC-4 (EDT)
- ZIP code: 21550
- Area codes: 301, 240
- FIPS code: 24-47525
- GNIS feature ID: 2391272
- Website: https://www.lochlynnhgts.gov/

Loch Lynn Heights is a town in Garrett County, Maryland, United States. The population was 493 at the 2020 census.

== Geography ==
According to the United States Census Bureau, the town has a total area of 0.32 square miles (0.83 km^{2}), all land.

== 1967 F3 tornado ==
On May 19, 1967, a tornado struck Loch Lynn Heights, causing one fatality and throwing a small frame house 100 yards. It was rated F3.

== Demographics ==
Historical population
Census	Pop.	Note	%±
1900	215		—
1910	216		0.5%
1920	224		3.7%
1930	198		−11.6%
1940	339		71.2%
1950	415		22.4%
1960	476		14.7%
1970	507		6.5%
1980	503		−0.8%
1990	461		−8.3%
2000	469		1.7%
2010	552		17.7%
2020	493		−10.7%
U.S. Decennial Census

=== 2010 census ===
As of the census of 2010, there were 552 people, 203 households, and 157 families living in the town. The population density was 1,725.0 inhabitants per square mile (666.0/km^{2}). There were 228 housing units at an average density of 712.5 per square mile (275.1/km^{2}). The racial makeup of the town was 98.7% White, 0.2% African American, 0.2% from other races, and 0.9% from two or more races. Hispanic or Latino of any race were 0.4% of the population.

There were 203 households, of which 44.3% had children under the age of 18 living with them, 46.8% were married couples living together, 23.6% had a female householder with no husband present, 6.9% had a male householder with no wife present, and 22.7% were non-families. 19.2% of all households were made up of individuals, and 10.9% had someone living alone who was 65 years of age or older. The average household size was 2.72, and the average family size was 3.06.

The median age in the town was 32.8 years. 30.8% of residents were under the age of 18; 9.2% were between the ages of 18 and 24; 24.7% were from 25 to 44; 23.2% were from 45 to 64; and 12% were 65 years of age or older. The gender makeup of the town was 46.4% male and 53.6% female.

=== 2000 census ===
As of the census of 2000, there were 469 people, 181 households, and 135 families living in the town. The population density was 1,485.0 inhabitants per square mile (573.4/km^{2}). There were 202 housing units at an average density of 639.6 per square mile (247.0/km^{2}). The racial makeup of the town was 99.36% White, 0.43% Asian, and 0.21% from two or more races.

There were 181 households, out of which 36.5% had children under the age of 18 living with them, 59.1% were married couples living together, 11.6% had a female householder with no husband present, and 25.4% were non-families. 21.5% of all households were made up of individuals, and 9.9% had someone living alone who was 65 years of age or older. The average household size was 2.59, and the average family size was 3.00.

In the town, the population was spread out, with 28.6% under the age of 18, 7.7% from 18 to 24, 27.5% from 25 to 44, 22.0% from 45 to 64, and 14.3% who were 65 years of age or older. The median age was 36 years. For every 100 females, there were 93.0 males. For every 100 females age 18 and over, there were 81.1 males.

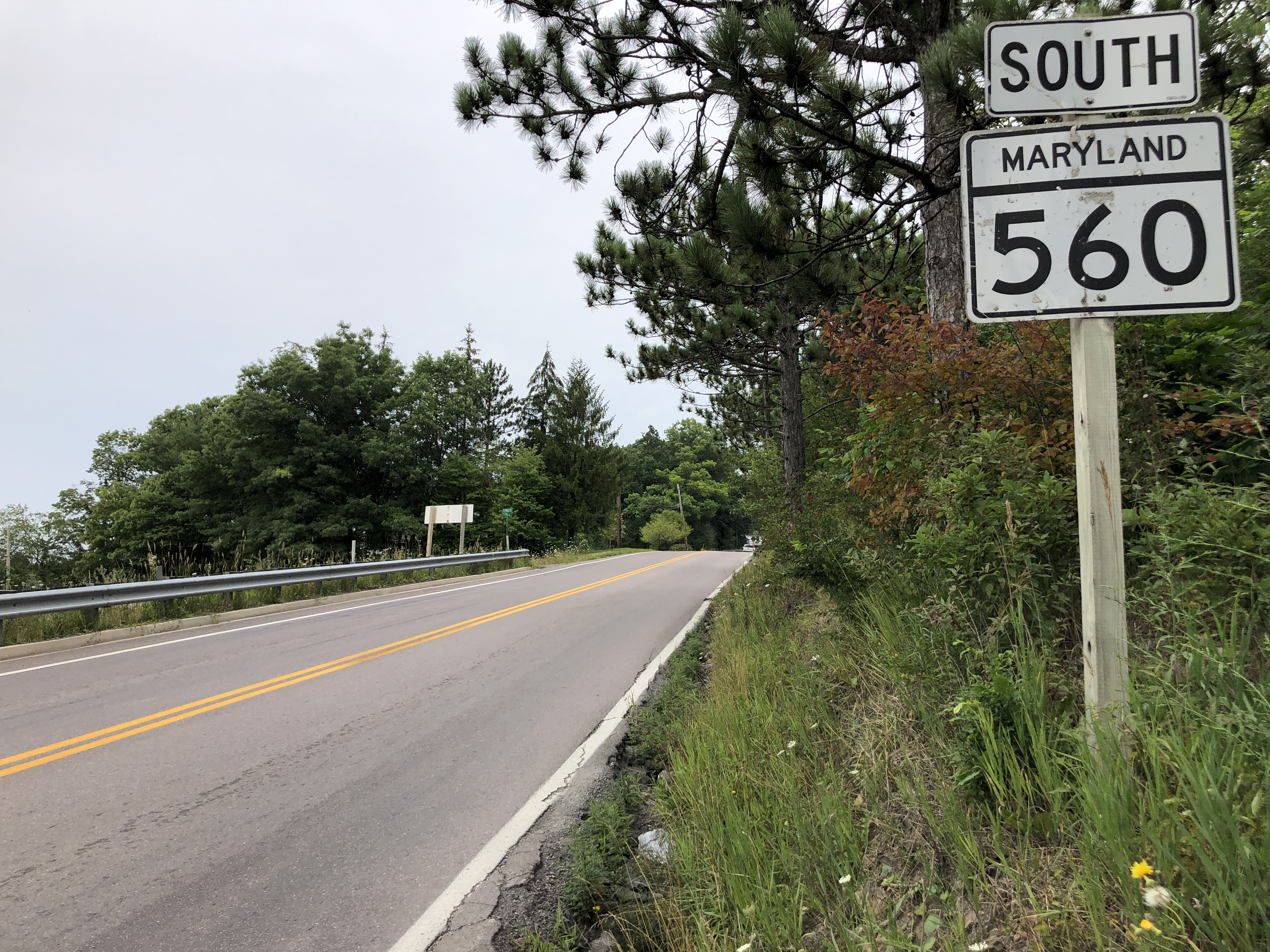
MD 560 southbound in Loch Lynn Heights

The median household income in the town was $31,875, and the median family income was $34,375. Males had a median income of $21,563 versus $16,111 for females. The per capita income for the town was $12,369. About 14.7% of families and 16.2% of the population were below the poverty line, including 24.8% of those under age 18 and 11.2% of those age 65 or over.

== Transportation ==
The primary mode of transportation to and from Loch Lynn Heights is currently by road. The only state highway directly serving the town is Maryland Route 560, which heads south to U.S. Route 50 in Gorman and north to Maryland Route 135 in Mountain Lake Park.
