= WMDM =

Coordinates: 38.283°N 76.561°W

- Lexington Park, Maryland; United States
- Broadcast area: Southern Maryland; Northern Neck
- Frequency: 97.7 MHz
- Branding: 97.7 The Bay

Programming
- Format: Classic hits

Ownership
- Owner: Somar Communications, Inc.
- Sister stations: WKIK, WPTX, WSMD

History
- First air date: 1976
- Former call signs: WMDM-FM (1976–2006); WYRX (2006–2007); WRKZ (2007–2008); WYRX (2008–2009)

Technical information
- Licensing authority: FCC
- Facility ID: 61314
- Class: A
- ERP: 6,000 watts
- HAAT: 100 meters (330 ft)

Links
- Public license information: Public file; LMS
- Webcast: Listen Live
- Website: 977thebay.com

WMDM is a classic hits formatted broadcast radio station licensed to Lexington Park, Maryland, serving Southern Maryland and the Northern Neck. WMDM is owned and operated by Somar Communications, Inc.

== History ==
WMDM originally aired an adult contemporary/top 40 mixed format in the 1980s as All Hit 98 WMDM.

WMDM aired an oldies music format from the 1990s until May 31, 2006.

On May 31, 2006, the station switched their callsign from WMDM-FM to WYRX and their format to modern rock under the branding "The Rocket".

On September 17, 2007, WYRX changed their call sign to WRKZ. The WRKZ calls had been attached to a Pittsburgh rock station until April 2007. The format had evolved into an active rock music format with the addition of artists like Aerosmith, Def Leppard, and Led Zeppelin to the playlist.

On January 22, 2008, WRKZ changed their call letters back to WYRX. Joe Sanchez was the Morning Show host and Program Director until February 2009.

On March 4, 2009, WYRX switched its call sign back to WMDM. On March 21, 2009, WMDM dropped its active rock format and return to its former adult contemporary and picked up the branding "Magic 97.7".

On April 21, 2009, WMDM brought back "The Rocket" branding and switched its format back to contemporary hit radio.

On November 30, 2009, WMDM switched formats to easy listening, branded as "Easy 97-7". The new format consists mainly of vocals (as opposed to the original instrumental-oriented beautiful music format).

On March 11, 2011, WMDM again changed their format to classic rock and again re-branded themselves as "97-7 The Rocket".

On the afternoon of April 18, 2017, WMDM changed their format to active rock, and continues to brand itself as "97-7 the Rocket". Disc Jockey "Blak Jak" announced the change on his 3 p.m. to 7 p.m. program.

The format and name changed in 2018. The station now plays "classic hits" and is now branded as "97-7 The Bay".
