= WBOC-FM =

- Princess Anne, Maryland; United States
- Broadcast area: Delmarva
- Frequency: 102.5 MHz
- Branding: 102.5 WBOC

Programming
- Format: Top 40 (CHR)

Ownership
- Owner: Draper Holdings Business Trust; (WBOC, Inc.)
- Sister stations: TV: WBOC-TV; WBOC-LD; WRDE-LD; WRUE-LD; WSJZ-LD; Radio: WAAI; WCEI-FM; WCEM-FM; WGBG-FM; WINX-FM; WRDE-FM; WTDK; WZBH

History
- First air date: December 24, 1976 (as WOLC)
- Former call signs: WOLC (1976–2015)
- Call sign meaning: We're Between the Ocean and the Chesapeake

Technical information
- Licensing authority: FCC
- Facility ID: 39894
- Class: B
- ERP: 50,000 watts
- HAAT: 144 meters (472 ft)
- Transmitter coordinates: 38°6′47″N 75°39′15″W

Links
- Public license information: Public file; LMS
- Webcast: Listen live
- Website: wboc1025.com

WBOC-FM (102.5 MHz) is a radio station that broadcasts a Top 40/CHR format. Licensed to Princess Anne, Maryland, United States, the station is owned by the Draper Holdings Business Trust, as part of a cluster with CBS/Fox affiliate WBOC-TV (channel 16), NBC affiliate WRDE-LD (channel 31), Telemundo affiliate WBOC-LD (channel 42), and sister radio stations WCEM-FM, WTDK, WAAI, WRDE-FM, WCEI-FM, and WINX-FM.

== History ==
The station went on the air December 24, 1976, as WOLC, a religious station owned by Maranatha, Inc. (not to be confused with the unrelated Maranatha Broadcasting Company, the owners of WFMZ-TV in Allentown, Pennsylvania). In August 2015, Maranatha agreed to sell WOLC to Draper Holdings Business Trust, owner of WBOC-TV, and took the station off the air on August 18. Draper moved WOLC's studios from Princess Anne to the Salisbury studios of WBOC-TV, using the space formerly occupied by the former WBOC radio (now WTGM and WQHQ); it also announced that the station would introduce a format that, while not yet chosen, would include news, weather, and sports content from WBOC-TV. Draper also filed to change the station's call letters to WBOC-FM.

The sale was completed on November 10, 2015, at a purchase price of $650,000; the change to WBOC-FM took effect at that time. The station returned to the air on November 20, and aired Christmas music without commercials through the holiday season. WBOC-FM launched its eventual adult contemporary format on December 31, 2015.

WBOC-FM started leaning towards Top 40/CHR in March 2022 and rebranded as "Delmarva's Hit Music Station" to fill a CHR hole in the market when WOCQ flipped to country that month. Although WKZP also airs a similar format in Salisbury, the transmitter reach is not as wide as WOCQ.
