= WBOC-TV =

Television station in Salisbury, Maryland

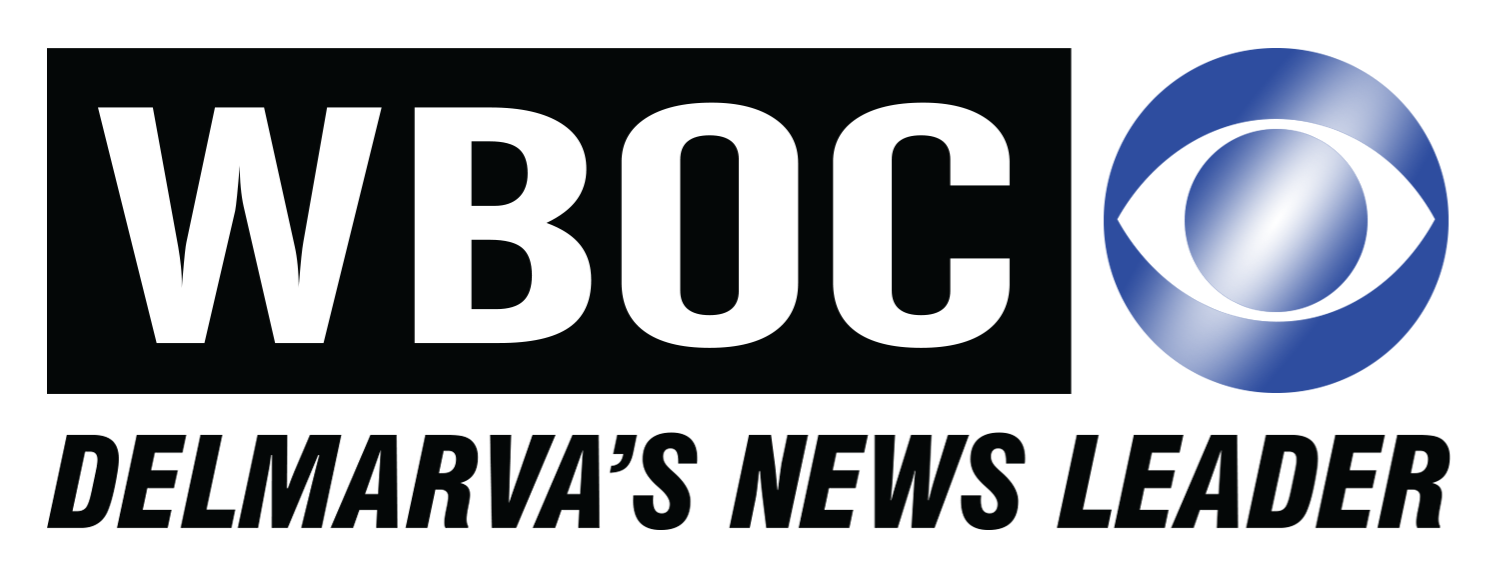

- Salisbury, Maryland; Dover, Delaware; United States
- City: Salisbury, Maryland
- Channels: Digital: 32 (UHF); Virtual: 16
- Branding: WBOC; Delmarva Sports Network (16.2); Fox 21 Delmarva (21.2)

Programming
- Affiliations: 16.1: CBS; 16.2: DSN; 21.2: Fox

Ownership
- Owner: Draper Holdings Business Trust; (WBOC, Inc.)
- Sister stations: TV: WBOC-LD; WRDE-LD; WRUE-LD; WSJZ-LD; Radio: WAAI; WBOC-FM; WCEI-FM; WCEM-FM; WGBG-FM; WINX-FM; WRDE-FM; WTDK; WZBH

History
- First air date: July 15, 1954
- Former channel numbers: Analog: 16 (UHF, 1954–2009); Digital: 21 (UHF, 1999–2019)
- Former affiliations: DuMont (primary 1954–1955, secondary 1955–1956); ABC and NBC (secondary, c. 1955–1980); UPN (21.2, 2003–2006)
- Call sign meaning: We're Between the Ocean and the Chesapeake

Technical information
- Licensing authority: FCC
- Facility ID: 71218
- ERP: 1,000 kW
- HAAT: 284.1 m (932 ft)
- Transmitter coordinates: 38°30′17″N 75°38′36″W

Links
- Public license information: Public file; LMS
- Website: www.wboc.com; www.fox21delmarva.com (DT2)

WBOC-TV (channel 16) is a television station in Salisbury, Maryland, United States, affiliated with CBS and Fox. It is the flagship television property of the Milton, Delaware–based Draper Holdings Business Trust, and shares common ownership with low-power NBC affiliate WRDE-LD (channel 26) and Telemundo affiliate WBOC-LD (channel 22), as well as eight radio stations. The station's studios are located on North Salisbury Boulevard in Salisbury; WBOC-TV maintains secondary studios/office facilities in Dover, Delaware, and transmitter facilities in Laurel, Delaware.

== History ==
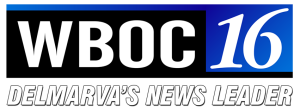
Former WBOC-TV logo from 2004 to 2020.

WBOC-TV began operations on July 15, 1954, owned originally by Peninsula Broadcasting, which started WBOC radio (960 AM, now WTGM; and 104.7 FM, now WQHQ), the first successful radio station on the Eastern Shore, in 1940. It is the fourth-oldest television station in Maryland, the first outside Baltimore, and the oldest in Maryland on the UHF band.

It was originally an affiliate of the DuMont Television Network. However, around 1955, it picked up a primary affiliation with CBS, relegating DuMont to secondary status until that network shut down in 1956. It also picked up secondary affiliations with NBC and ABC. The station also featured local programming consisting of variety shows, talent contests, and children's programs.

In 1961, Peninsula Broadcasting was acquired by the A. S. Abell Company, which published the Baltimore Sun and owned Baltimore's then-CBS affiliate, WMAR-TV. WBOC-TV gradually increased the CBS programming on its schedule, though it continued to "cherry-pick" the highest-rated ABC and NBC shows either in pattern (on schedule with the rest of the network) or on a tape-delayed basis.

For example, channel 16 regularly carried the Today Show and The Tonight Show from NBC, and weekend sports coverage from all three networks. Prime time programming consisted of at least one night of all CBS; other evenings with programs from both CBS and ABC; and others with shows from CBS and NBC. Select CBS programs displaced by the scheduling method would air in times outside of prime time. Despite carrying Today (which preempted CBS's numerous attempts at morning news programming and Captain Kangaroo), WBOC-TV aired all of CBS's other newscasts, as well as most of CBS's daytime programming and Saturday morning cartoons. The cherry-picking arrangement also affected prime time network sports coverage. However, Delmarva viewers did not have to worry about missing their favorite shows once cable came to the area. Local cable systems on the Maryland side of the market supplemented the area with the Baltimore stations, while cable systems in Sussex County, Delaware, supplemented it with the Philadelphia stations.

WBOC primarily serves the four southernmost counties of the Eastern Shore, as well as Sussex County. This relatively small market has roughly 209,000 people. However, channel 16's claimed primary coverage area includes portions of three neighboring markets. Kent County, Delaware, home to the capital city of Dover, is part of the Philadelphia market. However, WBOC-TV has been available for decades on cable in Dover, though presently only in digital. Not only does WBOC-TV operate a bureau there, but for many years it identified as "Salisbury–Dover". Accomack County, Virginia, is part of the Hampton Roads market, and is primarily served by county-owned translators of the Hampton Roads stations. WBOC-TV has long been available on cable in Accomack County, alongside the Hampton Roads stations. The station also covers the five Eastern Shore counties that are part of the Baltimore market.

In April 1980, WBOC-TV received competition for the first time when WMDT (channel 47) signed on as a dual ABC/NBC affiliate, allowing channel 16 to become a full-time CBS station. In November of that same year, local ownership of channel 16 returned when entrepreneur Thomas H. Draper purchased the station. Since Draper took over, local news coverage increased, as well as local advertising revenue which allowed for technical upgrades, such as a new four-million-watt tower located near Laurel. WBOC-TV regained a sister radio station in 2015, when Draper acquired WOLC (102.5 FM) in Princess Anne and relaunched it as WBOC-FM (the original WBOC radio stations had been sold to separate interests in 1980).

=== DT2 subchannel ===
On March 3, 2003, WBOC launched a subchannel to be the area's UPN affiliate, known on-air as "UPN21 Total TV". Before then, either the network's Baltimore affiliates (first WNUV, and later WUTB) or WDCA in Washington, D.C., had been provided on cable systems on the Maryland side of the market, while WPSG in Philadelphia had served the Delaware side, and WGNT in Portsmouth on the Virginia side.

On May 9, 2006, WBOC announced that the subchannel would become a Fox affiliate beginning August 21; UPN was in the process of shutting down as part of a merger with The WB to form The CW, but the Delmarva rights to the new network went to a subchannel of WMDT. For Fox's first 20 years of existence, either WBFF in Baltimore or network-owned WTTG in Washington, D.C. had served as the network's default affiliates for the Maryland side of the market, while affiliate-turned-O&O WTXF-TV in Philadelphia served the Delaware side, and the network's Hampton Roads affiliates were carried on the Virginia side (WTVZ-TV until August 1998, then WVBT).

== Newscasts ==
WBOC operates a bureau in Milton, Delaware, in addition to its main studios in Salisbury. All news broadcasts can be seen via live streaming video on WBOC's Facebook page and mobile app.

When WBOC-DT2 became a Fox affiliate, the main channel began producing local news weeknights at 5 for a half-hour (known as WBOC News at 5 on Fox 21) and every night at 10 also for thirty minutes (called WBOC News at 10 on Fox 21). Both shows air from a secondary set and feature a separate graphics package. Weekday mornings at 6, this station simulcasts the second hour of the main channel's weekday morning show.

On August 26, 2008, WBOC began airing its local newscasts in high definition from a newly constructed addition to its studios known as the "NewsPlex". In addition to the main facilities in Salisbury, the station operates Delaware bureaus in Dover (in the Rodney Village section on US 13/South Dupont Highway) and Milton (at The Square in a facility that also houses sister station WRDE-LD's news studio).

=== Non-news programming ===
WBOC produces a daily talk show called DelmarvaLife and an outdoors program Outdoors Delmarva, which broadcasts on Saturdays.

=== Notable former on-air staff ===
- Hallie Jackson
- Weijia Jiang
- Oren Liebermann
- Mike Seidel
- Amber Theoharis
- Gary Tuchman

== Technical information ==
=== Subchannels ===
The station's signal is multiplexed:

Subchannels of WBOC-TV
Channel	Res.	Short name	Programming
16.1	1080i	WBOC-HD	CBS
16.2	480i	DSN	Delmarva Sports Network
21.2	720p	FOX21	Fox

A standard definition simulcast of WBOC's Telemundo Delmarva replaced the over the air broadcast of WBOC Classics in November 2017. On August 13, 2018, WBOC Classics returned over the air on WBOC. On July 26, 2021, WBOC Classics moved to WBOC-LD after WBOC-DT2 was upgraded to 720p high definition. On February 7, 2022, Delmarva Sports Network launched on 16.2, broadcasting games of local high school and college teams.

=== Analog-to-digital conversion ===
WBOC-TV ended regular programming on its analog signal, over UHF channel 16, on June 12, 2009, the official date on which full-power television stations in the United States transitioned from analog to digital broadcasts under federal mandate. The station's digital signal remained on its pre-transition UHF channel 21, using virtual channel 16.

Unlike most digital subchannels, WBOC-DT2 is one of the few that identifies with its physical digital channel number (21) rather than a virtual channel (16.2). The subchannel is known on-air as "Fox 21 Delmarva".

On August 1, 2019, WBOC-TV moved from digital UHF channel 21 to UHF channel 32 as part of the FCC repack. Despite the move, the Fox subchannel continues to use 21 in its branding and virtual channel number.
