= WKHI =

WKHI may refer to:

- WKHI (FM), a radio station (94.5 FM) licensed to serve Newark, Maryland, United States
- WWFG, a radio station (99.9 FM) licensed to serve Ocean City, Maryland, which held the call sign WKHI from 1978 to 1993
- WKZP, a radio station (95.9 FM) licensed to serve West Ocean City, Maryland, which held the call sign WKHI from 1993 to 1994
- WGBG-FM, a radio station (107.7 FM) licensed to serve Fruitland, Maryland, which held the call sign WKHI from 1996 to 2018
- WUSX, a radio station (98.5 FM) licensed to serve Seaford, Delaware, which held the call sign WKHI from August 17, 2018, to August 24, 2018
