= Maryland Department of Housing and Community Development =

Housing agency in Maryland

Agency overview
- Formed: 1987
- Jurisdiction: Maryland
- Headquarters: 7800 Harkins Road, Lanham, MD 20706 United States
- Agency executive: Jacob R. Day, Secretary
- Website: Official Website

Maryland Department of Housing and Community Development (DHCD) is a cabinet agency in the U.S. state of Maryland. The department oversees housing policy in the state and administers state housing and redevelopment programs.

The DHCD is headquartered in Lanham, Maryland.

== Origins ==
The DHCD was formed in 1987 with the passage of Senate Bill 699, which reorganized the state government agencies by creating the DHCD and the Maryland Department of Economic (today the state's Department of Commerce), while eliminating the Department of Economic and Community Development and the Department of Employment and Training.

== Functions ==
The Department administers the state's grant programs directing funding towards rental assistance, housing development, senior living projects, home repair, plumbing installations, and grocery retail projects.

The Department's Office of Tenant and Landlord Affairs produces the Maryland Tenants Bill of Rights included in all rental leases in the state.

== Secretary ==
The DHCD is headed by a Secretary who is appointed by the Governor with the advice and consent of the Maryland Senate. The Secretary advises the governor on the housing policy and on the department's operations.

The current Secretary of Housing and Community Development is Jacob R. Day. Day was appointed to the office by Governor Wes Moore in January 2023. Day is the former mayor of Salisbury, Maryland.

== Organization ==
The Maryland Department of Housing and Community Development includes the following

- Office of the Secretary
- Division of Homeless Solutions
- Division of Just Communities
- Division of Policy, Strategy and Research
- Office of Statewide Broadband
- Community Development Administration
- Division of Neighborhood Revitalization
- Division of Credit Assurance / Maryland Housing Fund
- Maryland Affordable Housing Trust
- Division of Finance

The Maryland Energy Office was managed under the DHCD until the Maryland Energy Administration was established in 1991 as an independent agency.

== Discussion ==
In 2008, the National Center for Smart Growth Research and Education (NCGS) at the University of Maryland published a study analyzing the effects of the DHCD's Community Legacy Program and Neighborhood BusinessWorks program, which provide project funding to local government bodies and community development organizations. The study found that participants complained about a "shortage of funds", inconsistent timetables for grant awards, and high turnover amongst DHCD staff.

In 2024, an audit conducted by the Maryland General Assembly's Office of Legislative Services found the DHCD did comply with state procurement regulations, failing to "always obtain and review required documentation from loan recipients" and "not adequately follow[ing]-up on instances of noncompliance reported by the loan recipients." The audit reported that "developers who were provided state government loans to provide low-income multifamily housing had tenants who exceeded the age and income limits" and that the Department reported that "high turnover of inspection staff" contributed to the issues.
