= WOSC =

WOSC may refer to:

- WOSC-CD, a low-power television station (channel 26, virtual 61) licensed to serve Pittsburgh, Pennsylvania, United States
- WKZP, a radio station (95.9 FM) licensed to serve West Ocean City, Maryland, United States, which held the call sign WOSC from 1994 to 2011
- West Ottawa Soccer club, a rec/competitive soccer club in Ottawa and Stittsville
