= Poopsie =

Poopsie may refer to:

- Poopsie, also Poopsie & Co or Oopsie Poopsie, alternative titles for Sex Pot (1975 film)
- Poopsie (1973–2011), the oldest spectacled bear recorded in captivity, at Salisbury Zoo
- Poopsie Slime Surprise, a children's toy line produced by MGA Entertainment
- Poopsie, a character in the musical The Pajama Game
