= Jacob R. Day =

American politician (born 1982)

Jake Day
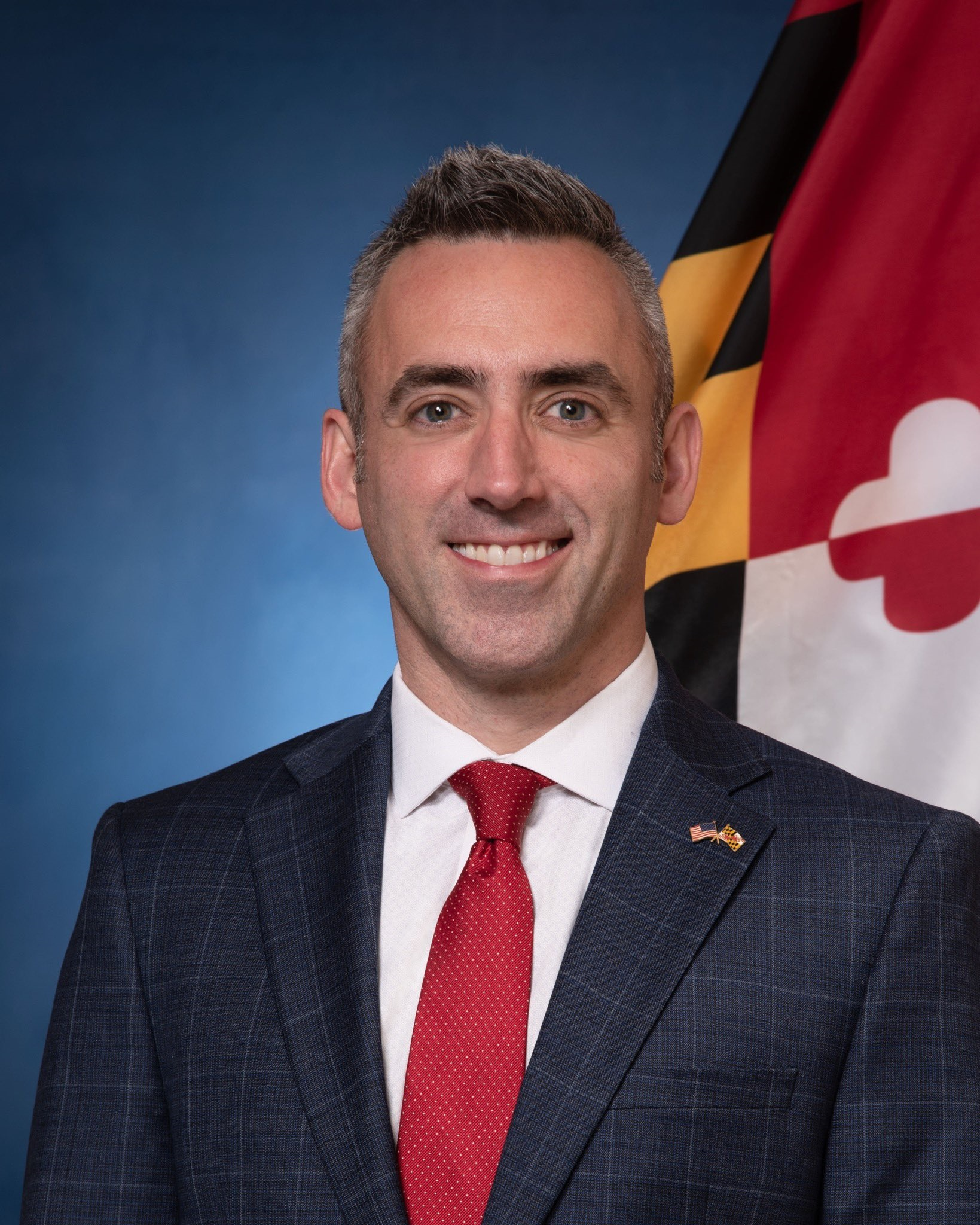
- Day in 2024

Maryland Secretary of Housing and Community Development
- Incumbent
- Assumed office January 18, 2023; Acting: January 18, 2023 – March 2, 2023
- Governor: Wes Moore
- Preceded by: Owen McEvoy (acting)

28th Mayor of Salisbury
- In office November 16, 2015 – January 27, 2023
- Preceded by: James Ireton
- Succeeded by: Jack Heath

Personal details
- Born: July 3, 1982 (age 44) Salisbury, Maryland, U.S.
- Party: Democratic
- Children: 2
- Education: University of Maryland, College Park (BS); Carnegie Mellon University (MA); Christ Church, Oxford (MS)

Military service
- Allegiance: United States
- Branch/service: United States Army
- Years of service: 2009–present
- Rank: Major
- Unit: Army Special Operations Command

Jacob R. Day (born July 3, 1982) is an American politician currently working as the Maryland Secretary of Housing and Community Development. Born and raised in Salisbury, Maryland, Day represented District 2 of the Salisbury City Council, later serving as the council president from 2013 to 2015, and was the mayor of Salisbury from 2015 to 2023.

On January 17, 2023, Governor-elect Wes Moore nominated Day to serve as the Secretary of Housing and Community Development. He took office on January 18, resigning as the mayor of Salisbury on January 27, 2023. During his tenure, he has supported efforts to increase new housing development in Maryland. Day is a member of the Special Operations Detachment-NATO in the Maryland Army National Guard and US Army Special Operations Command.

== Background ==
Day was one of the three children born to father Randy Day, the CEO of Perdue Farms from 2017 to 2023, and mother Debbie, a retired teacher. He grew up in Salisbury and pursued a career in architecture and urban design. He earned a Bachelor of Science in architecture from the University of Maryland, College Park, a Master of Arts in urban design from Carnegie Mellon University, and a Master of Science in environmental policy from Christ Church, Oxford.

On July 8, 2015, Day announced his candidacy in the nonpartisan Salisbury mayoral election, challenging incumbent Democratic mayor Jim Ireton. Ireton later decided against running for re-election, instead running for the Salisbury City Council in District 4. Day was elected on November 3, 2015, after running unopposed on a platform that included improving the city's infrastructure, attracting economic growth through business-first initiatives, and creating jobs.

== Mayor of Salisbury ==
Day was sworn in as the mayor of Salisbury on November 16, 2015. He was subsequently re-elected in 2019. He also served as the President for the Maryland Municipal League from 2021 to 2022. During his time in office, the city experienced a nearly 30 percent growth in the number of manufacturing jobs, a 175 percent increase in the total existing housing in Salisbury, and a decrease in statistical crime rates in the city every year since 2017. The city's S&P Global Ratings bond rating also improved to AA.

Day announced that he would resign as mayor on January 17, 2023, the same day that Governor-elect Wes Moore nominated him to serve as the Maryland Secretary of Housing. He recommended Salisbury City Council president Jack Heath as the Acting Mayor, which was approved by the City Council that evening. His resignation went into effect on January 27, 2023.

=== Downtown revitalization ===
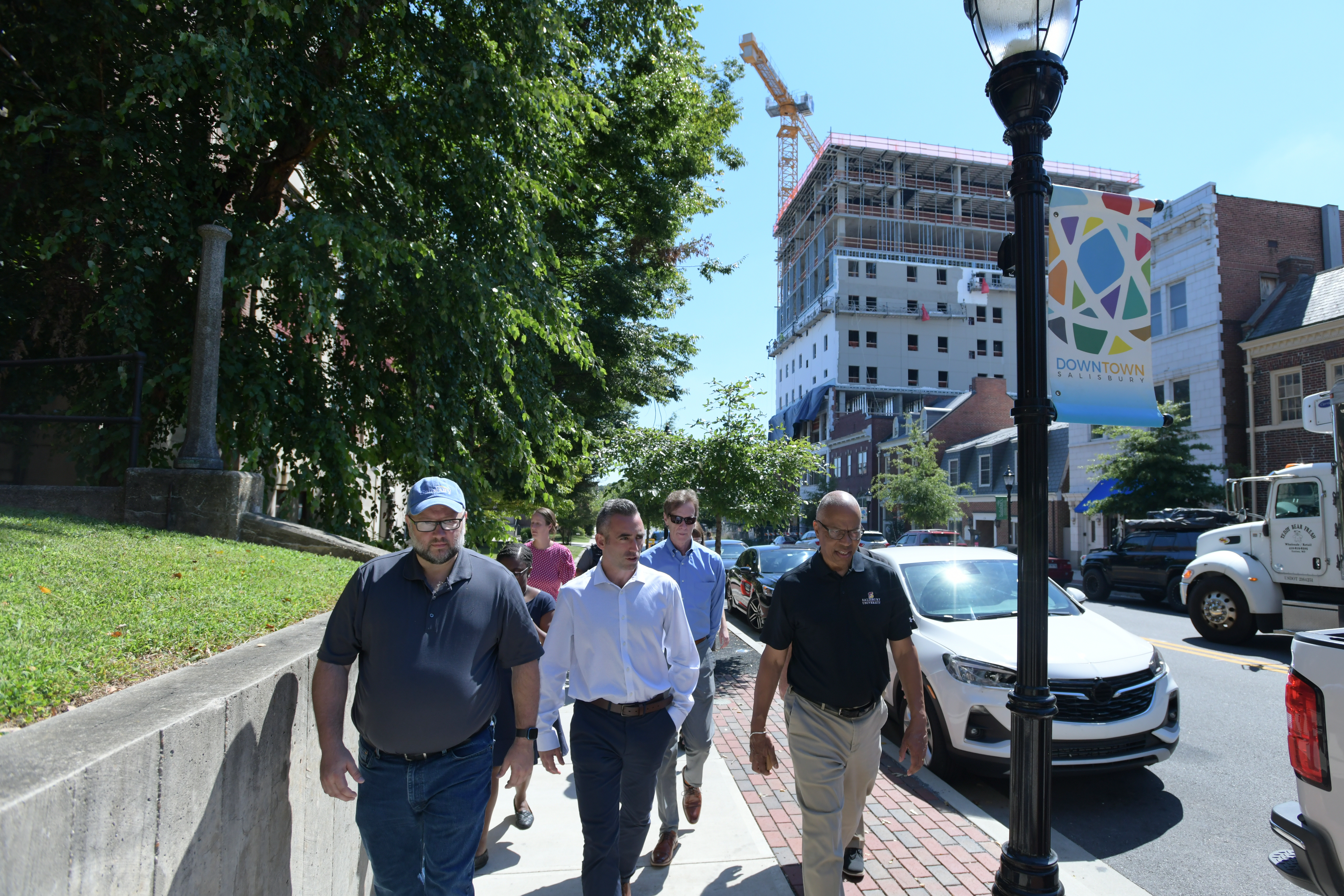
Day walks through downtown Salisbury with Lieutenant Governor Boyd Rutherford, 2022

As mayor of Salisbury, one of Day's biggest objectives was revitalizing the downtown area of the city, saying in November 2015 that he hoped Salisbury would one day be able to compete with other small cities in Maryland such as Frederick. His administration focused heavily on reshaping the city's streets, undertaking projects including the revitalization of the city's Main Street, Fitzwater Street, the Downtown Plaza, the Riverwalk, and Unity Square. Some of this was in preparation for the National Folk Festival, which the city hosted annually from 2019 to 2022, and beginning in 2023 the Maryland Folk Festival.

Day's administration also oversaw the launch of the "Housing First" policy in 2017, which places homeless residents in houses or apartments. Salisbury was the first small city in the United States to adopt a Housing First program, which was previously adopted in larger cities including New York City, Los Angeles, and Washington, D.C. In September 2021, Day announced the "Here is Home" initiative to build a tiny home village to house the homeless.

In March 2017, in an effort to keep Salisbury University graduates in the city, Day collaborated with SU President Janet Dudley-Eshbach to launch the Buy a Home, Build a Business program, which offered $5,000 of downpayment, legal guidance, business development advice, and closing cost assistance to graduates looking to start a business in Salisbury.

In February 2018, Day announced a partnership between Salisbury, Salisbury University, and Spin for a dockless bike sharing program.

In March 2019, Day adopted the Vision Zero policy, which sought to eliminate all pedestrian deaths and serious injuries caused by vehicles by January 2030. As of November 2022, injury accidents have fallen 19 percent and all categories of accidents have declined since the policy's adoption.

In June 2021, Day announced a collaboration between Salisbury and Bird, which debuted rentable electric scooters in the city, replacing the previous Spin bikes.

=== COVID-19 pandemic response ===
In March 2020, Day declared a state of emergency for the COVID-19 pandemic in Salisbury. In April, he implemented occupancy limits in retailers and commercial facilities to limit the spread of the COVID-19 virus, as well as social distancing protocols, and worked with Annapolis mayor Gavin Buckley to support the #MayorsWithMasks initiative, which promoted the use of face coverings while outdoors. In May, he announced a number of measures to protect small business and renters from the effects of the pandemic. These included a ban on rent increases under a state of emergency. an allotment of over $100,000 for those whose wages have been affected by the pandemic, and donating 5,000 masks to those living in low-income neighborhoods.

== Military service ==
Day enlisted in the United States Army in 2009. He completed Basic Combat Training at Fort Benning, Georgia in 2010 and commissioned as a Second Lieutenant in 2011 through Officer Candidate School. He completed his Basic Officer Leader Course at United States Army Armor School, becoming an Armor Branch and United States Cavalry Officer. His education has included Information Operations Qualification Course, Maneuver Captains Career Course, Basic Airborne Course at United States Army Airborne School, Command and General Staff Officers Course, among other schools.

His first assignment was as Executive Officer of Bravo Troop, 1-158th Cavalry, 58th Battlefield Surveillance Brigade. He later served as a Platoon Leader in Bravo Troop, Platoon leader in Alpha Troop and Executive Officer of Alpha Troop. Later assignments included Aide-de-Camp to Brigadier General Peter C. Hinz, Platoon Trainer and Senior Platoon Trainer at the Officer Candidate School, Information Operations Officer at 110th Information Operations Battalion, and Cognitive Warfare Officer at Special Operations Detachment-OTAN/NATO (SOD-O).

=== 2020 deployment ===
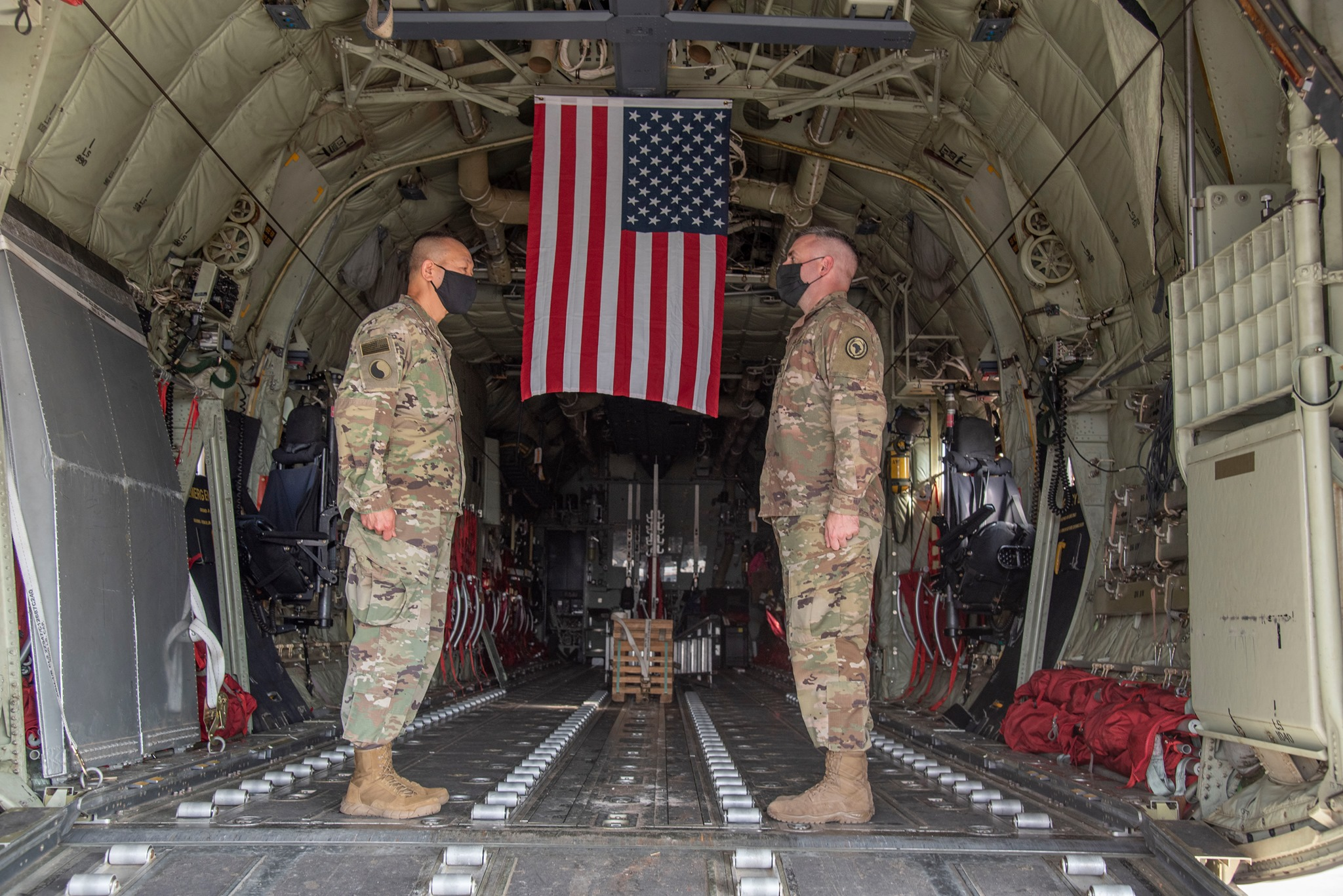
Day was promoted to the rank of Major by U.S. Army Major General Lapthe Flora during a ceremony in a C-130 Hercules on November 28, 2020, at Camp Lemonnier.

On May 28, 2020, Day announced that he would be deployed to the Horn of Africa for 10 months with the Combined Joint Task Force – Horn of Africa through the Maryland Army National Guard. Day served as Deputy Director of Information Operations and Special Technical Operations Chief for Combined Joint Task Force-Horn of Africa. In his absence, City Administrator Julia Glanz acted as the mayor of Salisbury, effective from June 4, 2020, until his return on May 21, 2021. He was promoted to the rank of Major, on November 28, 2020, during his deployment. Day was deployed again in Estonia and Latvia from May to June 2022.

At the time of his deployment, Day was one of three U.S. mayors deployed during their terms in office, including Pete Buttigieg from South Bend, Indiana and Brent Taylor from North Ogden, Utah.

In April 2021, Day was named in a report from the Maryland National Guard Bureau Office of Equity and Inclusion, in which he was accused of receiving and not forwarding reports of discrimination against Sergeant Bruce Weaver, a Black soldier who alleges that his all-white trainers forced him to wear a chain, representing the "chain of command" during training at the Delaware Army National Guard officer candidate school, in 2015. The Maryland National Guard exonerated its personnel after multiple internal investigations and appealed the bureau's decision. Day rejected any association with the claims, releasing a statement on social media saying "I am pained to have my name spoken in relation to the 2015 incident I was not even present to witness".

=== Awards and decorations ===
U.S. military decorations
Defense Meritorious Service Medal
Meritorious Service Medal
Army Commendation Medal with oak leaf cluster
Joint Service Achievement Medal with oak leaf cluster
Army Achievement Medal with oak leaf cluster
U.S. Unit Awards
Joint Meritorious Unit Award
Meritorious Unit Commendation
U.S. Service (Campaign) Medals and Service and Training Ribbons
Army Reserve Components Achievement Medal with oak leaf cluster
National Defense Service Medal
Global War on Terrorism Expeditionary Medal
Global War on Terrorism Service Medal
Armed Forces Reserve Medal
Army Service Ribbon
Army Overseas Service Ribbon

Badges
US Army Airborne basic parachutist badge	Parachutist Badge
	Chilean Parachutist badge
	158th Cavalry Regiment Regimental Distinctive Insignia
	United States Army Special Operations Command Distinctive Unit Insignia
Seal of the United States Africa Command	United States Africa Command Combat Service Identification Badge
	1 Overseas Service Bar

== Maryland Secretary of Housing ==
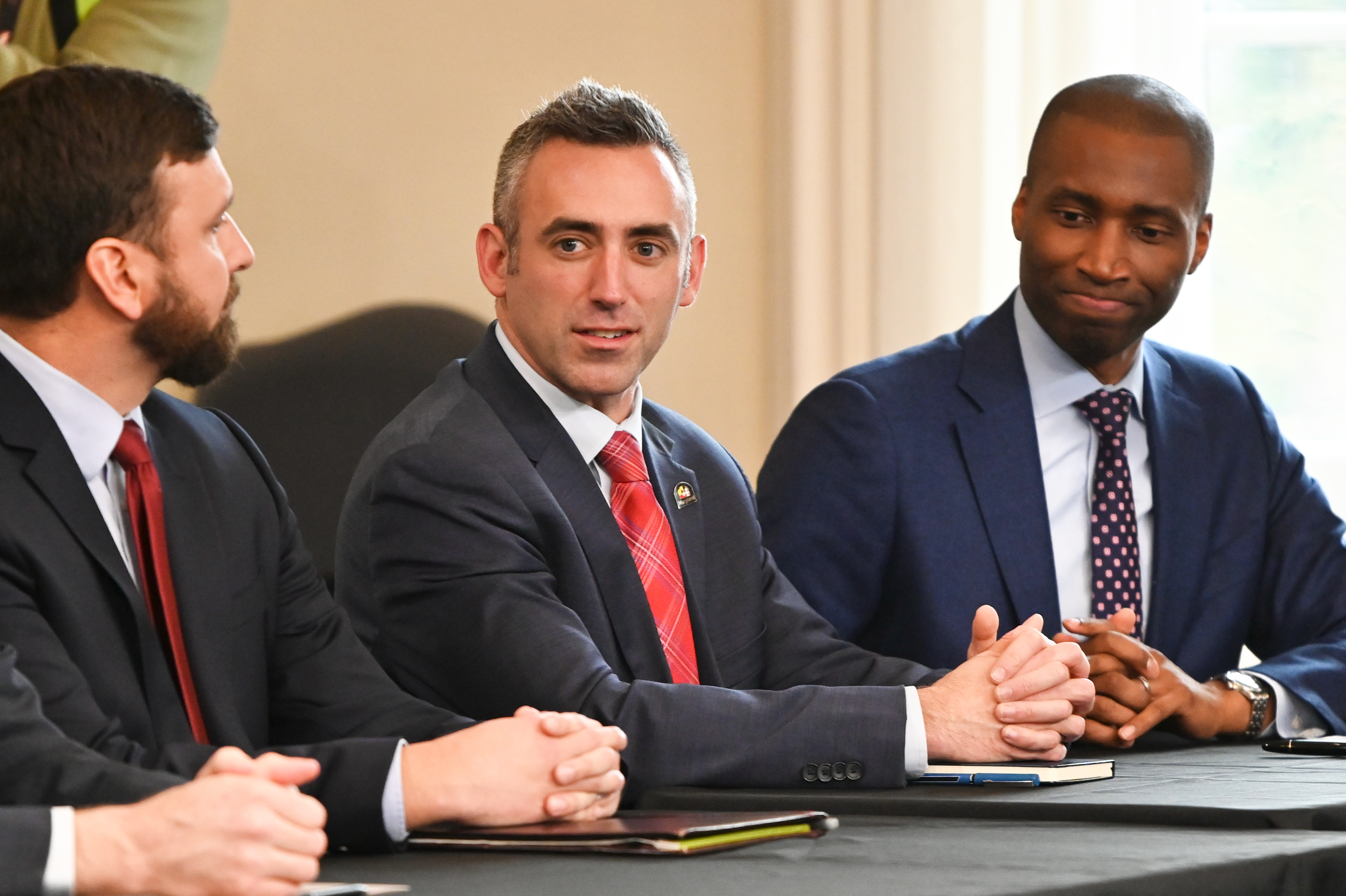
Day as Maryland Secretary of Housing and Community Development, 2023

On January 17, 2023, Governor-elect Wes Moore nominated Day to serve as the Maryland Secretary of Housing and Community Development. He took office on January 18. His nomination was unanimously approved by the Maryland Senate on February 17.

During the 2024 legislative session, Day testified on the Moore administration's bills to increase federal funding and reducing barriers for affordable housing projects in the state, especially those around commuter rail stations, as well as legislation establishing a "Tenant's Bill of Rights" and providing additional protections to renters against evictions. These bills passed and were signed into law. He also expressed skepticism toward proposals to impose rent caps to address the state's housing crisis, suggesting that it could dissuade developers from building more housing in Maryland, but added that he would not rule out a statewide rent stabilization measure in the future.

During the 2025 legislative session, Day supported the Housing for Jobs Act, which would have prevented local governments from blocking or stalling new development projects. The Housing for Jobs Act faced opposition from the Maryland Association of Counties, which expressed concerns that the bill would force counties to approve housing in some situations, prompting legislators to rewrite the bill into the Housing Development Act, which would have assigned housing production targets to each county and provided five-year protections to a project's development rights. The Housing Development Act failed to pass out of the Maryland General Assembly.

== Political positions ==
=== Environment ===
In April 2017, Day said he opposed the Trump administration's decision to cut funding toward Chesapeake Bay cleanup programs from the federal budget. In October 2021, he attended a virtual discussion hosted by U.S. Senator Ben Cardin, where he emphasized the need for federal and state support to support their climate change mitigation and resiliency plans.

In November 2022, Day signed into law a city ordinance that would ban plastic bags in retail stores and restaurants. The ban went into effect on July 1, 2023.

=== Labor ===
In May 2022, Day said he supported a proposed charter amendment to extend collective bargaining rights to all city employees. The charter amendment was unanimously approved by the Salisbury City Council in September 2022.

=== Social issues ===
In 2014, after a Daily Times investigation found that minorities made up only one-sixth of the city's staff members despite making up 47 percent of the city's population, Day called for measures to increase government diversity.

In July 2014, Day supported increasing Salisbury's city council districts from two to five, with two of the newly drawn districts being majority minority districts. The district map, which was supported by the American Civil Liberties Union of Maryland and the Wicomico County NAACP, was adopted by the Salisbury city council by a 4–1 vote in September 2014.

In August 2017, following the Unite the Right rally in Charlottesville, Virginia, Day joined more than 300 municipal leaders in backing an initiative that called for implementing anti-hate and anti-bias education in schools and law enforcement agencies, ensuring aggressive enforcement of civil rights laws, and strengthening hate crime laws.

In June 2017, Day called for the removal of a memorial of Confederate general John Henry Winder from the lawn of the old Wicomico County courthouse in Salisbury. In January 2020, Day established the Lynching Memorial Task Force, a group that would research creating a permanent monument to commemorate African-Americans lynched in Wicomico County. In July 2020, Day celebrated the removal of the Winder memorial, and in June 2021, he dedicated a new memorial in its place to Matthew Williams, a Black man who was lynched in Salisbury in 1931.

=== Statewide and national politics ===
In October 2018, Day endorsed Governor Larry Hogan for re-election in the 2018 Maryland gubernatorial election. In March 2021, he endorsed Comptroller Peter Franchot for Governor of Maryland.

In November 2019, Day endorsed South Bend mayor Pete Buttigieg in the 2020 Democratic Party presidential primaries.

In July 2021, Day endorsed former state delegate Heather Mizeur in the 2022 United States House of Representatives election in Maryland's 1st congressional district.

== Personal life ==
Day lives in the Camden neighborhood of Salisbury with his two daughters.

== Electoral history ==
Salisbury City Council District 2 election, 2013
Candidate	Votes	%
Jacob R. Day	1,698	71.34
Deborah Campbel (incumbent)	680	28.57
Write-in	2	0.08

Salisbury City mayoral election, 2015
Candidate	Votes	%
Jacob R. Day	1,413	96.58
Write-in	50	3.42

Salisbury City mayoral election, 2019
Candidate	Votes	%
Jake Day	2,444	84.95
Wayne King	428	14.88
Write-in	5	0.17
