= Faith Baptist School (Salisbury, Maryland) =

Location
- 30505 Dagsboro Road; Maryland's Eastern Shore, Delmarva; Salisbury, Wicomico, Maryland 21804; USA; 38°25′13″N 75°33′14″W

Information
- School type: Private Preschool, Elementary, Middle School, Junior High School, High School
- Religious affiliation: Christian
- Denomination: Baptist
- Founded: 1983
- Founder: Robert Reinert
- Status: Enrolling
- School board: Deacon Board of Faith Baptist Church
- Administrator: Matthew George
- Staff: 3
- Faculty: 16
- Grades: K4-12
- Gender: Coeducational
- Age: 4 years old to 18 years old
- Enrollment: 130
- Average class size: 12 students
- Color: Maroon Gray
- Slogan: Pursuing Excellence for the Cause of Christ
- Song: Victory in Jesus
- Athletics: Junior Varsity, Varsity
- Athletics conference: Delaware Valley Christian Athletic Conference
- Sports: Soccer, Volleyball, Basketball
- Mascot: Falcon
- Tuition: $5,433.00 annually
- Website: https://fbsfalcons.org/

Faith Baptist School (commonly abbreviated FBS) is a private Christian preschool, elementary school, middle school, and high school located in Salisbury, Wicomico County, Maryland. It is a church school and enrolls grades K4 through 12th grade. The school's mascot is a falcon, and its school colors are maroon and gray.

Faith Baptist School is a member school of the Maryland Association of Christian Schools and the American Association of Christian Schools.

== History ==
Faith Baptist School opened its doors in 1983 with 17 students. Kindergarten through sixth grade were the first grades offered. The school's first administrator, Mark Jago, along with Mrs. Martha Wood and Mrs. Kim Sterling, made up the school's original faculty. Mr. Jago was responsible for choosing the falcon as the school's mascot as well as the grey and maroon color scheme. In the school's second year, its student population doubled. Each successive year after its inception, the school would add a new grade until it reached the full complement it retains today.

Historically, FBS students have participated in the community around them, such as local contests, handbell and choir concerts, and other volunteer opportunities. In 2014, a fourth grader placed first in the region for her essay in the Maryland Municipal League‘s "If I Were Mayor" essay contest.

== Current administration ==
- Faith Baptist School board - Deacon board of Faith Baptist Church and appointed additional members
- School president - Pastor Christopher Jochum
- Administrator - Mr. Matthew George

== Membership ==
- American Association of Christian Schools

== See also ==
- List of high schools in Maryland
- Manna March 2014 including FBS
- School's Listing on Church Exempt List of the Maryland State Department of Education Site
- School's listing as a member of the Maryland Association of Christian Schools
- School's listing on the American Association of Christian Schools Website
