= Maryland Energy Administration =

Agency in Maryland

Agency overview
- Formed: 1991
- Jurisdiction: Maryland
- Headquarters: Baltimore, Maryland
- Agency executive: Kelly Speakes-Backman, Director
- Website: https://energy.maryland.gov/

The Maryland Energy Administration (MEA) is an independent agency in the U.S. state of Maryland. The agency works to promote energy efficiency, advance renewable energy in Maryland, and reduce the state's greenhouse gas emissions. The agency administers state grants and incentive programs for energy projects.

== History ==
The MEA was established by statue in 1991, in House Bill 217. The act dissolved the Maryland Energy Office, a division of the Maryland Department of Housing and Community Development, and established the MEA as an independent agency. The organization is headquartered in Baltimore, Maryland.

Former Maryland legislator Paul G. Pinsky served as Director of the MEA from 2023 to 2025 after being appointed by Governor Wes Moore. After his retirement, Governor Moore appointed Kelly Speakes-Backman, a former commissioner of the Maryland Public Service Commission, as Director. She assumed the role in December 2024.

== Functions ==
The Maryland Energy Administration manages grants and incentive programs funded by Maryland's Strategic Energy Investment Fund (SEIF). SEIF receives funding from Regional Greenhouse Gas Initiative auctions, compliance from electrical suppliers, and fund interest. The MEA is wholly funded by SEIF. The MEA awards grants to Maryland residents, businesses, non-profits, and other government units.

MEA's grant and incentive programs support rooftop solar, community solar, electric vehicle, energy storage, geothermal, heat pump, and electric bus projects. The agency disburses approximately $200 million in grants and rebates annually.

The MEA advises the Governor and state lawmakers on energy issues as well, appearing in hearings to the Maryland Senate's Education, Energy, and the Environment Committee and the Maryland House of Delegates' Environment and Transportation Committee.

The Administration also enforces appliance efficiency standards in Maryland and is empowered to issue fines for noncompliance and report offenses to the Maryland Attorney General

== Discussion ==
In October 2025, the Baltimore Sun editorial board suggested that the Maryland Energy Administration, Maryland Public Service Commission, and the Office of People's Counsel failed to provide "decisive, centralized leadership" on energy issues and instead contributed to a "convoluted policy landscape that confuses and frustrates Maryland taxpayers." The board instead recommended a centralized state agency similar to the federal Department of Energy.

A 2017 University of Maryland study assessed MEA's Clean Burning Wood Stove Grant Program, which provides state homeowners funding to install wood-burning stoves. The study found that few homeowners were aware of the program, but suggested that increasing the program's incentives could spur program participation.

== See also ==
- Solar power in Maryland
- Wind power in Maryland
