= Lynching of Garfield King =

Garfield King
- Born: c. 1880
- Died: Outside the courthouse in Salisbury, Maryland
- Known for: victim of lynching

Garfield King (c. 1880 – May 25, 1898) was a black man lynched by a mob in Salisbury, Maryland. He reportedly shot Herman Kenney, a 22-year-old white man with a revolver after arguing.

== Lynching ==
Around 11 p.m on May 25, 1898, a number of men from Trappe approached the jail that King was being held in while awaiting trial for the shooting. By 12 a.m their numbers had reached about 100, both local and from outside of Salisbury. Shortly after they demanded that Sheriff Dashiell hand over the keys to the jail. After the Sheriff refused, the men used a telegraph pole as a ram to force open the gates of the jail. Once inside, the leader of the mob used a sledge hammer to break open the lock on King's cell. King was dragged from his cell to the courtyard, where the crowd tied a clothesline around his neck and hung him from a tree. King survived the initial hanging as the clothesline that was used broke. After a few minutes unconscious, King awoke and attempted to escape. He was then shot and beaten before a stronger rope was tied around his neck and he was strung up for a second time. King's body was riddled with more than 50 pistol and gunshot wounds. Newspapers reported that his body was "shot to pieces." The crowd dispersed around 2 a.m.

After the lynching, King's body was cut down and lain at the engine house. Crowds of people reportedly stole the threads of the rope that was used to hang King as a souvenir. King was later buried at the Potter's field of the city after his father was unable to retrieve his body.

A week afterwards, a coroner's inquest was opened into in order to identify the leader and participants of the lynching. Over 50 witnesses were called to give evidence, but no one was definitively identified. The leader of the lynching was described as a tall, lean man wearing a mask. It was reported that the leader may have been involved in other lynchings around the Eastern Shore of Maryland. Identification of the other men involved with the killing was hampered as many of them had their faces blackened or reddened. The verdict of the inquest concluded that King had been killed by unknown parties, and no charges were ever brought in his death.

== Legacy ==
On May 31, a group of local African-Americans convened in the John Wesley Methodist Episcopal Church and drafted a resolution condemning the lynching that was published in The Salisbury Advertiser on June 4, 1898.

His murder and the murders of two other victims of lynching in Salisbury were memorialized by the erection of a plaque next to the old Salisbury courthouse on May 23, 2021 by the Salisbury Lynching Memorial Task Force and the Equal Justice Initiative.
