= WSBY-FM =

- Salisbury, Maryland; United States
- Broadcast area: Delmarva Peninsula (Salisbury-Ocean City)
- Frequency: 98.9 MHz
- Branding: Magic 98.9

Programming
- Format: Urban adult contemporary
- Affiliations: Premiere Networks

Ownership
- Owner: iHeartMedia, Inc.; (iHM Licenses, LLC)
- Sister stations: WJDY, WKZP, WQHQ, WTGM, WWFG

History
- First air date: December 13, 1989
- Call sign meaning: Salisbury

Technical information
- Licensing authority: FCC
- Facility ID: 13673
- Class: A
- ERP: 6,000 watts
- HAAT: 99 meters (325 ft)
- Transmitter coordinates: 38°18′01″N 75°37′36″W

Links
- Public license information: Public file; LMS
- Webcast: Listen live (via iHeartRadio)
- Website: mymagic989.iheart.com

WSBY-FM (98.9 FM) is a commercial radio station licensed to Salisbury, Maryland, United States, and serving the Delmarva Peninsula. It broadcasts an urban adult contemporary format known as "Magic 98.9." It is owned by iHeartMedia, Inc. Studios are located at Gateway Crossing on Tilghman Road; the transmitter is on Old Eden Road in Fruitland, Maryland, off U.S. Route 13.

== History ==
The station first signed on the air on December 13, 1989. It was acquired by Clear Channel Communications in 2000. Clear Channel was a forerunner to today's iHeartMedia. WSBY-FM has served the African-American community for most of its history.

former logo
