= WJDY =

- Salisbury, Maryland; United States
- Broadcast area: Salisbury-Ocean City
- Frequency: 1470 kHz
- Branding: Newsradio 1470 WJDY

Programming
- Format: News/talk
- Affiliations: Fox News Radio; Premiere Networks; Salem Radio Network; Townhall; Westwood One

Ownership
- Owner: iHeartMedia, Inc.; (iHM Licenses, LLC)
- Sister stations: WKZP, WQHQ, WSBY-FM, WTGM, WWFG

History
- First air date: March 14, 1958

Technical information
- Licensing authority: FCC
- Facility ID: 13672
- Class: D
- Power: 5,000 watts day; 43 watts night
- Transmitter coordinates: 38°23′30.00″N 75°38′48.00″W

Links
- Public license information: Public file; LMS
- Webcast: Listen live (via iHeartRadio)
- Website: newsradio1470.iheart.com

WJDY (1470 AM) is a radio station broadcasting a news/talk format. It is licensed to Salisbury, Maryland, United States, and owned by iHeartMedia, Inc. WJDY is identified on-air as Newsradio 1470, with Fox News Radio updates at the top and bottom of each hour.

On March 1, 1999, WJDY became an affiliate of Radio Disney.

The station used to broadcast Bloomberg Radio, a sports format under the Fox Sports Radio network, a news/talk format using the CNN Headline News service and before that, it was adult standards.
