= WTGM =

- Salisbury, Maryland; United States
- Broadcast area: Salisbury metropolitan area
- Frequency: 960 kHz
- Branding: Fox Sports Radio 960

Programming
- Language: English
- Format: Sports radio
- Network: Fox Sports Radio
- Affiliations: Delmarva Shorebirds; Baltimore Orioles; Baltimore Ravens

Ownership
- Owner: iHeartMedia; (iHM Licenses, LLC)
- Sister stations: WJDY; WKZP; WQHQ; WSBY-FM; WWFG

History
- First air date: September 13, 1940
- Former call signs: WBOC (1940–1980); WSBY (1980–1989); WLVW (1989–1993)
- Former frequencies: 1500 kHz (1940–1941); 1230 kHz (1941–1948)
- Call sign meaning: "The Game" (original nickname); former reflection of sister station WTEM

Technical information
- Licensing authority: FCC
- Facility ID: 28165
- Class: B
- Power: 5,000 watts
- Transmitter coordinates: 38°25′44.4″N 75°37′24.7″W

Links
- Public license information: Public file; LMS
- Webcast: Listen live (via iHeartRadio)
- Website: foxsports960.iheart.com

WTGM (960 AM) is a radio station broadcasting a sports format. Licensed to Salisbury, Maryland, United States, the station is currently owned by iHeartMedia. WTGM is located on the Delmarva Peninsula, and that is shown on the Fox Sports station logo.

== History ==
The station was originally WBOC on 1500 kHz, and began broadcasting in 1940. It is the oldest surviving radio station on the Eastern Shore. WBOC relocated to 1230 a year later and slid down to 960 in 1948, which permitted a power increase from 250 to 1,000 watts. It was initially owned by the Peninsula Broadcasting Company and broadcast from Radio Park on north U.S. Route 13. In the mid-1950s WBOC increased its daytime power to 5,000 watts.

WBOC radio and WBOC-TV were acquired by the A.S. Abell Company in 1961, and the licensee changed to WBOC, Inc. In 1980, the WBOC cluster was split up, and MarDel Communications bought the station, which changed its callsign to WSBY. MarDel moved the transmitter again to its current location and increased nighttime power to 5,000 watts. The station received new calls, WLVW, in 1989. (The WLVW callsign was later used by an FM station in Salisbury with an oldies format, that station is now K-Love affiliate WLDW.)

By 1993, WLVW had come under common ownership with WTEM in Washington, DC, and on August 30, 1993, it became WTGM with a sports talk format known as "The Game". Eventually, WTGM picked up a Fox Sports Radio affiliation and changed its name to Sports Talk 960 (using similar imaging to WTEM). During this time, it carried the games of the minor league Delmarva Shorebirds (which still air on the station) and around 50 games of their parent club, the Baltimore Orioles, as well as college sports from the University of Maryland-Eastern Shore and Salisbury University and high school sports. It also had a number of local shows, such as The Endzone with Ed, Frank and Jon, which ran from 2004 to 2008).

=== Expanded Band assignment ===
On March 17, 1997, the Federal Communications Commission (FCC) announced that eighty-eight stations had been given permission to move to newly available "Expanded Band" transmitting frequencies, ranging from 1610 to 1700 kHz, with WTGM authorized to move from 960 to 1670 kHz.

A construction permit for the expanded band station was assigned the call letters WAWR on January 9, 1998. However this station was never built, and its construction permit was cancelled on December 22, 2000.

=== Later history ===
WTGM was acquired by Cumulus Media in 1997 and swapped to Clear Channel Communications in 2000 as part of a station exchange related to the latter's merger with AMFM.

On February 22, 2011, WTGM rebranded as "The Sports Animal". On October 29, 2012, the station changed formats to comedy, branded as "Comedy 960". On August 4, 2014, following the end of the 24/7 Comedy network, Fox Sports Radio moved back to WTGM, as "Fox Sports Radio 960".
