= Lynching of Matthew Williams =

African American lynched in 1931

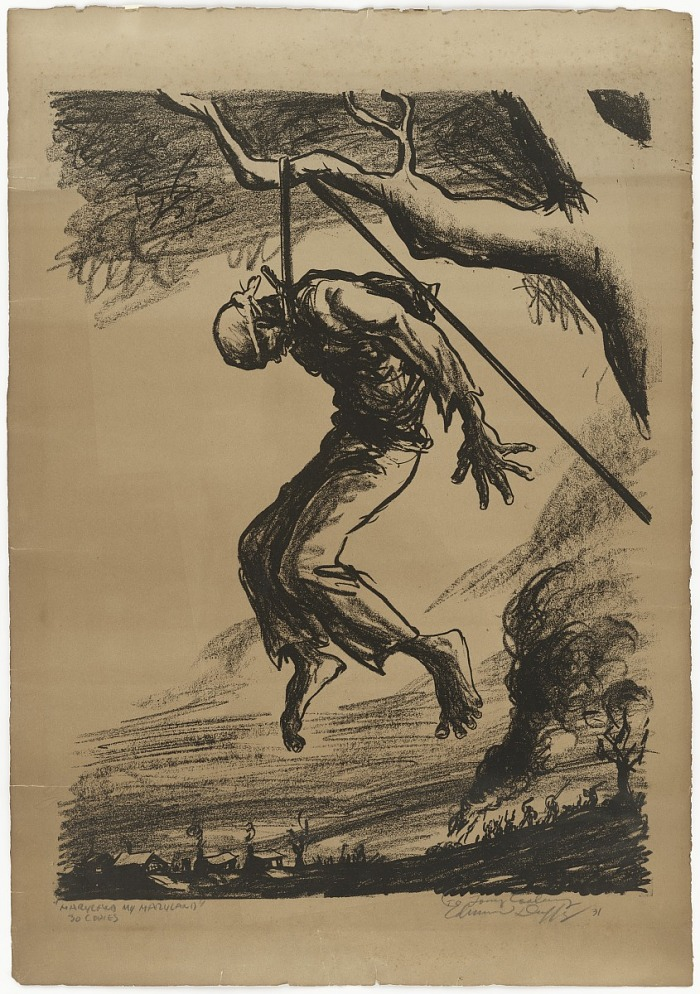
Depiction of the lynching of Matthew Williams by Edmund Duffy. From the collection of the Smithsonian National Museum of African American History and Culture, Gift of Allen Seeber

Matthew Williams (February 8, 1908 – December 4, 1931) was a black man lynched by a white mob in Salisbury, Maryland, on December 4, 1931.

== Life of Matthew Williams ==
Matthew Williams was born to Harry Williams and Annie née Hardy on February 8, 1908, in Norfolk, Virginia. Only a few years later, he lost both of his parents: his mother died of pneumonia in 1912, and his father died in 1915. Williams and his older sister, Olivia, were then sent to live with their maternal grandmother, Mary Handy, in Salisbury, Maryland.

Williams attended school until he was fourteen, when his grandmother died. He then took a job at the Elliot Box and Crate Factory and was known for keeping to himself and earning an impressive amount of money for a black laborer at the time. Professor and civil rights lawyer Sherrilyn Ifill wrote in her book, On the Courthouse Lawn, that Matthew Williams was reported to have $56 in savings at the time of his death. He was extremely conscious of his finances, depositing half of it in the Farmers' and Merchants' Bank of Salisbury and the other half in the Prudential Bank after hearing about the bank failures during the Depression era. There was no trace of this money after his death.

On the afternoon of December 4, 1931, a supposed confrontation at work led to Williams being hospitalized at Peninsula General Hospital (now Peninsula Regional Medical Center). He was placed in the "Negro Ward" in a straitjacket, with his head bandaged so that he could not see. Williams was severely injured from bullet wounds, but his death occurred much later.

Allegedly, Matthew Williams went to his employer's office, and the two began arguing over wages. During the argument, Matthew Williams allegedly shot Daniel Elliott, killing him, and then attempted to use the gun on himself. It was further reported that Daniel Elliott's son, James Elliott, then found the two and, using the same gun, fired two more shots at Matthew Williams, wounding him in the chest and leg.

However, the 1970s biography of Dorchester County waterman Joseph L. Sutton recounts a different story, stating that others claimed the culprit was his son, James Elliot. Allegedly, James killed his father, Daniel, then later shot Williams to prevent him from bearing witness against him. James later said that Williams shot Daniel and he took the gun shortly afterward, wounding Williams.

Eventually, Williams was dragged from the hospital by an angry mob that had heard of the incident. Although local police were present, they did not try to stop the mob from lynching Williams on the courthouse green. Hours later, after the body was hanged and burned, the authorities removed Williams' body.

== Legacy/aftermath ==
=== Sherrilyn Ifill’s On the Courthouse Lawn ===
On December 1, 2007, Sherrilyn Ifill released a book titled On the Courthouse Lawn. The book includes significant discussion of the lynching of Matthew Williams and the responses of residents and institutions in Salisbury, Maryland.

In writing her book, Ifill stated that she did not intentionally single out the Eastern Shore. However, during her research on lynchings across the nation, she found the Eastern Shore to be an ideal example of how communities have failed to confront the legacy of lynching./

In conducting her research, Ifill gained substantial insight into not only the history of lynchings but also their enduring impact on communities on the Eastern Shore. In an interview following the publication of her book, she explained that the most disturbing part of her research was not the lynchings themselves, but the silence surrounding their existence.

In On the Courthouse Lawn, Ifill outlines the history of lynchings on the Eastern Shore and suggests that the racial violence experienced is not merely a historical account but a trust-shattering reality that taints relationships between the varying communities on the Eastern Shore. Ifill found that while many white residents of the Eastern Shore were unaware of the lynchings, many black Eastern residents reported that these lynchings have fostered a legacy of fear and mistrust.

=== Historical marker ===
A historical marker for Confederate John H. Winder that previously stood in front of the courthouse in downtown Salisbury was removed and a new marker that outlines the lynchings of Garfield King, Matthew Williams, and another unknown male, all lynched in Wicomico County was placed in front of the courthouse where two of the lynchings occurred.

=== Vigils ===
Eastern Shore communities have engaged in is hosting vigils on the anniversaries of crimes.
