= WQHQ =

- Ocean City-Salisbury, Maryland; United States
- Broadcast area: Salisbury-Ocean City Delmarva
- Frequency: 104.7 MHz
- Branding: Q105

Programming
- Format: Adult contemporary
- Affiliations: Premiere Networks

Ownership
- Owner: iHeartMedia; (iHM Licenses, LLC)
- Sister stations: WJDY; WKZP; WSBY-FM; WTGM; WWFG

History
- First air date: 1965 (as WBOC-FM)
- Former call signs: WBOC-FM (1965–1980)

Technical information
- Licensing authority: FCC
- Facility ID: 28166
- Class: B
- ERP: 33,000 watts
- HAAT: 186 meters (610 ft)
- Transmitter coordinates: 38°23′15.4″N 75°17′28.6″W

Links
- Public license information: Public file; LMS
- Webcast: Listen live (via iHeartRadio)
- Website: q105fm.iheart.com

WQHQ (104.7 FM) is a radio station broadcasting an adult contemporary format. Licensed to Ocean City and Salisbury, Maryland, United States, the station is owned by iHeartMedia.
