= Salisbury, Maryland =

Salisbury
- City
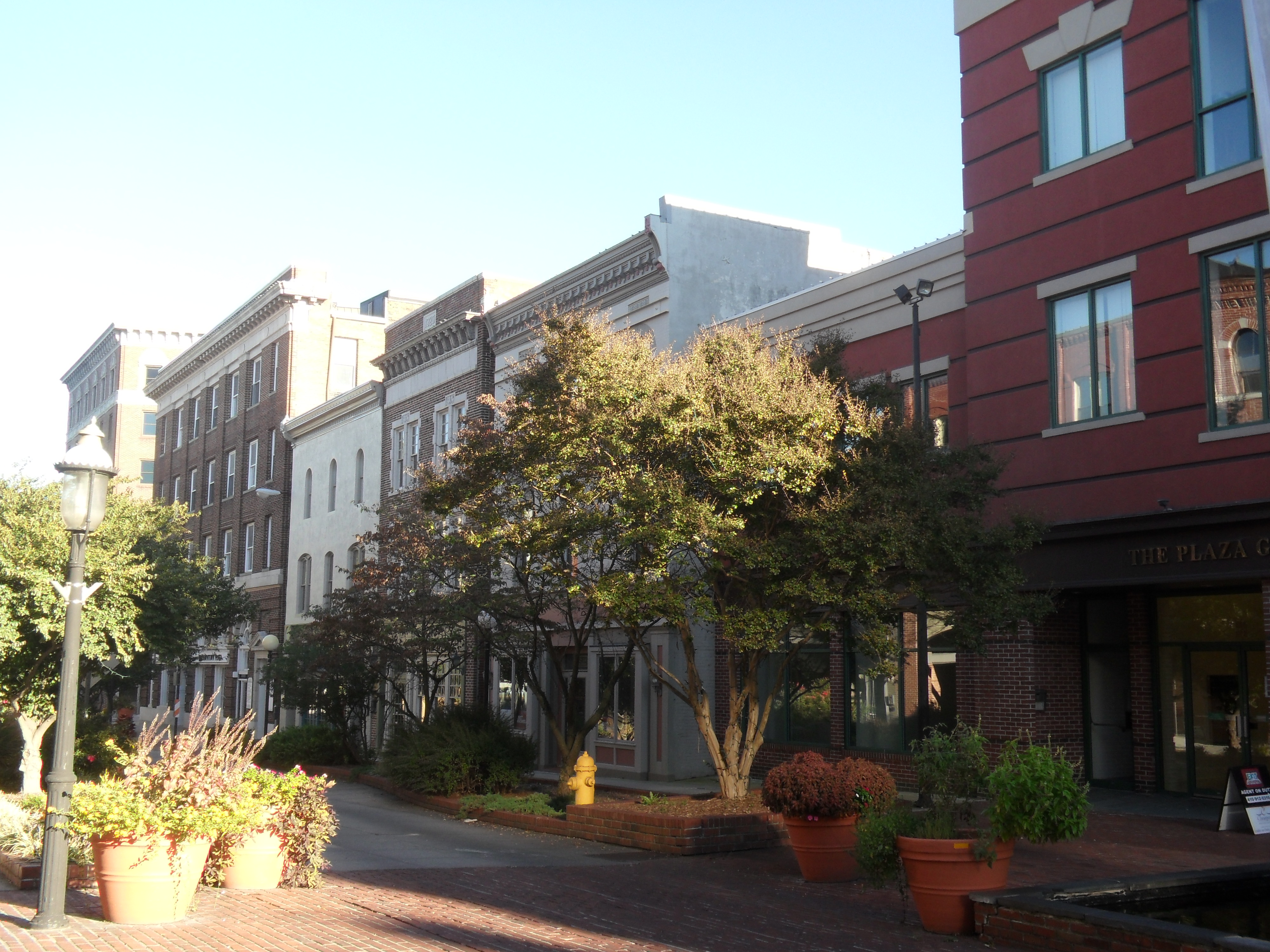
- Main Street in Salisbury

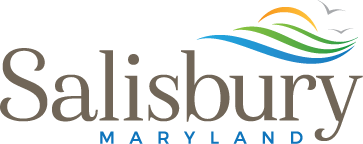
- Flag Seal Wordmark
- Motto: The Comfortable Side of Coastal
- Location in Wicomico County in Maryland

- Location in Maryland Salisbury (the United States)
- Coordinates: 38°21′57″N 75°36′01″W
- Country: United States
- State: Maryland
- County: Wicomico
- Founded: 1732
- Incorporated: 1854

Government
  - Type: Strong-mayor
  - Mayor: Randolph J. Taylor (R)
  - City Council: April Jackson (President); Sharon Dashiell (Vice President); Angela Blake; Michele Gregory; Melissa Holland

Area
  - City: 14.27 sq mi (36.97 km^{2})
  - Land: 13.78 sq mi (35.70 km^{2})
  - Water: 0.49 sq mi (1.27 km^{2}) 3.39%
- Elevation: 26 ft (8 m)

Population (2020)
  - City: 33,050
  - Density: 2,397.6/sq mi (925.71/km^{2})
  - Urban: 78,075
  - Metro: 128,208
- Demonym: Salisburian
- Time zone: UTC−5 (Eastern)
  - Summer (DST): UTC−4 (Eastern)
- ZIP codes: 21801-21804
- Area code: 410, 443, 667
- FIPS code: 24-69925
- GNIS feature ID: 0591221
- Website: salisbury.md

Salisbury (/ˈsɔːlzbəri/ SAWLZ-bə-ree) is a city in and the county seat of Wicomico County, Maryland, United States. Salisbury is the largest city in the state's Eastern Shore region, with a population of 33,050 at the 2020 census. Salisbury is the principal city of the Salisbury, Maryland Metropolitan Statistical Area. The city is a commercial hub of the Delmarva Peninsula.

== History ==
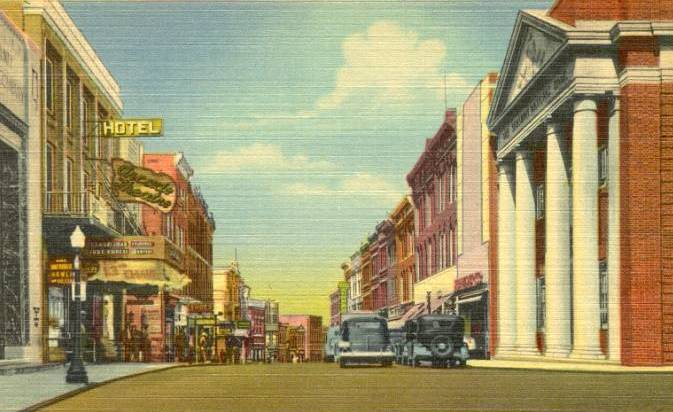
Main Street in the 1930s

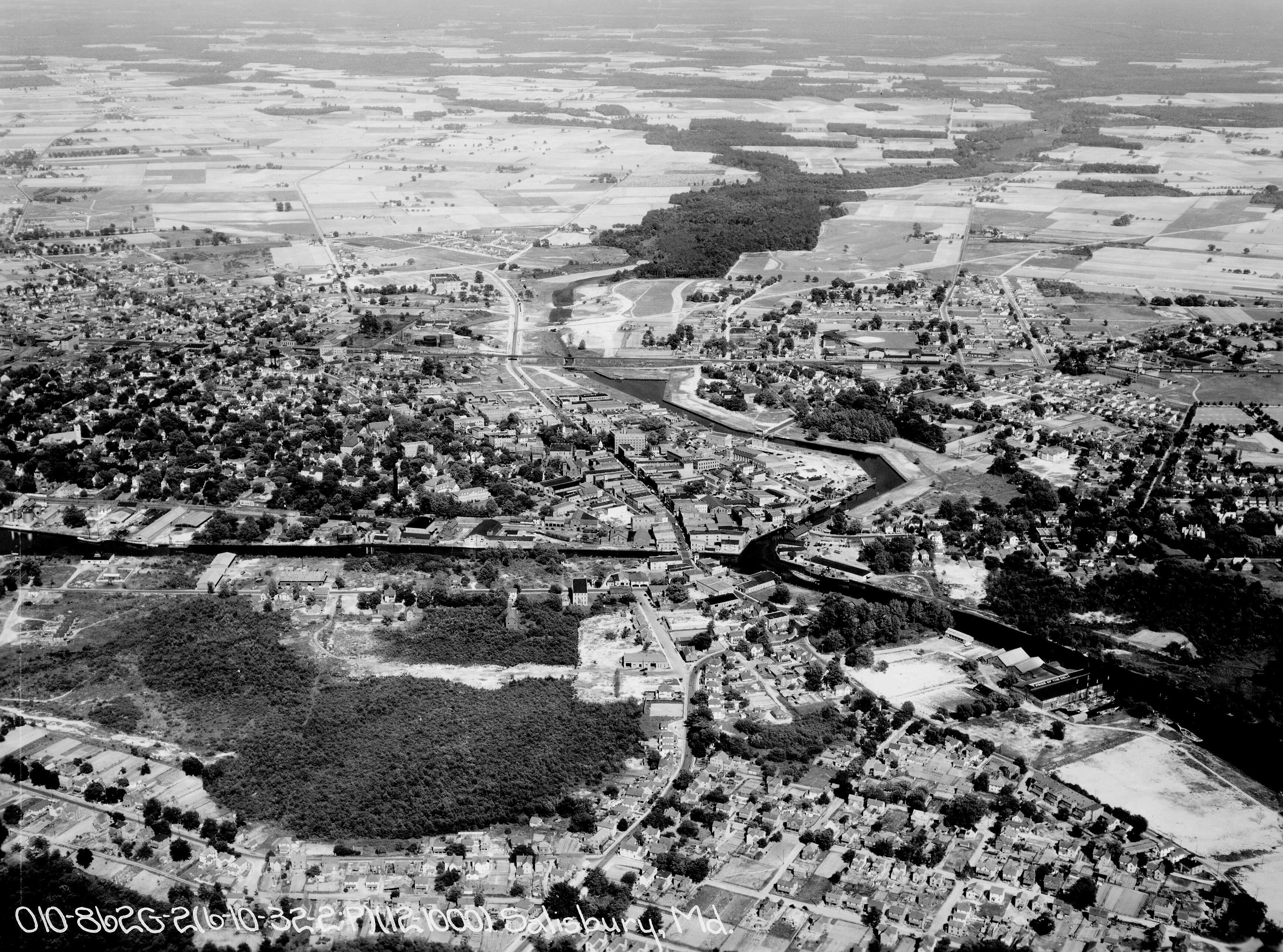
Aerial view of Salisbury, 1932

Salisbury's location at the head of Wicomico River was a major factor in growth. At first, it was a small colonial outpost set up by Lord Baltimore. Salisbury was established in 1732.

Salisbury's location at the head of the Wicomico River was seen to be a convenient location for trading purposes. Due to the similar physical attributes as well as the nationality of Salisbury's founders, many historians believe that the name was inspired by the city of Salisbury, England, an ancient cathedral city.

Salisbury was officially incorporated as a city in 1854.

Salisbury also had a role in the American Civil War, as it served as a location where Union forces encamped to search for sympathizers from the South. These Union forces also worked to inhibit the movement of contraband to Confederate forces in the South.

Fires struck Salisbury in both 1860 and 1886, burning through two-thirds of the Town. Despite the fires, Salisbury and the country that surrounded it continued to grow, and Salisbury was considered to be the major town of the county. In 1909, the Humphrey's Dam burst, flooding portions of Salisbury.

In 1867, when Wicomico County was formed out of parts of both Somerset and Worcester Counties, Salisbury became the government seat.

In 1898 and 1931, three Black men were lynched in Salisbury. Town leaders, including the fire chief and police chief, were allegedly complicit in the lynchings.

In 1968, protests occurred in Salisbury after a police officer fatally shot a deaf and mute African-American man. The protests prompted Maryland Governor Spiro Agnew to declare Martial Law and send the Maryland National Guard to Salisbury.

Today, Salisbury attracts a wide variety of different businesses in addition to the county, state, and federal government offices.

Adding to the diversity of Salisbury, the City is host to a wide variety of events celebrating local culture and the arts. These events include 3rd Friday, an event held in downtown Salisbury on the third Friday of each month, celebrating local music, artists, and nonprofit organizations.

Salisbury is also home to a historical City Park, the Salisbury Zoo, The Centre at Salisbury shopping mall, and the Wicomico Youth & Civic Center.

The Gillis-Grier House, Honeysuckle Lodge, Sen. William P. Jackson House, Pemberton Hall, Perry-Cooper House, Poplar Hill Mansion, Union Station, and F. Leonard Wailes Law Office are listed on the National Register of Historic Places.

On 7 August 2017, an EF1 tornado went through Salisbury. The damage marker leading to the rating goes as follows, "Small Retail Building [Fast Food Restaurants] Uplift of roof decking; significant loss of roof covering." The tornado reached maximum intensity over Dogwood Park, Salisbury.

== Geography ==
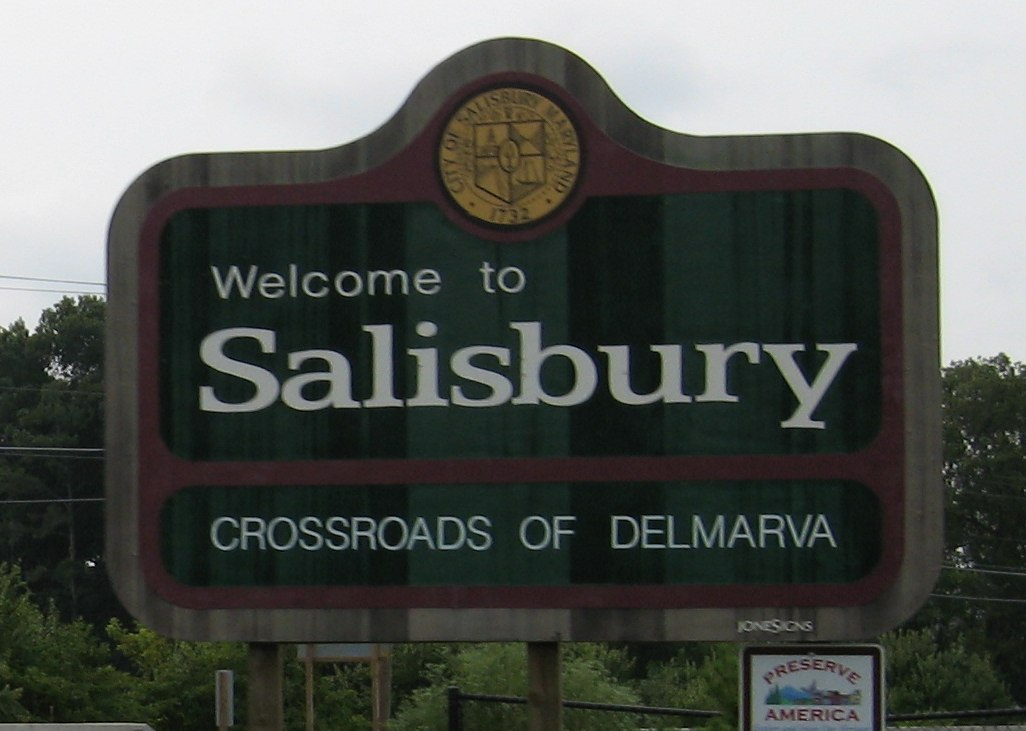
Sign at northern entrance on U.S. Route 13.

According to the United States Census Bureau, the city has a total area of 13.87 square miles (35.92 km^{2}), of which 13.40 square miles (34.71 km^{2}) is land and 0.47 square miles (1.22 km^{2}) is water. The city is situated 17 to 45 feet (5.2 to 13.7 m) above sea level.

The nearest major cities are Baltimore, 106 miles (171 km) away, Washington, D.C., 119 miles (192 km) away, and Philadelphia, 128 miles (206 km) away.

=== Climate ===
Salisbury's location on the Atlantic Coastal Plain in Maryland gives it a humid subtropical climate (Köppen climate classification Cfa), with hot, humid summers and, on average, cool to mild winters. The monthly daily average temperature at nearby Wicomico Regional Airport ranges from 36.8 °F (2.7 °C) in January to 77.9 °F (25.5 °C) in July; on average, there are 30 days of 90 °F (32 °C)+ highs annually and 7 days where the high fails to rise above freezing. On average, Salisbury annually receives around 47.49 in (1,210 mm) of precipitation, with 8.0 in (20.3 cm) of snowfall per year. Record temperatures range from −10 °F (−23 °C) on January 11, 1942, up to 106 °F (41 °C) on July 21, 1930 and August 7, 1918. However, temperatures reaching 0 °F (−18 °C) and lower, or 100 °F (37.8 °C) and higher, are rare, having last occurred January 9, 2017 and July 27, 2012, respectively.

Climate data for Salisbury, Maryland (Wicomico Regional Airport), 1991–2020 normals, (Note: Mean monthly maxima and minima (i.e. the expected highest and lowest temperature readings at any point during the year or given month) calculated based on data at said location from 1991 to 2020.) extremes 1906–present)
Month	Jan	Feb	Mar	Apr	May	Jun	Jul	Aug	Sep	Oct	Nov	Dec	Year
Record high °F (°C)	77 (25)	80 (27)	93 (34)	96 (36)	98 (37)	102 (39)	106 (41)	106 (41)	100 (38)	98 (37)	85 (29)	77 (25)	106 (41)
Mean maximum °F (°C)	68.1 (20.1)	68.5 (20.3)	76.8 (24.9)	84.4 (29.1)	89.9 (32.2)	94.4 (34.7)	97.0 (36.1)	94.7 (34.8)	90.9 (32.7)	84.8 (29.3)	75.1 (23.9)	68.7 (20.4)	97.8 (36.6)
Mean daily maximum °F (°C)	45.5 (7.5)	48.2 (9.0)	55.3 (12.9)	66.1 (18.9)	74.4 (23.6)	82.9 (28.3)	87.5 (30.8)	85.4 (29.7)	79.5 (26.4)	69.2 (20.7)	58.6 (14.8)	49.8 (9.9)	66.9 (19.4)
Daily mean °F (°C)	36.8 (2.7)	38.7 (3.7)	45.3 (7.4)	55.1 (12.8)	63.8 (17.7)	72.7 (22.6)	77.9 (25.5)	75.8 (24.3)	69.7 (20.9)	58.5 (14.7)	48.2 (9.0)	40.6 (4.8)	56.9 (13.8)
Mean daily minimum °F (°C)	28.0 (−2.2)	29.2 (−1.6)	35.2 (1.8)	44.1 (6.7)	53.2 (11.8)	62.6 (17.0)	68.3 (20.2)	66.3 (19.1)	59.9 (15.5)	47.8 (8.8)	37.9 (3.3)	31.4 (−0.3)	47.0 (8.3)
Mean minimum °F (°C)	8.2 (−13.2)	12.4 (−10.9)	18.7 (−7.4)	28.2 (−2.1)	37.2 (2.9)	46.4 (8.0)	55.9 (13.3)	54.1 (12.3)	44.5 (6.9)	30.9 (−0.6)	21.7 (−5.7)	15.7 (−9.1)	5.6 (−14.7)
Record low °F (°C)	−10 (−23)	−4 (−20)	1 (−17)	15 (−9)	28 (−2)	37 (3)	42 (6)	45 (7)	34 (1)	23 (−5)	10 (−12)	−6 (−21)	−10 (−23)
Average precipitation inches (mm)	3.51 (89)	3.25 (83)	4.17 (106)	3.42 (87)	3.73 (95)	4.03 (102)	4.73 (120)	5.27 (134)	4.48 (114)	4.15 (105)	3.16 (80)	3.59 (91)	47.49 (1,206)
Average snowfall inches (cm)	2.5 (6.4)	3.4 (8.6)	1.0 (2.5)	0.2 (0.51)	0.0 (0.0)	0.0 (0.0)	0.0 (0.0)	0.0 (0.0)	0.0 (0.0)	0.0 (0.0)	0.0 (0.0)	0.9 (2.3)	8.0 (20)
Average precipitation days (≥ 0.01 in)	10.5	9.7	11.5	10.9	11.7	10.9	10.2	9.4	9.1	9.0	8.7	10.7	122.3
Average snowy days (≥ 0.1 in)	1.5	1.5	0.6	0.2	0.0	0.0	0.0	0.0	0.0	0.0	0.1	0.8	4.7
Source: NOAA

Climate data for Salisbury, Maryland (COOP, 38.365°N 75.58917°W), 1991–2020 normals
Month	Jan	Feb	Mar	Apr	May	Jun	Jul	Aug	Sep	Oct	Nov	Dec	Year
Mean daily maximum °F (°C)	47.4 (8.6)	50.4 (10.2)	57.8 (14.3)	68.9 (20.5)	77.0 (25.0)	84.5 (29.2)	88.6 (31.4)	86.3 (30.2)	80.9 (27.2)	70.7 (21.5)	60.1 (15.6)	51.7 (10.9)	68.7 (20.4)
Daily mean °F (°C)	38.4 (3.6)	40.4 (4.7)	47.3 (8.5)	57.5 (14.2)	66.0 (18.9)	74.6 (23.7)	79.2 (26.2)	77.0 (25.0)	71.2 (21.8)	60.3 (15.7)	50.2 (10.1)	42.3 (5.7)	58.7 (14.8)
Mean daily minimum °F (°C)	29.3 (−1.5)	30.4 (−0.9)	36.7 (2.6)	46.2 (7.9)	55.1 (12.8)	64.6 (18.1)	69.7 (20.9)	67.6 (19.8)	61.5 (16.4)	50.0 (10.0)	40.4 (4.7)	32.9 (0.5)	48.7 (9.3)
Average precipitation inches (mm)	3.58 (91)	3.19 (81)	4.20 (107)	3.57 (91)	3.72 (94)	4.32 (110)	4.83 (123)	5.26 (134)	4.33 (110)	3.93 (100)	3.41 (87)	3.67 (93)	48.01 (1,219)
Average precipitation days (≥ 0.01 in)	10.7	9.2	11.4	11.0	10.3	10.4	9.8	9.6	8.4	9.1	9.3	10.7	119.9
Source: NOAA

== Demographics ==
Historical population
Census	Pop.	Note	%±
1850	947		—
1870	2,064		—
1880	2,581		25.0%
1890	2,905		12.6%
1900	4,277		47.2%
1910	6,690		56.4%
1920	7,553		12.9%
1930	10,997		45.6%
1940	13,313		21.1%
1950	15,141		13.7%
1960	16,302		7.7%
1970	15,252		−6.4%
1980	16,429		7.7%
1990	20,592		25.3%
2000	23,743		15.3%
2010	30,343		27.8%
2020	33,050		8.9%
2025 (est.)	33,845		2.4%
U.S. Decennial Census

Salisbury is the principal city of the Salisbury, Maryland-Delaware Metropolitan Statistical Area, which consists of Somerset, Wicomico, and Worcester counties in Maryland and Sussex County in Delaware.

=== Racial and ethnic composition ===
Salisbury city, Maryland – Racial and ethnic composition Note: the US Census treats Hispanic/Latino as an ethnic category. This table excludes Latinos from the racial categories and assigns them to a separate category. Hispanics/Latinos may be of any race.
Race / Ethnicity (NH = Non-Hispanic)	Pop 2000	Pop 2010	Pop 2020	% 2000	% 2010	% 2020
White alone (NH)	14,111	16,032	13,220	59.43%	52.84%	40.00%
Black or African American alone (NH)	7,612	10,278	13,676	32.06%	33.87%	41.38%
Native American or Alaska Native alone (NH)	41	61	78	0.17%	0.20%	0.24%
Asian alone (NH)	743	962	1,221	3.13%	3.17%	3.69%
Native Hawaiian or Pacific Islander alone (NH)	6	11	17	0.03%	0.04%	0.05%
Other race alone (NH)	38	85	167	0.16%	0.28%	0.51%
Mixed race or Multiracial (NH)	386	786	1,642	1.63%	2.59%	4.97%
Hispanic or Latino (any race)	806	2,128	3,029	3.39%	7.01%	9.16%
Total	23,743	30,343	33,050	100.00%	100.00%	100.00%

=== 2020 census ===
As of the 2020 census, Salisbury had a population of 33,050 and a population density of 2,265.2 inhabitants per square mile (874.6/km^{2}). The median age was 32.8 years. 23.0% of residents were under the age of 18 and 14.8% were 65 years of age or older. For every 100 females there were 85.5 males, and for every 100 females age 18 and over there were 81.6 males age 18 and over; males made up 45.7% of the population and females 54.3%.

There were 13,578 households in Salisbury, of which 29.6% had children under the age of 18 living in them. Of all households, 26.4% were married-couple households, 21.9% were households with a male householder and no spouse or partner present, and 42.7% were households with a female householder and no spouse or partner present. About 34.4% of all households were made up of individuals and 13.9% had someone living alone who was 65 years of age or older; the average household had 2.50 persons.

There were 15,062 housing units, of which 9.9% were vacant. The homeowner vacancy rate was 2.6% and the rental vacancy rate was 7.4%.

100.0% of residents lived in urban areas, while 0.0% lived in rural areas.

Racial composition as of the 2020 census
Race	Number	Percent
White	13,624	41.2%
Black or African American	13,897	42.0%
American Indian and Alaska Native	177	0.5%
Asian	1,232	3.7%
Native Hawaiian and Other Pacific Islander	18	0.1%
Some other race	1,656	5.0%
Two or more races	2,446	7.4%

=== 2010 census ===
As of the census of 2010, there were 30,343 people, 11,983 households, and 6,040 families residing in the city. The population density was 2,264.4 inhabitants per square mile (874.3/km^{2}). There were 13,401 housing units at an average density of 1,000.1 per square mile (386.1/km^{2}). The racial makeup of the city was 55.7% White, 34.4% African American, 0.3% Native American, 3.2% Asian, 0.1% Pacific Islander, 3.1% from other races, and 3.2% from two or more races. Hispanic or Latino of any race were 7.0% of the population.

There were 11,983 households, of which 29.1% had children under the age of 18 living with them, 26.4% were married couples living together, 19.1% had a female householder with no husband present, 5.0% had a male householder with no wife present, and 49.6% were non-families. 32.5% of all households were made up of individuals, and 12% had someone living alone who was 65 years of age or older. The average household size was 2.42 and the average family size was 3.04.

The median age in the city was 28.1 years. 21.7% of residents were under the age of 18; 22.9% were between the ages of 18 and 24; 25.4% were from 25 to 44; 18.8% were from 45 to 64; and 11.1% were 65 years of age or older. The gender makeup of the city was 46.3% male and 53.7% female.

=== 2000 census ===
As of the census of 2000, there were 23,743 people, 9,061 households, and 4,802 families residing in the city. The population density was 2,145.5 inhabitants per square mile (828.4/km^{2}). There were 9,612 housing units at an average density of 868.6 per square mile (335.4/km^{2}). The racial makeup of the city was 60.71% White, 32.32% African American, 0.23% Native American, 3.19% Asian, 0.03% Pacific Islander, 1.47% from other races, and 2.06% from two or more races. Hispanic or Latino of any race were 3.39% of the population.

There were 9,061 households, out of which 27.4% had children under the age of 18 living with them, 30.4% were married couples living together, 18.2% had a female householder with no husband present, and 47.0% were non-families. 33.5% of all households were made up of individuals, and 12.2% had someone living alone who was 65 years of age or older. The average household size was 2.36 and the average family size was 3.00. In 2005, 324 new single family homes were built, with an average value of $119,358.

In the city, the age distribution of the population shows 21.8% under the age of 18, 21.8% from 18 to 24, 26.9% from 25 to 44, 17.0% from 45 to 64, and 12.5% who were 65 years of age or older. The median age was 29 years. For every 100 females, there were 87.2 males. For every 100 females age 18 and over, there were 82.9 males.

The median income for a household in the city was $29,191, and the median income for a family was $35,527. Males had a median income of $26,829 versus $21,920 for females. The per capita income for the city was $15,228. About 16.5% of families and 23.8% of the population were below the poverty line, including 28.9% of those under age 18 and 10.2% of those age 65 or over.

== Crime ==
=== Notable crimes ===
Garfield King (c. 1880 – May 25, 1898) was a black man lynched by a mob in Salisbury. He was hung next to the courthouse after he reportedly shot Herman Kenney, a 22-year-old white man, with a revolver after arguing with him.

In December 1931, Salisbury was the site of another lynching of a black man. Matthew Williams was accused of murdering his white employer, Daniel J. (DJ) Elliot, at his office on Lake Street. The authorities found D.J. Elliot dead at his desk, his son, James Elliot present, and Matthew Williams incapacitated by several gunshot wounds. After being taken to Peninsula General Hospital, a 300-man white mob threw Williams from a second-floor window to the crowd below, where he was stabbed, tied to a truck and dragged three blocks to the county court house. There they hanged him from a tree, before he had any chance of a trial. The mob paraded Williams' body through the black part of Salisbury for intimidation, and mutilated and burned him. It was the 32nd lynching in Maryland since 1882. No one was prosecuted for Williams' killing, as was typical in lynchings. As of 2007, there was no commemoration of the extrajudicial killing.

A 2017 memorial for Matthew Williams reignited the call for commemoration of the lynchings, with the known location of Matthew Williams' lynching (Wicomico County Circuit Courthouse lawn) emerging as the focal point. On this site, however, stood a sign some saw as antithetical to the sacred nature of the site as the location of one of the last lynchings in Maryland: a marker commemorating Confederate General John H. Winder. A 2018 documentary film (The Sign) was produced, documenting and unraveling the complexities of this conflict, "exposing deep wounds from the complicated history of the Eastern Shore."

In January 2020, Mayor Jake Day announced the formation of a Lynching Memorial Task Force which was tasked with "coordinating with the Equal Justice Initiative's Community Remembrance Project to facilitate the creation of a permanent monument in honor and solemn remembrance of the three American citizens who lost their lives at the hands of lynch mobs in Wicomico County."

On July 5, 2023, a mass shooting occurred during a block party just outside of the city limits, leading to the death of a 14-year-old child and seven other injuries. Following an investigation involving the Wicomico County Sheriff's Office and the Salisbury Police Department, the suspected shooter was arrested on September 11.

=== Statistics ===
Crime statistics
Year	Part One Crimes	% Change
2007	2,862	
2008	2,655	-7.23
2009	3,147	18.53
2010	2,688	-14.59
2011	2,169	-19.31
2012	2,199	1.38
2013	2,089	-5.00
2014	2,110	1.01
2015	2,091	-0.90
2016	1,979	-5.36
2017	2,089	5.56
2018	1,821	-12.83
2019	1,695	-6.92
2020	1,319	-22.18

Crime in 2019 was the lowest in the city's history, with the five safest years on record being 1986, 1996, 2016, 2018, and 2019. Part One crimes, which are included in the table to the right, consist of the more serious crimes, including shoplifting, burglary, assault, theft, and rape.

== Government ==
Salisbury is a municipality within Wicomico County. The form of government is strong-mayor, as defined by the City Charter. In this form, executive functions are vested in a popularly elected mayor who serves a four-year term; currently Randy Taylor. The Mayor is the chief executive officer and the head of the administrative branch of the city government. In that role, he is responsible for overseeing the various departments in the city, ensuring that the ordinances of the city are executed, providing an annual report on the financial condition and accomplishments of the city, appointing the heads of all departments and members of committees and commissions, prepare an annual budget, and supervise the City administrator who manages day-to-day functions. The City Administrator is the supervisor of all department heads, except the City Clerk and City Attorney. The City Administrator may also perform all other tasks delegated by the Mayor. Legislative and oversight functions are the purview of the elected council. The five council members are elected to four-year terms from the city's five districts. City elections are non-partisan. The council meets in regular session the second and fourth Monday of each month in Council Chambers. Council work sessions are held the first and third Monday of each month. The council also holds the ability to fill vacancies in the council or appoint an acting mayor when a vacancy occurs.

=== Mayors of Salisbury ===
As of 2023, there have been 29 mayors of Salisbury, listed to the right.

Mayors of Salisbury
Name	From	To
A. G. Toadvine	1888	1890
Thomas Humphreys	1890	1894
Randolph Humphreys	1894	1898
Jehu T. Parsons	1898	1900
C. R. Disharoon	1900	1904
Charles E. Harper	1904	1910
William F. Bounds	1910	1912
B. Frank Kennerly	1912	1914
William F. Bounds	1914	1916
I. E. Jones	1916	1920
W. Arthur Kennerly	1920	1924
L. Thomas Parker Sr.	1924	1928
Wade H. Insley Sr.	1928	1934
E. Sheldon Jones	1934	1936
Alfred T. Truitt Sr.	1936	1938
Arthur W. Boyce	1938	1940
Virgil Hitchens	1940	1946
E. R. White Jr.	1946	1950
Rollie W. Hastings	1950	1958
Jeremiah Valiant	1958	1959
Boyd E. McLernon	1959	1962
Frank H. Morris	1962	1966
Dallas G. Truitt	1966	1974
Elmer F. Ruark	1974	1982
W. Paul Martin	1982	1998
Barrie Parsons Tilghman	1998	2009
James P. Ireton Jr.	2009	2015
Jacob R. Day	2015	2023
John "Jack" R. Heath	2023	2023
Randolph J. Taylor	2023	

During times of extended absence, a mayor may delegate the majority of their duties to the City Administrator, such in 2020 when Mayor Jacob R. Day was deployed to Africa as an information operations officer with the 110th Information Operations Battalion of the Maryland Army National Guard. Mayor Day said "City Administrator Julia Glanz will take over executive duties for the duration of the deployment". Vacancies in the office of the mayor are filled by a majority vote of the City Council, with an Acting Mayor.

=== All-America City Award ===
On June 18, 2010 Salisbury received the All-America City Award. The City received the award for three projects:

- The revitalization of Rose and Lake Street neighborhoods in partnership with nonprofit organization Salisbury Neighborhood Housing, Inc, the State of Maryland, Parkside High School CTE program, Hebron Savings Bank, and a grant from the Community Foundation of the Eastern Shore.
- The Youth Leadership Academy which developed leadership in students in grades 8–11.
- Homeless initiatives including the Code Blue Shelter operated by nonprofit organization Hope And Life Outreach (HALO) with assistance for veterans from nonprofit NATRA, Inc., which provides counseling services.

== Economy and businesses ==
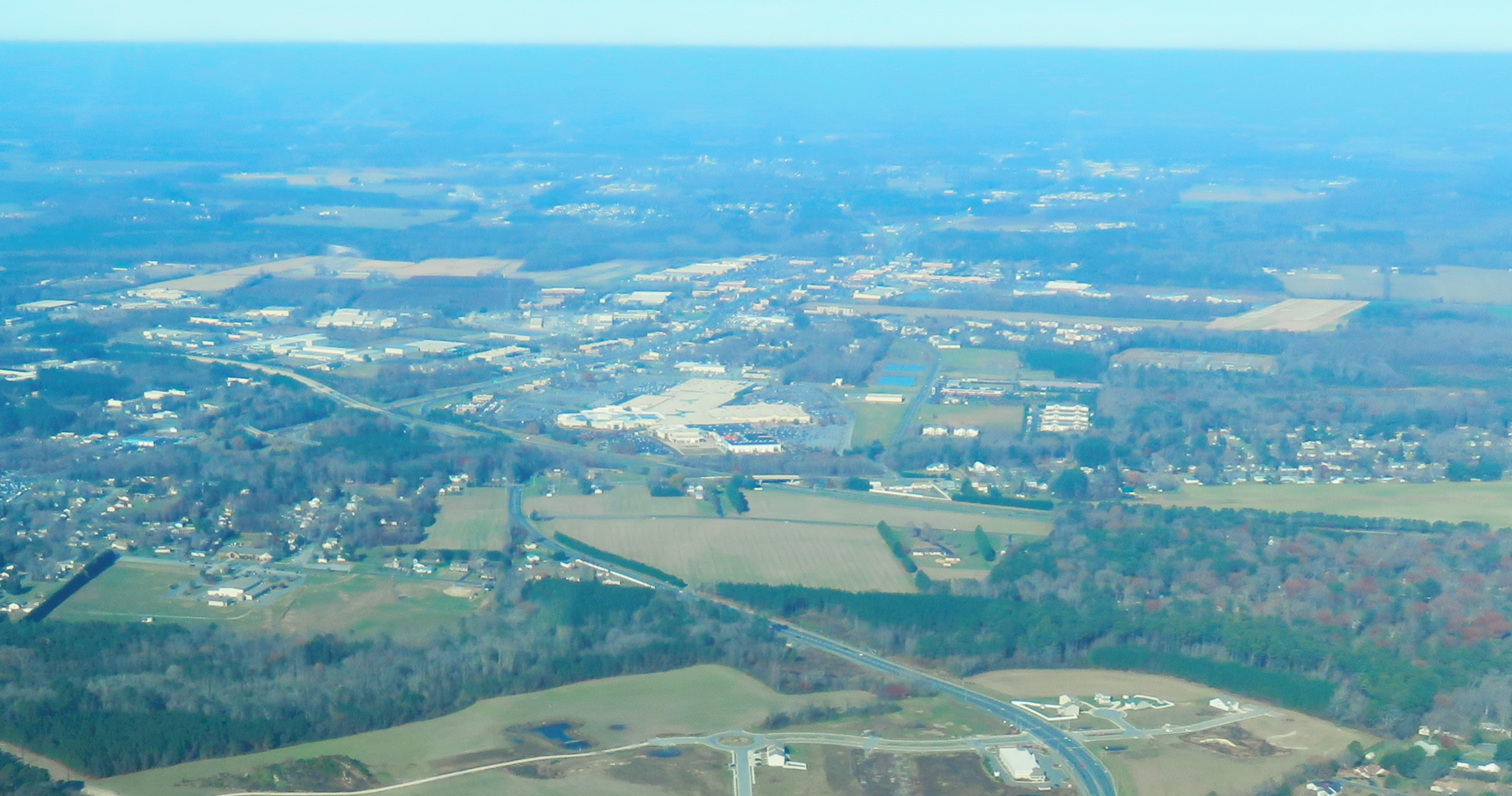
Salisbury, Maryland in 2015

According to the US Conference of Mayors, the Salisbury MD-DE Metropolitan Statistical Area had the 7th fastest rate of job growth in the nation in 2016, with a 4.2% increase in employment.

Perdue Farms, a multi-national poultry corporation, is headquartered in Salisbury. Other industries in Salisbury include healthcare, accommodation and foodservice, electronic component manufacturing, pharmaceuticals, shipbuilding, and agriculture.

Some of the major employers in Salisbury include: Salisbury University, Verizon, Peninsula Regional Medical Center, The Knowland Group, Handy Seafood and Pepsi Bottling of Delmarva. Peninsula Regional Medical Center employs more Salisbury residents than any other company, while Perdue Farms is the largest employer headquartered in Salisbury (with nearly 22,000 employees). The labor market for Wicomico County is 45,033 and for the lower shore three counties a total of 86,798 (as of May 2017).

Piedmont Airlines, a regional airline, is headquartered in unincorporated Wicomico County, on the grounds of Salisbury-Ocean City Wicomico Regional Airport near Salisbury.

== Education ==
Public schools are under the jurisdiction of Wicomico County Public Schools. Several private institutions maintain academic programs within the city.

Post secondary:
Public: Salisbury University and Wor-Wic Community College

Secondary:
Public: James M. Bennett High School, Parkside High School, Wicomico High School, Salisbury Middle School, Wicomico Middle School, and Bennett Middle School
Private: Faith Baptist School, Salisbury Baptist Academy, St. Francis de Sales, Salisbury Christian School, Stepping Stones Learning Academy, The Salisbury School, and Wicomico Day School

Elementary:
Public: Chipman, East Salisbury, Glen Avenue, North Salisbury, Pemberton, Pinehurst, Prince Street, West Salisbury, and Westside Intermediate
Private: Faith Baptist School, Salisbury Christian School, St. Francis de Sales, Stepping Stones Learning Academy, The Salisbury School, and Wicomico Day School

Libraries:

Some of the libraries in Salisbury are branches of the Wicomico Public Library. The Paul S. Sarbanes branch, the largest branch in the system, is located in downtown Salisbury.

== Media ==
=== Periodicals ===
- The Daily Times
- Salisbury Independent – weekly publication of Independent Newsmedia Inc.
- The Metropolitan Magazine – monthly magazine
- Wicomico Weekly – weekly publication of the Daily Times

=== Radio ===
- WGBZ – 88.3 FM – Christian contemporary
- W206AY – 89.1 FM – Religious
- W282AW – 104.3 FM – Classic hits
- WSCL – 89.5 FM – National Public Radio, Classical
- W204AY – 89.9 FM – Religious
- WDIH – 90.3 FM – Religious
- WESM – 91.3 FM – Jazz
- W220CT – 91.9 FM – Christian contemporary
- WNKZ-FM – 92.5 FM – Christian contemporary
- WZBH – 93.5 FM – Rock
- WKDB – 95.3 FM – Adult contemporary
- WKZP – 95.9 FM – Top 40
- WXSU – 96.3 FM – College
- WAVD – 97.1 FM – Classic hits
- WKTT – 97.5 FM – Hip-Hop
- WUSX – 98.5 FM – Country
- WSBY – 98.9 FM – Urban adult contemporary
- WWFG – 99.9 FM – Country
- WRBY-LP – 100.5 FM – multi-categorical broadcasting in Haitian Creole
- WICO-FM – 101.1 FM Classic country
- WJKI-FM – 103.5 FM – Classic rock
- WCEM-FM – 103.9 FM – Country
- WQHQ – 104.7 FM – Adult contemporary
- W286AX – 105.1 FM – Christian contemporary
- WLDW – 105.5 FM – Gospel/Christian
- WGBG-FM – 107.7 FM – Classic rock
- WTGM – 960 AM – Sports
- WJKI – 1320 AM – Classic rock
- WJDY – 1470 AM – Fox Sports Radio

=== Television ===
- WBOC Channel 16, DT 16.1 CBS
- WBOC-DT2 (Fox 21 Delmarva) DT 21.2 Fox
- WBOC-LD (Telemundo Delmarva) Channel 42, DT 42.1/42.2 Telemundo
- WRDE-LD Channel 31, DT 31.1 NBC
- WRDE-LD2 (MyCoziTV) DT 31.2 MyNetworkTV & Cozi TV
- WMDT Channel 47, DT 47.1 ABC
- WMDT-DT2 (The CW 3 Delmarva) DT 47.2 The CW
- WMDT-DT3 (MeTV) DT 47.3 MeTV
- WGDV-LD (Azteca América) Channel 32, DT 32.1
- WCPB Channel 28, DT 58.1 & 58.2 PBS—additional subchannels 58.3–58.5
- PAC 14 Public, Educational, and Government Access Television Channel 4 or 1070 (Comcast)

== Culture ==
Museums and other historic facilities include: Salisbury University Arboretum, Salisbury Zoo, Museum of Eastern Shore Culture (formerly the Ward Museum of Wildfowl Art), Edward H. Nabb Center for Delmarva History and Culture, Chipman Cultural Center, and Poplar Hill Mansion.

=== Parks, playgrounds, and community centers ===
The City, with input from its Parks and Recreation Committee, maintains numerous parks including Comfort Safety Zone Playground, Doverdale Park and Playground, Elizabeth W. Woodcock Park and Playground, Jeannete P. Chipman Boundless Playground (fully handicapped accessible), Lake Street Park and Playground, Newtown Park, Newtown – Camden Tot Lot Playground, Riverwalk Park, Salisbury City Park and Zoo, Waterside Park, and Naylor Mill Forest Trail. Naylor Mill Forest Trail, at over 92 acres, contains the largest conservation easement inside a municipality, in the State of Maryland. Additionally, the Port of Salisbury Marina is located near downtown Salisbury, in the Marina District. The community manages three Community Gardens, located in Waterside Park, Newton-Camden Tot Lot Playground, and Jeannete P. Chipman Boundless Playground.

Wicomico County Public Schools maintains recreational fields and courts at each of the county schools. The county also maintains other parks in the Salisbury area: Billy Gene Jackson Sr. Park, Coulbourn Mill Pond Park, Crooked Oak Playground, Indian Village Playground, Leonards Mill Park, Pemberton Historical Park, Schumaker Park, and Winterplace Park.

The City operates two community centers, the Truitt Street Community Center and the Copeland House at Newton Community Center. These centers provide recreational opportunities in addition to arts & crafts, poetry & creative writing, music, and homework assistance for youth and continuing education courses for adults through a partnership with Wor-Wic Community College.

=== Sports ===
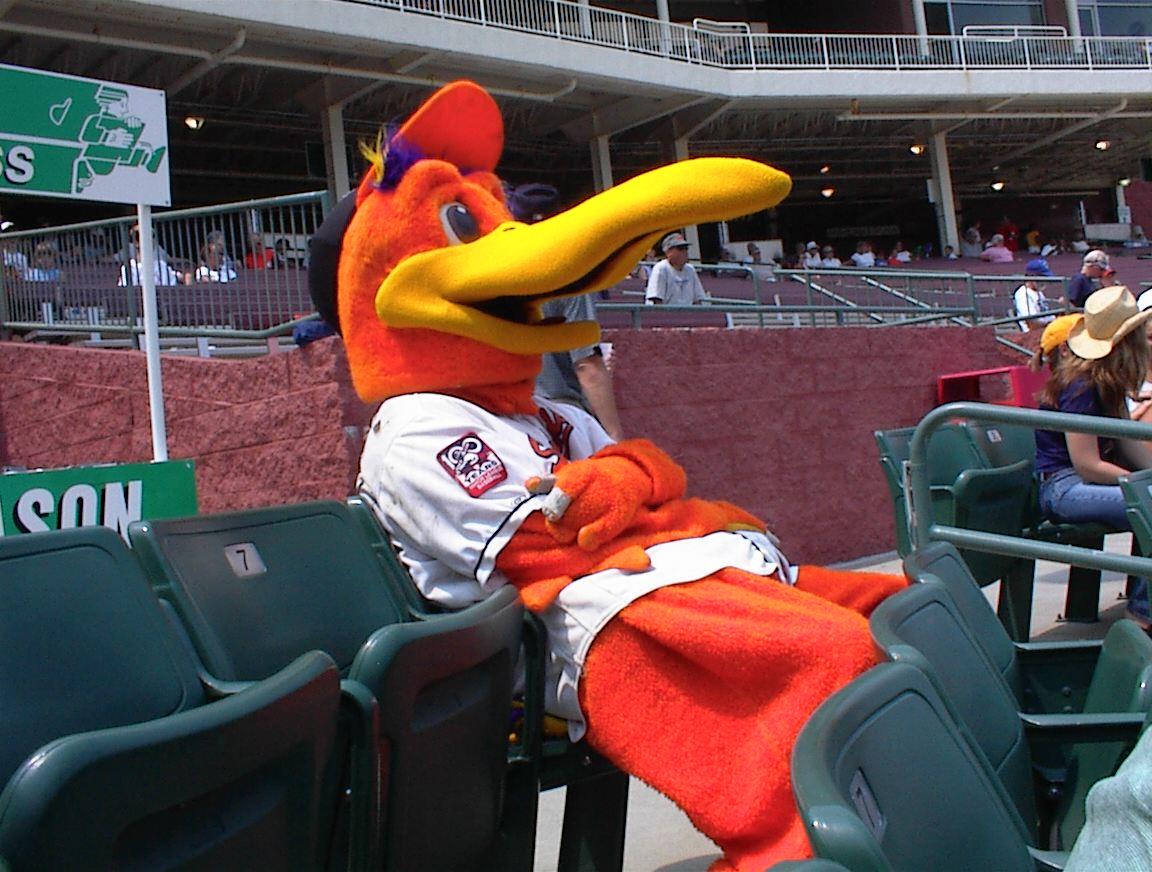
Delmarva Shorebirds' mascot, Sherman, in the seats of Perdue Stadium.

The Eastern Shore Baseball League was headquartered in Salisbury; two franchises, the Salisbury Cardinals and the Salisbury Indians, called the city home. Today, the Delmarva Shorebirds represent the town in the Carolina League. The Eastern Shore Baseball Hall of Fame is housed at the Arthur W. Perdue Stadium. The Shorebirds are a Single-A Affiliate of the Baltimore Orioles.

Salisbury also is home to Division 3 Salisbury Sea Gulls. The Seagulls have been dominant in football, field hockey, baseball, Men's Rugby and lacrosse, including multiple NCAA lacrosse national titles. Seagull Stadium hosts the university's football team while Maggs Gymnasium hosts basketball.

Salisbury also has the Wicomico Stallions, a minor league football team; the Salisbury Rollergirls, an all-female, competitive, WFTDA-member, flat-track roller derby league; Doverdale Youth Lacrosse; the Salisbury Rhinos Youth Football; and many programs through the county's Recreation and Parks department.

=== Events ===
- Maryland Folk Festival – Began as the National Folk Festival, which was hosted in Salisbury in 2018, 2019, 2021 and 2022. The City continued the festival as the Maryland Folk Festival, beginning in 2023.
- SBY Marathon – A marathon, half-marathon, and 5K held in Salisbury. The marathon is a qualifier for the Boston and New York City Marathons.
- Sea Gull Century – Cycle 62 mi (100 km) or 100 mi (160 km) of Maryland's Eastern Shore each October (hosted by Salisbury University).
- Dance for Kindness – Freeze mob/flash mob held in downtown Salisbury each Sunday prior to World Kindness Day. Celebrating kindSBY and Salisbury's designation as USA's first World Kindness USA City by the World Kindness Movement.

== Organizations ==
Community participation through various groups fosters friendliness and betterment. Organizations that sponsor events within the city include: Salisbury Area Chamber of Commerce, The Salisbury Junior Chamber of Commerce (aka Salisbury Jaycees), Junior Achievement of the Eastern Shore, Community Foundation of the Eastern Shore, Salisbury Symphony Orchestra, Salisbury Community Band, Community Players of Salisbury, and the Peace Alliance of the Lower Shore. Several churches within the community also boast impressive musical programs, notably Wicomico Presbyterian Church and Asbury United Methodist Church. Salisbury also contains a number of scout troops, chartered at organizations across the city.

== Sister cities ==
Salisbury's sister cities are:

- Salinas, Ecuador
- Salisbury, England, United Kingdom
- Tartu, Estonia

== Transportation ==
Salisbury is served by two major highways—U.S. Route 13, one of the major north–south routes of the Delmarva Peninsula, and U.S. Route 50, one of the major east–west routes on the peninsula. US 13 connects Salisbury to Dover, Delaware and Norfolk, Virginia and is known as the Ocean Highway, while US 50 serves as the main route between the Baltimore/Washington region and many of the major cities on Delmarva, including Ocean City; it is known as the Ocean Gateway. US 13 and US 50 originally passed through the central business district, but have been subsequently rerouted onto the Salisbury Bypass, a 3/4 beltway around the city that allows through traffic on US 13 and US 50 to bypass the downtown area; earlier routes of both highways are now U.S. Route 13 Business and U.S. Route 50 Business. Earlier still, US 13 was routed along Division Street and US 50 along Main Street.

The city is also served by Maryland Route 12, a rural highway that connects Salisbury to the town of Snow Hill, and Maryland Route 349, a rural highway that connects Salisbury to Nanticoke and Quantico.

The Delmarva Central Railroad provides freight rail service to Salisbury.

The city is served by daily scheduled American Eagle service to both Philadelphia, Pennsylvania and Charlotte, North Carolina at the Wicomico Regional Airport. Additionally, the Port of Salisbury offers respite for recreational boaters and commercial tug boats. Salisbury's navigable stop on the Wicomico River is the second largest and second busiest commercial port in Maryland.

The city is also served by Shore Transit, which provides local bus service throughout the city, and also services points outside the city within the tri-county area, such as Ocean City's public transportation system. The major transfer point is on Calvert Street, in downtown Salisbury.

Greyhound Lines provides intercity bus service to Salisbury from a bus stop at the Shore Transit Tri-County facility. From this stop, direct service is provided to various locations including the Port Authority Bus Terminal in New York City, Wilmington, Delaware, the Baltimore Greyhound Terminal in Baltimore, Norfolk, Virginia, and Richmond, Virginia. BayRunner Shuttle offers shuttle service from the Baltimore-Washington International Airport and the BWI Rail Station to Salisbury. Amtrak Thruway service is available via the BayRunner Shuttle to the BWI Rail Station.

== Notable people ==
- Alex Azar, former secretary of the United States Department of Health and Human Services
- James Cannon Jr., bishop for the Methodist Episcopal Church
- Norman Conway, Maryland state delegate from 1987 to 2014
- Alexis Denisof, actor
- John Glover, actor
- Fernando Guerrero, professional boxer
- Linda Hamilton, actress
- John Woodland Hastings, expert in bioluminescence
- Bruce Howard, MLB pitcher
- William Humphreys Jackson, Congressman from 1901 to 1905 and 1907–1909
- William Purnell Jackson, Maryland Congressman from 1912 to 1914, State Treasurer 1918–1920
- Reid Klopp, professional soccer player
- Ogden Nash, author and poet
- Frank Perdue, businessman
- Jessica Lee Rose, actor
- Paul Sarbanes, Maryland's second longest-serving U.S. Senator, retired 2007
- Mike Seidel, meteorologist at The Weather Channel from 1992 to 2024
- Kevin Shaffer, NFL football player
- Matthew Williams, victim of racial violence
- Darnell Savage Jr., NFL football player
