= Solar power in Maryland =

Overview of solar power in the U.S. state of Maryland

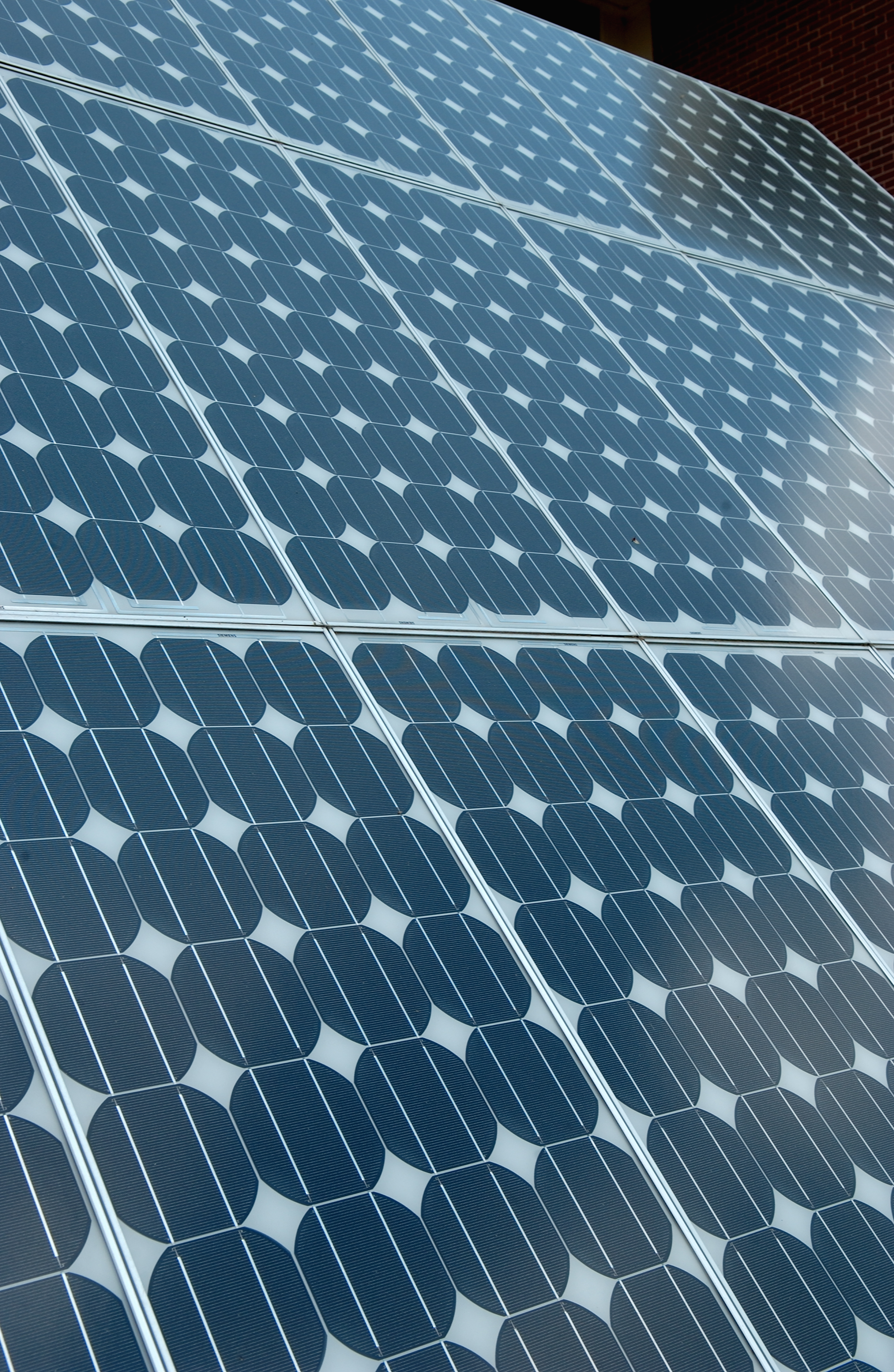
Solar panels

Solar power in Maryland is supported by the state's legislation regarding the Renewable Portfolio Standard and Solar Renewable Energy Credit (SREC) program. The target for renewable energy as of 2017 was 20% by 2020, including 2% from solar power.

According to the Maryland Energy Administration, Maryland is exposed to approximately 5.3kWh per square meter of solar energy on a daily basis, and as of 2016, the state had 508 MW installed which ranks Maryland 11th in the nation for installed solar capacity.

== State and local incentives ==
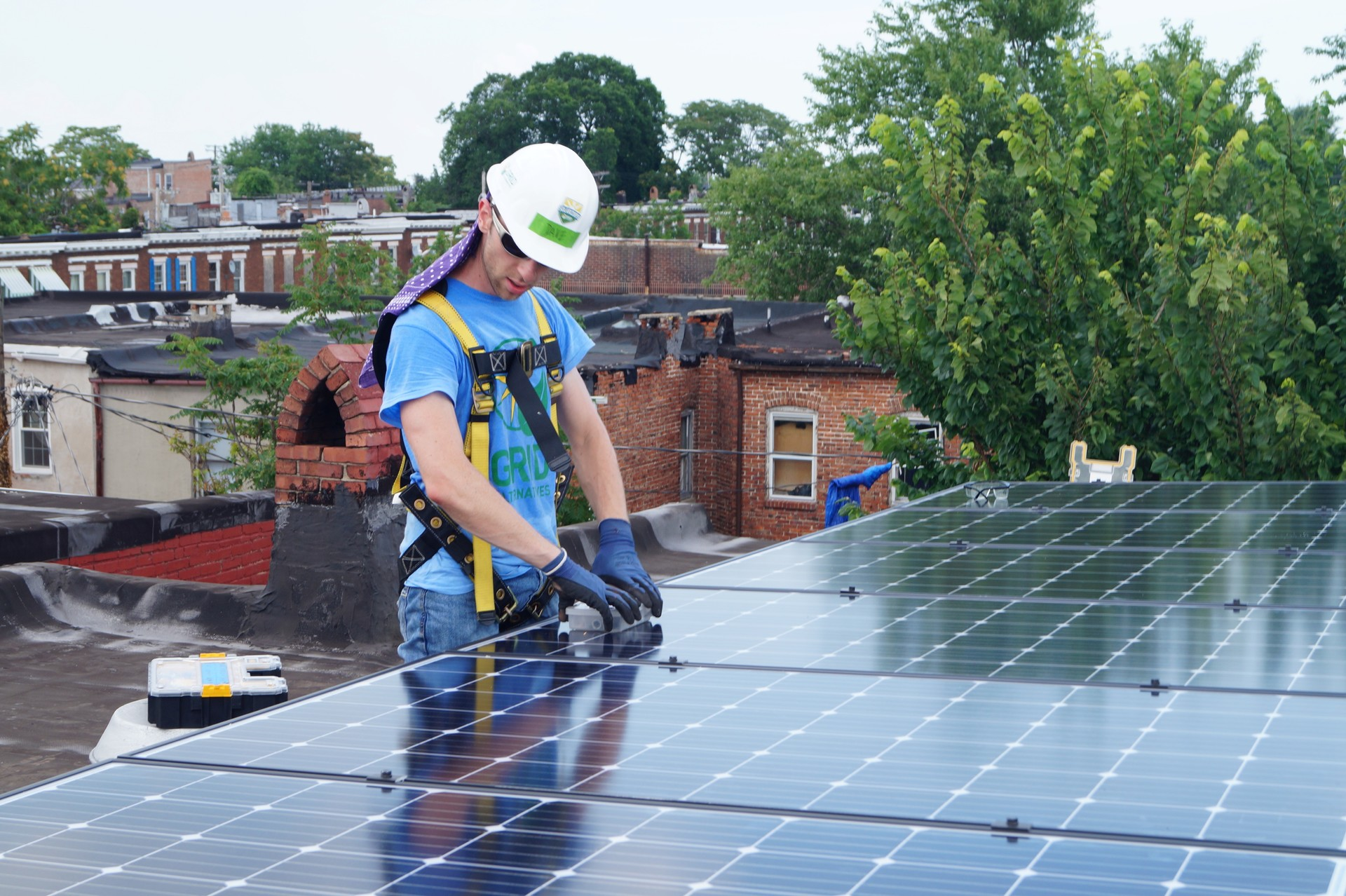
Solar panel installation, Baltimore

Various tax credits are available for Maryland solar power system installations. As of January 2017, the vast majority of county property tax credits have expired. A full list of remaining tax credits is available from DSIRE. The Maryland Energy Administration offers a $1000 grant for residential PV systems between 2 and 20 kW of DC power at STC and $500 for solar hot water (solar thermal). Commercial installations are granted $60/kW (max. 100 kW) for solar panels and $20/square foot (max. 250 square feet) for solar thermal systems.

== Net metering ==
Consumer net metering and SRECs are available in the state of Maryland for owners of both solar PV systems and, as of the May 22, 2012 signing of S.B. 791, solar hot water systems. Solar hot water systems have a 5 SREC limit. The passage of H.B. 1187, also on May 22, 2012, accelerated the state's Renewable Energy Portfolio Standard with a target of 20% by 2020, of which 2% must be solar. Currently, there is no limit on the system size for a photovoltaic system.

In the state of Maryland, one SREC is equal to one MWh of electricity production, and is redeemable for three years. As of January 2017, an SREC is valued at $18, and if the RPS is not increased is expected to further decline as the solar/renewable energy further saturates the electricity supply. In addition, solar thermal that is installed for recreational purposes, such as heating a swimming pool, is not eligible for incentives.

== Legislation ==
Bill	Date enacted	Summary
S.B. 791/H.B. 1187	May 22, 2012	Accelerated renewable energy goals by two years
H.B. 258	April 10, 2012	Changed minimum 15-year contract for SREC sale between solar generator and energy supplier to apply to generators greater than 10 kW only
S.B. 717	May 19, 2011	Solar thermal systems installed after June 1, 2011 eligible for SREC generation

== Economic impact ==
Maryland's goals for the Renewable Portfolio Standard have led to various monetary incentives, and to the expansion of local companies offering solar panel installation and services. Additionally, Governor Martin O'Malley stated that he aims to add 100,000 local green jobs by 2015. There are currently at least 183 companies in Maryland involved in installing, distributing, designing or selling solar systems.

== Impact on farmland ==
By 2016, citizens had raised concerns about plans to build solar farms on prime farmland in Washington County, and on the Eastern Shore, in Kent County and Talbot County.

== Statistics ==
=== Installed capacity ===
Source: NREL

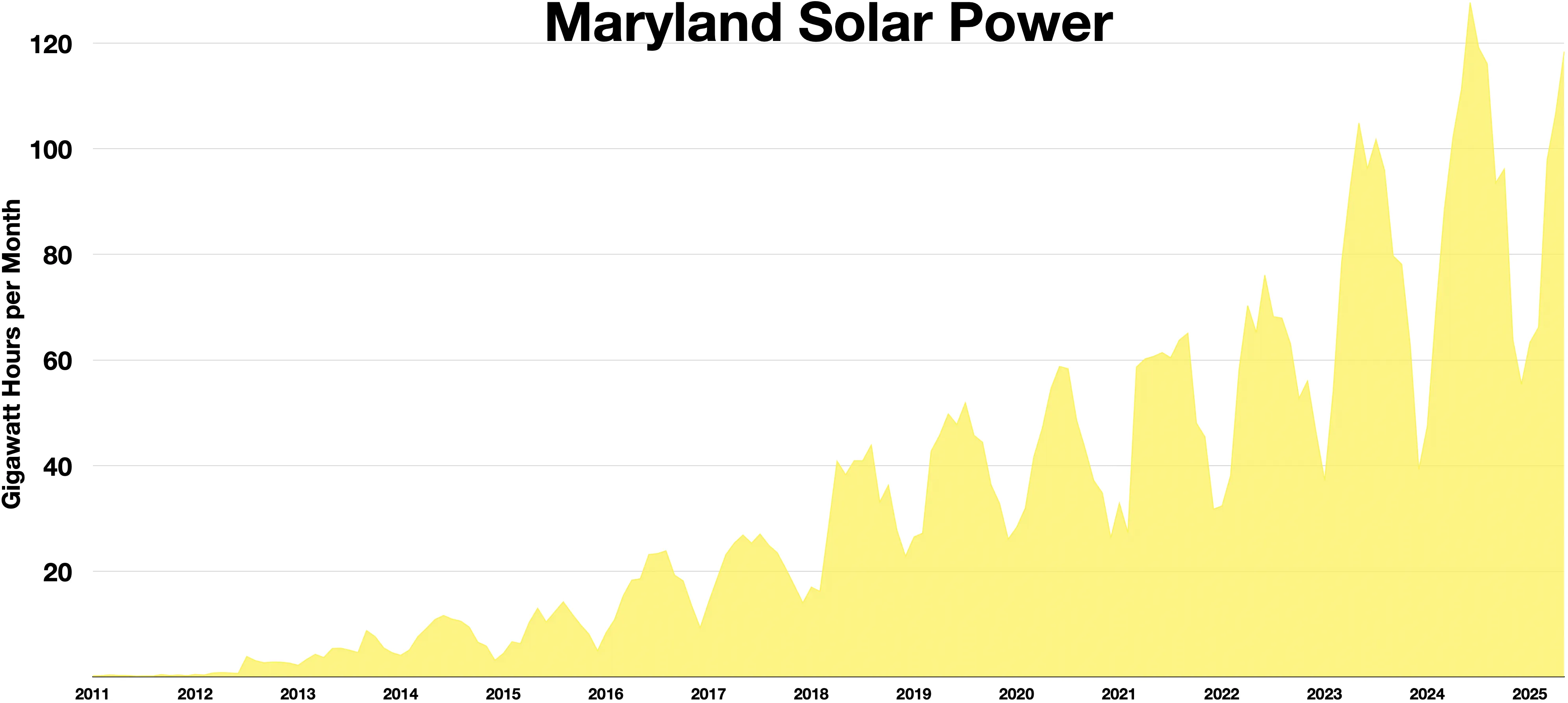
Maryland solar power

Grid-connected PV capacity (MW)
Year	Capacity	Installed	% change
2007	0.9	0.3	50%
2008	2.8	1.9	211%
2009	7.5	4.7	168%
2010	12.8	5.3	71%
2011	37.1	24.3	190%
2012	116.8	79.7	215%
2013	175.4	58.7	50%
2014	205	30	17%
2015	349	144	70%
2016	645	296	84.8%
2017	888	243	37.6%
2018	1,011	123	13.8%
2019	1,202.8	191.8	18.9%
2020	1,288.7	85.9	7.1%
2021	1,426.5	137.8	%
2022	1,670	243.5	%

A 5.5-MW solar farm near Hughesville generates enough power for 600 homes, and offsets the pollution of 1,600 cars.

A 4.3 MW solar farm in Cambridge supplies about 40% of the power for the National Aquarium in Baltimore, and saves about 1,300 metric tons of carbon dioxide during the summer.

=== Utility-scale generation ===
Utility-scale solar generation in Maryland (GWh)
Year	Total	Jan	Feb	Mar	Apr	May	Jun	Jul	Aug	Sep	Oct	Nov	Dec
2012	23	0	0	1	1	1	1	4	3	3	3	3	3
2013	65	2	4	5	4	6	6	5	5	9	8	6	5
2014	97	4	5	8	9	11	12	11	11	10	7	6	3
2015	119	5	7	7	11	14	11	13	15	13	10	8	5
2016	210	9	11	16	19	19	24	24	25	20	19	14	10
2017	269	15	19	24	26	28	26	28	26	24	21	18	14
2018	396	18	17	29	42	39	42	42	45	34	37	28	23
2019	492	27	28	44	47	51	49	54	47	46	38	34	27
2020	527	29	33	43	49	56	61	60	50	45	38	36	27
2021	631	34	28	60	62	62	63	62	65	67	49	47	32
2022	712	33	39	60	72	67	78	70	70	65	54	57	47
2023	967	45	55	78	89	105	103	111	104	87	81	63	46

== Major solar companies in Maryland ==
Maryland has a diverse mix of both regional solar installers and most of the national installers. Many specialize in specific types of transactions, such as large scale commercial projects or residential leased system. There are an estimated 183 companies in Maryland involved in solar.

- American Sentry Solar
- Chaberton Energy
- Direct Energy Solar
- Maryland State Solar
- Solar Energy World
- Solarcity
- Standard Solar
- Trinity Solar
- Vivint

== See also ==
- Wind power in Maryland
- Solar power in the United States
- Renewable energy in the United States
- Choosing a solar company in Maryland
- Maryland solar statistics
