= Salisbury Zoo =

- Salisbury Zoo logo

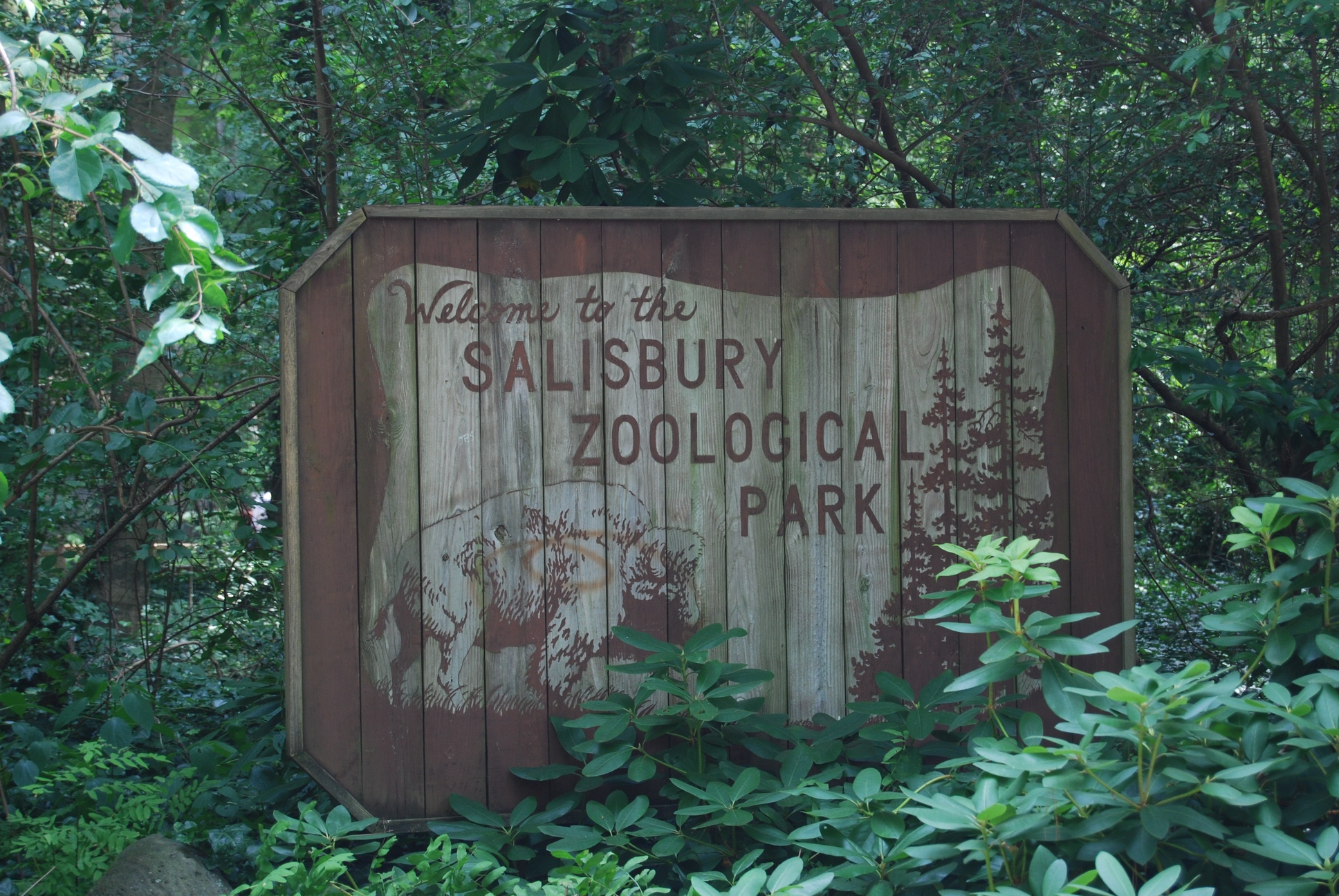
- Sign entering the Salisbury Zoo
- Interactive map of Salisbury Zoo
- 38.3610°N 75.5828°W
- Date opened: 1954
- Location: Salisbury, Maryland, United States
- Land area: 12 acres (4.9 ha)
- No. of animals: 100+
- Annual visitors: 300,000+
- Owner: City of Salisbury; Salisbury Zoo Commission
- Website: www.salisburyzoo.org

The Salisbury Zoological Park, commonly referred to as the Salisbury Zoo, is a 12-acre (4.9 ha) zoo located on the Delmarva Peninsula in the Salisbury, Maryland city park. The Salisbury Zoo chooses to mainly house species native to North America, South America, and Australia. Its collection of over 100 animals includes wallabies, flamingos, bison, an ocelot, a red wolf, two-toed sloths, alpacas, turtles, macaws, rescued birds of prey and owls. Admission at the Salisbury Zoo is free.

== History ==
The zoo was founded in 1954, with the placement of some animals on permanent display, in the city park. Improvements made in the 1970s focused on providing more naturalistic enclosures for the zoo's animals.

The zoo is currently run by a nine (9)-member Salisbury Zoo Commission; appointed by the mayor of Salisbury, and confirmed by the city council, the zoo is funded predominantly by this commission, as well as the City of Salisbury, and the nonprofit group, the Delmarva Zoological Society.

The Zoo raised nearly $3 million in a joint campaign for an animal health clinic, a new Environmental Center, and a new exhibit of Australian animals. In 2020, the zoo lost its accreditation with the Association of Zoos and Aquariums. As of 2024, it planned improvements in the facility to regain the accreditation.

== Andean bears ==
The Salisbury Zoo has been home to Andean (or spectacled) bears since the 1970s. These bears are the only bear species endemic to South America. One of the first bears in the zoo's collection, Poopsie, later gained popularity for becoming the oldest Andean bear in captivity, reaching 37 years of age prior to her death in 2011.

The zoo was also home to Andean bear Gritto, born July 28, 1991. He would go on to be the oldest Andean bear to become a father, at the age of 22, when he sired a female cub named Alba, born January 23, 2015. Gritto was put to sleep on October 15, 2015, at 24 years of age, after suffering from a stroke.

Chaska, Alba's mom, gave birth to another cub, Sinchi, on January 11, 2020. The father was Pinocchio, who came to the Salisbury Zoo from Ecuador. Chaska had two more cubs with Pinocchio, Inti and Raymi, on January 16, 2022.

Upon Chaska's move to the Alexandria Zoo in May 2025, all of Salisbury's Andean bears had been moved to new facilities, paving the way for the construction of a new, larger Andean bear exhibit. The exhibit will include three yards, with room for one male and three female bears, and will meet AZA standards.
