= TidalHealth Peninsula Regional =

- TidalHealth

Geography
- Location: 100 East Carroll Street, Salisbury, Maryland, United States
- Coordinates: 38°21′43″N 75°35′54″W

Organization
- Type: District General
- Affiliated university: Johns Hopkins University

Services
- Emergency department: Level III trauma center
- Beds: 266

Helipads
- Helipad: Yes

History
- Founded: 1898

Links
- Website: mytidalhealth.org
- Lists: Hospitals in Maryland

TidalHealth Peninsula Regional is a non-profit hospital located in Salisbury, Maryland.

Established in 1897 by Dr. George W. Todd with six beds in an old home, the institution once known as Peninsula General Hospital has grown to contain approximately 300 beds. It serves nearly 500,000 patients every year in a multitude of specialties. Close to 2,000 babies are born at TidalHealth Peninsula Regional every year. There are approximately 3,300 employees, placing it among Salisbury's largest employers.

Outside of its main hospital location, it includes a network of specialty and family physicians, a network of labs and pharmacies, plus two health complexes in Millsboro, Delaware and Ocean Pines, Maryland.

Steven Leonard has been president and CEO since January 2018.

In January 2020, Peninsula Health System, parent of the then named Peninsula Regional Medical Center, merged with Nanticoke Health Services of Seaford, Delaware. On September 1, 2020, the health system was officially renamed TidalHealth Services. The renaming coincided with a rebranding of all affiliated institutions with the TidalHealth branding.

== Medical specialties ==
Specialties include

- Comprehensive Cardiac Care (including Open Heart Surgery and Rehab) at the Guerrieri Heart & Vascular Institute
- Comprehensive Cancer Treatment at the Richard A. Henson Cancer Institute
- Diagnostic and Imaging Services
- Emergency and Trauma Care
- Outpatient Surgical Services
- Neurosurgery
- Orthopaedics (including total joint replacement) and Rehabilitation
- Breast Center
- Special Care Nursery
- Heartburn Treatment Center
- Sleep Center
- Women's and Children's Services
- Wound Care
- Outpatient Physical, Occupational and Speech Therapy & Rehabilitation
- Pediatric and neonatal services, provided in collaboration with Children's National Medical Center
- Psychiatric Services, in partnership with Adventist HealthCare
- Access to Clinical Trials (Peninsula Regional is part of the Johns Hopkins Clinical Research Network)

== Accreditation ==
TidalHealth Peninsula Regional is an accredited Hospital and Laboratory by the Joint Commission. Its Joint Commission certifications include Advanced Total Hip and Total Knee Replacement,

Primary Stroke Center, Acute Myocardial Infarction, and Spine Surgery.
