= WKZP =

Radio station in West Ocean City, Maryland

Coordinates: 38.422°N 75.139°W

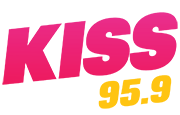
- West Ocean City, Maryland; United States
- Broadcast area: Salisbury–Ocean City, Maryland and Sussex County, Delaware
- Frequency: 95.9 MHz
- Branding: KISS 95-9

Programming
- Format: Top 40 (CHR)
- Affiliations: Premiere Networks

Ownership
- Owner: iHeartMedia, Inc.; (iHM Licenses, LLC)
- Sister stations: WJDY, WQHQ, WSBY-FM, WTGM, WWFG

History
- First air date: June 20, 1974; 52 years ago
- Former call signs: WWTR-FM (1974–1993); WKHI (1993–1994); WWVV (1994); WOSC (1994–2011)
- Call sign meaning: "Kiss"

Technical information
- Licensing authority: FCC
- Facility ID: 4674
- Class: B1
- ERP: 10,500 watts
- HAAT: 143 meters (469 ft)

Links
- Public license information: Public file; LMS
- Webcast: Listen Live
- Website: kiss959fm.iheart.com

WKZP (95.9 FM) is a radio station serving Salisbury and Ocean City, Maryland, as well as Sussex County, Delaware. The station, known as "KISS 95-9," is licensed to West Ocean City, Maryland. The station is owned by iHeartMedia, Inc.

WKZP programs a rhythmic-leaning top 40 (CHR) format. It has previously been known as 95.9 THE SPORTS ANIMAL with a sports format, 96ROCK with an active rock format, 95.9 The Coast with a modern rock format, and originally as Stereo 96, WWTR-FM.

== History ==
95.9 WWTR-FM signed on the air on June 20, 1974 as an adult contemporary/oldies station owned by J. Parker Connor of Connor Broadcasting. The studios were located on the second floor of the now Connor Anthony Jacobson Realty Building at the intersection of North Pennsylvania Avenue and Campbell Place in Bethany Beach, Delaware. The owner's son Brad Connor served as a disc jockey as early as age 15, later progressing to sales and eventually management of the radio station. He is currently the mayor of Dagsboro, Delaware.

In May 1981, the station was sold to Coastal Communications-Delaware Corporation for $1 million. The new owners changed to the Burkhart/Abrahams Superstars 1 Album Oriented Rock format four months later in September 1981 as "96 Rock - Delmarva's only Rock 'N Roll."

In early 1993 this station was sold to Benchmark Communications along with top-40 station WKHI from Ocean City, Maryland. Benchmark moved the top-40 programming and WKHI call letters down the dial to 95.9 FM to make room for the debut of Froggy 99.9 at 99.9 FM. 96 Rock disappeared from the airwaves of Delmarva Radio.

In September 2000 the station was sold to Clear Channel Communications. Two months later, the station added Don and Mike to afternoons.

WOSC is the former home of Mancow's Morning Madhouse which aired from 1999-2003. After dropping Mancow, the station added Elliot in the Morning (from sister station DC101) for a year. The stations once again changed its slogan, to "96 Rock, Elliot in the Morning and Don and Mike in the Afternoon." WOSC later decided to promote longtime air personality Jon "Whiskey" Wilson to the morning shift. Whiskey in the Morning lasted 15 months until September 2005. Then, WOSC decided to put Don and Mike on in the morning (tape delayed from the day before) and put Whiskey on in the afternoon.

In February 2006, General manager Frank Hamilton hired Cowboy (former Morning Show co-Host at WZBH), and paired him with Whiskey in the afternoon. The show was successful and by September 2006 the station moved Whiskey and Cowboy to mornings, and Don and Mike back to afternoons live. The lineup stayed intact until mid-December 2006, when Cowboy retired from radio. The show returned in January 2007 as "Whiskey in the Morning" with JJ as co-host, and was renamed "Whiskey in the Morning with JJ" in April 2008.

In September 2007, the owners moved "Don and Mike" to sister station Sportstalk 960 AM.

On April 28, 2009, the Clear Channel national layoffs hit WOSC, leaving JJ Roth, morning show co-host, and Afternoon Jock/PD Rich Drake without jobs. Whiskey was moved into the Afternoon slot, with the syndicated Lex and Terry in the morning. JJ is now the PD and Midday host at WOCM-FM, and Rich Drake is the Afternoon Drive DJ/PD on WBEY/Bay Country 97.9.

On April 1, 2010, WOSC changed their format to sports, branded as "The Sports Animal". The station carried ESPN Radio programming with Whiskey teaming up with PD Randy Scott in the afternoon.

In late February 2011, Clear Channel moved Kiss from 105.5 to 95.9 as "Kiss 95-9" (Top 40/CHR). The Sports Animal was moved to 960 AM/WTGM, which was later changed to Fox Sports 960 AM in 2014. Whiskey and Randy have since been moved to mornings on sister country station WWFG/Froggy 99.9.
