= WWFG =

Radio station in Ocean City, Maryland

- Ocean City, Maryland; United States
- Broadcast area: Salisbury-Ocean City
- Frequency: 99.9 MHz
- Branding: Froggy 99-9

Programming
- Format: Country
- Affiliations: Premiere Networks

Ownership
- Owner: iHeartMedia, Inc.; (iHM Licenses, LLC)
- Sister stations: WQHQ, WJDY, WKZP, WTGM, WSBY-FM

History
- First air date: June 30, 1978
- Former call signs: WKHI (1978–1993)
- Call sign meaning: WW FroGgy

Technical information
- Licensing authority: FCC
- Facility ID: 74179
- Class: B
- ERP: 38,000 watts
- HAAT: 143.0 meters (469.2 ft)
- Transmitter coordinates: 38°25′20.00″N 75°8′23.00″W

Links
- Public license information: Public file; LMS
- Webcast: Listen Live
- Website: froggy999.iheart.com

WWFG (99.9 FM) is a radio station broadcasting a country format. Licensed to Ocean City, Maryland, United States, the station is currently owned by iHeartMedia, Inc.

== History ==
Up until 1993, this station had the call letters WKHI and featured a CHR/Top 40 format. The station was once called "100 KHI" even though it broadcast at 99.9 FM. As digital tuners became more popular, it eventually changed its name to "The New Power 99.9 KHI". By 1989 the station was calling itself Power 99.9. A year or 2 later, it changed names again to Mix 99.9.

Then in early 1993, this station was sold to Benchmark Communications along with 95.9 FM, which was licensed to Bethany Beach, Delaware. Benchmark moved the WKHI call letters and CHR/Top 40 programming down the dial to 95.9 FM and debuted WWFG "Froggy 99-9" on 99.9 FM.

During the early days of Froggy 99-9 the disc jockeys were all known by cute "frog" names such as "Jimmy Hoppa", "Ann Phibian," "Jackson Leap," and "C.R. Fishhook."

Froggy 99.9 currently features The Whiskey & Randy Morning Show, hosted by local residents Jon "Whiskey" Wilson and Randy Scott.
