= Athletics at the 2015 CPISRA World Games =

- Venue: Harvey Hadden Stadium
- Location: Nottingham, England
- Dates: 13 – 15 August

Athletics at the 2015 CPISRA World Games were held during the last 3 days of the games, from 13 to 15 August 2015, at the Harvey Hadden Stadium. The sport of athletics in the 2015 CPISRA World Games was split into three distinct sets of events: track and field events and Racerunning events.

== Overview ==
Track and field	F31		F32		F33/T33		F34/T34		F35/T35		F36/T36		F37/T37		F38/T38	
100m					Male	Female	Male	N/A	Male	Female	Male	Female	Male	Female	Male	Female
200m					N/A	Female	Male	N/A	Male	Female	Male	Female	Male	Female	Male	Female
400m					N/A	Female	Male	N/A	Male	Female	Male	N/A	Male	Female	Male	N/A
800m					N/A	Female	Male	N/A	Male	N/A	N/A	Female	Male	N/A	Male	N/A
3000m											N/A	Female	N/A	N/A	Male	N/A
5000m											N/A	N/A	N/A	N/A	Male	N/A
4 × 100					Male - Female											
Club throw / Javelin throw	Male	N/A	Male	Female	Male	Female	Male	N/A	N/A	Female	Male	Female	Male	Female	Male	N/A
Discus throw	N/A	N/A	Male	Female	Male	Female	Male	N/A	N/A	Female	Male	Female	Male	Female	Male	Female
Long jump									Male	N/A	Male	Female	Male	Female	Male	Female
Shot put			Male	N/A	Male	Female	Male	N/A	Male	Female	Male	Female	Male	Female	Male	Female

Racerunning	RR1		RR2		RR3	
100m Racerunning	Male	Female	Male	Female	Male	Female
200m Racerunning	Male	Female	Male	Female	Male	Female
400m Racerunning	Male	Female	Male	Female	Male	Female
800m Racerunning	Male	Female	Male	Female	Male	Female

Pentathlon	F38/T38	
100m	N/A	Female
800m	N/A	Female
Discus throw	N/A	Female
Long jump	N/A	Female
Shot put	N/A	Female

== Results ==
=== Seated Discus Female/Male ===
13/08/15 - F1 - 10.15am: F32/33/34 Seated Discus Female/Male

Rank	Weight	Number	FirstName Surname	Classification	Distance	Notes
1st place, gold medalist(s)	1.00 kg	20	(Republic of Ireland) Kate Kelly	F F32	8.29	

Rank	Weight	Number	FirstName Surname	Classification	Distance	Notes
1st place, gold medalist(s)	1.00 kg	30	(England) Samantha Gray	F F33	8.41	

Rank	Weight	Number	FirstName Surname	Classification	Distance	Notes
1st place, gold medalist(s)	1.00 kg	51	(Scotland) Graham Condie	M F32	13.50	
2nd place, silver medalist(s)	1.00 kg	86	(England) Stewart Chappell	M F32	8.35	

Rank	Weight	Number	FirstName Surname	Classification	Distance	Notes
1st place, gold medalist(s)	1.00 kg	42	(Republic of Ireland) Daniel Hanks	M F33	11.72	

Rank	Weight	Number	FirstName Surname	Classification	Distance	Notes
1st place, gold medalist(s)	1.00 kg	85	(Republic of Ireland) Sean Hughes	M F34	17.76	

=== Ambulant Shot Female ===
13/08/15 - F2 - 10.45am: F35/36/37/38 Ambulant Shot Female

Rank	Weight	Number	FirstName Surname	Classification	Distance	Notes
1st place, gold medalist(s)	3.00 kg	7	(England) Anna Nicholson	F F35 Amb	6.67	
2nd place, silver medalist(s)	3.00 kg	11	(Austria) Dagmar Reicht	F F35 Amb	4.05	

Rank	Weight	Number	FirstName Surname	Classification	Distance	Notes
1st place, gold medalist(s)	3.00 kg	26	(England) Mary Wilson	F F36	6.46	

Rank	Weight	Number	FirstName Surname	Classification	Distance	Notes
1st place, gold medalist(s)	3.00 kg	29	(Republic of Ireland) Rachel Power	F F37 Amb	8.02	
2nd place, silver medalist(s)	3.00 kg	10	(Republic of Ireland) Cliona Horan	F F37 Amb	6.12	

Rank	Weight	Number	FirstName Surname	Classification	Distance	Notes
1st place, gold medalist(s)	3.00 kg	2	(England) Amy Wearing	F F38 Amb	7.10	
2nd place, silver medalist(s)	3.00 kg	14	(England) Emily Stewart	F F38 Amb	6.35	

=== Seated Javelin Female/Male ===
13/08/15 - F3 - 2.00pm: F33/34 Seated Javelin Female/Male

Rank	Weight	Number	FirstName Surname	Classification	Distance	Notes
1st place, gold medalist(s)	600g	30	(England) Samantha Gray	F F33 WC	6.70	

Rank	Weight	Number	FirstName Surname	Classification	Distance	Notes
1st place, gold medalist(s)	600g	42	(Republic of Ireland) Daniel Hanks	M F33 WC	9.87	

Rank	Weight	Number	FirstName Surname	Classification	Distance	Notes
1st place, gold medalist(s)	600g	85	(Republic of Ireland) Sean Hughes	M F34 WC	15.33	

=== Ambulant Discus Male ===
13/08/15 - F4 - 2.15pm: F35/36/37/38 Ambulant Discus Male

Rank	Weight	Number	FirstName Surname	Classification	Distance	Notes
1st place, gold medalist(s)	1.00 kg	89	(England) William Baxter	M F36 Amb	31.72	
2nd place, silver medalist(s)	1.00 kg	39	(Austria) Bruno Wechselberger	M F36 Amb	15.75	
3rd place, bronze medalist(s)	1.00 kg	65	(Republic of Ireland) Martin Coleman	M F36	12.05	

Rank	Weight	Number	FirstName Surname	Classification	Distance	Notes
1st place, gold medalist(s)	1.00 kg	81	(England) Rob Page	M F37 Amb	31.11	
2nd place, silver medalist(s)	1.00 kg	44	(England) Dylan Keville	M F37 Amb	30.10	
3rd place, bronze medalist(s)	1.00 kg	68	(Austria) Michael Steiner	M F37 Amb	27.52	

Rank	Weight	Number	FirstName Surname	Classification	Distance	Notes
1st place, gold medalist(s)	1.50 kg	69	(England) Mitchell Dutton	M F38 Amb	35.42	
2nd place, silver medalist(s)	1.50 kg	49	(England) George Anstie	M F38 Amb	24.04	
3rd place, bronze medalist(s)	1.50 kg	40	(England) Callum Hegg	M F38 Amb	17.21	

=== Ambulant Javelin Female ===
13/08/15 - F5 - 3.30pm: F35/36/37 Ambulant Javelin Female

Rank	Weight	Number	FirstName Surname	Classification	Distance	Notes
1st place, gold medalist(s)	600g	11	(Austria) Dagmar Reicht	F F35 Amb	6.27	

Rank	Weight	Number	FirstName Surname	Classification	Distance	Notes
1st place, gold medalist(s)	600g	6	(Austria) Angelika Erhart	F F36 Amb	5.33	

Rank	Weight	Number	FirstName Surname	Classification	Distance	Notes
1st place, gold medalist(s)	600g	29	(Republic of Ireland) Rachel Power	F F37 Amb	15.53	
2nd place, silver medalist(s)	600g	9	(England) Cathy Booth	F F37 Amb	14.46	

=== Ambulant Long Jump Male ===
14/08/15 - F6 - 10.30am: F35/36/37/38 Ambulant Long Jump Male

Rank	Number	FirstName Surname	Classification	Distance	Notes
1st place, gold medalist(s)	83	(England) Ryan Raghoo	M F36	2.82	
2nd place, silver medalist(s)	71	(Austria) Murat Er	M F36 Amb	2.41	

Rank	Number	FirstName Surname	Classification	Distance	Notes
1st place, gold medalist(s)	60	(England) Joseph Strong	M F35R Amb	3.10	

Rank	Number	FirstName Surname	Classification	Distance	Notes
1st place, gold medalist(s)	43	(Australia) Darren Thrupp	M F37 Amb	5.07	
2nd place, silver medalist(s)	56	(Scotland) Jason MacLean	M F37 Amb	4.42	
3rd place, bronze medalist(s)	74	(Australia) Nicholas Riches	M F37 Amb	3.95	
4.	37	(England) Anthony Bryan	M F37 Amb	3.57	

Rank	Number	FirstName Surname	Classification	Distance	Notes
1st place, gold medalist(s)	64	(Austria) Markus Ebner	M F38 Amb	2.47	

Ambulant Long Jump Pentathlon Female

Rank	Number	FirstName Surname	Classification	Distance	Notes
	2	(England) Amy Wareing	F P38 Amb	3.13	338 points

=== Seated Club Female/Male ===
14/08/15 - F7 - 11.00am: F31/32 Seated Club Female/Male

Rank	Weight	Number	FirstName Surname	Classification	Distance	Notes
1st place, gold medalist(s)	397g	1	(England) Abbie Hunnisett	F F32 WC	20.85	
2nd place, silver medalist(s)	397g	20	(Republic of Ireland) Kate Kelly	F F32 WC	13.23	
3rd place, bronze medalist(s)	397g	13	(England) Ellie Simpson	F F32 WC	7.77	

Rank	Weight	Number	FirstName Surname	Classification	Distance	Notes
1st place, gold medalist(s)	397g	51	(Scotland) Graham Condie	M F32 WC	22.82	
2nd place, silver medalist(s)	397g	86	(England) Stewart Chappell	M F32 WC	15.71	

Rank	Weight	Number	FirstName Surname	Classification	Distance	Notes
1st place, gold medalist(s)	397g	70	(England) Muninder Hayer	M F31 WC	12.18	

=== Ambulant Long Jump Female ===
14/08/15 - F8 - 11.30am: F35/36/37/38 Ambulant Long Jump Female

Rank	Number	FirstName Surname	Classification	Distance	Notes
1st place, gold medalist(s)	27	(England) Molly Kingsbury	F F37 Amb	3.68	
2nd place, silver medalist(s)	4	(England) Amy Carr	F F37 Amb	3.54	
3rd place, bronze medalist(s)	3	(Scotland) Amy Currie	F F37 Amb	2.71	

Rank	Number	FirstName Surname	Classification	Distance	Notes
1st place, gold medalist(s)	14	(England) Emily Stewart	F F38 Amb	3.07	

Rank	Number	FirstName Surname	Classification	Distance	Notes
1st place, gold medalist(s)	90	(England) Stacey Hurrell	F F36	3.04	

=== Shot Put Pentathlon Female ===
14/08/15 - F9 - 12.15pm: F38 Shot Put Pentathlon Female

Rank	Number	FirstName Surname	Classification	Distance	Notes
	2	(England) Amy Wareing	F P38 Amb	7.56	371 points

=== Ambulant Javelin Male ===
14/08/15 - F10 - 2.00pm: F35/36/37/38 Ambulant Javelin Male

Rank	Weight	Number	FirstName Surname	Classification	Distance	Notes
1st place, gold medalist(s)	600g	89	(England) William Baxter	M F36 Amb	23.85	
2nd place, silver medalist(s)	600g	39	(Austria) Bruno Wechselberger	M F36 Amb	11.14	
3rd place, bronze medalist(s)	600g	65	(Republic of Ireland) Martin Coleman	M F36 Amb	10.49	
4.	600g	71	(Austria) Murat Er	M F36 Amb	8.87	

Rank	Weight	Number	FirstName Surname	Classification	Distance	Notes
1st place, gold medalist(s)	600g	88	(England) Tyrone Williams	M F37 Amb	24.06	
2nd place, silver medalist(s)	600g	68	(Austria) Michael Steiner	M F37 Amb	23.07	
3rd place, bronze medalist(s)	1.00 kg	44	(England) Dylan Keville	M F37 Amb	21.39	

Rank	Weight	Number	FirstName Surname	Classification	Distance	Notes
1st place, gold medalist(s)	800g	69	(England) Mitchell Dutton	M F38 Amb	36.60	
2nd place, silver medalist(s)	800g	64	(Austria) Markus Ebner	M F38 Amb	10.45	

=== Discus Pentathlon Female ===
14/08/15 - F11 - 3.00pm: F38 Discus Pentathlon Female

Rank	Lane	Number	FirstName Surname	Classification	Distance	Notes
1st place, gold medalist(s)	1	2	(England) Amy Wareing	F P38 Amb	24.06	352 points

=== Seated Shot Female/Male ===
14/08/15 - F12 - 3.00pm: F32/33/34 Seated Shot Female/Male

Rank	Weight	Number	FirstName Surname	Classification	Distance	Notes
1st place, gold medalist(s)	3.00 kg	30	(England) Samantha Gray	F F33 WC	3.91	

Rank	Weight	Number	FirstName Surname	Classification	Distance	Notes
1st place, gold medalist(s)	2.00 kg	51	(Scotland) Graham Condie	M F32 WC	3.38	

Rank	Weight	Number	FirstName Surname	Classification	Distance	Notes
1st place, gold medalist(s)	3.00 kg	47	(England) Gavin Yarwood	M F33 WC	8.24	
2nd place, silver medalist(s)	3.00 kg	42	(Republic of Ireland) Daniel Hanks	M F33 WC	5.66	

Rank	Weight	Number	FirstName Surname	Classification	Distance	Notes
1st place, gold medalist(s)	4.00 kg	85	(Republic of Ireland) Sean Hughes	M F34 WC	7.36	

=== Ambulant Discus Female ===
15/08/15 - F13 - 10.30am: F35/F36/37/38 Ambulant Discus Female

Rank	Weight	Number	FirstName Surname	Classification	Distance	Notes
1st place, gold medalist(s)	1.00 kg	7	(England) Anna Nicholson	F F35 Amb	21.89	
2nd place, silver medalist(s)	1.00 kg	15	(England) Fiona Montgomery	F F35 Amb	10.77	
3rd place, bronze medalist(s)	1.00 kg	11	(Austria) Dagmar Reicht	F F35 Amb	9.31	

Rank	Weight	Number	FirstName Surname	Classification	Distance	Notes
1st place, gold medalist(s)	1.00 kg	26	(England) Mary Wilson	F F36	15.53	
2nd place, silver medalist(s)	1.00 kg	6	(Austria) Angelika Erhart	F F36 Amb	7.91	

Rank	Weight	Number	FirstName Surname	Classification	Distance	Notes
1st place, gold medalist(s)	1.00 kg	10	(Republic of Ireland) Cliona Horan	F F37 Amb	14.01	

Rank	Weight	Number	FirstName Surname	Classification	Distance	Notes
1st place, gold medalist(s)	1.00 kg	2	(England) Amy Wareing	F F38 Amb	24.25	

=== Ambulant Shot Male ===
15/08/15 - F14 - 11.15am: F35/36 Ambulant Shot Male

Rank	Weight	Number	FirstName Surname	Classification	Distance	Notes
1st place, gold medalist(s)	4.00 kg	38	(England) Ashley Breen	M F35 Amb	8.03	
2nd place, silver medalist(s)	4.00 kg	35	(Austria) Andreas Janitsch	M F35 Amb	6.49	

Rank	Weight	Number	FirstName Surname	Classification	Distance	Notes
1st place, gold medalist(s)	4.00 kg	89	(England) William Baxter	M F36 Amb	9.86	
2nd place, silver medalist(s)	4.00 kg	39	(Austria) Bruno Wechselberger	M F36 Amb	5.29	
3rd place, bronze medalist(s)	4.00 kg	65	(Republic of Ireland) Martin Coleman	M F36	4.56	

15/08/15 - F15 - 2.30pm: F37/F38 Ambulant Shot Male

Rank	Weight	Number	FirstName Surname	Classification	Distance	Notes
1st place, gold medalist(s)	5.00 kg	68	(Austria) Michael Steiner	M F37 Amb	9.95	
2nd place, silver medalist(s)	5.00 kg	88	(England) Tyrone Williams	M F37 Amb	9.88	
3rd place, bronze medalist(s)	5.00 kg	56	(Scotland) Jason MacLean	M F37 Amb	9.51	
4.	5.00 kg	82	(England) Robbie Carrick-Smith	M F37 Amb	8.71	

Rank	Weight	Number	FirstName Surname	Classification	Distance	Notes
1st place, gold medalist(s)	5.00 kg	62	(England) Lee Cupit	M F38 Amb	9.77	
2nd place, silver medalist(s)	5.00 kg	40	(England) Callum Hegg	M F38 Amb	5.99	
	5.00 kg	69	(England) Mitchell Dutton	M F38 Amb		DNS

=== 100m Wheelchair Female ===
13/08/15 - T1 - 10.15am: 100m T33/T34 Wheelchair Female

Rank	Lane	Number	FirstName Surname	Classification	Time	Notes
1st place, gold medalist(s)	4	31	(Scotland) Shelby Watson	F T33 WC	00:22.40	
2nd place, silver medalist(s)	2	33	(England) Sophie Taylor	F T33 WC	00:25.58	
3rd place, bronze medalist(s)	3	34	(England) Yasmin Somers	F T33 w/c	00:31.13	

=== 800m RaceRunning Female ===
13/08/15 - T2 - 10.30am: 800m RR1/2/3 Female

Rank	Lane	Number	FirstName Surname	Classification	Time	Notes
1st place, gold medalist(s)	3	16	(Denmark) Hayla Sondergaard	F RR1 WC	05:27.30	
2nd place, silver medalist(s)	2	28	(Sweden) Pauline Lundberg	F RR1 WC	05:51.84	

Rank	Lane	Number	FirstName Surname	Classification	Result	Notes
1st place, gold medalist(s)	4	5	(Portugal) Ana Machado	F RR2 WC	05:19.23	

Rank	Lane	Number	FirstName Surname	Classification	Time	Notes
1st place, gold medalist(s)	6	32	(Sweden) Sofia Ahonen	F RR3 WC	04:00.45	
	5	18	(Sweden) Julia Hedenstrom	F RR3		DNS

=== 800m Ambulant Female ===
13/08/15 - T3 - 11.00am: 800m T36 Ambulant Female

no competition

=== 800m RaceRunning Male ===
13/08/15 - T4 - 11.30am: 800m RR1/2/3 Male

Rank	Lane	Number	FirstName Surname	Classification	Time	Notes
1st place, gold medalist(s)	2	48	(Portugal) Gavin Drysdale	M RR3	03:02.06	
2nd place, silver medalist(s)	6	67	(Portugal) Matthew Humphreys	M RR3 Amb	03:31.33	

Rank	Lane	Number	FirstName Surname	Classification	Time	Notes
1st place, gold medalist(s)	3	53	(Portugal) Hugo Correia	M RR1 WC	05:05.13	

Rank	Lane	Number	FirstName Surname	Classification	Time	Notes
1st place, gold medalist(s)	4	61	(Denmark) Lasse Kromann	M RR2 WC	03:05.39	
2nd place, silver medalist(s)	5	58	(Portugal) Joao Lomar	M RR2 WC	04:18.70	

=== 800m Wheelchair Male ===
13/08/15 - T5 - 12.00pm: 800m T33/T34 Wheelchair Male

Rank	Lane	Number	FirstName Surname	Classification	Time	Notes
1st place, gold medalist(s)	2	73	(Scotland) Nathan Blackie	M T34 WC	02:12.35	
2nd place, silver medalist(s)	3	59	(England) Joe Brazier	M T34 WC	02:24.84	

=== 800m Ambulant Male ===
13/08/15 - T6 - 12.15pm: 800m T35/36/37/38 Ambulant Male

Rank	Lane	Number	FirstName Surname	Classification	Time	Notes
1st place, gold medalist(s)	2	87	(Austria) Tobias Mairer	M T35 Amb	04:34.31	

Rank	Lane	Number	FirstName Surname	Classification	Time	Notes
1st place, gold medalist(s)	3	37	(England) Anthony Bryan	M T37 Amb	02:46.96	

Rank	Lane	Number	FirstName Surname	Classification	Time	Notes
1st place, gold medalist(s)	4	45	(Scotland) Ewan Waite	M T38 Amb	02.23.21	
2nd place, silver medalist(s)	5	64	(Austria) Markus Ebner	M T38 Amb	03:41.50	
0	6	55	(England) Jack Gladman	M T38 Amb		

Rank	Lane	Number	FirstName Surname	Classification	Time	Notes
1st place, gold medalist(s)	7	6	(Austria) Angelika Erhart	F T36 Amb	03:32.94	

=== 400m RaceRunning Female ===
13/08/15 - T7 - 2.00pm: 400m RR1/2/3 Female

Rank	Lane	Number	FirstName Surname	Classification	Time	Notes
1st place, gold medalist(s)	2	28	(Sweden) Pauline Lundberg	F RR1 WC	02:39.02	
2nd place, silver medalist(s)	3	16	(Denmark) Hayla Sondergaard	F RR1 WC	02:51.45	

Rank	Lane	Number	FirstName Surname	Classification	Time	Notes
1st place, gold medalist(s)	4	5	(Portugal) Ana Machado	F RR2 WC	02:31.88	

Rank	Lane	Number	FirstName Surname	Classification	Time	Notes
1st place, gold medalist(s)	6	32	(Sweden) Sofia Ahonen	F RR3 WC	01:50.60	
2nd place, silver medalist(s)	5	18	(Sweden) Julia Hedenstrom	F RR3	01:59.13	

=== 400m Wheelchair Female ===
13/08/15 - T8 - 2.15pm: 400m T33/T34 Wheelchair Female

Rank	Lane	Number	FirstName Surname	Classification	Time	Notes
1st place, gold medalist(s)	2	31	(Scotland) Shelby Watson	F T33 WC	01:14.46	WR

=== 400m Ambulant Female ===
13/08/15 - T9 - 2.30pm: 400m T35/36/37/38 Ambulant Female

Rank	Lane	Number	FirstName Surname	Classification	Time	Notes
1st place, gold medalist(s)	2	15	(England) Fiona Montgomery	F T35 Amb	01:44.41	
2nd place, silver medalist(s)	3	22	(England) Leaha Dixon	F T35R Amb	01:45.21	

Rank	Lane	Number	FirstName Surname	Classification	Time	Notes
1st place, gold medalist(s)	4	21	(England) Kelly Hutchins	F T37 Amb	01:14.62	

=== 400m RaceRunning Male ===
13/08/15 - T10 - 2.45pm: 400m RR1 RaceRunning Male

Rank	Lane	Number	FirstName Surname	Classification	Time	Notes
1st place, gold medalist(s)	4	52	(Sweden) Henrik Eriksson	M RR1 WC	02.15.96	
2nd place, silver medalist(s)	2	53	(Portugal) Hugo Correia	M RR1 WC	02:20.36	
3rd place, bronze medalist(s)	3	77	(Sweden) Olof Da Silva	M RR1 WC	02:47.92	

13/08/15 - T11 - 3.00pm: 400m RR2/3 RaceRunning Male

Rank	Lane	Number	FirstName Surname	Classification	Time	Notes
1st place, gold medalist(s)	2	67	(England) Matthew Humphreys	M RR3 Amb	01.39.79	

Rank	Lane	Number	FirstName Surname	Classification	Time	Notes
1st place, gold medalist(s)	5	61	(Denmark) Lasse Kromann	M RR2 WC	01:25.34	
2nd place, silver medalist(s)	4	79	(Sweden) Pontus Stalfors	M RR2 WC	01:46.74	
3rd place, bronze medalist(s)	3	58	(Portugal) Joao Lomar	M RR2 WC	02:01.23	

Rank	Lane	Number	FirstName Surname	Classification	Time	Notes
1st place, gold medalist(s)	6	48	(Scotland) Gavin Drysdale	M RR3	01:20.56	

=== 400m Wheelchair Male ===
13/08/15 - T12 - 3.15pm:400m T33/T34 Wheelchair Male

Rank	Lane	Number	FirstName Surname	Classification	Time	Notes
1st place, gold medalist(s)	2	73	(Scotland) Nathan Blackie	M T34 WC	01:04.80	
2nd place, silver medalist(s)	3	59	(England) Joe Brazier	M T34 WC	01:11.87	

=== 400m Ambulant Male ===
13/08/15 - T13 - 3.30pm: 400m T35/36 Ambulant Male

Rank	Lane	Number	FirstName Surname	Classification	Time	Notes
1st place, gold medalist(s)	3	35	(Austria) Andreas Janitsch	M T35 Amb	01:23.88	
2nd place, silver medalist(s)	2	87	(Austria) Tobias Mairer	M T35 Amb	02:04.75	

Rank	Lane	Number	FirstName Surname	Classification	Time	Notes
1st place, gold medalist(s)	5	80	(England) Reece Goodwin	M T36 Amb	01:04.36	
2nd place, silver medalist(s)	4	39	(Austria) Bruno Wechselberger	M T36 Amb	01:42.94	
3rd place, bronze medalist(s)	6	71	(Austria) Murat Er	M T36 Amb	01:54.98	

13/08/15 - T14 - 3.45pm: 400m T37 Ambulant Male

Rank	Lane	Number	FirstName Surname	Classification	Time	Notes
1st place, gold medalist(s)	6	78	(Republic of Ireland) Paul Keogan	M T37 Amb	00:58.14	
2nd place, silver medalist(s)	5	57	(England) Jayden Saberton	M T37 Amb	01:00.22	
3rd place, bronze medalist(s)	4	84	(England) Sean Jean-Houston	M T37 Amb	01:04.28	
4.	2	63	(Scotland) Lewis Clow	M T37 Amb	01.06.07	
	3	54	(Scotland) Ian Boyd	M T37 Amb		DNS

13/08/15 - T15 - 4.00pm: 400m T38 Ambulant Male

Rank	Lane	Number	FirstName Surname	Classification	Time	Notes
1st place, gold medalist(s)	2	41	(Republic of Ireland) Conor McIlveen	M T38 Amb	00:59.67	
2nd place, silver medalist(s)	5	75	(England) Nicholas Marsh	M T38 Amb	01:02.94	
3rd place, bronze medalist(s)	3	55	(England) Jack Gladman	M T38 Amb	01:03.37	
4.	4	64	(Austria) Markus Ebner	M T38 Amb	01:35.92	
	6	74	(Australia) Nicholas Riches	M T37 Amb	01:10.4	RAF

=== 800m Wheelchair Female ===
14/08/15 - T16 - 10.30am: 800m T33/T34 Wheelchair Female

Rank	Lane	Number	FirstName Surname	Classification	Time	Notes
1st place, gold medalist(s)	1	31	(Scotland) Shelby Watson	F T33 WC	02:41.54	

=== 3000m Ambulant Female/Male ===
14/08/15 - T17 - 11.00am: 3000m T36/37/38 Ambulant Female/Male

Rank	Lane	Number	FirstName Surname	Classification	Time	Notes
1st place, gold medalist(s)	1	6	(Austria) Anglelika Erhart	F T36 Amb	14:54.29	

Rank	Lane	Number	FirstName Surname	Classification	Time	Notes
1st place, gold medalist(s)	2	45	(Scotland) Ewan Waite	M T38 Amb	10:49.90	

=== 200m Ambulant Male ===
14/08/15 - T18 - 11.45am: 200m T35/36 Ambulant Male

Rank	Lane	Number	FirstName Surname	Classification	Time	Notes
1st place, gold medalist(s)	1	60	(England) Joseph Strong	M T35 Amb	00:35.79	
2nd place, silver medalist(s)	2	66	(England) Matthew Cornish	M T35	00:35.85	

Rank	Lane	Number	FirstName Surname	Classification	Time	Notes
1st place, gold medalist(s)	3	71	(Austria) Murat Er	M T36 Amb	00:41.29	
2nd place, silver medalist(s)	5	39	(Austria) Bruno Wechselberger	M T36 Amb	00:42.44	
3rd place, bronze medalist(s)	4	35	(Austria) Andreas Janitsch	M T35 Amb	00:38.10	
4.	7	87	(Austria) Tobias Mairer	M T35 Amb	00:43.33	
	6	80	(England) Reece Goodwin	M T36 Amb		DNS

14/08/15 - T19 - 12.00pm: 200m T37 Ambulant Male

Rank	Lane	Number	FirstName Surname	Classification	Time	Notes
	5	78	(Republic of Ireland) Paul Keogan	M T37 Amb	00:25.33	
	4	50	(England) George Fox	M T37 Amb	00:25.89	
	1	63	(Scotland) Lewis Clow	M T37 Amb	00:26.97	
	2	84	(England) Sean Jean-Houston	M T37 Amb	00:27.52	
	6	43	(Australia) Darren Thrupp	M T37 Amb	00:28.55	
	8	74	(Australia) Nicholas Riches	M T37 Amb	00:30.96	
	3	56	(Scotland) Jason MacLean	M T37 Amb		DNS
	7	54	(Scotland) Ian Boyd	M T37 Amb		DNS

14/08/15 - T20 - 12.15pm: 200m T38 Ambulant Male

Rank	Lane	Number	Conor McIlveen	Classification	Time	Notes
1st place, gold medalist(s)	3	41	(Republic of Ireland) Conor McIlveen	M T38 Amb	00:26.98	
2nd place, silver medalist(s)	2	75	(England) Nicholas Marsh	M T38 Amb	00:28.38	

=== 100m Pentathlon Female ===
14/08/15 - T21 - 1.45pm: 100m F38 Pentathlon Female

Rank	Lane	Number	FirstName Surname	Classification	Time	Notes
	1	2	(England) Amy Wearing	F P38 Amb	00:15.9	337 points

=== 200m RaceRunning Female ===
14/08/15 - T22 - 2.15pm: 200m RR1/2/3 RaceRunning Female

Rank	Lane	Number	FirstName Surname	Classification	Time	Notes
1st place, gold medalist(s)	1	13	(England) Ellie Simpson	F RR2 WC	00:53.56	
2nd place, silver medalist(s)	3	5	(Portugal) Ana Machado	F RR2 WC	01:06.43	

Rank	Lane	Number	FirstName Surname	Classification	Time	Notes
1st place, gold medalist(s)	2	28	(Sweden) Pauline Lundberg	F RR1 WC	01:11.13	
2nd place, silver medalist(s)	7	91	(Brazil) Jennifer Pereira Borges	F RR1	03:27.85	

Rank	Lane	Number	FirstName Surname	Classification	Time	Notes
1st place, gold medalist(s)	6	17	(Denmark) Helle Ladefoged	F RR3	00:45.19	
2nd place, silver medalist(s)	5	32	(Sweden) Sofia Ahonen	F RR3 WC	00:52.83	
3rd place, bronze medalist(s)	4	18	(Sweden) Julia Hedenstrom	F RR3	00:53.96	

=== 200m Wheelchair Female ===
14/08/15 - T23 - 2.30pm: 200m T33/T34 Wheelchair Female

Rank	Lane	Number	FirstName Surname	Classification	Time	Notes
	3	31	(Scotland) Shelby Watson	F T33 WC	00:40.22	
	2	34	(England) Yasmin Somers	F T33 w/c	01:00.78	

=== 200m Ambulant Female ===
14/08/15 - T24 - 2.45pm: 200m T35/36 Ambulant Female

Rank	Lane	Number	FirstName Surname	Classification	Time	Notes
1st place, gold medalist(s)	3	12	(England) Daphne Schrager	F T35 Amb	00:36.52	
2nd place, silver medalist(s)	2	25	(England) Maria Verdeille	F T35 Amb	00:42.84	

Rank	Lane	Number	FirstName Surname	Classification	Time	Notes
1st place, gold medalist(s)	5	90	(England) Stacey Hurrell	F T36	00:36.32	
2nd place, silver medalist(s)	4	6	(Austria) Anglelika Erhart	F T36 Amb	00:43.26	

14/08/15 - T25 - 3.00pm: 200m T37/38 Ambulant Female

Rank	Lane	Number	FirstName Surname	Classification	Time	Notes
1st place, gold medalist(s)	3	19	(England) Kadeena Cox	F T37 Amb	00:29.72	
2nd place, silver medalist(s)	5	3	(Scotland) Amy Currie	F T37 Amb	00:36.35	
3rd place, bronze medalist(s)	4	23	(Republic of Ireland) Lisa O'Donoghue	F T37 Amb	00:38.34	

Rank	Lane	Number	FirstName Surname	Classification	Time	Notes
1st place, gold medalist(s)	6	14	(England) Emily Stewart	F T38 Amb	00:31.39	

=== 200m RaceRunning Male ===
14/08/15 - T26 - 3.15pm: 200m RR1 RaceRunning Male

Rank	Lane	Number	FirstName Surname	Classification	Time	Notes
1st place, gold medalist(s)	4	76	(Denmark) Nikolaj Christensen	M RR1 WC	00:58.87	
2nd place, silver medalist(s)	3	53	(Portugal) Hugo Correia	M RR1 WC	01:05.71	
3rd place, bronze medalist(s)	6	46	(Brazil) Fabio Fernandes De Silva	M RR1 WC	01:09.99	
4.	2	77	(Sweden) Olof Da Silva	M RR1 WC	01:13.03	
5.	5	52	(Sweden) Henrik Eriksson	M RR1 WC	01:13.46	

14/08/15 - T27 - 3.30pm: 200m RR2/3 RaceRunning Male

Rank	Lane	Number	FirstName Surname	Classification	Time	Notes
1st place, gold medalist(s)	5	61	(Denmark) Lasse Kromann	M RR2 WC	00:40.00	
2nd place, silver medalist(s)	3	79	(Sweden) Pontus Stalfors	M RR2 WC	00:48.87	
3rd place, bronze medalist(s)	7	58	(Portugal) Joao Lomar	M RR2 WC	01:03.94	

Rank	Lane	Number	FirstName Surname	Classification	Time	Notes
1st place, gold medalist(s)	6	48	(Scotland) Gavin Drysdale	M RR3	00:38.15	
2nd place, silver medalist(s)	4	67	(England) Matthew Humphreys	M RR3 Amb	00:46.53	

=== 200m Wheelchair Male ===
14/08/15 - T28 - 3.45pm: 200m T33/T34 Wheelchair Male

Rank	Lane	Number	FirstName Surname	Classification	Time	Notes
1st place, gold medalist(s)	2	73	(Scotland) Nathan Blackie	M T34 WC	00:33.13	
2nd place, silver medalist(s)	4	59	(England) Joe Brazier	M T34 WC	00:34.65	
3rd place, bronze medalist(s)	3	36	(England) Andrew Small	M T34 WC	00:37.20	

=== 800m Pentathlon Female ===
14/08/15 - T29 - 4.00pm: 800m F38 Pentathlon Female

Rank	Lane	Number	FirstName Surname	Classification	Time	Notes
	1	2	(England) Amy Wareing	F P38 Amb	03:32.40	123 points

=== 5000m Ambulant Male ===
14/08/15 - T30 - 4.15pm: 5000m F38 Ambulant Male

Rank	Lane	Number	FirstName Surname	Classification	Time	Notes
1st place, gold medalist(s)	4	64	(Austria) Markus Ebner	M T38 Amb	28:48.45	

=== 1500m RaceRunning Male ===
15/08/15 - T31 - 10.30am: 1500m RR2/3 Male

Rank	Lane	Number	FirstName Surname	Classification	Time	Notes
1st place, gold medalist(s)	1	61	(Denmark) Lasse Kromann	M RR2 WC	05:58.02	

Rank	Lane	Number	FirstName Surname	Classification	Time	Notes
1st place, gold medalist(s)	2	48	(Scotland) Gavin Drysdale	M RR3	05:55.49	

=== 1500m Wheelchair Female/Male ===
15/08/15 - T32 - 11.00am: 1500m T33 Wheelchair Female/Male

no competition

15/08/15 - T33 - 11.00am: 1500m T33 Wheelchair Female/Male

Rank	Lane	Number	FirstName Surname	Classification	Time	Notes
1st place, gold medalist(s)	1	31	(Scotland) Shelby Watson	F T33 WC	04:55.85	

15/08/15 - T33 - 11.15am: 1500m T34 Wheelchair Female/Male

Rank	Lane	Number	FirstName Surname	Classification	Time	Notes
1st place, gold medalist(s)	2	73	(Scotland) Nathan Blackie	M T34 WC	04:31.63	

=== 1500m Ambulant Male ===
15/08/15 - T34 - 11.30am: 1500m T35/36/37/38 Ambulant Male

Rank	Lane	Number	FirstName Surname	Classification	Time	Notes
1st place, gold medalist(s)	2	87	(Austria) Tobias Mairer	M T35 Amb	09:31.18	

Rank	Lane	Number	FirstName Surname	Classification	Time	Notes
1st place, gold medalist(s)	3	37	(England) Anthony Bryan	M T37 Amb	05:50.78	

Rank	Lane	Number	FirstName Surname	Classification	Time	Notes
1st place, gold medalist(s)	4	55	(England) Jack Gladman	M T38 Amb	04:51.07	
2nd place, silver medalist(s)	6	45	(Scotland) Ewan Waite	M T38 Amb	04.51.34	
3rd place, bronze medalist(s)	5	64	(Austria) Markus Ebner	M T38 Amb	07:59.22	

=== 100m RaceRunning Female ===
15/08/15 - T35 - 11.45am: 100m RR1/2/3 RaceRunning Female

Rank	Lane	Number	FirstName Surname	Classification	Time	Notes
1st place, gold medalist(s)	1	28	(Sweden) Pauline Lundberg	F RR1 WC	00:36.72	
2nd place, silver medalist(s)	2	16	(Denmark) Hayla Sondergaard	F RR1 WC	00:45.73	

Rank	Lane	Number	FirstName Surname	Classification	Time	Notes
1st place, gold medalist(s)	3	13	(England) Ellie Simpson	F RR2 WC	00:27.41	
2nd place, silver medalist(s)	4	5	(Portugal) Ana Machado	F RR2 WC	00:35.42	

Rank	Lane	Number	FirstName Surname	Classification	Time	Notes
1st place, gold medalist(s)	6	17	(Denmark) Helle Ladefoged	F RR3	00:23.74	
2nd place, silver medalist(s)	5	32	(Sweden) Sofia Ahonen	F RR3 WC	00:26.85	
3rd place, bronze medalist(s)	7	18	(Sweden) Julia Hedenstrom	F RR3	00:28.61	

=== 100m RaceRunning Male ===
15/08/15 - T36 - 12.00noon: 100m RR1 RaceRunning Male

Rank	Lane	Number	FirstName Surname	Classification	Time	Notes
1st place, gold medalist(s)	4	76	(Denmark) Nikolaj Christensen	M RR1 WC	00:29.54	
2nd place, silver medalist(s)	2	53	(Portugal) Hugo Correia	M RR1 WC	00:34.98	
3rd place, bronze medalist(s)	5	77	(Sweden) Olof Da Silva	M RR1 WC	00:39.72	
4.	3	52	(Sweden) Henrik Eriksson	M RR1 WC	00:43.74	

15/08/15 - T37 - 2.00pm: 100m RR2/3 RaceRunning Male

Rank	Lane	Number	FirstName Surname	Classification	Time	Notes
1st place, gold medalist(s)	6	48	(Scotland) Gavin Drysdale	M RR3	00:19.20	
2nd place, silver medalist(s)	2	67	(England) Matthew Humphreys	M RR3 Amb	00:23.09	

Rank	Lane	Number	FirstName Surname	Classification	Time	Notes
1st place, gold medalist(s)	5	61	(Denmark) Lasse Kromann	M RR2 WC	00:21.22	
2nd place, silver medalist(s)	4	79	(Sweden) Pontus Stalfors	M RR2 WC	00:23.86	
3rd place, bronze medalist(s)	3	58	(Portugal) Joao Lomar	M RR2 WC	00:31.22	

=== 100m Ambulant Female ===
15/08/15 - T38 - 2.10pm: 100m T35/36 Ambulant Female

Rank	Lane	Number	FirstName Surname	Classification	Time	Notes
1st place, gold medalist(s)	4	12	(England) Daphne Schrager	F T35 Amb	00:17.48	
2nd place, silver medalist(s)	2	15	(England) Fiona Montgomery	F T35 Amb	00:21.21	
3rd place, bronze medalist(s)	5	11	(Austria) Dagmar Reicht	F T35 Amb	00:49.09	

Rank	Lane	Number	FirstName Surname	Classification	Time	Notes
1st place, gold medalist(s)	1	90	(England) Stacey Hurrell	F T36	00:16.41	
2nd place, silver medalist(s)	3	6	(Austria) Anglelika Erhart	F T36 Amb	00:20.65	

15/08/15 - T39 - 2.20pm: 100m T37/38 Ambulant Female

Rank	Lane	Number	FirstName Surname	Classification	Time	Notes
1st place, gold medalist(s)	1	19	(England) Kadeena Cox	F T37 Amb	00:14.10	
2nd place, silver medalist(s)	3	4	(England) Amy Carr	F T37 Amb	00:15.26	
3rd place, bronze medalist(s)	4	3	(Scotland) Amy Currie	F T37 Amb	00:17.24	
4.	2	23	(Republic of Ireland) Lisa O'Donoghue	F T37 Amb	00:22.38	

Rank	Lane	Number	FirstName Surname	Classification	Time	Notes
1st place, gold medalist(s)	5	14	(England) Emily Stewart	F T38 Amb	00:15.15	
	6	2	(England) Amy Wareing	F T38 Amb		DNS

=== 100m Wheelchair Male ===
15/08/15 - T40 - 2.30pm: 100m T33/34 Wheelchair Male

Rank	Lane	Number	FirstName Surname	Classification	Time	Notes
1st place, gold medalist(s)	3	36	(England) Andrew Small	M T33 WC	00:20.25	

Rank	Lane	Number	FirstName Surname	Classification	Time	Notes
1st place, gold medalist(s)	2	73	(Scotland) Nathan Blackie	M T34 WC	00:18.65	
2nd place, silver medalist(s)	4	59	(England) Joe Brazier	M T34 WC	00:19.35	

=== 100m Ambulant Male ===
15/08/15 - T41 - 2.45pm: 100m T35/36 Ambulant Male

Rank	Lane	Number	FirstName Surname	Classification	Time	Notes
1st place, gold medalist(s)	2	60	(England) Joseph Strong	M T35 Amb	00:16.15	
2nd place, silver medalist(s)	3	35	(Austria) Andreas Janitsch	M T35 Amb	00:17.91	
3rd place, bronze medalist(s)	1	87	(Austria) Tobias Mairer	M T35 Amb	00:20.63	

Rank	Lane	Number	FirstName Surname	Classification	Time	Notes
1st place, gold medalist(s)	4	80	(England) Reece Goodwin	M T36 Amb	00:13.71	
2nd place, silver medalist(s)	7	71	(Austria) Murat Er	M T36 Amb	00:18.75	
3rd place, bronze medalist(s)	5	39	(England) Bruno Wechselberger	M T36 Amb	00:19.66	
	6	83	(Austria) Ryan Raghoo	M T36		DNS

15/08/15 - T42 - 3.00pm: 100m T37 Ambulant Male

Rank	Lane	Number	FirstName Surname	Classification	Time	Notes
1st place, gold medalist(s)	4	78	(Republic of Ireland) Paul Keogan	M T37 Amb	00:12.55	
2nd place, silver medalist(s)	1	50	(England) George Fox	M T37 Amb	00:12.99	
3rd place, bronze medalist(s)	7	57	(England) Jayden Saberton	M T37 Amb	00:12.99	
4.	5	63	(Scotland) Lewis Clow	M T37 Amb	00:13.20	
5.	6	43	(Australia) Darren Thrupp	M T37 Amb	00:13.85	
6.	8	74	(Australia) Nicholas Riches	M T37 Amb	00:14.32	
	2	54	(Scotland) Ian Boyd	M T37 Amb		DNS
	3	56	(Scotland) Jason MacLean	M T37 Amb		DNS

Rank	Lane	Number	FirstName Surname	Classification	Time	Notes
1st place, gold medalist(s)	9	64	(Australia) Markus Ebner	M T38 Amb	00:19.34	

=== Ambulant Relay Female/Male ===
15/08/15 - T43+T44 - 3.30pm: Ambulant Relay Female/Male

Rank	Lane	FirstName Surname	Time	Notes
1st place, gold medalist(s)	4	England A	00:57.10	
2nd place, silver medalist(s)	5	England B	01:03.64	
	2	(Scotland) Scossies	00:53.98	
	6	(Republic of Ireland) Ireland	01:00.77	
	3	Austria		DSQ

Rank	Lane	FirstName Surname	Result	Notes
1st place, gold medalist(s)	7	England Women	01:00.33	
