= F31 =

F31 or F.31 may refer to:

== Vehicles ==
Aircraft

- Farman F.31, a French prototype fighter aircraft

Automobiles

- BMW 3 Series (F31), a German estate car
- Nissan Leopard F31, a Japanese sedan

Ships and boats

- F-31 Sport Cruiser a trimaran sailboat
- HMS Cyclops (F31), a submarine depot ship of the Royal Navy
- HMS Mohawk (F31), a Tribal-class destroyer of the Royal Navy
- INS Brahmaputra (F31), two frigates of the Indian Navy

== Other uses ==
- F31 (classification), a disability sport classification for seated throwing events
- Bipolar affective disorder (DSM code F31)
- Fluorine-31 (^{31}F; F-31), an isotope of fluorine

== See also ==
- Shenyang FC-31, 5th generation stealth fighter from China, sometimes referred to as the "F-31"
- 31 (disambiguation)
