= C31 =

C31 or C-31 may refer to:

== Vehicles ==
- Fokker C-31A Troopship, a Dutch military transport
- HMS C31, a C-class submarine of the Royal Navy
- Nissan Laurel C31, a Japanese sedan
- Sauber C31, a Swiss Formula One car

== Other uses ==
- Blackstripe corydoras, a tropical freshwater fish
- C-31 highway (Spain), in Catalonia
- C31 road (Namibia)
- Bill C-31, various legislation of the Parliament of Canada
- Caldwell 31, an emission/reflection nebula
- Channel 31 (disambiguation)
- King's Gambit, Falkbeer Countergambit, a chess opening
- C31, a London Cycleway
