= Swimming at the 2015 CPISRA World Games =

- Venue: Harvey Hadden Complex
- Location: Nottingham, England
- Dates: 13 – 15 August

The swimming competitions at the 2015 CPISRA World Games took place from 13 to 15 August at the Harvey Hadden Complex in a 25m Pool.

== Overview ==
	S4/SB4/SM4		S5/SB5/SM5		S6/SB6/SM6		S7/SB7/SM7		S8/SB8/SM8		S9/SB9/SM9		S10/SB10/SM10	
Backstroke
50m	Male	Female	Male	Female	Male	Female	Male	Female	Male	Female	Male	Female	Male	Female
100m	Male	Female	Male	Female	Male	Female	Male	Female	Male	Female	Male	Female	Male	Female
200m	Male	Female	Male	Female	Male	Female	Male	Female	Male	Female	Male	Female	Male	Female
400m	Male	Female	Male	Female	Male	Female	Male	Female	Male	Female	Male	Female	Male	Female
Breaststroke
50m	Male	Female	Male	Female	Male	Female	Male	Female	Male	Female	Male	Female	Male	Female
100m	Male	Female	Male	Female	Male	Female	Male	Female	Male	Female	Male	Female	Male	Female
200m	Male	Female	Male	Female	Male	Female	Male	Female	Male	Female	Male	Female	Male	Female
400m	Male	Female	Male	Female	Male	Female	Male	Female	Male	Female	Male	Female	Male	Female
Butterfly stroke
50m	Male	Female	Male	Female	Male	Female	Male	Female	Male	Female	Male	Female	Male	Female
100m	Male	Female	Male	Female	Male	Female	Male	Female	Male	Female	Male	Female	Male	Female
200m	Male	Female	Male	Female	Male	Female	Male	Female	Male	Female	Male	Female	Male	Female
400m	Male	Female	Male	Female	Male	Female	Male	Female	Male	Female	Male	Female	Male	Female
Freestyle swimming
50m	Male	Female	Male	Female	Male	Female	Male	Female	Male	Female	Male	Female	Male	Female
100m	Male	Female	Male	Female	Male	Female	Male	Female	Male	Female	Male	Female	Male	Female
200m	Male	Female	Male	Female	Male	Female	Male	Female	Male	Female	Male	Female	Male	Female
400m	Male	Female	Male	Female	Male	Female	Male	Female	Male	Female	Male	Female	Male	Female
Medley swimming
200m	N/A	N/A	N/A	N/A	Male	Female	Male	Female	Male	Female	Male	Female	N/A	N/A

== Results - Finals ==
=== 13 August 2015 - Session Two Finals ===
==== Men's S6-S7 100m Backstroke ====
EVENT 108 FINAL OF EVENT 101 Men's S6-S7 100m Backstroke Category S6

Rank	Name	Date of Birth	Time	FINA Pt	50m	Notes
1st place, gold medalist(s)	(England) William Holland-Leaven	25/12/90	1:39.29	119	48.79	
2nd place, silver medalist(s)	(England) Benjamin Rees	23/01/97	2:00.81	66	58.10	

Category S7

Rank	Name	Date of Birth	Time	FINA Pt	50m	Notes
1st place, gold medalist(s)	(Hungary) András Széni	01/03/01	1:25.66	186	41.74	
2nd place, silver medalist(s)	(Australia) William Baker	18/09/96	1:32.22	149	45.22	
3rd place, bronze medalist(s)	(Scotland) Sam Agnew	27/10/95	2:09.80	53	1:03.11	

==== Men's S8-S10 100m Backstroke ====
EVENT 109 FINAL OF EVENT 101 Men's S8-S10 100m Backstroke Category S8

Rank	Name	Date of Birth	Time	FINA Pt	50m	Notes
	(Australia) Robert Stott	16/11/98				DQ

Category S9

Rank	Name	Date of Birth	Time	FINA Pt	50m	Notes
1st place, gold medalist(s)	(Scotland) Isaac Dunning	02/02/97	1:22.22	210	40.48	
	(England) Benjamin Lunn	04/08/87				DQ

Category S10

Rank	Name	Date of Birth	Time	FINA Pt	50m	Notes
1st place, gold medalist(s)	(Republic of Ireland) Thomas Maher	21/08/99	1:24.80	192	41.28	

==== Women's S6-S7 100m Backstroke ====
EVENT 110 FINAL OF EVENT 102 Women's S6-S7 100m Backstroke Category S6

Rank	Name	Date of Birth	Time	FINA Pt	50m	Notes
1st place, gold medalist(s)	(Australia) Rachel Staines	25/12/94	1:46.72	138	52.60	
	(England) Emily Anthony	17/06/99				DQ

Category S7

Rank	Name	Date of Birth	Time	FINA Pt	50m	Notes
1st place, gold medalist(s)	(England) Megan Short	05/03/98	1:42.42	156	50.24	
2nd place, silver medalist(s)	(Hungary) Réka Szabó	09/06/92	1:52.90	117	55.31	
3rd place, bronze medalist(s)	(Scotland) Mairin Savage	29/05/98	2:21.05	60	??	
4	(Austria) Lisa Sornig	13/12/97	2:31.14	48	1:12.65	

==== Women's S8-S10 100m Backstroke ====
EVENT 111 FINAL OF EVENT 102 Women's S8-S10 100m Backstroke Category S9

Rank	Name	Date of Birth	Time	FINA Pt	50m	Notes
1st place, gold medalist(s)	(England) Maya Brisco	20/10/00	1:24.10	283	41.48	
2nd place, silver medalist(s)	(England) Samantha Lewis	01/04/92	1:47.66	135	54.32	

==== Mixed S4-S5 50m Backstroke ====
EVENT 112 FINAL OF EVENT 103 Mixed S4-S5 50m Backstroke MEN'S - Category S4

Rank	Name	Date of Birth	Time	FINA Pt	Notes
1st place, gold medalist(s)	(Australia) Felix Bennett	30/06/92	1:45.31	9	

MEN'S - Category S5

Rank	Name	Date of Birth	Time	FINA Pt	Notes
1st place, gold medalist(s)	(England) Neil Smith	24/02/65	53.57	75	

WOMEN'S - Category S5

Rank	Name	Date of Birth	Time	FINA Pt	50m	Notes
1st place, gold medalist(s)	(Scotland) Kayleigh Haggo	01/02/99	1:03.46	66		

==== Men's SM6-SM7 200m Individual Medley ====
EVENT 113 FINAL OF EVENT 104 Men's SM6-SM7 200m Individual Medley Category SM6

Rank	Name	Date of Birth	Time	FINA Pt	50m, 100m, 150m	Notes
1st place, gold medalist(s)	(England) William Holland-Leaven	25/12/90	3:15.36	176	39.22, 1:31.97, 2:29.10	
2nd place, silver medalist(s)	(England) Benjamin Rees	23/01/97	4:21.02	74	56.72, 2:00.93, 3:23.42	

Category SM7

Rank	Name	Date of Birth	Time	FINA Pt	50m, 100m, 150m	Notes
1st place, gold medalist(s)	(England) Alexander Goodman	23/08/91	3:04.89	208	37.83, 1:29.09, 2:23.07	
2nd place, silver medalist(s)	(Australia) William Baker	18/09/96	3:07.08	201	40.16, 1:29.76, 2:23.99	

==== Men's SM8-SM9 200m Individual Medley ====
EVENT 114 FINAL OF EVENT 104 Men's SM8-SM9 200m Individual Medley Category SM8

Rank	Name	Date of Birth	Time	FINA Pt	50m, 100m, 150m	Notes
1st place, gold medalist(s)	(Australia) Robert Stott	16/11/98	3:09.30	194	1:31.16, 2:28.50, 3:09.39	

Category SM9

Rank	Name	Date of Birth	Time	FINA Pt	50m, 100m, 150m	Notes
1st place, gold medalist(s)	(Scotland) Joseph Brown	19/05/87	3:43.79	117	48.63, 1:52.83, 2:58.06	
	(England) Benjamin Lunn	04/08/87			DQ	

==== Women's SM6-SM8 200m Individual Medley ====
EVENT 115 FINAL OF EVENT 105 Women's SM6-SM8 200m Individual Medley Category SM6

Rank	Name	Date of Birth	Time	FINA Pt	50m, 100m, 150m	Notes
1st place, gold medalist(s)	(Australia) Rachel Staines	25/12/94	3:37.99	180	47.48, 1:44.50, 2:48.89	

Category SM7

Rank	Name	Date of Birth	Time	FINA Pt	50m, 100m, 150m	Notes
1st place, gold medalist(s)	(England) Grace Harvey	31/08/98	3:16.73	45	45.15, 1:35.19, 2:34.77	New British Record
2nd place, silver medalist(s)	(England) Megan Short	05/03/98	3:48.69	156	50.91, 1:47.69, 2:52.61	

Category SM8

Rank	Name	Date of Birth	Time	FINA Pt	50m, 100m, 150m	Notes
1st place, gold medalist(s)	(England) Hayley Milne	01/04/99	3:16.63	245	41.79, 1:32.41, 2:31.85	

==== Men's S4-S7 50m Freestyle ====
EVENT 116 FINAL OF EVENT 106 Men's S4-S7 50m Freestyle Category S4

Rank	Name	Date of Birth	Time	FINA Pt	Notes
1st place, gold medalist(s)	(Australia) Felix Bennett	30/06/92	1:30.51	11	

Category S5

Rank	Name	Date of Birth	Time	FINA Pt	Notes
1st place, gold medalist(s)	(England) Neil Smith	24/02/65	45.78	87	

Category S6

Rank	Name	Date of Birth	Time	FINA Pt	Notes
1st place, gold medalist(s)	(England) William Holland-Leaven	25/12/90	39.80	132	
2nd place, silver medalist(s)	(England) Benjamin Rees	23/01/97	51.39	61	
3rd place, bronze medalist(s)	(England) James Blott	20/04/01	51.87	59	

Category S7

Rank	Name	Date of Birth	Time	FINA Pt	Notes
1st place, gold medalist(s)	(Hungary) András Széni	01/03/01	33.16	229	
2nd place, silver medalist(s)	(Australia) William Baker	18/09/96	36.50	172	
3rd place, bronze medalist(s)	(England) Alexander Goodman	23/08/91	36.65	169	

==== Men's S8-S10 50m Freestyle ====
EVENT 117 FINAL OF EVENT 106 Men's S8-S10 50m Freestyle Category S8

Rank	Name	Date of Birth	Time	FINA Pt	Notes
1st place, gold medalist(s)	(Australia) Robert Stott	16/11/98	32.98	233	

Category S9

Rank	Name	Date of Birth	Time	FINA Pt	Notes
1st place, gold medalist(s)	(Scotland) Isaac Dunning	02/02/97	31.63	264	
2nd place, silver medalist(s)	(England) Darren Swash	23/04/83	32.91	234	
3rd place, bronze medalist(s)	(Scotland) Joseph Brown	19/05/87	35.84	181	
4	(England) Benjamin Lunn	04/08/87	42.80	106	

Category S10

Rank	Name	Date of Birth	Time	FINA Pt	Notes
1st place, gold medalist(s)	(Republic of Ireland) Thomas Maher	21/08/99	31.89	257	

==== Women's S5-S6 50m Freestyle ====
EVENT 118 FINAL OF EVENT 107 Women's S5-S6 50m Freestyle Category S5

Rank	Name	Date of Birth	Time	FINA Pt	Notes
1st place, gold medalist(s)	(Australia) Kristy Pond	25/07/96	1:01.33	54	
2nd place, silver medalist(s)	(Scotland) Kayleigh Haggo	01/02/99	1:03.61	48	

Category S6

Rank	Name	Date of Birth	Time	FINA Pt	Notes
1st place, gold medalist(s)	(Australia) Rachel Staines	25/12/94	43.95	147	
2nd place, silver medalist(s)	(England) Sophie Taylor	23/08/96	48.51	109	
3rd place, bronze medalist(s)	(England) Sarah Chown	23/01/82	1:09.24	37	

==== Women's S7-S9 50m Freestyle ====
EVENT 119 FINAL OF EVENT 107 Women's S7-S9 50m Freestyle Category S7

Rank	Name	Date of Birth	Time	FINA Pt	Notes
1st place, gold medalist(s)	(England) Graceella Cooper-Holme	26/08/00	42.09	168	
2nd place, silver medalist(s)	(England) Megan Short	05/03/98	44.88	138	
3rd place, bronze medalist(s)	(Scotland) Mairin Savage	29/05/98	57.13	67	

Category S8

Rank	Name	Date of Birth	Time	FINA Pt	Notes
1st place, gold medalist(s)	(England) Hayley Milne	01/04/99	41.44	176	
2nd place, silver medalist(s)	(Scotland) Kirsty Brunton	14/03/76	50.76	95	

Category S9

Rank	Name	Date of Birth	Time	FINA Pt	Notes
1st place, gold medalist(s)	(England) Maya Brisco	20/10/00	34.99	293	
2nd place, silver medalist(s)	(England) Samantha Lewis	01/04/92	42.57	162	

=== 14 August 2015 - Session Four ===
==== Men's S6-S7 400m Freestyle ====
EVENT 208 FINAL OF EVENT 201 Men's S6-S7 400m Freestyle Category S6

Rank	Name	Date of Birth	Time	FINA Pt	50m, 100m, 150m, 200m, 250m, 300m, 350m	Notes
1st place, gold medalist(s)	(England) Benjamin Rees	23/01/97	7:23.43	109	52.64, 1:47.64, 2:44.09, 3:41.95, 4:36.48, 5:33.78, 6:29.11, 7:23.43	
2nd place, silver medalist(s)	(England) James Blott	20/04/01	8:04.08	84	57.31, 1:56.87, 2:57.90, 3:59.69, 5:01.53, 6:03.18, 7:02.80, 8:04.08	

Category S7

Rank	Name	Date of Birth	Time	FINA Pt	50m, 100m, 150m, 200m, 250m, 300m, 350m	Notes
1st place, gold medalist(s)	(Australia) William Baker	18/09/96	6:31.57	159	43.05, 1:30.52, 2:22.24, 3:12.37, 4:03.52, 4:55.00, 5:44.49, 6:31.57	
2nd place, silver medalist(s)	(Scotland) Sam Agnew	27/10/95	9:17.19	55	1:06.21, 2:14.77, 3:25.90, 4:35.85, 5:49.10, 6:58.44, 8:08.96, 9:17.19	

==== Men's S8-S10 400m Freestyle ====
EVENT 209 FINAL OF EVENT 201 Men's S8-S10 400m Freestyle Category S8

Rank	Name	Date of Birth	Time	FINA Pt	50m, 100m, 150m, 200m, 250m, 300m, 350m	Notes
1st place, gold medalist(s)	(Australia) Robert Stott	16/11/98	5:53.38	216	40.03, 1:23.15, 2:07.70, 2:53.15, 3:39.16, 4:24.79, 5:10.41, 5:53.38	

Category S9

Rank	Name	Date of Birth	Time	FINA Pt	50m, 100m, 150m, 200m, 250m, 300m, 350m	Notes
1st place, gold medalist(s)	(England) Ryan Crouch	07/02/94	4:41.19	430	30.48, 1:04.79, 1:40.23, 2:16.32, 2:52.43, 3:29.03, 4:05.28, 4:41.19	
2nd place, silver medalist(s)	(Scotland) Isaac Dunning	02/02/97	5:54.58	214	39.48, 1:23.68, 2:08.95, 2:54.72, 3:40.49, 4:26.66, 5:11.72, 5:54.58	

Category S10

Rank	Name	Date of Birth	Time	FINA Pt	50m, 100m, 150m, 200m, 250m, 300m, 350m	Notes
1st place, gold medalist(s)	(Republic of Ireland) Thomas Maher	21/08/99	5:15.49	304	36.08, 1:14.08, 1:53.47, 2:33.62, 3:13.99, 3:54.96, 4:36.19, 5:15.49	

==== Women's S6-S7 400m Freestyle ====
EVENT 210 FINAL OF EVENT 202 Women's S6-S7 400m Freestyle Category S6

Rank	Name	Date of Birth	Time	FINA Pt	50m, 100m, 150m, 200m, 250m, 300m, 350m	Notes
1st place, gold medalist(s)	(Australia) Rachel Staines	25/12/94	6:51.38	185	45.19, 1:36.12, 2:28.92, 3:21.87, 4:13.96, 5:07.02, 6:00.42, 6:51.38	
2nd place, silver medalist(s)	(England) Sophie Taylor	23/08/96	6:53.73	182	49.85, 1:42.02, 2:34.55, 3:27.07, 4:19.54, 5:11.74, 6:04.51, 6:53.73	

Category S7

Rank	Name	Date of Birth	Time	FINA Pt	50m, 100m, 150m, 200m, 250m, 300m, 350m	Notes
1st place, gold medalist(s)	(England) Graceella Cooper-Holme	26/08/00	6:36.08	207	43.60, 1:31.42, 2:22.31, 3:13.42, 4:04.52, 4:55.90, 5:47.18, 6:36.08	

==== Women's S8-S9 400m Freestyle ====
EVENT 211 FINAL OF EVENT 202 Women's S8-S9 400m Freestyle Category S8

Rank	Name	Date of Birth	Time	FINA Pt	50m, 100m, 150m, 200m, 250m, 300m, 350m	Notes
1st place, gold medalist(s)	(Scotland) Kirsty Brunton	14/03/76	8:44.38	89	55.97, 1:57.98, 3:03.93, 4:11.77, 5:22.73, 6:29.56, 7:36.58, 8:44.38	

Category S9

Rank	Name	Date of Birth	Time	FINA Pt	50m, 100m, 150m, 200m, 250m, 300m, 350m	Notes
1st place, gold medalist(s)	(England) Maya Brisco	20/10/00	5:50.88	298	40.50, 1:24.63, 2:09.75, 2:55.30, 3:40.46, 4:25.50, 5:09.54, 5:50.88	

==== 203 Mixed S5 200m Freestyle ====
EVENT 212 FINAL OF EVENT 203 Mixed S5 200m Freestyle MEN'S - Category S5

Rank	Name	Date of Birth	Time	FINA Pt	50m, 100m, 150m	Notes
1st place, gold medalist(s)	(England) Neil Smith	24/02/65	3:34.83	98	50.06, 1:42.61, 2:38.27	

WOMEN'S - Category S5

Rank	Name	Date of Birth	Time	FINA Pt	50m, 100m, 150m	Notes
1st place, gold medalist(s)	(Scotland) Kayleigh Haggo	01/02/99	4:40.90	61	1:06.86, 2:16.42, 3:32.31	
2nd place, silver medalist(s)	(Australia) Kristy Pond	25/07/96	4:50.00	56	1:03.12, 2:15.35, 3:33.66	

==== Men's S8-S9 100m Butterfly ====
EVENT 213 FINAL OF EVENT 204 Men's S8-S9 100m Butterfly Category S8

Rank	Name	Date of Birth	Time	FINA Pt	50m	Notes
1st place, gold medalist(s)	(Australia) Robert Stott	16/11/98	1:29.16	160	41.07	

Category S9

Rank	Name	Date of Birth	Time	FINA Pt	50m	Notes
1st place, gold medalist(s)	(Scotland) Joseph Brown	19/05/87	1:52.43	80	48.60	

==== Women's S8-S9 100m Butterfly ====
EVENT 214 FINAL OF EVENT 205 Women's S8-S9 100m Butterfly Category S9

Rank	Name	Date of Birth	Time	FINA Pt	50m	Notes
1st place, gold medalist(s)	(England) Maya Brisco	20/10/00	1:41.03	161	48.96	

==== Men's S5-S6 50m Butterfly ====
EVENT 215 FINAL OF EVENT 206 Men's S5-S6 50m Butterfly Category S5

Rank	Name	Date of Birth	Time	FINA Pt	50m	Notes
1st place, gold medalist(s)	(England) Neil Smith	24/02/65	58.78	51		

Category S6

Rank	Name	Date of Birth	Time	FINA Pt	50m	Notes
1st place, gold medalist(s)	(England) William Holland-Leaven	25/12/90	37.31	199		

==== Men's S7 50m Butterfly ====
EVENT 216 FINAL OF EVENT 206 Men's S7 50m Butterfly Category S7

Rank	Name	Date of Birth	Time	FINA Pt	Notes
1st place, gold medalist(s)	(Hungary) András Széni	01/03/01	34.85	244	
2nd place, silver medalist(s)	(England) Alexander Goodman	23/08/91	35.88	224	
3rd place, bronze medalist(s)	(Australia) William Baker	18/09/96	38.94	175	

==== Women's S6-S7 50m Butterfly ====
EVENT 217 FINAL OF EVENT 207 Women's S6-S7 50m Butterfly Category S6

Rank	Name	Date of Birth	Time	FINA Pt	50m	Notes
1st place, gold medalist(s)	(Australia) Rachel Staines	25/12/94	43.39	177		

Category S7

Rank	Name	Date of Birth	Time	FINA Pt	50m	Notes
1st place, gold medalist(s)	(England) Grace Harvey	31/08/98	42.50	188		
2nd place, silver medalist(s)	(England) Megan Short	05/03/98	46.66	142		

=== 15 August 2015 - Session Six ===
==== Men's SB5-SB6 100m Breaststroke ====
EVENT 305 FINAL OF EVENT 301 Men's SB5-SB6 100m Breaststroke Category SB5

Rank	Name	Date of Birth	Time	FINA Pt	50m	Notes
1st place, gold medalist(s)	(England) Benjamin Rees	23/01/97	2:18.09	65	1:06.96	
2nd place, silver medalist(s)	(England) James Blott	20/04/01	2:36.46	44	1:13.58	

Category SB6

Rank	Name	Date of Birth	Time	FINA Pt	50m	Notes
1st place, gold medalist(s)	(England) William Holland-Leaven	25/12/90	1:42.90	157	49.65	
2nd place, silver medalist(s)	(Scotland) Sam Agnew	27/10/95	2:46.33	37	1:15.39	

==== Men's SB7-SB9 100m Breaststroke ====
EVENT 306 FINAL OF EVENT 301 Men's SB7-SB9 100m Breaststroke Category SB7

Rank	Name	Date of Birth	Time	FINA Pt	50m	Notes
1st place, gold medalist(s)	(Australia) William Baker	18/09/96	1:37.78	183	46.03	
2nd place, silver medalist(s)	(Australia) Robert Stott	16/11/98	1:40.11	171	46.22	
3rd place, bronze medalist(s)	(England) Alexander Goodman	23/08/91	1:43.06	157	47.65	

Category SB8

Rank	Name	Date of Birth	Time	FINA Pt	50m	Notes
1st place, gold medalist(s)	(England) Ryan Crouch	07/02/94	1:17.61	367	36.53	
2nd place, silver medalist(s)	(Scotland) Isaac Dunning	02/02/97	1:47.26	139	50.39	
3rd place, bronze medalist(s)	(Scotland) Joseph Brown	19/05/87	1:52.91	119	53.76	

Category SB9

Rank	Name	Date of Birth	Time	FINA Pt	50m	Notes
1st place, gold medalist(s)	(England) Darren Swash	23/04/83	1:26.92	261	40.77	
2nd place, silver medalist(s)	(England) Benjamin Lunn	04/08/87	1:50.30	128	52.68	

==== Women's SB5-SB6 100m Breaststroke ====
EVENT 307 FINAL OF EVENT 302 Women's SB5-SB6 100m Breaststroke Category SB5

Rank	Name	Date of Birth	Time	FINA Pt	50m	Notes
1st place, gold medalist(s)	(Scotland) Kayleigh Haggo	01/02/99	2:49.26	50	1:21.02	
2nd place, silver medalist(s)	(England) Sarah Chown	23/01/82	2:53.80	46	1:23.30	

Category SB6

Rank	Name	Date of Birth	Time	FINA Pt	50m	Notes
1st place, gold medalist(s)	(England) Grace Harvey	31/08/98	1:55.70	156	55.91	
2nd place, silver medalist(s)	(Australia) Rachel Staines	25/12/94	2:01.26	136	59.74	
3rd place, bronze medalist(s)	(England) Sophie Taylor	23/08/96	2:06.51	119	1:01.48	

==== Women's SB7-SB8 100m Breaststroke ====
EVENT 308 FINAL OF EVENT 302 Women's SB7-SB8 100m Breaststroke Category SB7

Rank	Name	Date of Birth	Time	FINA Pt	50m	Notes
1st place, gold medalist(s)	(England) Hayley Milne	01/04/99	1:50.30	180	51.98	
2nd place, silver medalist(s)	(Austria) Lisa Sornig	13/12/97	2:19.50	89	1:06.29	
3rd place, bronze medalist(s)	(Scotland) Kirsty Brunton	14/03/76	2:31.52	69	1:10.16	
4	(Hungary) Réka Szabó	09/06/92				DQ

Category SB8

Rank	Name	Date of Birth	Time	FINA Pt	50m	Notes
1st place, gold medalist(s)	(England) Samantha Lewis	01/04/92	1:57.93	147	55.27	
2nd place, silver medalist(s)	(Hungary) Réka Szabó	09/06/92				DQ

==== Men's S4-S6 100m Freestyle ====
EVENT 309 FINAL OF EVENT 303 Men's S4-S6 100m Freestyle Category S4

Rank	Name	Date of Birth	Time	FINA Pt	50m	Notes
1st place, gold medalist(s)	(Australia) Felix Bennett	30/06/92	3:43.35	8	1:29.27	

Category S5

Rank	Name	Date of Birth	Time	FINA Pt	50m	Notes
1st place, gold medalist(s)	(England) Neil Smith	24/02/65	1:39.44	92	47.76	

Category S6

Rank	Name	Date of Birth	Time	FINA Pt	50m	Notes
1st place, gold medalist(s)	(England) William Holland-Leaven	25/12/90	1:27.19	136	41.62	
2nd place, silver medalist(s)	(England) Benjamin Rees	23/01/97	1:48.68	70	54.04	
	(England) James Blott	20/04/01				DNC

==== Men's S7-S8 100m Freestyle ====
EVENT 310 FINAL OF EVENT 303 Men's S7-S8 100m Freestyle Category S7

Rank	Name	Date of Birth	Time	FINA Pt	50m	Notes
1st place, gold medalist(s)	(England) Alexander Goodman	23/08/91	1:18.69	186	36.52	
2nd place, silver medalist(s)	(Australia) William Baker	18/09/96	1:21.35	168	39.25	

Category S8

Rank	Name	Date of Birth	Time	FINA Pt	50m	Notes
1st place, gold medalist(s)	(Australia) Robert Stott	16/11/98	1:15.52	210	35.83	

==== Men's S9-S10 100m Freestyle ====
EVENT 311 FINAL OF EVENT 303 Men's S9-S10 100m Freestyle Category S9

Rank	Name	Date of Birth	Time	FINA Pt	50m	Notes
1st place, gold medalist(s)	(Scotland) Isaac Dunning	02/02/97	1:12.64	236	35.29	
2nd place, silver medalist(s)	(Scotland) Joseph Brown	19/05/87	1:24.16	152	38.58	
3rd place, bronze medalist(s)	(England) Benjamin Lunn	04/08/87	1:36.98	99	46.20	

Category S10

Rank	Name	Date of Birth	Time	FINA Pt	50m	Notes
1st place, gold medalist(s)	(Republic of Ireland) Thomas Maher	21/08/99	1:08.48	282	33.49	

==== Women's S5-S6 100m Freestyle ====
EVENT 312 FINAL OF EVENT 304 Women's S5-S6 100m Freestyle Category S5

Rank	Name	Date of Birth	Time	FINA Pt	50m	Notes
1st place, gold medalist(s)	(Australia) Kristy Pond	25/07/96	2:11.40	58	1:01.89	
2nd place, silver medalist(s)	(Scotland) Kayleigh Haggo	01/02/99	2:14.34	54	1:06.28	

Category S6

Rank	Name	Date of Birth	Time	FINA Pt	50m	Notes
1st place, gold medalist(s)	(Australia) Rachel Staines	25/12/94	1:37.08	145	46.05	
2nd place, silver medalist(s)	(England) Sophie Taylor	23/08/96	1:38.50	138	49.59	
3rd place, bronze medalist(s)	(England) Emily Anthony	17/06/99	1:56.37	84	56.14	
4	(England) Sarah Chown	23/01/82	2:32.23	37	1:12.99	

==== Women's S7 100m Freestyle ====
EVENT 313 FINAL OF EVENT 304 Women's S7 100m Freestyle Category S7

Rank	Name	Date of Birth	Time	FINA Pt	50m	Notes
1st place, gold medalist(s)	(England) Graceella Cooper-Holme	26/08/00	1:30.19	180	43.36	
2nd place, silver medalist(s)	(England) Megan Short	05/03/98	1:37.00	145	45.52	
3rd place, bronze medalist(s)	(Scotland) Mairin Savage	29/05/98	2:01.41	74	57.34	
4	(Austria) Lisa Sornig	13/12/97	2:02.30	72	57.51	

==== Women's S8-S9 100m Freestyle ====
EVENT 314 FINAL OF EVENT 304 Women's S8-S9 100m Freestyle Category S8

Rank	Name	Date of Birth	Time	FINA Pt	50m	Notes
1st place, gold medalist(s)	(England) Hayley Milne	01/04/99	1:26.71	203	41.02	
2nd place, silver medalist(s)	(Scotland) Kirsty Brunton	14/03/76	1:56.32	84	55.18	

Category S9

Rank	Name	Date of Birth	Time	FINA Pt	50m	Notes
1st place, gold medalist(s)	(England) Maya Brisco	20/10/00	1:15.28	311	36.49	
2nd place, silver medalist(s)	(England) Samantha Lewis	01/04/92	1:36.28	148	45.17	
