= Channel 31 =

Channel 31 refers to several television stations:

== Australia ==
The colloquial name for certain community television stations in Australia

- Access 31
- Hitchhike TV, formerly 31 Digital
- C31 Melbourne
- Channel 31 (Sydney)
- Channel 44 (Adelaide), formerly known as Channel 31

== Canada ==
The following television stations broadcast on digital channel 31 (UHF frequencies covering 573.25-577.75 MHz) in Canada:

- CBAT-DT in Fredericton, New Brunswick
- CHAU-DT-2 in Saint-Quentin, New Brunswick
- CITY-DT-2 in Woodstock, Ontario
- CIVB-DT-1 in Grand-Fonds, Quebec

The following television stations operate on virtual channel 31 in Canada:

- CITY-DT-2 in Woodstock, Ontario
- CIVB-DT-1 in Grand-Fonds, Quebec

== United States ==
- Channel 31 digital TV stations in the United States
- Channel 31 virtual TV stations in the United States
- Channel 31 low-power TV stations in the United States

== Other places ==
- Channel 31 (Kazakhstan), a nationwide television station in Kazakhstan
- BEAM Channel 31 in the Philippines
- RTHK TV 31 in Hong Kong
- 31. kanāls, a defunct Latvian television channel
- Channel 31 TV stations in Mexico

== See also ==
- 31 (disambiguation)
