= Section 31 =

Section 31 may refer to:

- Section 31 (Star Trek), a fictional organization
  - Star Trek: Section 31, a film about the organization
  - Star Trek: Section 31 (novel series), a novel series about the organization
- Section 31 of the Constitution of Australia
- Section 31 of the Canadian Charter of Rights and Freedoms
- Section 31 of the Broadcasting Act of Ireland
- Section 31 of the Indian Penal Code, definition of "will"
- Section 31 or Section 31 Project, initial name for the Storyliving by Disney Cotino community

== See also ==
- 31 (disambiguation)
