= 31 =

31 may refer to:

- 31 (number), the natural number following 30 and preceding 32

== Years ==
- 31 BC
- AD 31
- 1931
- 2031

== Music ==
- Thirty One (Jana Kramer album), 2015
- Thirty One (Jarryd James album), 2015
- "Thirty One", a song by Karma to Burn from the album Wild, Wonderful Purgatory, 1999

== Science ==
- Gallium, a post-transition metal in the periodic table
- 31 Euphrosyne, an asteroid in the asteroid belt
- (31) Euphrosyne I, a satellite of 31 Euphrosyne

== Film and television ==
- 31 (film), a 2016 horror film
- 31 (Kazakhstan), a television channel
- 31 Digital, an Australian video on demand service

== Transportation ==
- 31st (CTA station), a rapid transit station in Chicago
- Route 31 (MBTA), a bus route in Boston, Massachusetts
- 31 (RIPTA), a bus route in Rhode Island

== Other uses ==
- Thirty-one (card game)
- Baskin-Robbins, a U.S. international ice cream parlor chain with the slogan, "31 flavors"
- Male masturbation, particularly in Turkish language.
- The international calling code for the Netherlands

== See also ==
- 31st (disambiguation)
- Channel 31 (disambiguation)
- Section 31 (disambiguation)
- List of highways numbered 31
