= Channel 31 low-power TV stations in the United States =

The following low-power television stations broadcast on digital or analog channel 31 in the United States:

- K31AD-D in Victorville, etc., California
- K31AE-D in Sutherlin, Oregon
- K31AH-D in Omak, etc., Washington
- K31BI-D in Kingman, Arizona
- K31BM-D in Silver Springs, Nevada
- K31CI-D in Montpelier, Idaho
- K31CR-D in Prineville, etc., Oregon
- K31CT-D in Cortez, Colorado
- K31CW-D in Carbondale, Colorado
- K31DC-D in Freedom, Wyoming
- K31DR-D in Caballo, New Mexico
- K31DS-D in Coolin, Idaho
- K31EA-D in Littlefield, Arizona
- K31EF-D in Frost, Minnesota
- K31EI-D in Cedar Canyon, Utah
- K31EL-D in Tropic, etc., Utah
- K31EO-D in Mora, New Mexico
- K31FD-D in Boise, Idaho
- K31FN-D in Manti & Ephraim, Utah
- K31FP-D in Heber/Midway, Utah
- K31FQ-D in Park City, Utah
- K31FR-D in Preston, Idaho
- K31FU-D in Golconda, Nevada
- K31FV-D in Durango & Hermosa, Colorado
- K31FW-D in Lyman, Wyoming
- K31FZ-D in Haxtun, Colorado
- K31GH-D in Hayward, Wisconsin
- K31GJ-D in Alamogordo, New Mexico
- K31GN-D in La Grande, Oregon
- K31GP-D in Brookings, etc., Oregon
- K31GS-D in Roswell, New Mexico
- K31GZ-D in Lake Havasu City, Arizona
- K31HB-D in Gallina, New Mexico
- K31HC-D in Quanah, Texas
- K31HK-D in Rainier, Oregon
- K31HS-D in Malad, Idaho
- K31HY-D in Needles, etc., California
- K31HZ-D in The Dalles, etc., Oregon
- K31IE-D in Susanville, etc., California
- K31IF-D in Hagerman, Idaho
- K31IH-D in Wray, Colorado
- K31IQ-D in Sterling, Colorado
- K31IR-D in Grays River, Washington
- K31IS-D in Toquerville, Utah
- K31IU-D in Morgan, etc., Utah
- K31IV-D in Romeo, Colorado
- K31IW-D in Ridgway, Colorado
- K31IX-D in Salida, Colorado
- K31IZ-D in Naalehu, Hawaii
- K31JB-D in Hanna, etc., Utah
- K31JC-D in Duchesne, Utah
- K31JE-D in Escalante, Utah
- K31JF-D in Boulder, Utah
- K31JL-D in Vernal, etc., Utah
- K31JN-D in Scofield, Utah
- K31JO-D in Wood River, etc., Wyoming
- K31JP-D in Manila, etc., Utah
- K31JQ-D in Woodward, etc., Oklahoma
- K31JR-D in Thoreau, New Mexico
- K31JW-D in Elk City, Oklahoma
- K31JX-D in Rockville, Utah
- K31KB-D in Deming, New Mexico
- K31KC-D in Coalville & adjacent area, Utah
- K31KE-D in San Luis Obispo, etc., California
- K31KH-D in Stateline, Nevada
- K31KJ-D in Big Springs, Texas
- K31KK-D in Kingsville-Alice, Texas
- K31KL-D in Walla Walla, Washington
- K31KN-D in Caineville, Utah
- K31KP-D in Alton, Utah
- K31KQ-D in Plains, Montana
- K31KS-D in Lechee, etc., Arizona
- K31KT-D in Moses Lake, Washington
- K31KV-D in St. James, Minnesota
- K31KW-D in Richland, Washington
- K31KZ-D in Lakeview, Oregon
- K31LA-D in Fremont, Utah
- K31LC-D in Nephi, Utah
- K31LE-D in Bridger, etc., Montana
- K31LF-D in Clareton, Wyoming
- K31LG-D in Emery, Utah
- K31LH-D in Fishlake Resort, Utah
- K31LO-D in Eureka, Nevada
- K31MA-D in Big Falls, Minnesota
- K31MB-D in Ridgecrest, California
- K31MC-D in Spring Glen, etc., Utah
- K31MD-D in Kasilof, Alaska
- K31MJ-D in Four Buttes, etc., Montana
- K31MK-D in Lawton, Oklahoma
- K31MP-D in Grand Forks, North Dakota
- K31MU-D in Lingleville-Crowley, Texas, to move to channel 7
- K31NA-D in Altus, Oklahoma
- K31NB-D in Santa Fe, New Mexico
- K31ND-D in Oroville, California
- K31NE-D in Williams, Arizona
- K31NF-D in Verde Valley, etc., Arizona
- K31NH-D in Klamath Falls, Oregon
- K31NI-D in Lamar, Colorado
- K31NJ-D in Lansing, Iowa
- K31NK-D in Peoa, Oakley, Utah
- K31NL-D in Bonners Ferry, Idaho
- K31NO-D in Bend, Oregon
- K31NP-D in Rural Garfield County, Utah
- K31NR-D in Overton, Nevada
- K31NS-D in Fort Peck, Montana
- K31NT-D in Jackson, Minnesota
- K31NU-D in Hanksville, Utah
- K31NV-D in Globe-Miami, Arizona
- K31NW-D in Forsyth, Montana
- K31NX-D in Fountain Green, Utah
- K31NZ-D in Eagle Nest, New Mexico
- K31OA-D in Antimony, Utah
- K31OB-D in Randolph, Utah
- K31OC-D in Broken Bow, Nebraska
- K31OD-D in Henefer, etc., Utah
- K31OE-D in Dove Creek, etc., Colorado
- K31OF-D in Kanab, Utah
- K31OG-D in Parowan, Enoch, etc., Utah
- K31OH-D in Mesa, Colorado
- K31OI-D in Beryl, Modena etc., Utah
- K31OJ-D in Delta, etc., Utah
- K31OK-D in Beaver, etc., Utah
- K31OL-D in Salinas, California
- K31OM-D in Garrison, etc., Utah
- K31ON-D in Fillmore, etc., Utah
- K31OO-D in Green River, Utah
- K31OQ-D in Grants Pass, Oregon
- K31OR-D in Olivia, Minnesota
- K31OS-D in Ferron, Utah
- K31OT-D in Clear Creek, Utah
- K31OV-D in Clarendon, Texas
- K31OX-D in Ramah, New Mexico
- K31OY-D in Pahrump, Nevada
- K31PA-D in Dolan Springs, Arizona
- K31PC-D in Yuma, Colorado
- K31PD-D in Whitefish, etc., Montana
- K31PH-D in Crested Butte, Colorado
- K31PI-D in London Springs, Oregon
- K31PJ-D in Holbrook, Idaho
- K31PK-D in Birchdale, Minnesota
- K31PM-D in Farmington, New Mexico
- K31PO-D in Des Moines, Iowa
- K31PP-D in Sioux City, Iowa
- K31PR-D in Tyler, Texas
- K31PS-D in Lakeshore, California
- K31PT-D in Soda Springs, Idaho
- K31PY-D in Roundup, Montana
- K31PZ-D in Clarksville, Arkansas
- K31QA-D in Deadwood, South Dakota
- KAAS-LP in Garden City, Kansas
- KAGN-CD in Crowley, Louisiana
- KBAB-LD in Santa Barbara, California
- KBTF-CD in Bakersfield, California
- KBVO-CD in Austin, Texas, an ATSC 3.0 station
- KCSG-LD in Ogden, Utah
- KEOT-LD in Abilene, Texas
- KEUV-LD in Eureka, California
- KEVE-LD in Vancouver, Washington
- KFMS-LD in Sacramento, California
- KLDY-LD in Anchorage, Alaska
- KMNZ-LD in Coeur D'Alene, Idaho
- KNOV-CD in New Orleans, Louisiana
- KOHC-CD in Oklahoma City, Oklahoma
- KPJO-LD in Pittsburg, Kansas
- KPTP-LD in Norfolk, Nebraska
- KRET-CD in Palm Springs, California
- KSDY-LD in San Diego, California
- KTFF-LD in Fresno, California
- KVDF-CD in San Antonio, Texas
- KWNL-CD in Winslow, Arkansas
- KXOF-CD in Laredo, Texas
- KXOK-LD in Enid, Oklahoma
- W31AN-D in Murphy, North Carolina
- W31DC-D in Fort Pierce, Florida
- W31DH-D in Franklin, etc., North Carolina
- W31DI-D in Spruce Pine, North Carolina
- W31DV-D in Guayama, Puerto Rico
- W31EG-D in Tampa, Florida
- W31EH-D in Springfield, Illinois
- W31EJ-D in Tutu, St Thomas, U.S. Virgin Islands
- W31EL-D in Baton Rouge, Louisiana
- W31EP-D in Destin, Florida
- W31EU-D in Columbus, Georgia
- W31EV-D in Wausau, Wisconsin
- W31EZ-D in Chicago, Illinois, uses WESV-LD's spectrum
- W31FA-D in Elmhurst, Michigan
- W31FD-D in Bluffton-Hilton Head, South Carolina
- W31FE-D in Savannah, Georgia
- W31FF-D in Maple Valley, Michigan
- WAHU-LD in Crozet, Virginia
- WAXC-LD in Alexander City, Alabama
- WESV-LD in Chicago, Illinois
- WFDY-LD in Myrtle Beach, South Carolina
- WHTV-LD in New York, New York
- WIIC-LD in Pittsburgh, Pennsylvania, to move to channel 10
- WJNI-LD in North Charleston, South Carolina
- WLEK-LD in Concord, New Hampshire
- WLHY-LD in Lebanon-Harrisburg-York-Lancaster, Pennsylvania
- WMBP-LD in Mobile, Alabama
- WMKG-CD in Muskegon, Michigan
- WMUB-LD in Warner Robins, Georgia
- WNCE-CD in Glens Falls, New York
- WODH-LD in Jacksonville, Florida
- WQDE-LD in Indianapolis, Indiana
- WRDM-CD in Hartford, Connecticut, uses WVIT's full-power spectrum
- WSCF-LD in Melbourne, Florida
- WSFG-LD in Berry, Alabama
- WTBL-LD in Biloxi, Mississippi
- WTMO-CD in Orlando, Florida
- WTWL-LD in Wilmington, North Carolina
- WTZP-LD in Portsmouth, Ohio
- WWHL-LD in Nashville, Tennessee
- WZPK-LD in Highland, New York

The following low-power stations, which are no longer licensed, formerly broadcast on digital or analog channel 31:

- K31AG in English Bay, Alaska
- K31AK in Ellensburg, etc., Washington
- K31BW in Manhattan, Kansas
- K31BZ-D in Wellington, Texas
- K31CD-D in Canadian, Texas
- K31DB in Bluebell, etc., Utah
- K31FE in Blythe, California
- K31FG in Delta, etc., Utah
- K31FX in Pie Town & Quemado, New Mexico
- K31GC-D in Forrest, New Mexico
- K31GK-D in Ukiah, California
- K31HG in Wanship, Utah
- K31HH in Samak, Utah
- K31HO-D in Shreveport, Louisiana
- K31HQ in Lordsburg, New Mexico
- K31HT in Casper, Wyoming
- K31IA in Great Falls, Montana
- K31JA-D in Fruitland, Utah
- K31KI-D in Round Mountain, Nevada
- K31KR-D in Three Forks, Montana
- K31KU-D in Rapid City, South Dakota
- K31LB in Elko, Nevada
- K31LL-D in Midland/Odessa, Texas
- K31LZ in Camp Verde, Arizona
- K31MX-D in Plainview, Texas
- K31PF-D in Weed, California
- K31PG-D in Granite Falls, Minnesota
- KBLI-LD in Lincoln, Nebraska
- KGFZ-LD in Yakima, etc., Washington
- KVHM-LP in Victoria, Texas
- KWEM-LP in Stillwater, Oklahoma
- W31BP in Burlington, etc., New York
- W31CQ in Elkins, West Virginia
- W31CX in Bangor, Maine
- W31CZ-D in Tampa, Florida
- W31DL-D in Ponce, Puerto Rico
- W31DZ-D in Clarksdale, Mississippi
- W31EX-D in Bangor, Maine
- WDDM-LD in Tallahassee, Florida
- WKOG-LP in Indianapolis, Indiana
- WNAL-LD in Scottsboro, Alabama
- WTVK-LP in Key West, Florida
- WUDJ-LD in Crozet, Virginia
- WUDP-LD in Lafayette, Indiana
- WWBP-LP in Freedom, Pennsylvania
