= Bill C-31 =

Bill C-31 may refer to the following bills:

- "An Act to Amend the Indian Act", a 1985 act amending the Canadian Indian Act, see Indian Act#Loss of status prior to 1985 amendments
- An Act to Amend the Canada Elections Act and the Public Service Employment Act, a 2007 act
- "Protecting Canada's Immigration System Act", a 2012 act
- An Act to Implement Certain Provisions of the Budget Tabled in Parliament on February 11, 2014 and Other Measures, a 2014 act including provisions on bitcoin
