= Channel 31 TV stations in Mexico =

The following television stations broadcast on digital or analog channel 31 in Mexico:

- XET-TDT in Monterrey, Nuevo León
- XHCCT-TDT in Ciudad del Carmen, Campeche
- XHCTCJ-TDT in Ciudad Juárez, Chihuahua
- XHDH-TDT in Mérida, Yucatán
- XHDL-TDT in Mazatlán, Sinaloa
- XHGC-TDT in Mexico City
- XHGJE-TDT in Jerécuaro, Guanajuato
- XHGSA-TDT in Salvatierra, Guanajuato
- XHHLO-TDT in Huajuapan de León, Oaxaca
- XHHMA-TDT in Hermosillo, Sonora
- XHIC-TDT in Perote, Veracruz de Ignacio de la Llave
- XHIGN-TDT in Iguala, Guerrero
- XHLBN-TDT in Tepic, Nayarit
- XHLGG-TDT in León, Guanajuato
- XHLRM-TDT in Los Reyes Salgado, Michoacán de Ocampo
- XHLVZ-TDT in Zacatecas, Zacatecas
- XHMIS-TDT in Los Mochis, Sinaloa
- XHMOS-TDT in Moctezuma, Sonora
- XHNCI-TDT in Manzanillo, Colima
- XHNSS-TDT in Nogales, Sonora
- XHPET-TDT in Puerto Escondido, Oaxaca
- XHPNH-TDT in Piedras Negras, Coahuila
- XHSCE-TDT in Saltillo, Coahuila
- XHSFJ-TDT in Guadalajara, Jalisco
- XHSLA-TDT in San Luis Potosí, San Luis Potosí
- XHSPB-TDT in La Paz, Baja California Sur
- XHSPROS-TDT in Ciudad Obregón, Sonora
- XHSPRTC-TDT in Tuxtla Gutierrez, Chiapas
- XHTCL-TDT in Calpulalpan, Tlaxcala
- XHTK-TDT in Ciudad Victoria, Tamaulipas
- XHUBT-TDT in La Venta, Tabasco
- XHVPA-TDT in Villa Pesqueira, Sonora
