= F31 (classification) =

Disability sport classification

F31 is a disability sport classification for seated throwing events (the "F" stands for field events, excluding jump events) in disability athletics. The only event this class competes in at the Paralympic Games is the club throw.

== Definition ==
This classification is for disability athletics. The Australian Paralympic Committee defines this classification as being for "Severe quadriplegia "

== History ==
The classification was created by the International Paralympic Committee and has roots in a 2003 attempt to address "the overall objective to support and co-ordinate the ongoing development of accurate, reliable, consistent and credible sport focused classification systems and their implementation."

== Performance and rules ==
Athletes in this class used secure frames for throwing events. The frame can be only one of two shapes: A rectangle or square. The sides must be at least 30 centimetres (12 in) long. The seat needs to be lower at the back or level, and it cannot be taller than 75 centimetres (30 in). This height includes any cushioning or padding. Throwers can have footplates on their frames, but the footplate can only be used for stability. It cannot be used to push off from. Rests can be used on the frame but they need to be present only for safety reasons and to aide in athlete stability. They need to be manufactured from rigid materials that do not move. These materials may include steel or aluminum. The backrest can have cushioning but it cannot be thicker than 5 centimetres (2.0 in). It cannot have any movable parts. The frame can also have a holding bar. The holding bar needs to be round or square, and needs to be a single straight piece. Athletes are not required to use a holding bar during their throw, and they can hold on to any part of the frame during their throw. Throwing frames should be inspected prior to the event. This should be done either in the call room or in the competition area. In general, people in this class should be allocated around 3 minutes to set up their chair.

Athletes need to throw from a seated position. They cannot throw from an inclined or other position. Doing so could increase the contribution of their legs and benefit their performance. Their legs must be in contact with the seat during the throw. If an athlete throws from a non-seated position, this is counted as a foul. People in this class cannot put tape on their hands. All straps used to hold the athlete to the frame must be non-elastic. While in the process of throwing, an athlete cannot touch a tie-down for the frame. Because of visibility issues for officials, athletes cannot wear lose clothing and they can ask athletes to tuck in clothing if they feel there is any issue with visibility. In throwing events at the World Championships, athletes get three initial throws. After that, the top 8 throwers get an additional three throws. For other events, organizers generally have the option to use that formula or to give all throwers six consecutive throws.

== Becoming classified ==
Athletes with cerebral palsy or similar impairments who wish to compete in para-athletics competition must first undergo a classification assessment. During this, they both undergo a bench test of muscle coordination and demonstrate their skills in athletics, such as pushing a racing wheelchair and throwing. A determination is then made as to what classification an athlete should compete in. Classifications may be Confirmed or Review status. For athletes who do not have access to a full classification panel, Provisional classification is available; this is a temporary Review classification, considered an indication of class only, and generally used only in lower levels of competition.

== Competitions ==
gender	EVENT	Class	AQS/MQS	BQS	Event
men's	club throw	F31/32	32.57	29.75	2016 Summer Paralympics
women's	club throw	F31/32	20.85	17.5	2016 Summer Paralympics

== See also ==
- Para-athletics classification
- Athletics at the Summer Paralympics
