= 2015 CPISRA World Games =

Cerebral palsy sports event

- Host city: Nottingham, England
- Opening: 6 August
- Closing: 16 August

The 2015 CPISRA World Games were held in Nottingham, England from 6 to 16 August 2015.

== Sports ==
- Athletics including Racerunning
- Bowls
- CP Football
- Para Taekwondo
- Swimming
- Table cricket

== Venues ==
The venues to be used for the World Championships were located in Nottingham.

| Nottingham | | | 2015 CPISRA World Games is located in England |
| Harvey Hadden Stadium | Highfields Playing Fields | Nottingham Indoor Bowls Club | 2015 CPISRA World Games is located in England |
| Capacity: 1,600 (740 seated capacity) | Capacity: unknown | Capacity: unknown | 2015 CPISRA World Games is located in England |

== Participating delegations ==
- Australia
- Austria
- Brazil
- Denmark
- England
- Hungary
- (Republic of Ireland) Ireland
- Japan
- Netherlands
- Portugal
- Russia
- Sweden
- Scotland

== Competition ==
=== Bowls ===
Competition Format

- Singles: World Bowls Tour qualification format. E.g. best of 2 sets (each set consisting of 7 ends) with a 3 end tie breaker if needed. 90 mins per match.
- Doubles: Pairs will be drawn at random to play against each other in a basic round robin format.

Results

Bowls Pairs

| Rank | |
|---|---|
| Gold medal | (Australia) Josh Barry & Lucas Protopapas |
| Silver medal | (England) Les Smith & Steve Angus |
| Bronze medal | (England) George Pierrepoint & Laurie Turner |

Bowls Singles

| Rank | |
|---|---|
| Gold medal | (Australia) Josh Barry |
| Silver medal | (England) Laurie Turner |
| Bronze medal | (England) Steve Angus |

Spirit of the Games Award

(Scotland) John Wardrope

=== Football ===
| Rank | Team |
|---|---|
| Gold medal | Russia |
| Silver medal | Brazil |
| Bronze medal | England |

=== Para Taekwondo ===
- no information about the competition

=== Table cricket ===
- test match (no other information)

== Medal table ==
* Host nation (England)

| Rank | Nation | Gold | Silver | Bronze | Total |
|---|---|---|---|---|---|
| 1 | England (ENG)* | 85 | 52 | 19 | 156 |
| 2 | Scotland (SCO) | 29 | 13 | 11 | 53 |
| 3 | Australia (AUS) | 22 | 7 | 3 | 32 |
| 4 | Ireland (IRE) | 18 | 3 | 4 | 25 |
| 5 | Austria (AUT) | 11 | 17 | 6 | 34 |
| 6 | Denmark (DEN) | 10 | 2 | 0 | 12 |
| 7 | Sweden (SWE) | 6 | 7 | 4 | 17 |
| 8 | Portugal (POR) | 3 | 6 | 3 | 12 |
| 9 | Hungary (HUN) | 3 | 1 | 0 | 4 |
| 10 | Russia (RUS) | 1 | 0 | 0 | 1 |
| 11 | Brazil (BRA) | 0 | 2 | 1 | 3 |
| 12 | Japan (JPN) | 0 | 0 | 0 | 0 |
| 12 | Netherlands (NED) | 0 | 0 | 0 | 0 |
| Totals (13 entries) | | 188 | 110 | 51 | 349 |

== See also ==
- CP football
